= Counter-Composition of Dissonances XVI =

Painting by Theo van Doesburg

- Contra-compositie van dissonanten XVI
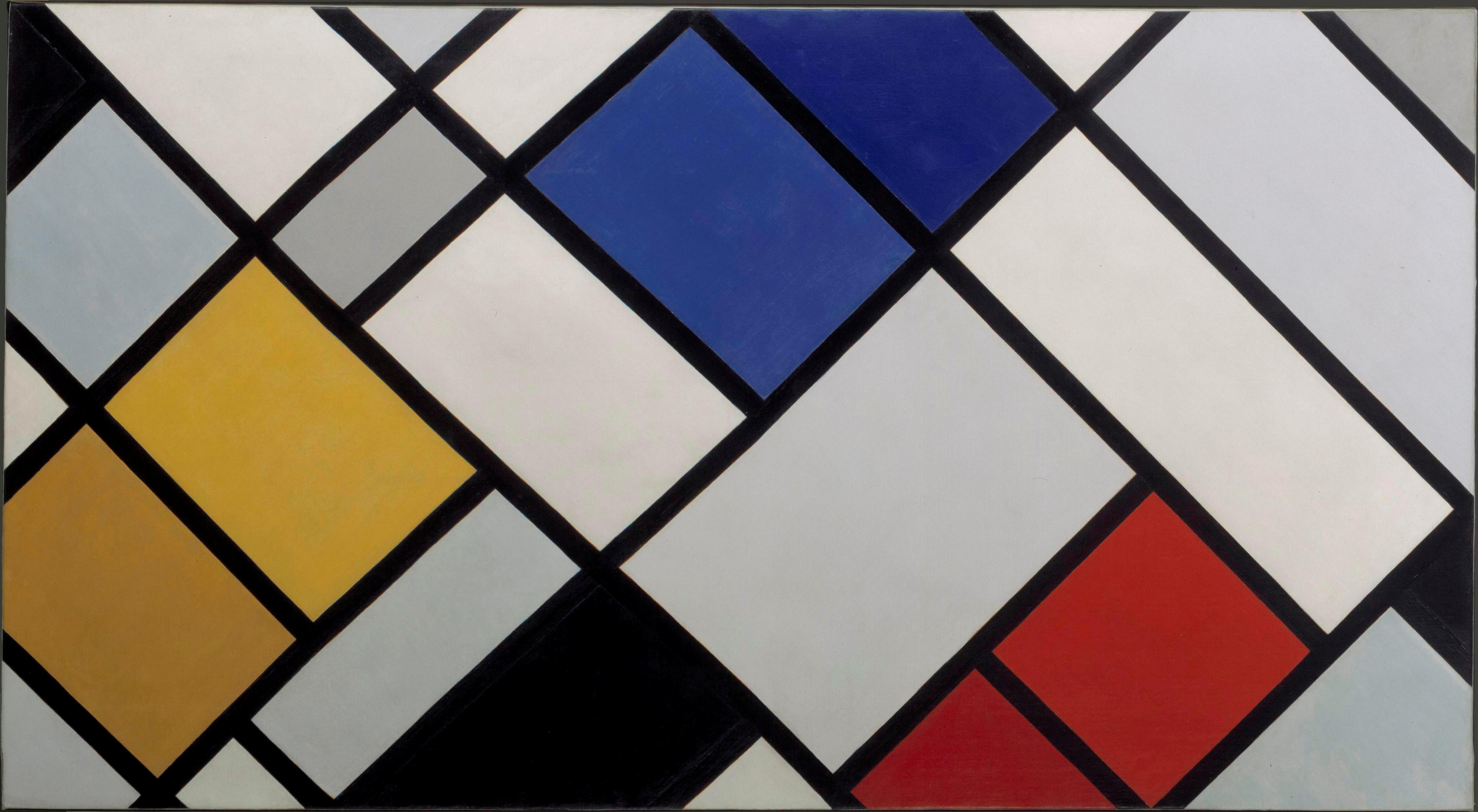
- Artist: Theo van Doesburg
- Year: 1925
- Medium: oil paint, canvas
- Dimensions: 100 cm (39 in) × 180 cm (71 in)
- Location: Kunstmuseum Den Haag
- Accession: 0332094

Counter-Composition of Dissonances XVI (in Dutch: Contra-compositie XVI) is a painting by the Dutch artist Theo van Doesburg, from 1925. It hangs in the Kunstmuseum Den Haag, in The Hague.

== Title ==
Counter-Composition of Dissonances XVI is the eleventh in a series of counter-compositions, which Van Doesburg started in 1924. It was originally called Counter-Composition of Dissonances XI. The current title derives from Van Doesburg's book Unique studies for Compositions, where all the preparatory studies of his counter compositions were listed, and this appeared as the sixteenth.

== Date ==
Counter-Composition of Dissonances XVI was painted sometime between 27 August and 30 November 1925. On 27 August Van Doesburg wrote to his friend César Domela Nieuwenhuis that he had just completed two paintings with diagonal lines (Counter-Composition of Dissonances VI and Counter-Composition of Dissonances XIII). On 30 November Counter-Composition of Dissonances XVI formed part of the exhibition L'Art d'Aujourd'hui in Paris.

== Provenance ==
In 1934, Counter-Composition of Dissonances XVI was gifted to the Kunstmuseum (then called the Gemeentemuseum) by Van Doesburg's widow, Nelly van Doesburg.
