= Composition with Large Red Plane, Yellow, Black, Grey and Blue =

Painting by Piet Mondrian

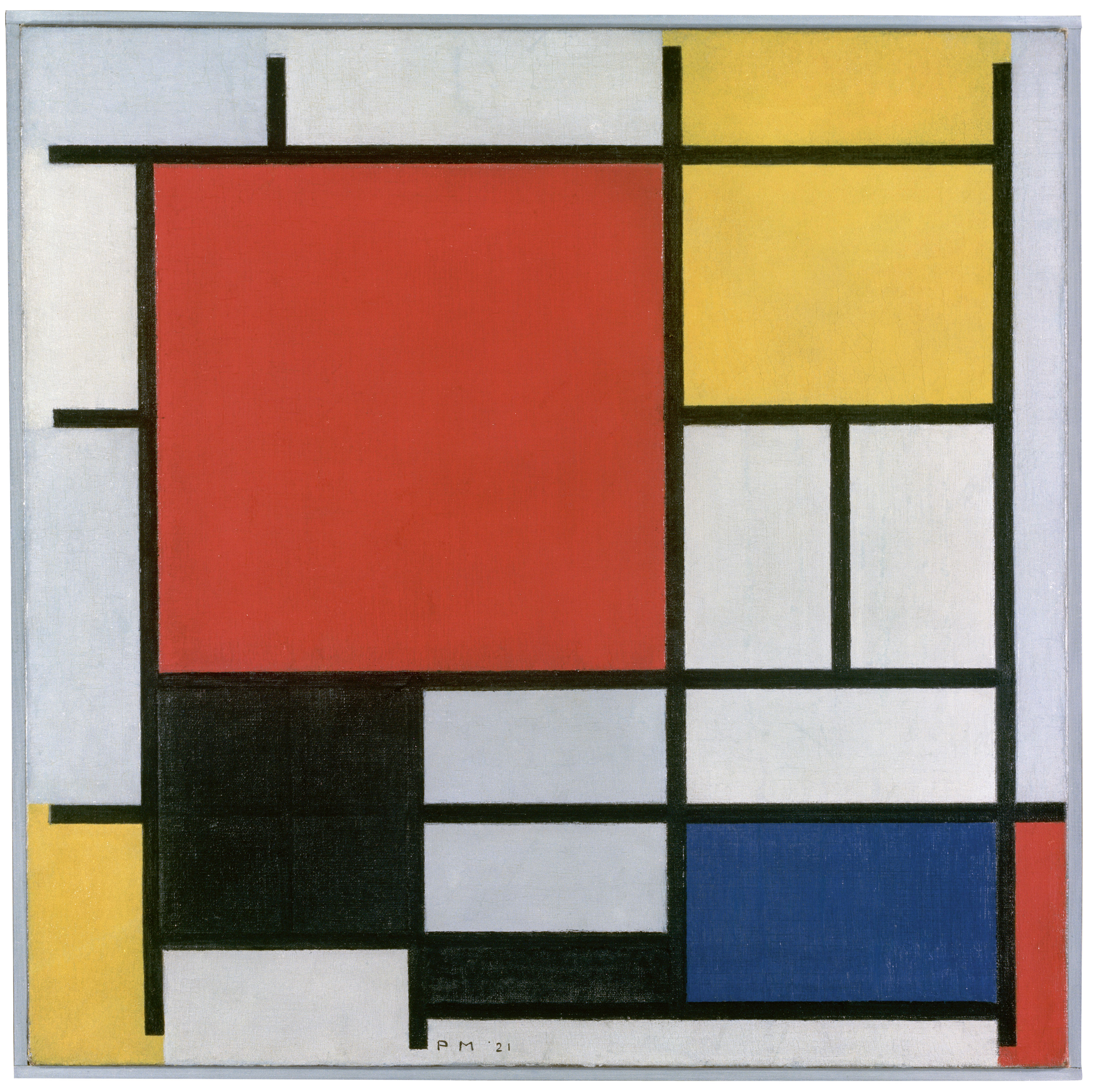
- Artist: Piet Mondrian
- Year: 1921
- Medium: oil paint, canvas
- Dimensions: 59.5 cm (23.4 in) × 59.5 cm (23.4 in)
- Location: Kunstmuseum Den Haag
- Accession: 0333329

Composition with Large Red Plane, Yellow, Black, Grey and Blue is an abstract painting from 1921 by the Dutch artist Piet Mondrian. The painting is part of the Kunstmuseum collection in The Hague.

In 1920, Mondrian expressed his belief that art should strive to express deeper truths about the world, rather than imitate life on its surface alone, and endeavor towards artistic freedom, publishing an essay entitled "Neo-Plasticism." Composition with Large Red Plane, Yellow, Black, Grey and Blue is Mondrian's first painting after the publication of this essay, visually representing these ideals by stripping away all recognizable forms of physical objects and even the outlines of individual brushstrokes.

The oil on canvas painting is square in form, measuring 59.5 by 59.5 cm. It was bought in 1921 by Jo Steijling, a Dutch acquaintance that came to visit the painter in Paris. The purchase enabled Mondrian to hire a more expensive studio in Paris, on the rue du Départ.
