= Theo van Doesburg =

Dutch artist (1883–1931)

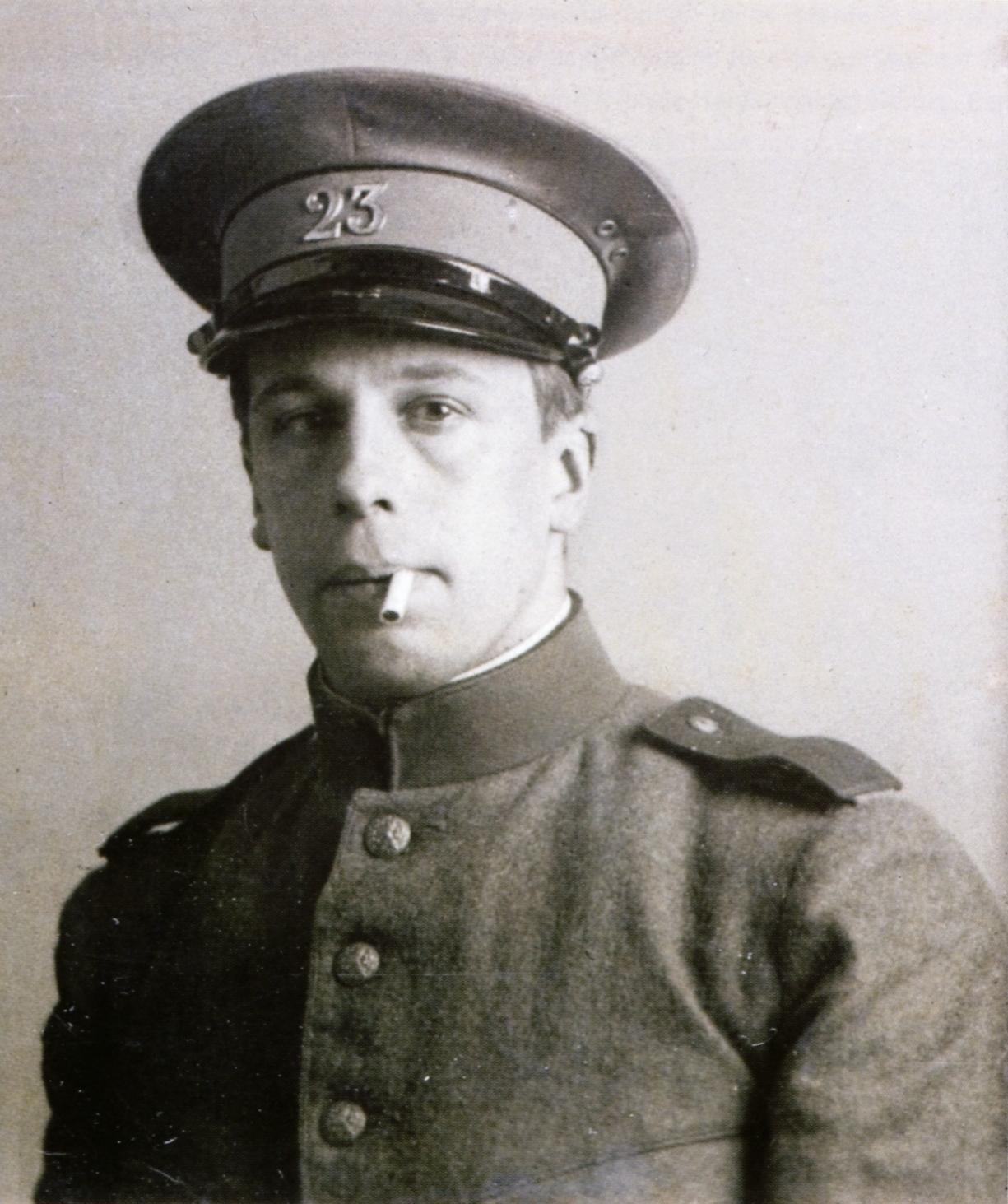
- Van Doesburg as Sergeant Küpper, c. 1915
- Born: Christian Emil Marie Küpper; 30 August 1883; Utrecht, Netherlands
- Died: 7 March 1931 (aged 47); Davos, Switzerland
- Other names: I.K. Bonset, Aldo Camini, "Does"
- Known for: Painting, architecture, poetry
- Movement: De Stijl, Elementarism, Concrete art, Dadaism

Theo van Doesburg (Dutch: [ˈteːjoː vɑn ˈduzbʏr(ə)x]; born Christian Emil Marie Küpper; 30 August 1883 – 7 March 1931) was a Dutch painter, writer, poet, and architect. He is best known as the founder and leader of De Stijl.

== Personal life ==
Theo van Doesburg was born Christian Emil Marie Küpper on 30 August 1883, in Utrecht, Netherlands, as the son of the photographer Wilhelm Küpper and Henrietta Catherina Margadant. After a short period of training in acting and singing, he decided to become a storekeeper. He always regarded his stepfather, Theodorus Doesburg, to be his natural father, so that his first works are signed with Theo Doesburg, to which he later added "van".

Van Doesburg married three times: on 4 May 1910 to theosophist, poet and writer Agnita Henrica Feis; on 30 May 1917 to accountant Helena 'Lena' Milius; and on 24 November 1928 to artist, pianist and choreographer Petronella 'Nelly' Johanna van Moorsel.

== Career ==
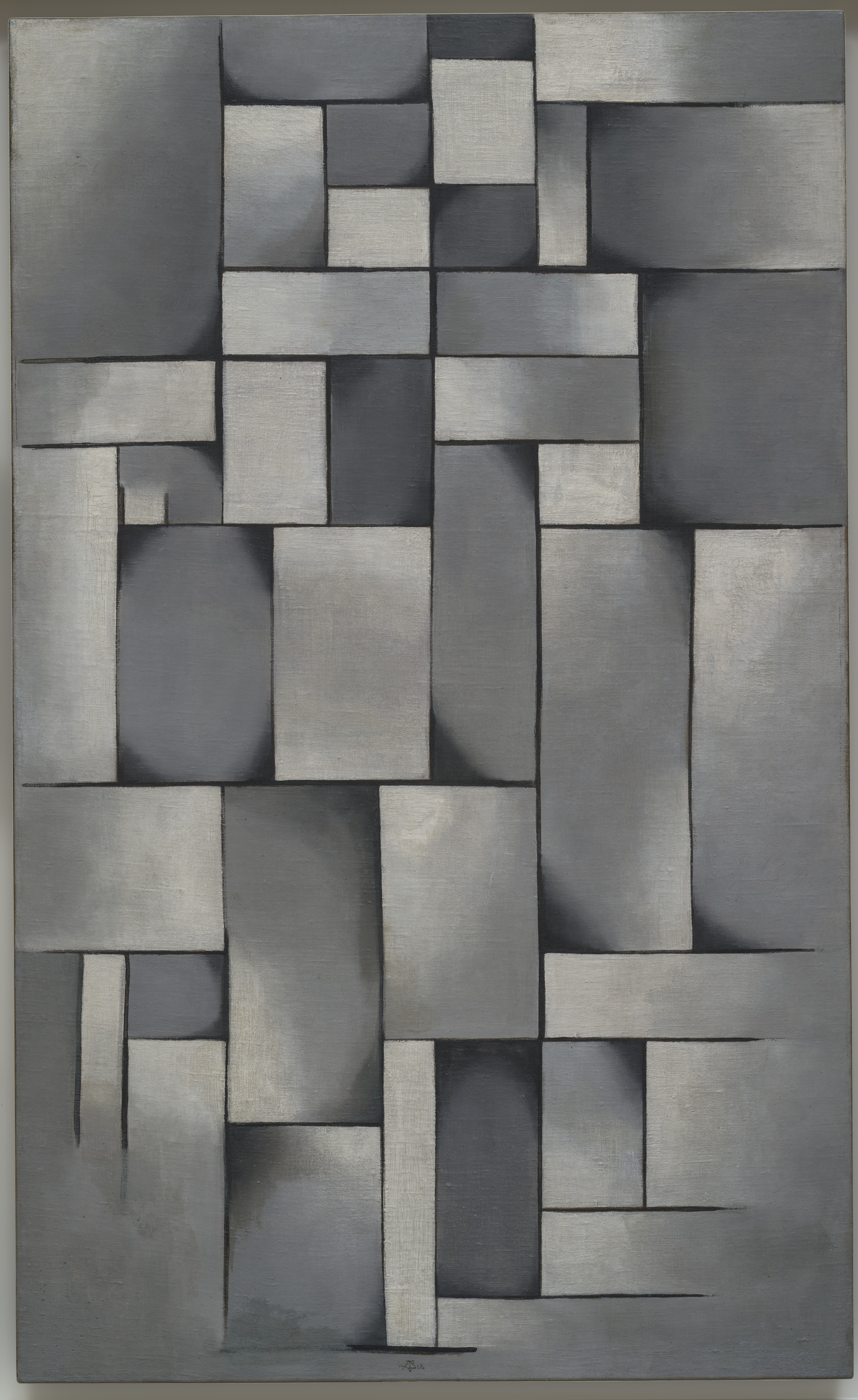
Theo van Doesburg, Composition in Gray (Rag-time), 1919, Oil on canvas, 196.5 cm × 59.1 cm (77.4 in × 23.3 in), The Solomon R. Guggenheim Foundation Peggy Guggenheim Collection, Venice, 1976

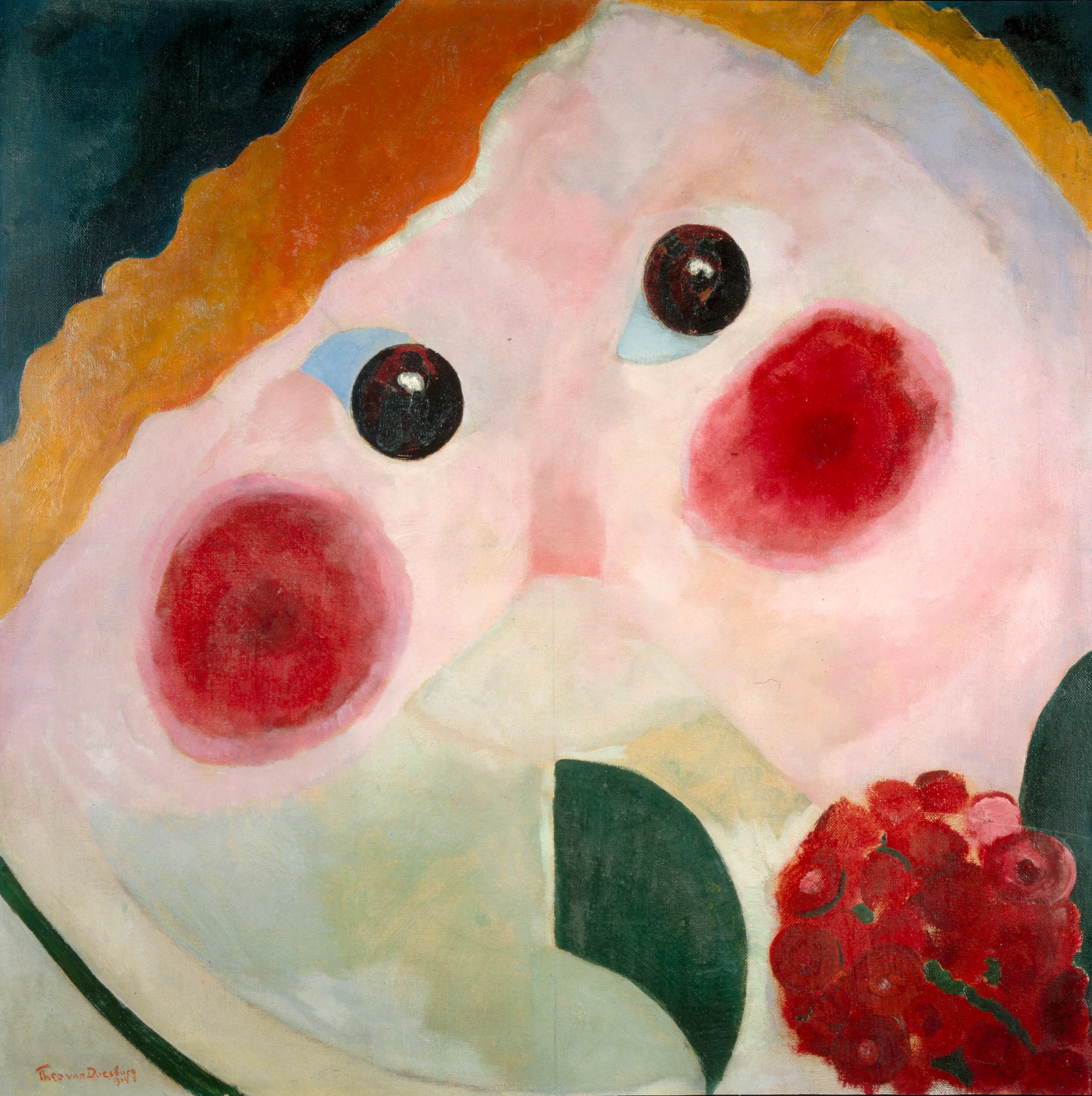
Girl with Ranunculus, Oil on canvas, 1914, Centraal Museum, Utrecht

His first exhibition was in 1908. From 1912 onwards, he supported his works by writing for magazines. At the time, he considered himself to be a modern painter, although his early work is more in line with the Amsterdam Impressionists and Vincent van Gogh. This changed in 1913 after reading Wassily Kandinsky's Rückblicke, an autobiographical retrospective on Kandinsky's life and artwork. Van Doesburg realized there was a higher, more spiritual level in painting that originates from the mind rather than from everyday life, and that abstraction is the only logical outcome of this. In 1912, Van Doesburg began criticizing Futurism in his articles: "The mimetic expression of velocity (whatever its form may be: the aeroplane, the automobile, and so on) is diametrically opposed to the character of painting, the supreme origin of which is to be found in inner life". On 6 November 1915, he wrote in the same journal: "Mondrian realizes the importance of line. The line has almost become a work of art in itself; one can not play with it when the representation of objects perceived was all-important. The white canvas is almost solemn. Each superfluous line, each wrongly placed line, any color placed without veneration or care, can spoil everything—that is, the spiritual".

== The De Stijl movement ==
In 1915 (halfway through his two-year service in the army), Van Doesburg reviewed an exhibition by Piet Mondrian for a magazine article. Inspired by Mondrian's depictions of abstraction, Van Doesburg got in contact with Mondrian, and together with related artists Bart van der Leck, Antony Kok, Vilmos Huszár, and Jacobus Oud, they founded the magazine De Stijl in 1917.

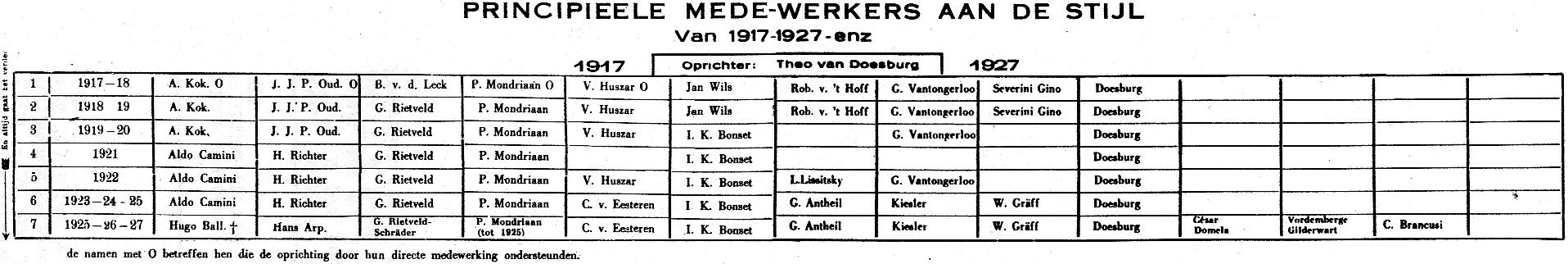
Principal contributors to De Stijl 1917–1927

=== Promoting De Stijl ===
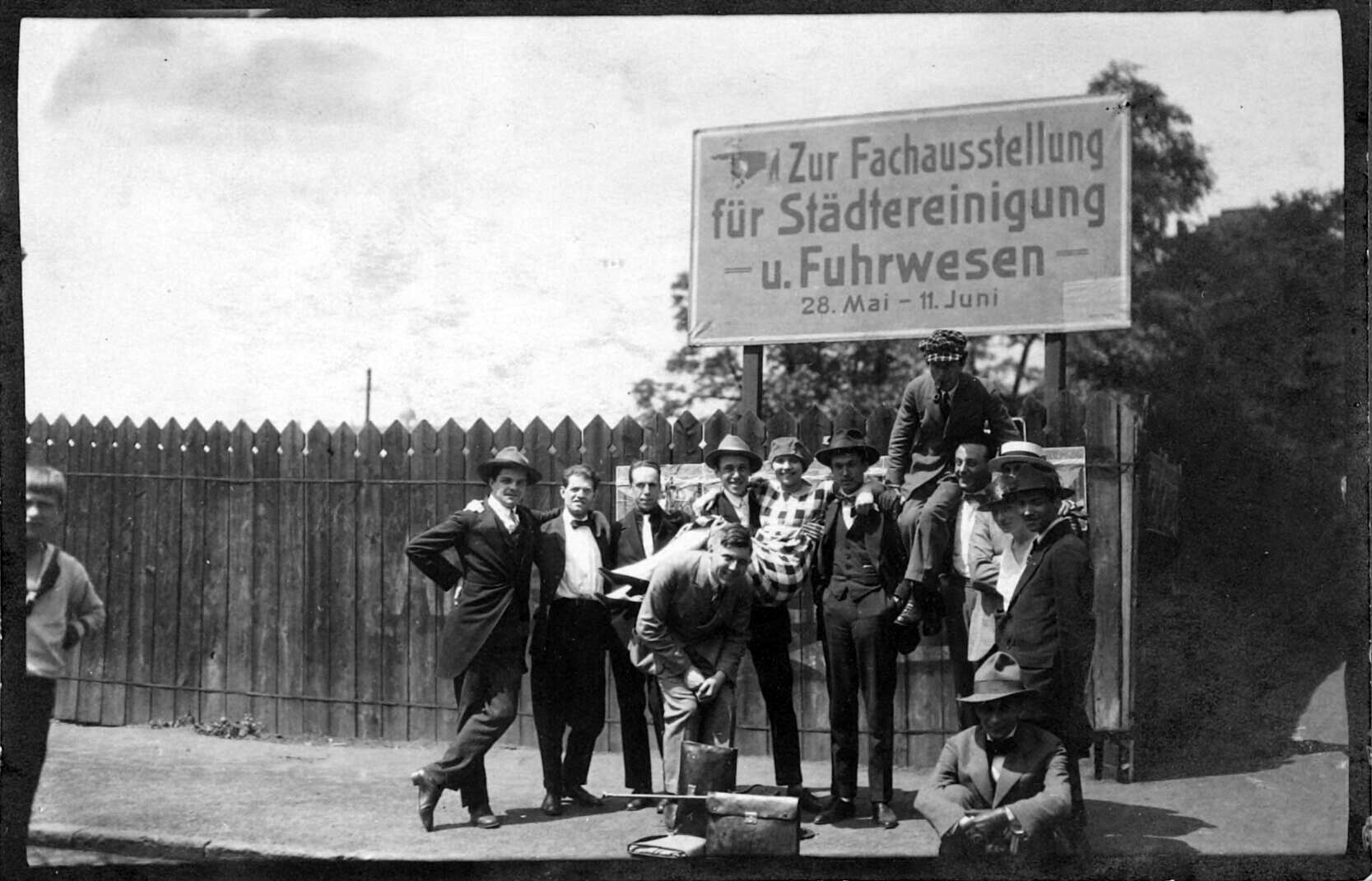
Congress of the Union of International Progressive Artists held at Düsseldorf, May 1922

Although De Stijl was made up of many members, Van Doesburg was the "ambassador" of the movement, promoting the ideas of Neoplasticism across Europe. He moved to Weimar in 1922, deciding to make an impression on the Bauhaus principal, Walter Gropius, to spread the influence of the movement.

While Gropius accepted many of the precepts of contemporary art movements, he did not feel that Doesburg should become a Bauhaus master. As a response, Doesburg installed himself near the Bauhaus buildings and started to attract school students interested in the new ideas of Constructivism, Dadaism, and De Stijl.

Van Doesburg maintained direct contact with representatives of European avant-garde movements, including Polish artists. His writings were reprinted among others in Blok and Praesens, he also published two articles on Polish art and architecture in the Dutch journal Het Bouwbedrijf.

== The split with Mondrian ==
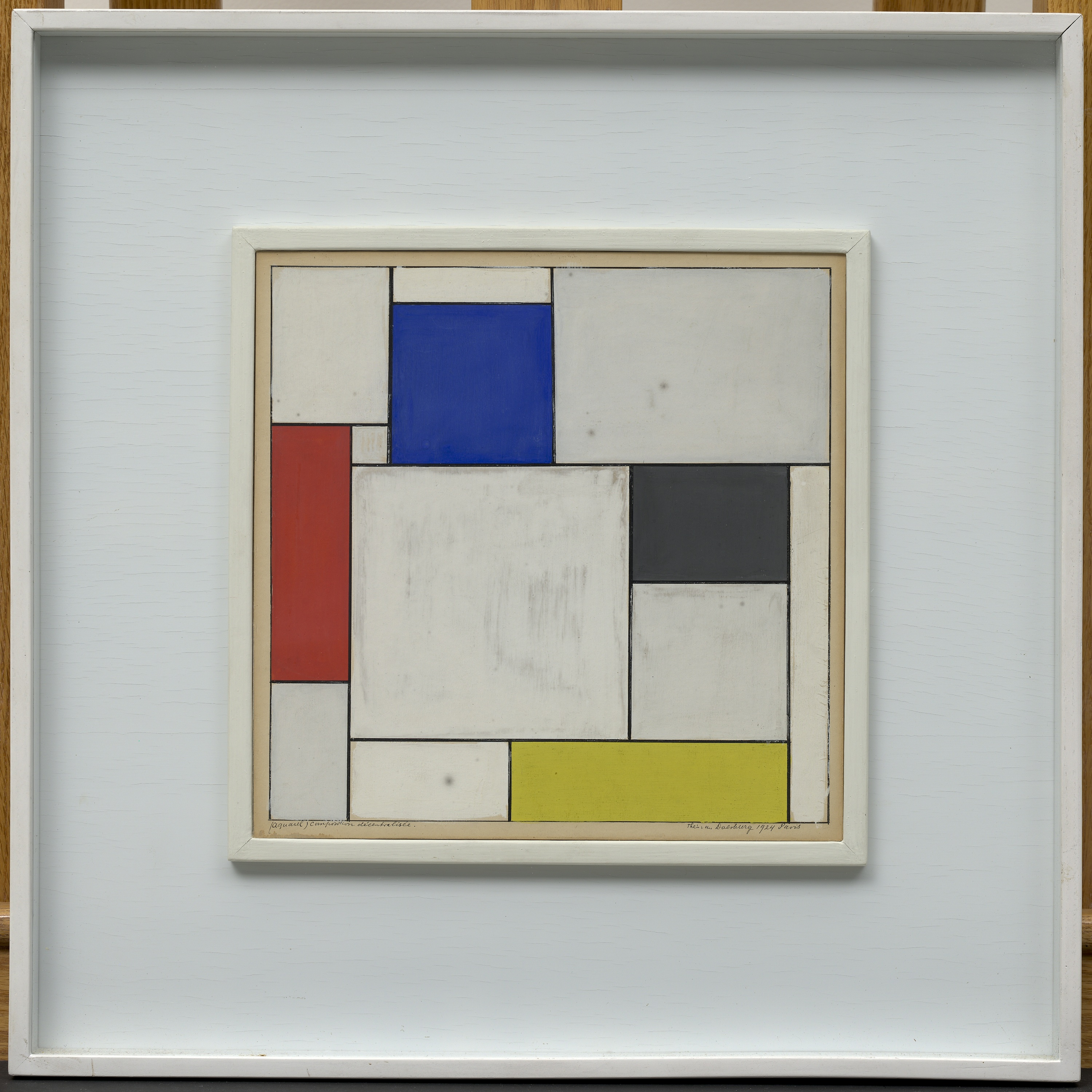
Composition décentralisée, 1924, Gouache on board, 11 3/8 x 11 1/2 inches (28.9 x 29.2 cm), Solomon R. Guggenheim Museum, New York Bequest, Richard S. Zeisler, 2007

The friendship between Van Doesburg and Mondrian remained strong in these years, although their primary means of communication was by letter. In 1923 Van Doesburg moved to Paris, together with his later wife Nelly van Moorsel. As the two men interacted more, the differences in character became apparent: Mondrian was an introvert, while van Doesburg was more flamboyant and extravagant. During 1924, they disagreed extensively, which eventually led to a temporary split that year. The exact reason for the split has been a point of contention among art historians; usually the divergent ideas about the directions of the lines in the paintings have been named as the primary reason: Mondrian never accepted diagonals, whereas Doesburg insisted on the dynamic aspects of the diagonal and featured it in his art. Mondrian accepted some concepts of diagonals, such as in his "Lozenge" paintings, where the canvas was rotated 45 degrees, while still maintaining horizontal lines. In recent years, however, this theory has been challenged by art historians such as Carel Blotkamp, who cites the artist's different concepts about space and time. After the split, Van Doesburg launched a new concept for his art, Elementarism, which was characterized by the diagonal lines and which rivaled Mondrian's Neo-Plasticism.

In 1929 the two men reconciled when they accidentally met in a café in Paris.

== Architecture, design, and typography ==
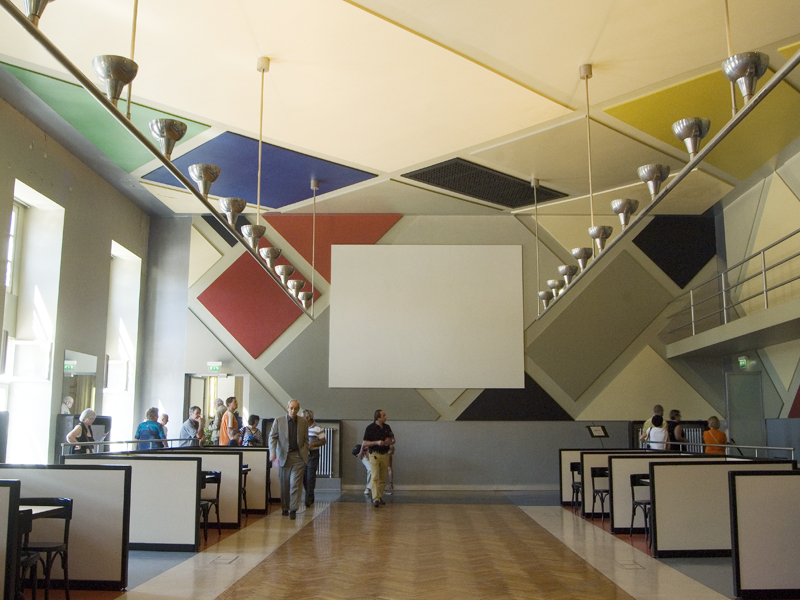
A reconstruction of the dance hall/cinema designed by Theo van Doesburg: “Cinébal” at the Aubette in Strasbourg.

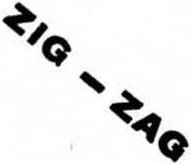
Bonset zig-zag

Outside of painting and promoting De Stijl, Van Doesburg frequently made efforts in architecture. He designed houses for artists, and together with Sophie Taeuber-Arp and Hans Arp, he designed the decoration for the Aubette entertainment complex in Strasbourg. Together with El Lissitzky and Kurt Schwitters, Van Doesburg pioneered the efforts to an International of Arts in two congresses held in Düsseldorf and Weimar, in 1922. A geometrically constructed alphabet Van Doesburg designed in 1919 has been revived in digital form as Architype Van Doesburg. This typeface anticipates similar later experimentation by Kurt Schwitters in his typeface Architype Schwitters. In the mid-1920s, Van Doesburg worked together with Schwitters and the artist Kate Steinitz to produce a series of children's fairy-tale books that featured unusual typography, including Hahnepeter (Peter the Rooster, 1924), Die Märchen vom Paradies (The Fairy Tales of Paradise, 1924–25), and Die Scheuche (The Scarecrow, 1925).

Van Doesburg also kept a link with Dada, publishing the magazine Mécano under the heteronym of I. K. Bonset (possibly derived from "Ik ben zot", Dutch for "I am foolish"). He also published Dada poetry under the same name in De Stijl. Under a second pseudonym, Aldo Camini, he published anti-philosophical prose, inspired by the Italian representative of Metaphysical art, Carlo Carrà. In these works of literature, he heavily opposed individualism (and thus against the movement of the Tachtigers, realism, and psychological thinking). He sought for a collective experience of reality. His conception of intensity had much in common with Paul van Ostaijen's conception of dynamiek. He wanted to strip words of their former meaning, and give them a new meaning and power of expression. By doing this, he tried to evoke a new reality, instead of describing it.

== Last years ==
Van Doesburg stayed active in art groups and the magazine Cercle et Carré, which he left in 1929. "The plan to produce a magazine had been broached some time before. It is clear from the correspondence that in the spring of 1928 Van Doesburg made the first designs for the layout of the periodical. He wrote to Joaquín Torres-García on 28 May 1929: I will prepare the blueprint fo nouveau plan." Art Concret, which he co-founded in 1929, and Abstraction-Création, which he co-founded in 1931. At the end of February 1931 he was forced to move to Davos in Switzerland because of his declining health. Van Doesburg did not recuperate: on 7 March 1931, he died of a heart attack. After his death Nelly van Doesburg released the last issue of De Stijl in January 1932, as a memorial issue, with contributions by old and new members from De Stijl.

== Influence ==
Van Doesburg's work has had significant influence, including that dealing with issues of crossover art, design and architecture. For example, his Space-time construction #3 (1923) was a key work in the Miller Company Collection of Abstract Art's Painting toward architecture exhibition (1947–52, 28 venues). From that time, the work was influential to the practice of noted architect Harry Seidler. In 1992, he acquired the artwork, which was donated to the National Gallery of Australia in Canberra in 2010. In a travelling, international exhibition on Seidler's work, Van Doesburg's Space time-construction #3 was shown as a key influence.

== Works and publications ==
=== Publications ===
- van Doesburg, Theo (9 November 1912). "Futurisme" [Futurism]. Eenheid. 3 (127): 1–6.
- van Doesburg, Theo (1916). The New Movement in Painting [De nieuwe beweging in de schilderkunst] (in English and Dutch). Vol. 12. De Beweging.
- van Doesburg, Theo (1917). "De Stijl". De Stijl. 1-8 (1917-1932).
- van Doesburg, Theo (1919). Three Presentations On The New Visual Arts [Drie voordrachten over de nieuwe beeldende kunst verscheen]. Amsterdam.
- van Doesburg, Theo (1919). "Fundamental Concepts of the New Visual Art" [Grondbegrippen Der Nieuwe Beeldende Kunst]. Tijdschrift voor Wijsbegeerte. 13: 30–49, 169–188.
- van Doesburg, Theo (April 1923). "Anti-Tendenkunst" [Anti-Tendencious Art]. De Stijl. 6 (2): 17–19.
- van Doesburg, Theo (1925). Principles Of Neo-plastic Art [Grundbefriffe der neuen gestaltenden Kunst]. Lars Müller.
- van Doesburg, Theo (1929). "Der Kampf um den Neuen Stil" [The Struggle for the New Style]. Neue Schweizer Rundschau. 1929 (1, 3, 5, 7, 8).

=== Works ===
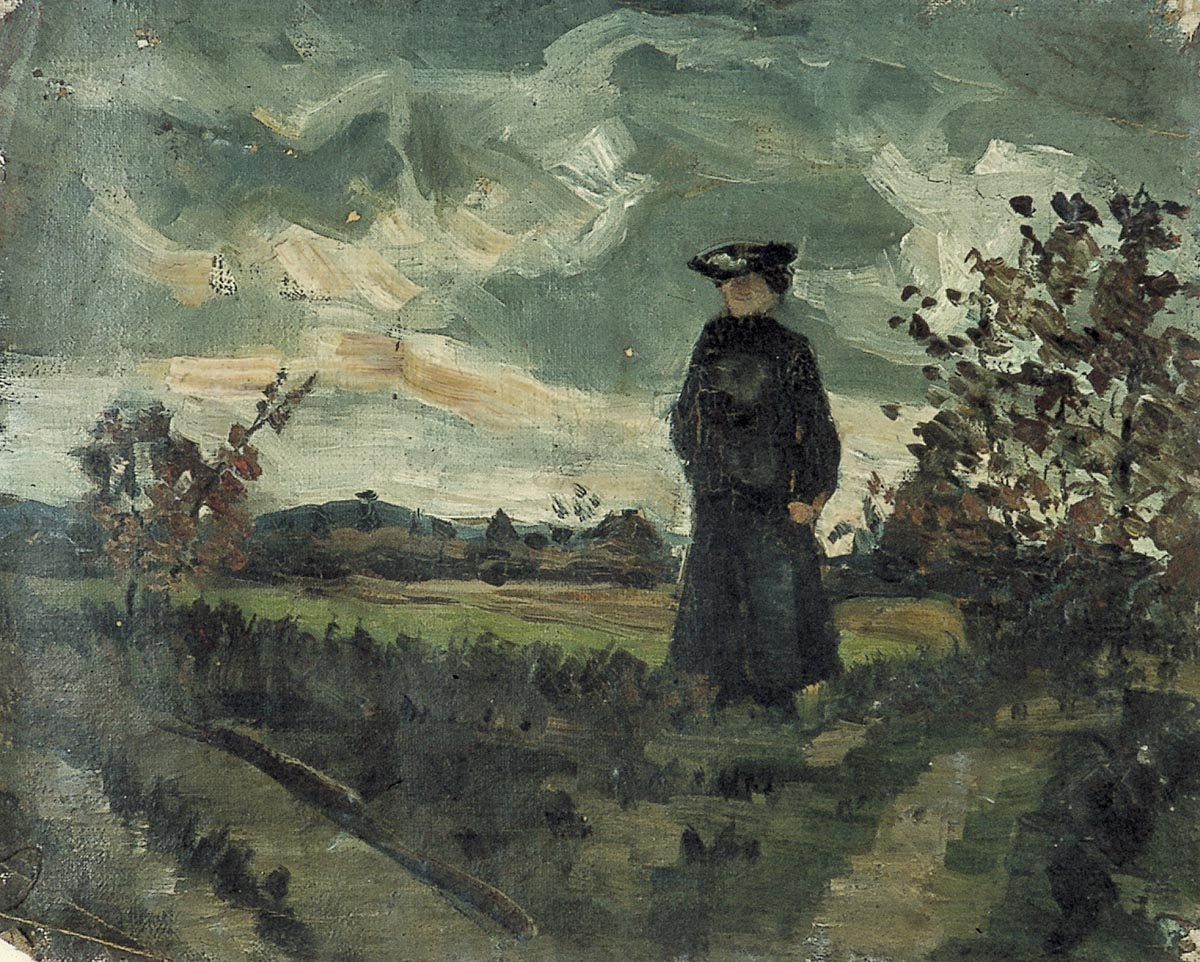
Woman in Landscape

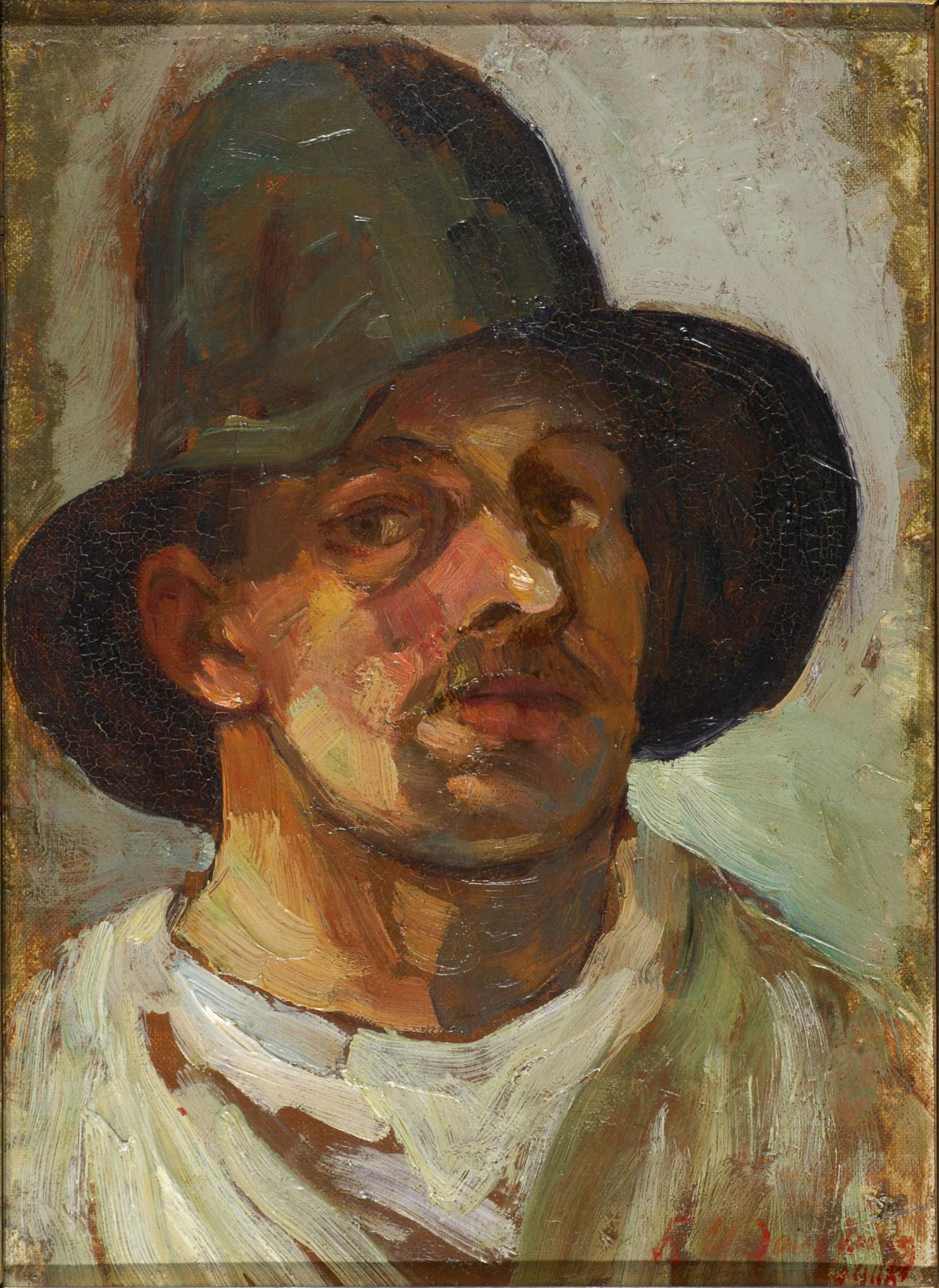
Self-portrait with hat, 1906

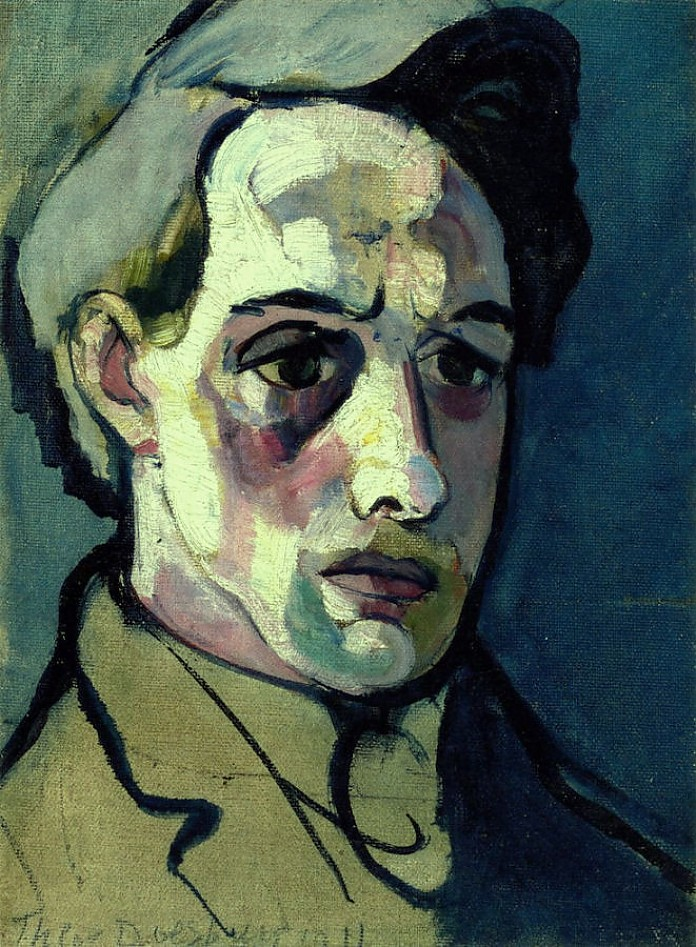
Self-portrait (1915)

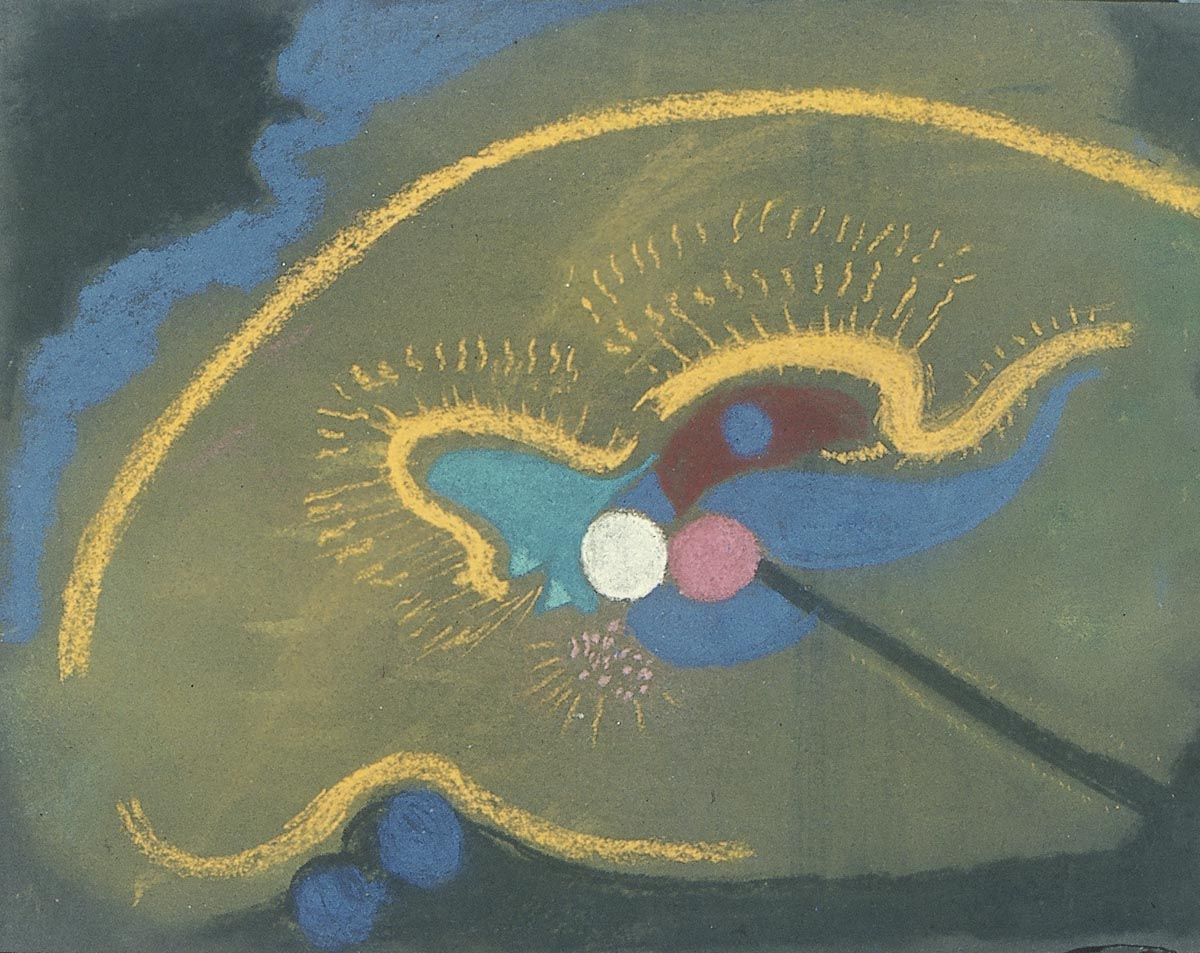
Composition, 1915

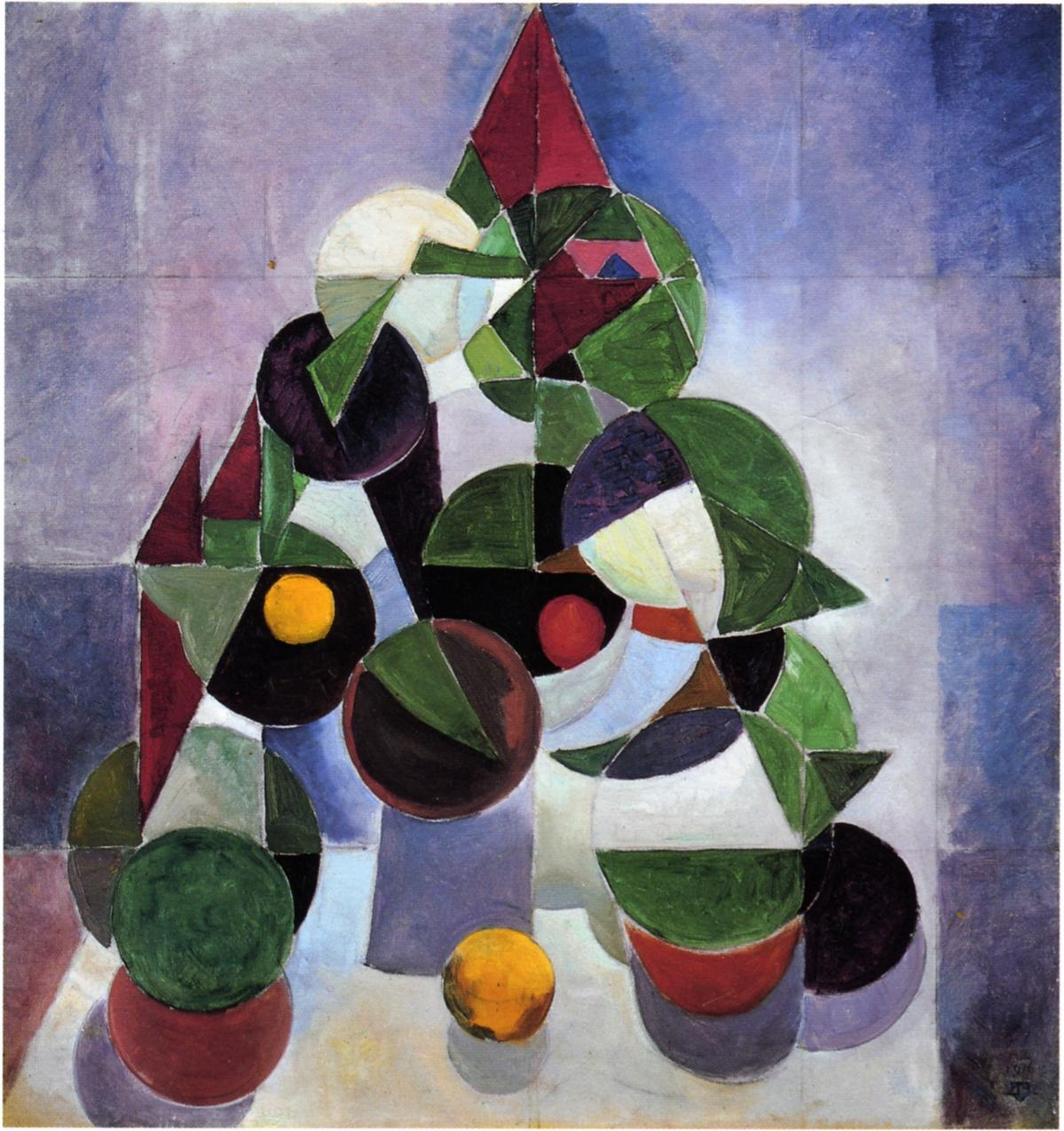
Composition I

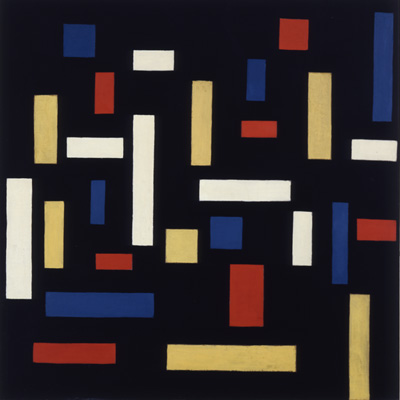
Neo-Plasticism: Composition VII (the three graces), 1917

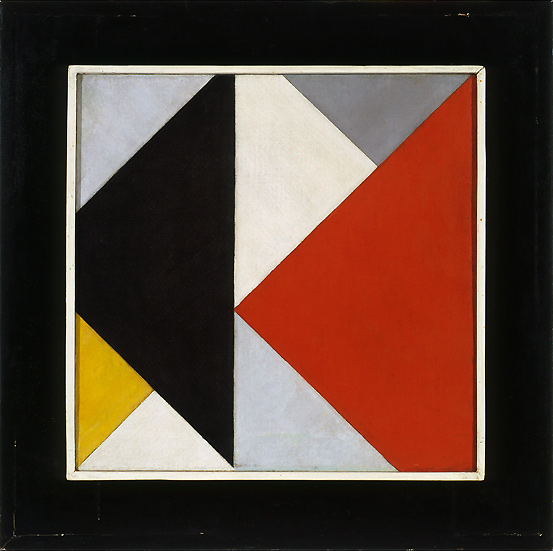
Counter composition XIII, 1929

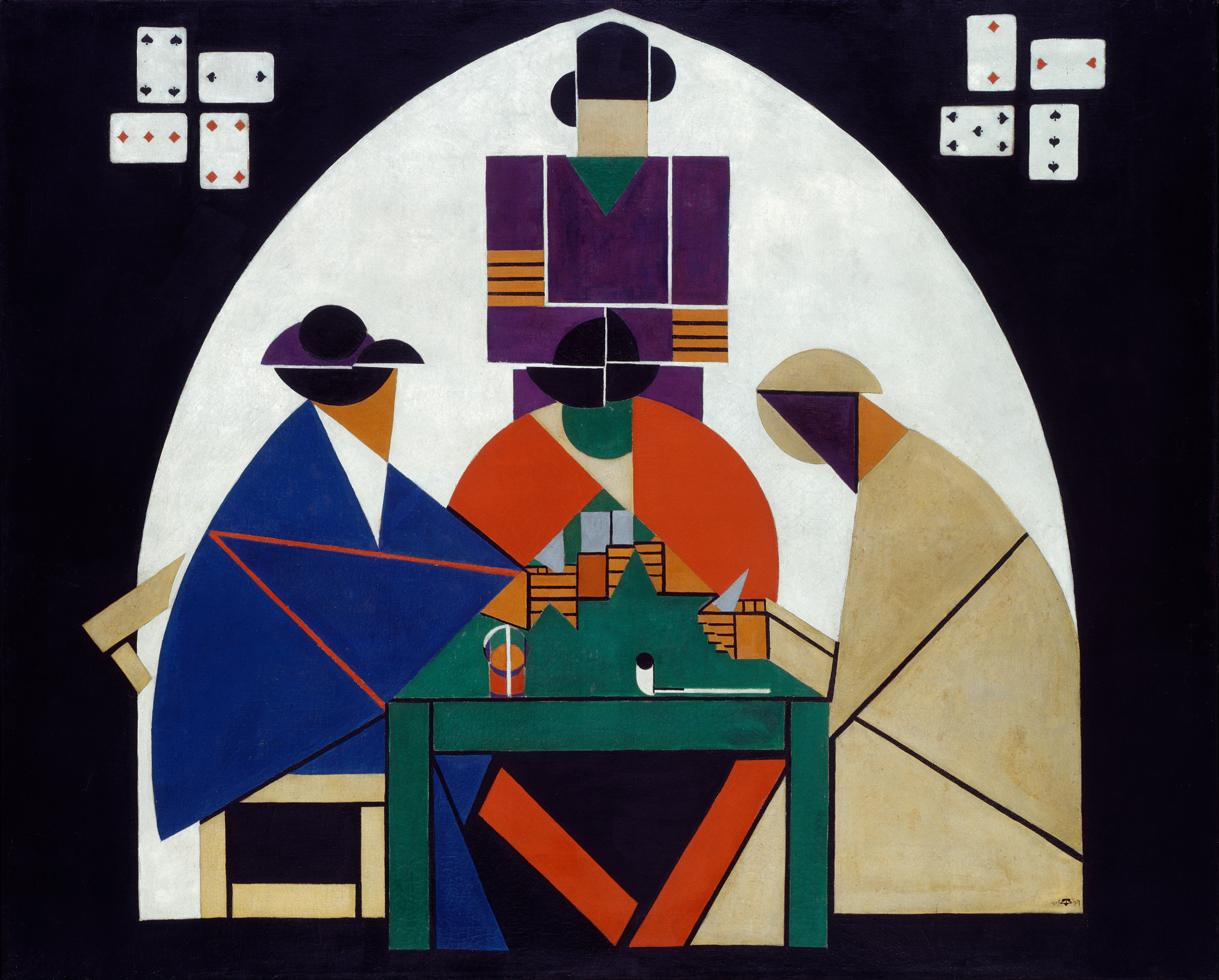
Card players, 1916–1917

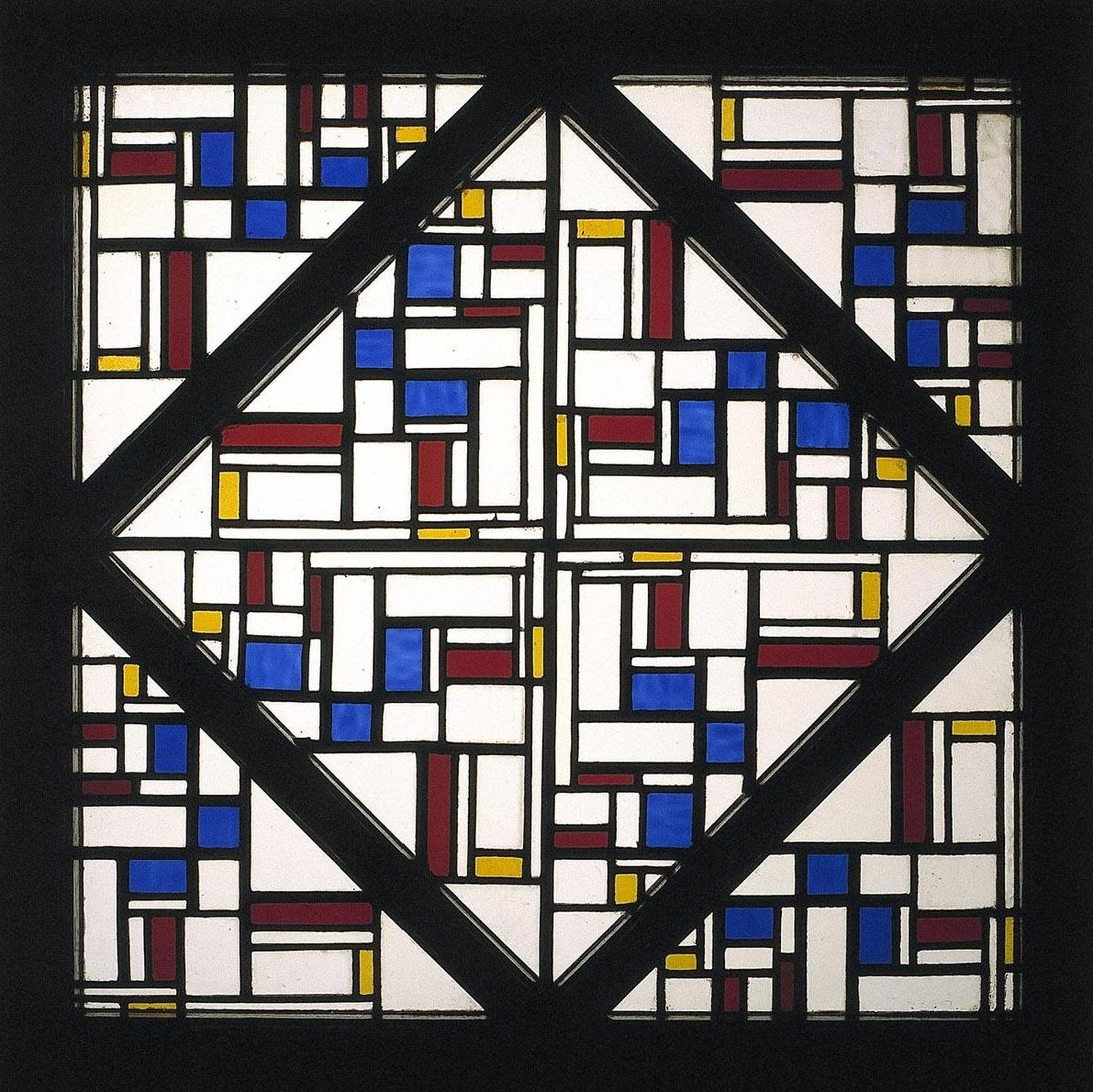
Composition with window with coloured glass III

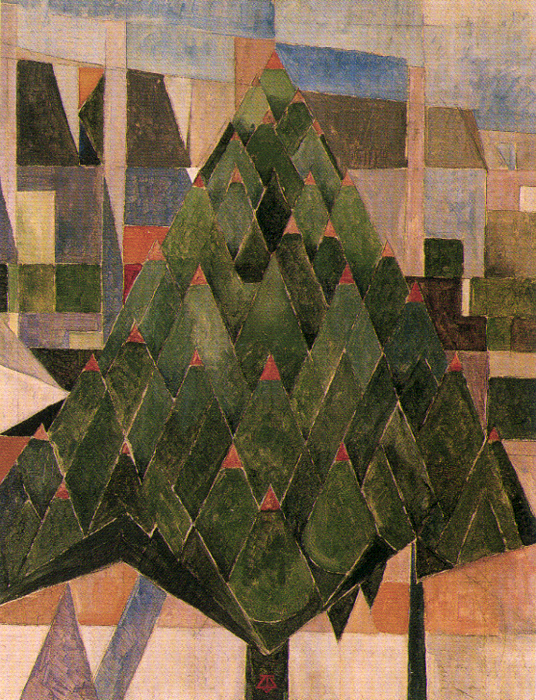
Tree

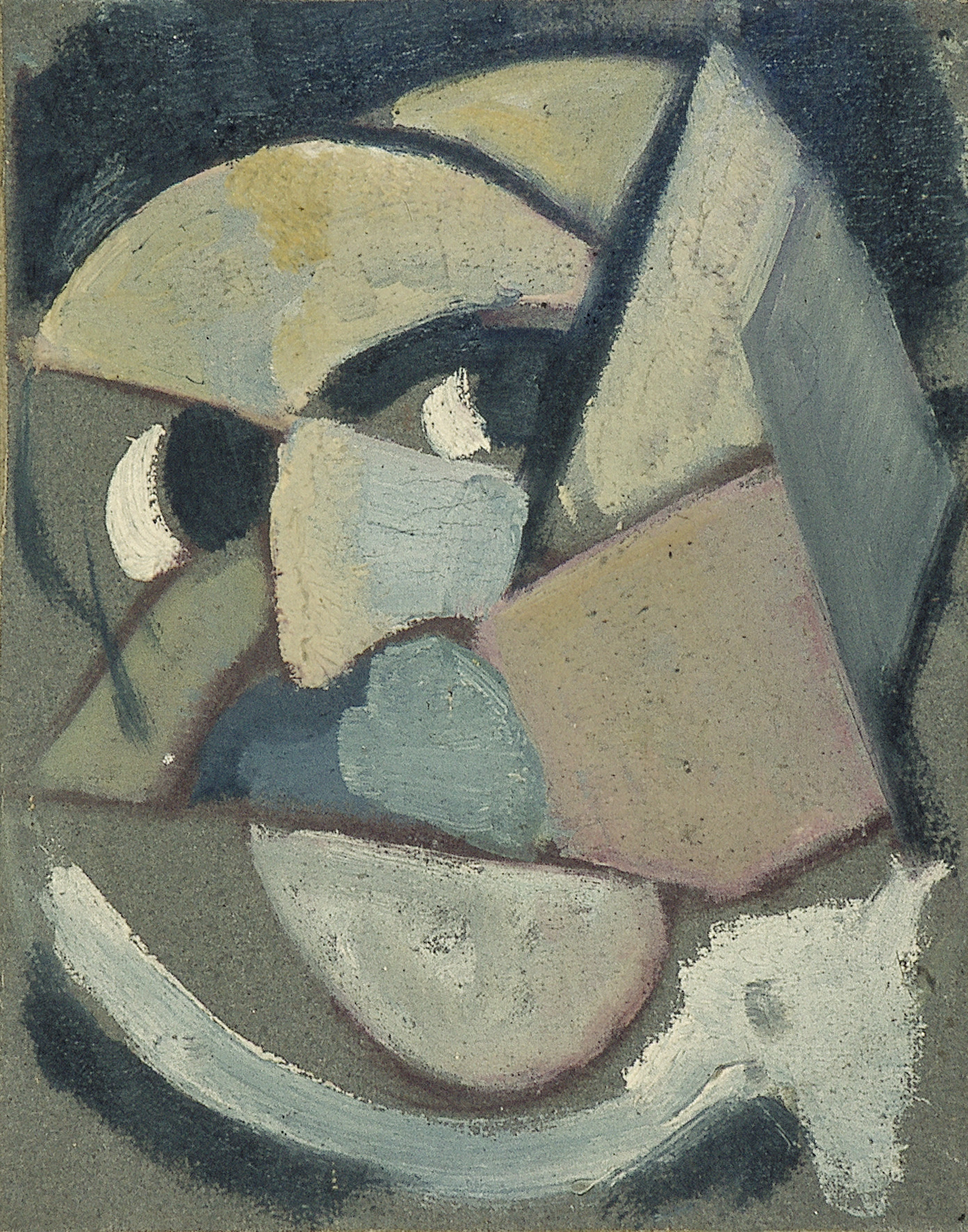
Abstract portrait

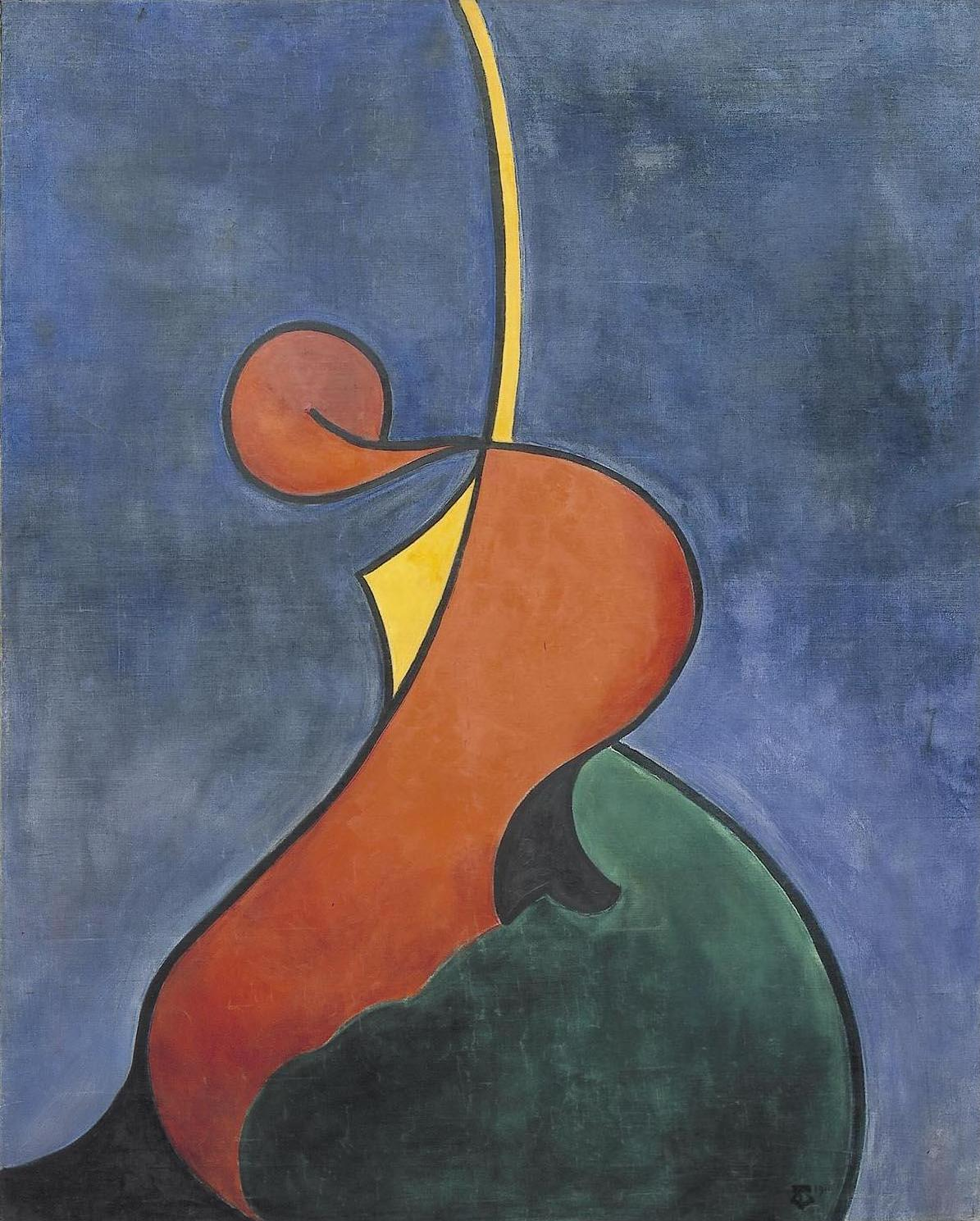
Mouvement héroïque

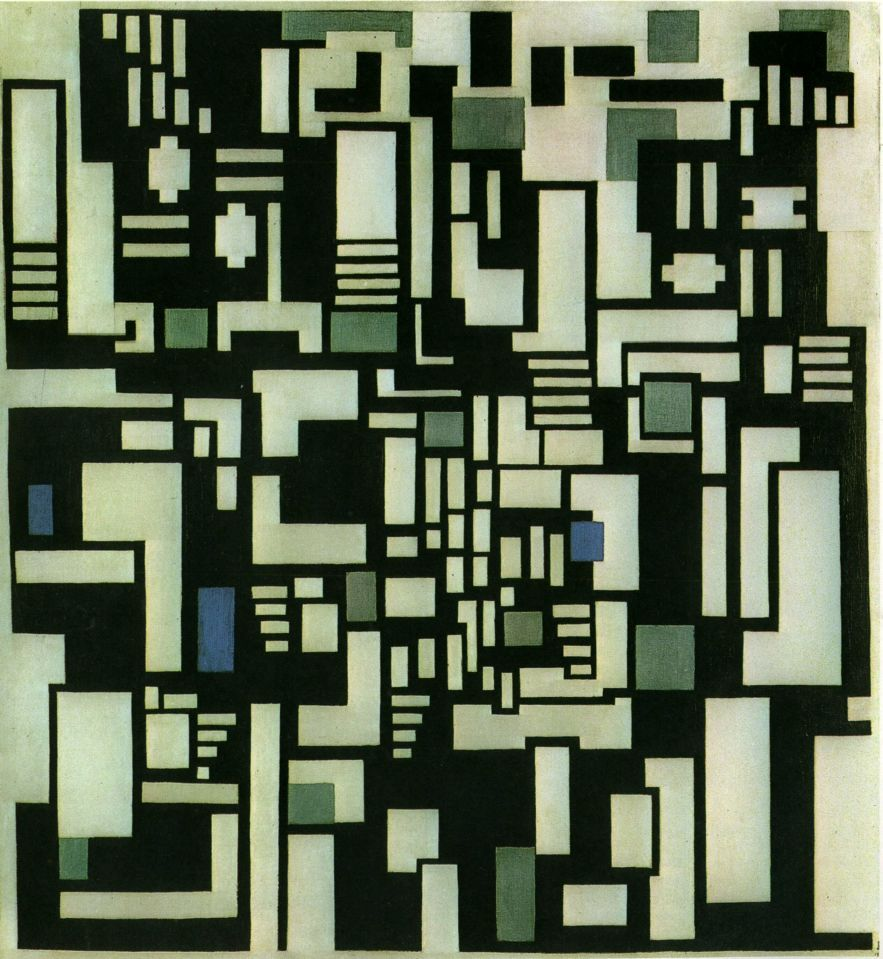
Composition IX

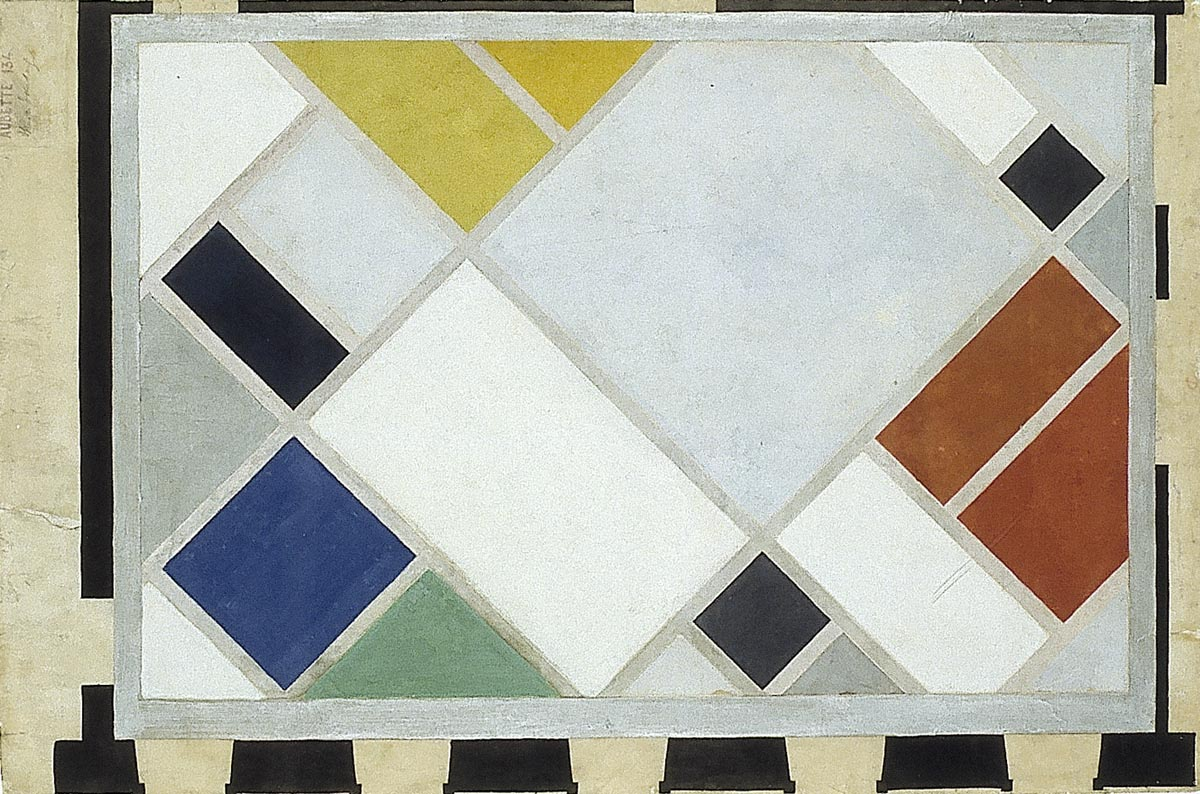
ceiling design for the Ciné-Dancing of the Aubette

== See also ==
- Counter-Composition of Dissonances XVI
- De Stijl
- Neoplasticism
- Elementarism
- Piet Mondrian
- Fourth dimension in abstract art
