= César Domela =

Dutch painter

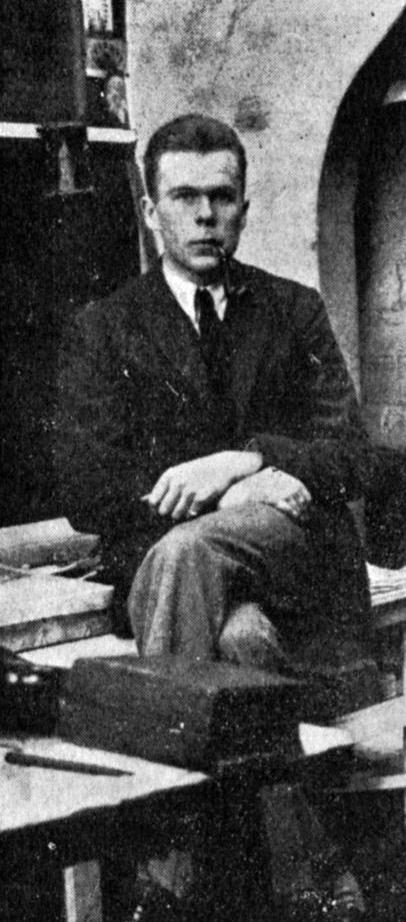
- Born: César Domela Nieuwenhuis; 15 January 1900; Amsterdam, Netherlands
- Died: 30 December 1992 (aged 92); Paris, France
- Movement: De Stijl

César Domela (15 January 1900 – 30 December 1992) was a Dutch sculptor, painter, photographer, and typographer, and a key member of the De Stijl movement.

== Life ==
He was born César Domela Nieuwenhuis in Amsterdam. His father, Ferdinand Domela Nieuwenhuis, was a former Lutheran pastor and influential anarcho-socialist member of the Dutch parliament. A self-taught artist, he lived from 1919 to 1923 in Ascona, Switzerland, developing his constructivist style, influenced heavily by cubism. Lacking a formal, artistic background, Domela's early art consisted of painted landscapes and still life where figures were reduced to geometric forms.

He relocated to Berlin in 1923, where he became friendly with members of the influential November Group. That same year, he painted his first painting without a subject, a composition of vertical and horizontal lines and planes. His first solo exhibition was held in 1924, at the Galeria d'Audretsch. In 1925, he became the youngest member of De Stijl, working closely with the famed Theo van Doesburg and Piet Mondrian. His work in this period often straddled several mediums. He concentrated on three-dimensional reliefs, often incorporating pieces of Plexiglas and metal as well as photomontages and cutouts from advertisements. Though he opened a silkscreen process studio for printmaking in 1934, relief was still his favorite medium and he developed the medium to a high art form. In 1936, he took part in an exhibition of Cubism and Abstract Art in the Museum of Modern Art in New York City.

Domela also experimented with typography and was commissioned to produce advertisements in Germany. When Hitler came into power in 1933, Domela fled Berlin and resettled in Paris, where he remained until his death in 1992. He was also forced to destroy a large part of his library, as it contained numerous books written by 'anarchists', many of which he had designed the books for.

In 1947 director Alain Resnais produced a film about César Domela, Visite à César Doméla (fr).

After Domela died, his vast archive of personal belongings and works was willed to the Netherlands Institute for Art History. In 2009, his two daughters Anne Dutter Domela and Lie Tugaye Domela donated a selection of nine of their father's works to the Strasbourg Museum of Modern and Contemporary Art, and a room inside the museum is now dedicated to the painter.
