= Nelly van Doesburg =

Dutch painter

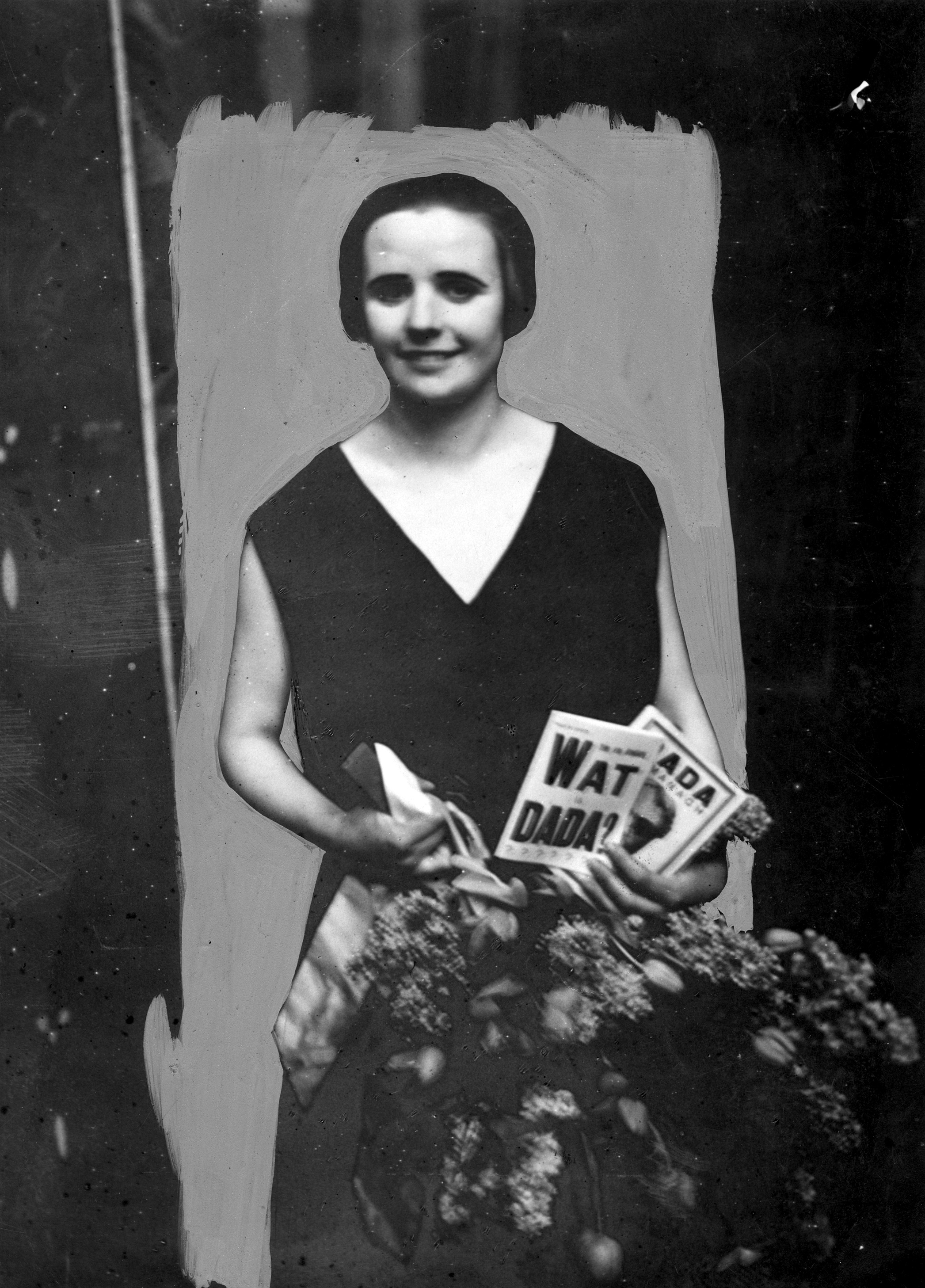
- Born: Nelly van Moorsel; 27 July 1899; The Hague, Netherlands
- Died: 1 October 1975 (aged 76); Meudon, France
- Other names: Cupera; Pétro van Doesburg

Nelly van Doesburg (née Petronella Johanna van Moorsel; 27 July 1899 in The Hague – 1 October 1975 in Meudon) was a Dutch avant-garde musician, dancer, artist and art collector. She performed under her dadaïst alias Pétro van Doesburg and used the pseudonym Cupera for her work as a painter.

== Biography ==
Nelly van Doesburg was born on 27 July 1899 as the daughter of shopkeeper Petrus (Piet) Bartholomeus van Moorsel and his wife Helena (Leentje) Maria Büch as the second youngest of the six van Moorsel children.

She started classical piano studies at the age of 14, graduating 4 years later in 1918. After which she continued her musical studies in Rotterdam for a time, while also working as a piano teacher.

In 1920 she met Theo van Doesburg through her brother, who had a subscription to the magazine De Stijl, published by Van Doesburg. During the opening of the La Section d'Or exhibition in The Hague on 11 July 1920, she was completely captivated by this man, and fell in love in what she later called a "coup de foudre". Her Catholic parents did not appreciate the association with Van Doesburg, who was not only Protestant, but also already married. Because of this, her parents came up with the idea to send her to a boarding-school for nuns in the UK, hastily sewing the wardrobe needed for this. She ran away from home around the turn of the year from 1920 to 1921 and was received in Leiden by J.J.P. Oud and Van Doesburg's wife Lena Milius. During her relationship with Van Doesburg she was introduced to the world of modern art. Van Doesburg took her with him on a lecture tour through Europe in March 1921, during which they also visited Piet Mondriaan in Paris.

From April 1921 she lived with Van Doesburg in Weimar. In December she spent a few weeks in Vienna to reflect on her future. Here she met the Hungarian artist Lajos Kassák, publisher of the magazine Ma. Aktivista Folyóirat (Present Activists Magazine). After this a correspondence between Kassák and Theo van Doesburg arose.

On 24 September 1922 she visited with Theo, Cor van Eesteren and others, the Städtische Kunstverein by Walter Dexel in Jena. The following day she played compositions by Vittorio Rieti during a dada evening at Hotel Fürstenhof in Weimar, in which Jean Arp and Tristan Tzara also participated.

In January–February 1923 she participated with her future husband and the artists Kurt Schwitters and Vilmos Huszár, under her stage name Pétro, in the Dutch Dada tour. During these evenings she played music by Satie and Rieti. Following this tour she played compositions by Arthur Honegger, Daniël Ruyneman, Francis Poulenc, Josef Hauer and Egon Wellesz during a "Modern Soirée" on 12 March at the Lily Green dance school in The Hague. "Proeven Van Stijlkunst" (Experiments In Artistic Style) by the composer Jakob van Domselaer also featured in her repertoire. The final performance, together with Schwitters took place on 14 February 1925 at the avant-garde-publisher Müller & Co. in Potsdam. In addition, under the pseudonym Cupera she made a number of paintings, in which influences from De Stijl can be recognized. In Paris she enjoyed some fame as a dancer under the name Sonia Pétrowska.

From 2 October 1929 to 5 January 1930 she organized the ESAC (Expositions Sélectes d'Art Contemporain) of "contemporary young Parisian painting" at the Stedelijk Museum in Amsterdam and Pulchri Studio in The Hague. Van Doesburg also participated in this exhibition under her pseudonym P. Cupera.

After Theo van Doesburg's death in 1931, widow Nelly van Doesburg committed herself to keeping the memory of her husband alive. She wanted to help change the one-sided image of Theo being primarily a follower of artistic movements instead of an innovator of modern art. To achieve this, she organized a series of exhibitions of his work. She also provided a good shelter for a large part of his paintings by selling them to the best collections of modern art in the world. Many paintings by Van Doesburg ended up in the United States, for example in the Museum of Modern Art and the Guggenheim collections, because Van Doesburg was friends with Peggy Guggenheim, who acted as her agent in America.

Though they shared a lot of their social circles, in the artistic avant-garde at the time, Peggy and Nelly did not meet in person until 1938 in London after which they developed a close friendship. During the Second World War Peggy bought several of the artworks in Nelly's collection, allowing Nelly to sustain herself in a time where there was practically no market for abstract art. While a few of these works were by Theo van Doesburg, it also included paintings by El Lissitzky, Giacomo Balla and Gino Severini. Nelly's influence on Peggy Guggenheim's collection didn't end here. Peggy preferred to buy works for her collection directly from the artists themselves, through her many connections and relations within the art-world Nelly was able to introduce Peggy to an array of abstract artists and subsequently helped broker a great deal of Peggy's acquisitions in that time.

In the fifties she also made some reproductions in silkscreen of her late husband's works. Van Doesburg's remaining collection, consisting mainly of archive material, studies, photographs and drawings, left Nelly van Doesburg to her cousin Wies van Moorsel, who donated it to the Dutch Nation in 1981. The collection is managed by the Netherlands Institute for Cultural Heritage and the Netherlands Institute for Art History.

She also remained active in the artists' circuit. She had a short relationship with the German architect Ludwig Mies van der Rohe, who helped her with setting up an exhibition of her late husband's work in Chicago in 1947. She was also, as an important witness of the entire Stijl movement, a good source for, among others, the book Holland Dada by K. Schippers. At the end of her life she returned to her roots and she became Catholic again.

Nelly van Doesburg died at the age of 76 from the consequences of breast cancer in the home and studio designed by Theo van Doesburg in Meudon, France.
