= Kok (surname) =

Kok is either a Dutch occupational surname, "kok" meaning "cook", or an alternate spelling for the common Chinese surname Guo. Kok is a quite common surname in the Netherlands, ranking 27th in 2007 (20,834 people).

Notable people with the surname Kok include:

- Ada Kok (born 1947), Dutch swimmer
- Adam Kok III (1811–1875), leader of the Griqua people in South Africa
- Alexander Kok (1926–2015), South African-British cellist
- Ann Kok (born 1973), Chinese Singaporean television actress and singer
- Antony Kok (1882–1969), Dutch poet, co-founder of De Stijl
- Bessel Kok (born 1941), Dutch businessman
- Boris Kok (born 1991), French-born Cambodian footballer
- Christiaan Kok (born 1971), Zimbabwean cricketer
- Debbie Kok (1963–2010), New Zealand football player
- Derek Kok (born 1964), Hong Kong actor
- Eelyn Kok (born 1978), Singaporean television actress
- Emma Kok (born 2008), Dutch singer
- Felix Kok (1924–2010), South African-British violinist
- Femke Kok (born 2000), Dutch speed skater
- George Kok (1922–2013), American basketball player
- Gretta Kok (born 1944), Dutch swimmer
- Huug Kok (1918–2011), Dutch singer
- James Kok (1902–1976), Romanian bandleader, musician, and arranger
- Jan Kok (1889–1958), Dutch footballer
- Jan Kok (1899–1982), Dutch pharmacist and rector magnificus
- Jito Kok (born 1994), Dutch basketball player
- Jocie Kok (born 1982), Chinese-Singaporean singer
- Kees Kok (born 1949), Dutch politician
- Marinus Kok (1916–1999), Dutch archbishop of the Old Catholic Church
- Marja Kok (born 1944), Dutch actress and film director
- Mary Kok (born 1940), Dutch swimmer
- Melanie Kok (born 1983), Canadian rower
- Mimi Kok (1934–2014), Dutch film and television actress
- Paul Kok (born 1994), Dutch footballer
- Peter Nyot Kok (died 2015), South Sudanese lawyer and minister of education
- Pieter Kok (born 1972), Dutch physicist
- Ralph Kok (born 1987), Dutch tennis player
- Robert Kok (born 1957), Dutch footballer
- Salomon Kok, Flemish Jewish diamond dealer and activist
- Teresa Kok (born 1964), Malaysian politician
- Tevin Kok (born 1996), South African field hockey player
- Vincent Kok (born 1965), Hong Kong actor, scriptwriter and film director
- Werner Kok (born 1993), South African rugby player
- Wim Kok (1938–2018), Dutch politician, prime minister of the Netherlands 1994–2002
