= Robert van 't Hoff =

Dutch architect and furniture designer (1887–1979)

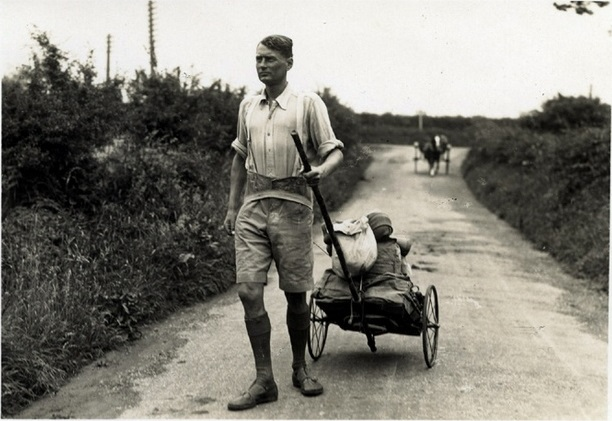
- Born: November 5, 1887; Rotterdam, Netherlands
- Died: April 25, 1979 (aged 91); New Milton, Hampshire, England
- Occupation: Architect
- Buildings: Villa Henny

Robert van 't Hoff (November 5, 1887 – April 25, 1979), born Robbert van 't Hoff, was a Dutch architect and furniture designer. His Villa Henny, designed in 1914, was one of the earliest modernist houses and one of the first to be built out of reinforced concrete. From 1917 he was an influential member of the De Stijl movement.

Although he was born to a comfortable middle-class background, married a wealthy heiress, and for a while was able to subsidise the publication of the De Stijl journal, van 't Hoff was a member of the Communist Party of the Netherlands in the years following World War I. Following the failure of Pieter Jelles Troelstra's call for a socialist revolution in the Netherlands in 1919, van 't Hoff split from De Stijl's founder Theo van Doesburg and withdrew from artistic activity, declaring himself an "ex-architect" in 1922, and spending much of the rest of his life promoting experimental anarchist communities.

== Life ==
=== Early life and education ===
Van 't Hoff was born in Rotterdam, the son of an eminent bacteriologist, and grew up in comfortable and cultured middle class circumstances. His mother had an interest in the visual arts and was a friend of the painter Willem Witsen (Willem Arnoldus Witsen), while his father was a friend of the psychiatrist Frederik van Eeden. From 1898 Robert accompanied his parents on visits to van Eeden's utopian Walden commune near Bussum.

The family moved to Bilthoven in 1904. The following year Robert assisted with the building of a house for one of his aunts and decided to train as an architect.

In 1906, on the advice of an architect friend of his father's, van 't Hoff travelled to England to study architecture at the Birmingham School of Art, which had been a major centre of the Arts and Crafts Movement since its reorganisation by Edward R. Taylor in the 1880s. Studying under William Bidlake, he came under the influence of the theories of William Lethaby and the work of the Glasgow School, and worked in the progressive architectural practice of Herbert Tudor Buckland.

From 1911 to 1914 van 't Hoff studied at the Architectural Association in London, where he became a friend of the cubist and futurist painter David Bomberg and through him became acquainted with the work of the avant-garde Omega Workshops.

=== Early career ===
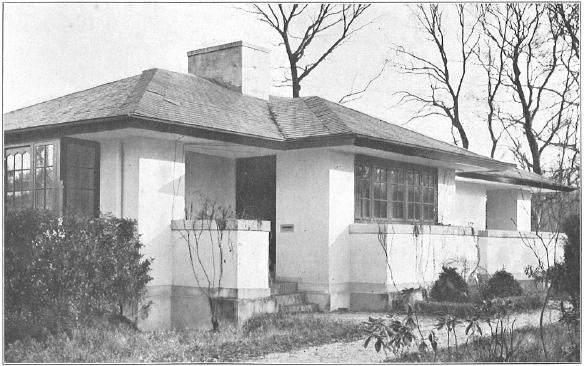
Villa Verloop, Huis ter Heide. 1915–1916.

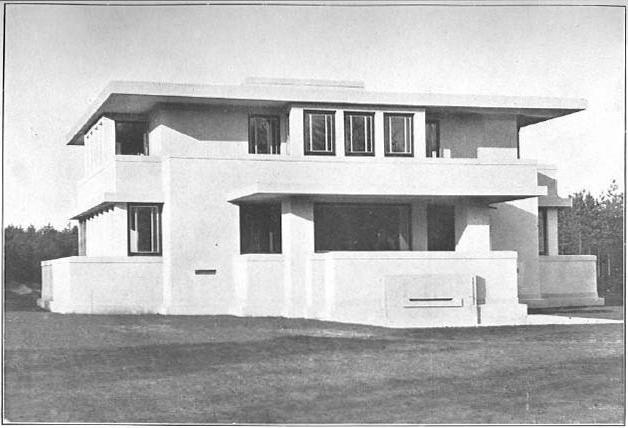
Villa Henny, Huis ter Heide, Utrecht. 1915–1919.

Van 't Hoff's first built works were designed while he was still based in England. Løvdalla – a house built for his parents in Huis ter Heide near Utrecht and completed in 1911 – featured an informal cluster of gables reminiscent of some of Buckland's work in Edgbaston, while De Zaaier was a model farmhouse built in Lunteren and completed in 1912, with a more distinctively Dutch design. Van 't Hoff's third house, built for the artist Augustus John at 28 Mallord Street, Chelsea, London, after the two met by chance in the pub, was both designed and built in 1913.

In 1913 van 't Hoff was given a copy of a German translation of Frank Lloyd Wright's Wasmuth Portfolio by his father. This made a profound impression and in June 1914 he travelled to the United States to see Wright's work in person, visiting the Unity Temple, Taliesin, Midway Gardens, the Larkin Administration Building and Wright's suburban houses in Oak Park, Illinois. Van 't Hoff and Wright discussed collaborating on a project for an art gallery on Long Island, New York that van 't Hoff had become involved with through his relationship with Augustus John, but the project did not progress and van 't Hoff returned to Europe.

Van 't Hoff's first work on returning from the United States was the Villa Verloop – a summer house in Huis ter Heide whose design bore the influence of Wright's Prairie Houses. His next work – the Villa Henny – which was an idealistic and experimental house in both design and execution. One of the earliest houses to be built entirely out of reinforced concrete, the Villa Henny used the freedom he had received to create a house with a flat roof, overhangs, receding walls and a geometrical outline that presented an modern profile compared to his earlier designs. The Villa Henny established van 't Hoff with the international avant-garde as a major figure in the emerging modern movement, gaining an influential and appreciative review from the architect Huib Hoste in De Telegraaf and attracting the attention of the emerging De Stijl group.

=== De Stijl ===
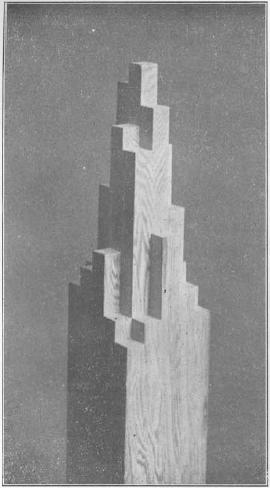
Banister post, c. 1919.

Van 't Hoff probably met De Stijl founder Theo van Doesburg some time in mid-1917. Their radical views on art and society had a natural affinity and by the end of the year van 't Hoff was in regular correspondence with van Doesburg and other members of the movement including Vilmos Huszár and J. J. P. Oud. Over the next two years he was to write five articles for the De Stijl journal – three radical essays on the future of architecture and two critical pieces on buildings by Jan Wils and Antonio Sant' Elia. Van 't Hoff went on to support the journal financially after van Doesburg split from its original publisher over his insistence on installing a separate architecture editor.

The range of van 't Hoff's design work also broadened around this time: he published designs for banister posts and chairs, and in 1918 designed a houseboat, which he christened De Stijl and in which he and his wife lived shortly after their marriage in July. This was conceived as an attempt to "further the new direction" and he was involved in every aspect of the interior and exterior design including the furniture and fittings. Van 't Hoff's preference for Bart van der Leck over van Doesburg for the painting of the interior was the first sign of tension between the two, but a commission for van Doesburg from van 't Hoff for a colour scheme for the interior of a house he was designing for the pacifist and anarchist Bartholomeus (Bart) de Ligt in Lage Vuursche suggested that there was no serious split.

During 1918 and 1919 van 't Hoff's ideological stance hardened in the light of the recent Russian Revolution. His design work at this time moved away from private houses and consisted largely of unrealised designs for prefabricated mass housing in association with the Utrecht architect P. J. C. Klaarhamer. In 1919 he joined the Communist Party of the Netherlands and was active in arranging an exchange programme with artists in the Soviet Union, making his political stance clear in a letter to fellow communist Chris Beekman: "I myself am convinced we will get a Soviet government, albeit that the transition will take a toll of some of our lives".

Van 't Hoff's attempts to influence the De Stijl group in a more avowedly political direction met with frustration, however. The first De Stijl manifesto, published in November 1918, was interpreted by most of the group's members as a largely artistic statement, rather than the revolutionary document van 't Hoff sought. Van't Hoff criticised Van Doesburg in the summer of 1919 for exhibiting individually rather than maintaining an exclusive commitment to the De Stijl collective. In October 1919 Van Doesburg failed to circulate a petition demanding free postal interchange with the Soviet Union that had been signed by leading Dutch artists and designers and this prompted van 't Hoff to make a final and decisively split from both De Stijl and van Doesburg, remarking that "In Russia they execute such people".

=== Later life ===
Disillusioned with the revolutionary potential of the artistic avant-garde, van 't Hoff sold his houseboat and moved to Laren in North Holland in 1920, where he built two small houses for himself and his parents that were largely devoid of the abstract aesthetic ambitions of his earlier works – one even had a thatched roof. Although these featured some furniture and interior design work by Beekman and Rietveld, van 't Hoff had distanced himself from his earlier artistic lifestyle. The tenth anniversary issue of De Stijl featured an open letter signed "Robert Van. ('t Hoff)., ex-architect."

In 1922 van 't Hoff moved to London with his family, spending most of the following five years promoting his communist and anarchist ideas in England and frequenting the British Museum Reading Room. In 1926 he published an anonymously authored social and political manifesto called Abolition, in which he called for a mass uprising. In 1928 he was invited by the American radical philanthropist Charles Garland to redesign the buildings on his utopian commune in Coopersburg, Pennsylvania. The two disagreed over the proposed designs, however, and within nine months the van 't Hoff family had returned to Laren.

Van 't Hoff retained some links with De Stijl during this period – continuing his correspondence with J. J. P. Oud, meeting Piet Mondrian in Paris in 1931 and financing the final issue of the De Stijl journal in 1932. The ill health of their daughter led the van 't Hoffs to move to Davos in Switzerland in 1931, but in 1937 they returned to England to settle permanently in Hampshire. The bombing of Coventry in 1940 profoundly touched van 't Hoff, who knew the city from his days studying in Birmingham and designed a large communal housing association building in the hope that the city could be rebuilt in accordance with his progressive ideals. In general, however, his last years in England were marked by increasing reclusiveness.

The architect realised his last work in New Milton, (Hampshire, U.K.). He designed an interior for his study in his own house in 1960. The atmosphere in the study was very similar to the interior of the houseboat De Stijl (1917). When the house was demolished in 2006, this interior was donated to the Kroller-Muller Museum in Otterlo (The Netherlands) by Van 't Hoff's daughter Megan.
