= Jan Kok =

Jan Kok may refer to:

- Jan Kok (footballer), medalist at the 1908 Olympics
- Jan Kok (pharmacist), professor and rector magnificus of the University of Amsterdam
