= MHJ =

MHJ or mhj can refer to:

- Moghol language, critically endangered language spoken in Herat province, Afghanistan
- Michael Hill Jeweller, jewelry company based in Australia, by stock ticker
- Marvin Harrison Jr. (born 2002), American football player
- Min Hee-jin (born 1979), South Korean music producer and art director
- Mahajan, a train station in India; see List of railway stations in India

== See also ==
- M. H. J. Schoenmaekers (1875 – 1944), Dutch mathematician and philosopher
