= Antony Kok =

Dutch poet and artist (1882–1969)

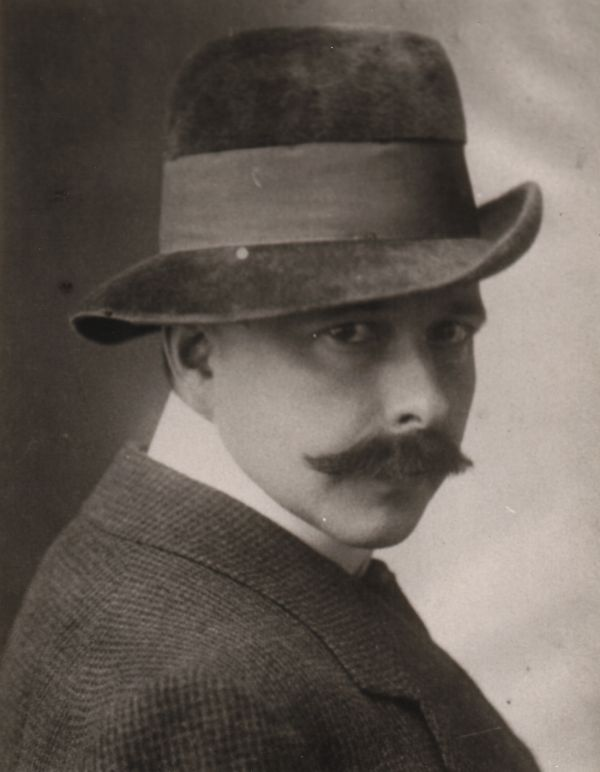
- Kok in 1915
- Born: 18 April 1882; Rotterdam, Netherlands
- Died: 29 October 1969 (aged 87); Haarlem, Netherlands
- Other names: Anthonij, Anthony, Anthonie, "Toon"
- Occupations: poet, author, railway official
- Movement: De Stijl, Dadaism

Antony Kok (18 April 1882 – 29 October 1969) was a key figure in the Dutch modernist movement De Stijl, contributing both as a poet and a supporter of the avant-garde visual arts.

== Biography ==
Anthonij Kok was born on 18 April 1882 in Rotterdam. He would later write his first name as Antony, but also as Anthony and Anthonie.

Kok initially worked for the State Railways, where he rose to the position of chief clerk. His career was marked by a blend of practicality and artistic engagement, and his early life in Tilburg set the stage for his introduction to the intellectual and artistic circles that would influence his work. Kok is variously described as a gardening expert, pianist, musical connoisseur and poet.

In 1914, Kok met Theo van Doesburg, the artist and theorist who would become a close collaborator. Van Doesburg was stationed near Tilburg due to his military service during World War I, and their connection led to the formation of a lasting partnership. Their work together focused on promoting modernist ideas, particularly through the establishment of the magazine De Stijl in 1917. Kok claimed in later interviews that he proposed the name De Stijl for the magazine.

The magazine's initial goal was to explore the intersection of modern literature and visual arts, but it would evolve into a major force in the Dutch avant-garde movement. Kok's involvement in the publication was significant, particularly through his poetry. His works, such as Reuk-engram (1917), received praise from van Doesburg, who admired Kok's innovative use of language.

Kok's early poetic works, often experimental in nature, showed his interest in new forms of expression, including klankpoëzie (sound poetry). Kok was one of the first in the Netherlands to experiment with this genre, influenced by van Doesburg's own avant-garde ideas.

Kok's friendship with van Doesburg was marked by an ongoing correspondence, which continued until van Doesburg's death in 1931. This correspondence became an important source for the history of the De Stijl and modernist literary movements.

Although Kok contributed significantly to De Stijl, his work was often subjected to van Doesburg's editorial vision. For example, Kok's poem Nachtkroeg was heavily edited by van Doesburg to remove traditional rhyme schemes, aligning it with the movement's abstract ideals. Kok's writing, especially in De Stijl, explored the relationship between art and modern life, with articles such as "The Modern Painting in the Interior" offering his reflections on the place of art in everyday spaces. Kok also signed the movement's manifestos, including those addressing the role of literature in modern art, which were published in De Stijl.

Kok's engagement with other avant-garde movements, including Dadaism, also shaped his later work. He was introduced to Dadaism through van Doesburg's publication of the Dadaist poem X-Images in 1920. Though initially skeptical, Kok eventually contributed to the movement with his translation of Tristan Tzara's poem "How to Write a Dada Poem". However, Kok remained more aligned with modernist poetry, contributing less frequently to Dada publications.

By the mid-1920s, Kok's poetic output slowed, and he shifted toward writing aphorisms. His focus on aphorisms, which he wrote obsessively until his death, represented a more introspective phase in his artistic development. These aphorisms were later published posthumously, and Kok's work gained increased recognition, especially in the 1950s, when De Stijl and the wider modernist movement experienced a resurgence of interest.

Kok's contributions to modern art were also reflected in his personal support for contemporary artists. He bought works from fellow De Stijl members, including Piet Mondrian and van Doesburg, as well as other avant-garde artists, including Lajos Kassák and El Lissitzky. His patronage helped sustain these artists, many of whom struggled financially during the 1920s. Kok's admiration for abstract art was also evident in his personal connections with artists, such as Mondrian, who appreciated Kok’s support and friendship.

In his later years, Kok turned increasingly to spiritualism and philosophy. His involvement in the Rosicrucian movement marked a shift in his intellectual pursuits. He remained active in philosophical circles and continued writing aphorisms, many of which were published posthumously.

Kok's legacy as a key figure in the De Stijl movement grew after his death in 1969, with exhibitions and publications dedicated to his work. Notably, his aphorisms were featured in a 1985 exhibition and in the 2000 publication Gedichten en Aphorismen.

Kok's final years were marked by health struggles, and he died in 1969 at the age of 87. His work has since been recognized as an important part of Dutch modernism, particularly for its contributions to the intersection of poetry, art, and philosophy in the early 20th century.

== See also ==
- Elementarism
- Neoplasticism

== Sources ==
- Baljeu, Joost (1974). Theo Van Doesburg. Studio Vista. ISBN 0289703581.
- Dautzenberg, J. A. "Antony Kok". Digital Library for Dutch Literature.
- Overy, Paul (1991). De Stijl. Thames & Hudson. ISBN 0500202400.
- Kok, Antony. "Biography". Antony Kok: experimental dichter (1882–1969).
- Blotkamp, Carel (1982). De Stijl: The Formative Years. MIT Press. ISBN 0262022478.
- Kok, Antony (2000). Gedichten en aforismen. Tilburg, Art Brut. ISBN 9076326029.
- Tromp, W.; Dautzenberg, J.A. (1989). Kok van De Stijl. Spoorwegbeambte te Tilburg. Oosterbeek. ISBN 90-6366-082-0.
- van Kempen, Hanneke. "Out of the closet: The sound poetry of Antony Kok". Antony Kok: experimental dichter (1882–1969).
