= Felix Kok =

South African-British violinist (1924–2010)

Felix Kok (1 August 1924 – 11 August 2010), was a South African-British violinist. He was leader of the City of Birmingham Symphony Orchestra from 1965 to 1988. Born in South Africa, he moved to Britain in 1938.

== Life ==
Kok was born in Brakpan in South Africa in 1924; his father, once a farmer, was a miner, and his mother played violin and piano. A teacher, noticing Felix's talent in playing the violin, encouraged him to have lessons in London. The family moved to Britain in 1938, and he attended Haberdashers' Aske's Boys' School; with a scholarship, he went to the Royal Academy of Music, studying with Rowsby Woof.

After graduating, he joined the Blech Quartet, playing second violin. In 1947, with his brother the cellist Alexander Kok, and pianist Daphne Ibbott, he formed the Beaufort Trio. He was sometimes guest leader of the Boyd Neel Orchestra; the violinist Peter Mountain said "We always enjoyed his leading – he led firmly and his playing had strength and truthfulness".

He joined the Philharmonia Orchestra, where the conductors he played under included Herbert von Karajan, Otto Klemperer and Wilhelm Furtwängler. From 1959 he was leader of the Bournemouth Symphony Orchestra, under conductors Constantin Silvestri followed by Charles Groves.

In 1965 Kok became leader of the City of Birmingham Symphony Orchestra (CBSO), remaining there until his retirement in 1988. During this period the conductors were Hugo Rignold, then from 1969 Louis Frémaux. After Frémaux's departure, Kok was on the selection committee that shortlisted Simon Rattle as conductor; the players then voted for Rattle's appointment in 1980.

In 1992, while in Portugal to set up a youth orchestra for the Gulbenkian Foundation, he slipped under a train in Porto. His left leg was amputated and he sustained other injuries. He was able to appear a few months later as guest leader of the CBSO for a run of ten opera performances.

In his last years Kok lived in an almshouse in London Charterhouse. He died in 2010 aged 86, from a stroke.

=== Family ===
In 1955 he married pianist Ann Steel; they often gave musical recitals together. They had three sons, including the conductor Nicholas Kok, and a daughter who predeceased her father. Ann died in 1998.
