= Karel Albert Schmidt =

Netherlands artist

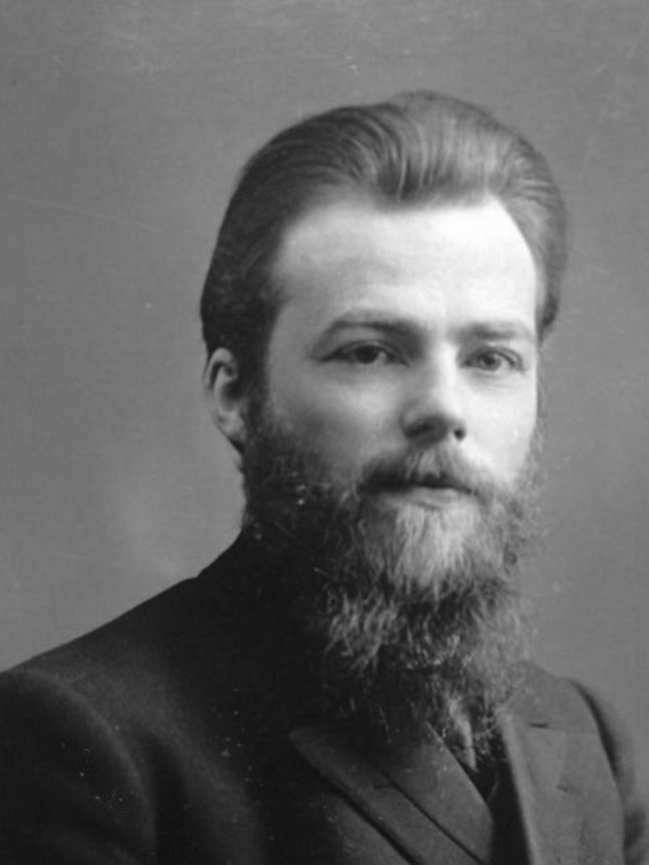
- Karel Albert Schmidt, c. 1915
- Born: 13 October 1880
- Died: 17 October 1920 (aged 40)
- Occupation: Artist
- Spouse: Johanna de Kruijf
- Children: 2 (Karel, Jolie)
- Website: https://karelschmidt.nl

Karel Albert Schmidt (Makassar 13 October 1880 – Blaricum 17 October 1920) was a Dutch painter, active as a lithographer, draftsman, and watercolorist. He was also active as an evangelist and writer, and gave open-air sermons in Zandvoort and lectures in the Gooi region. He became especially known for his expressionist-like paintings with Astral subjects.

== Life and work ==
Schmidt moved from the Dutch East Indies to Leiden in 1887. In 1910, he married Johanna de Kruijf, with whom he had three children. Shortly after his marriage, he settled in Blaricum. In 1914, he moved to Zandvoort, where he and his wife were severely abused because of his open-air sermons. For health reasons, Schmidt returned to Blaricum in 1915.

As a painter, Schmidt was self-taught and active in several European countries. He exhibited, among other places, in 1917 at the 10th Jury-Free Group Exhibition of the De Onafhankelijken in Amsterdam, Earlier that year, he had published an essay in their magazine De Wiekslag.

In Blaricum, he met Margaretha Verwey (1867–1947), sister of the poet Albert Verwey, who helped him establish the artists' society De Smeden (The Smiths), named after Schmidt's address in Blaricum. In the autumn of 1918, Schmidt played a significant role in a group exhibition at the Stedelijk Museum Amsterdam.

Schmidt died in Blaricum on Sunday, October 17, 1920, four days after his birthday. 1928 saw an exhibition of his work at the Free School in The Hague, which was critically acclaimed in De Telegraaf.

Many of Karel Schmidt's paintings and drawings were collected by the family as a collection and donated to the Dutch State in 2003.

== Images ==
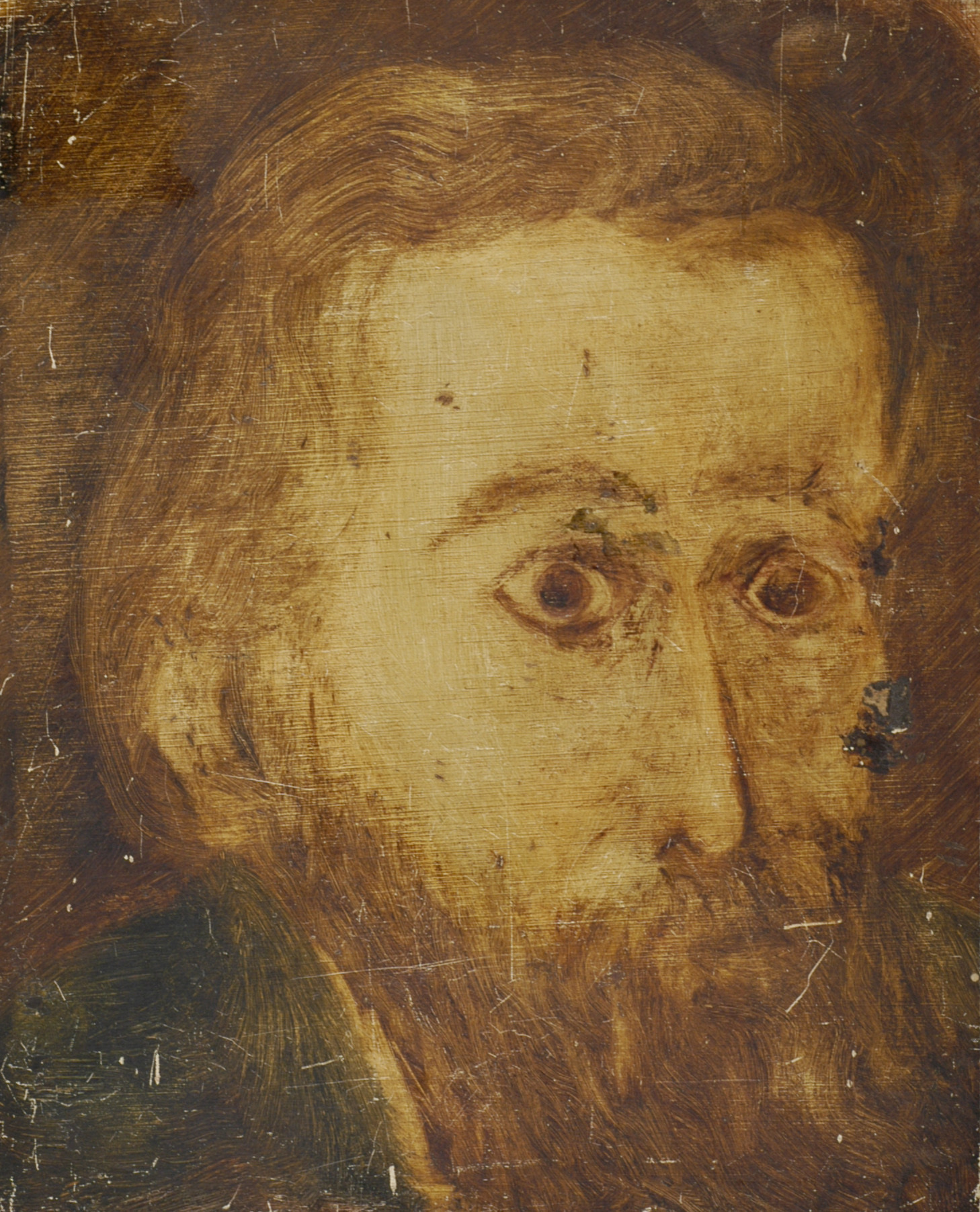
Self Portrait, c. 1905 – 1915

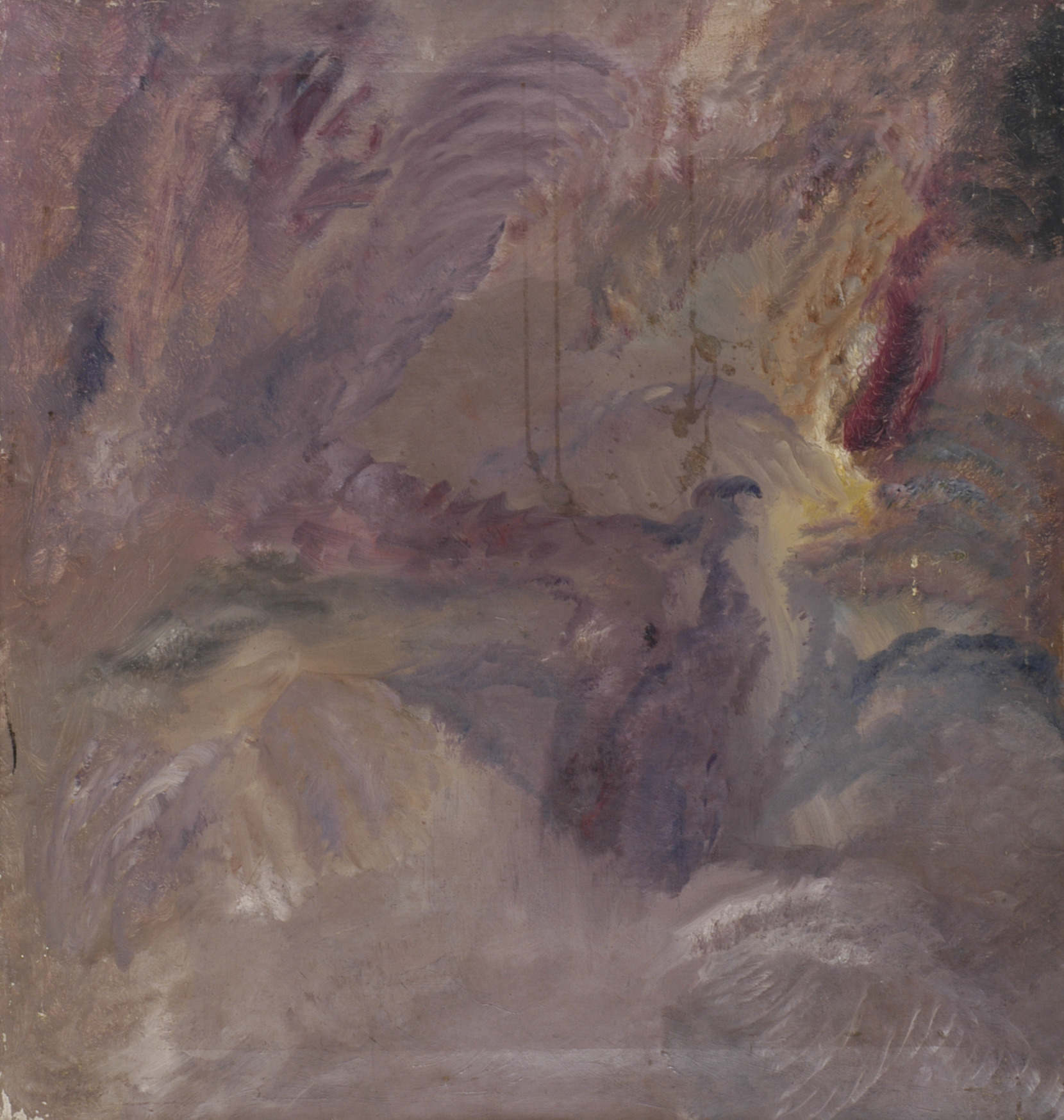
Apocalyptisch, 1917

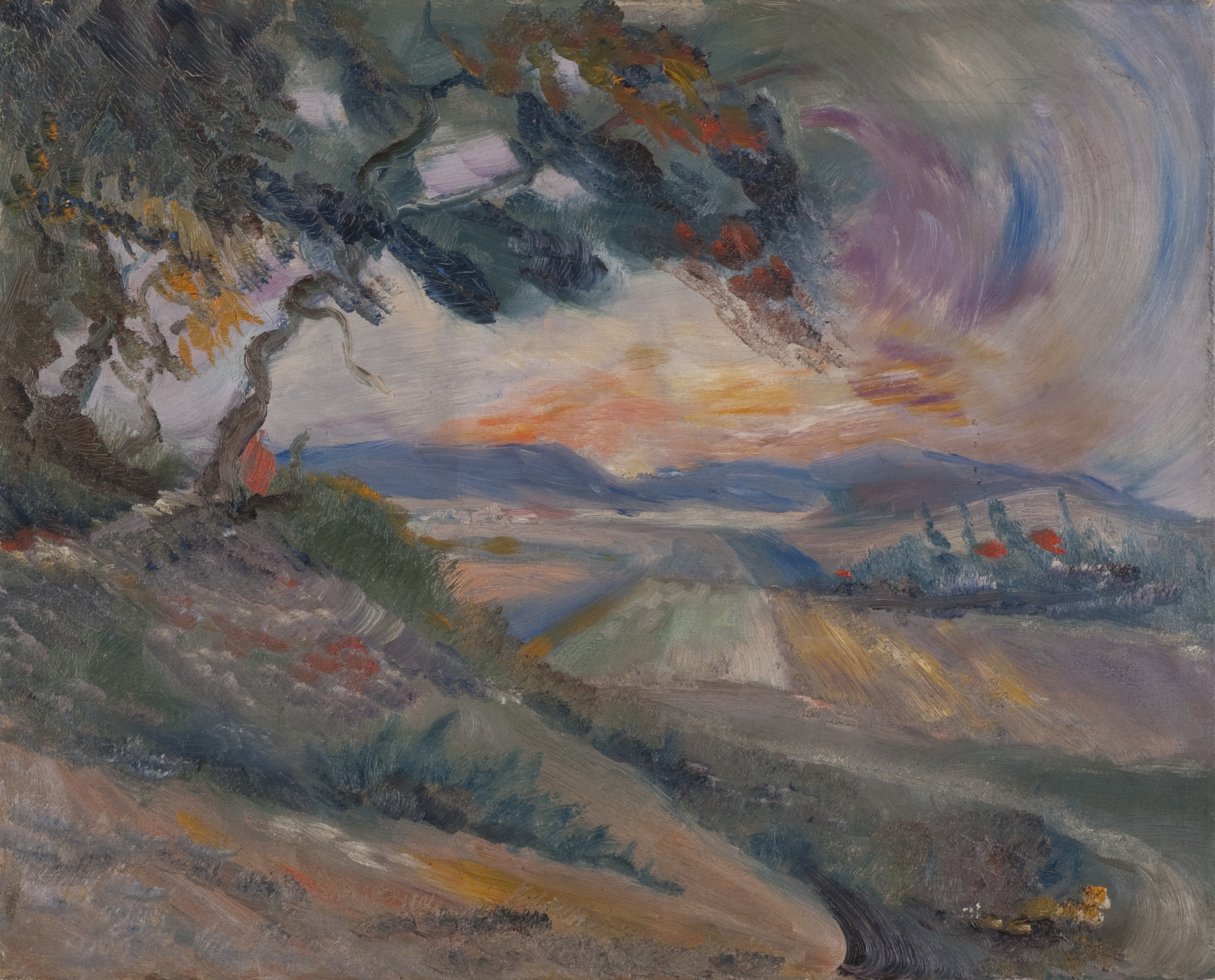
Landscape, 1919

== Further Reading (selection) ==
- Enzlin, G., "Karel Schmidt, Licht en waarheid." Panfilosofisch tijdschrift 814 (1920), pp. 353–357.
- Lien Heyting's De wereld in een dorp. Schilders, schrijvers en wereldverbeteraars in Laren en Blaricum 1880–1920, Amsterdam: Meulenhoff, 1994.
- Lien Heyting, "Een allemachtig genie; De bezielende krachten van de schilder Karel Schmidt", NRC Handelsblad, 26 augustus 1994
- Stibbe, M., ‘Tentoonstelling van schilderwerken van Karel Schmidt’, Ostara. Tijdschrift voor de Paedagogie van Rudolf Steiner. 3 (1928).
- Galina Gabriëlla Smeding. Karel Albert Schmidt: prediker, schrijver, helderziende en kunstenaar Een plaatsing van de persoon, zijn esoterische ideeën en zijn mensheidhelende oeuvre in zijn tijd, Universiteit Utrecht, Bachelor Eindwerkstuk, 02.04.2015.

== See also ==
M. H. J. Schoenmaekers
