= Fourth dimension in art =

Attempt to demonstrate the 4th dimension in visual arts

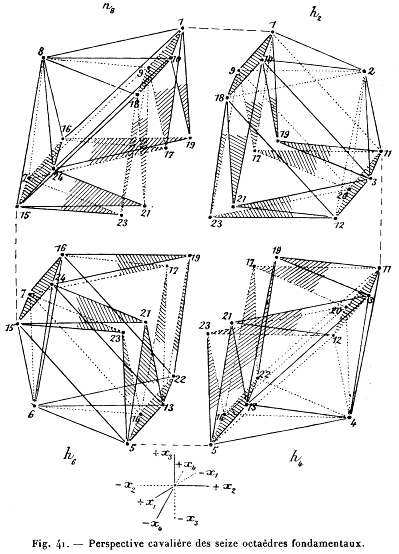
An illustration from Jouffret's Traité élémentaire de géométrie à quatre dimensions. The book, which influenced Picasso, was given to him by Princet.

New possibilities opened up by the concept of four-dimensional space (and difficulties involved in trying to visualize it) helped inspire many modern artists in the first half of the twentieth century. Early Cubists, Surrealists, Futurists, and abstract artists took ideas from higher-dimensional mathematics and used them to radically advance their work.

== Early influence ==
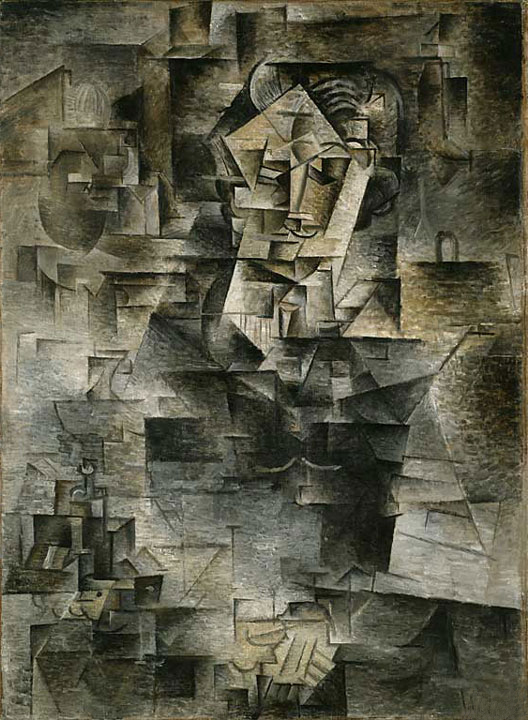
Pablo Picasso, 1910 Portrait of Daniel-Henry Kahnweiler, Art Institute of Chicago

Jean Metzinger, 1910, Nu à la cheminée (Nude). Exhibited at the 1910 Salon d'Automne. Black and white scan from Les Peintres Cubistes by Guillaume Apollinaire, 1913. Dimensions and whereabouts unknown.

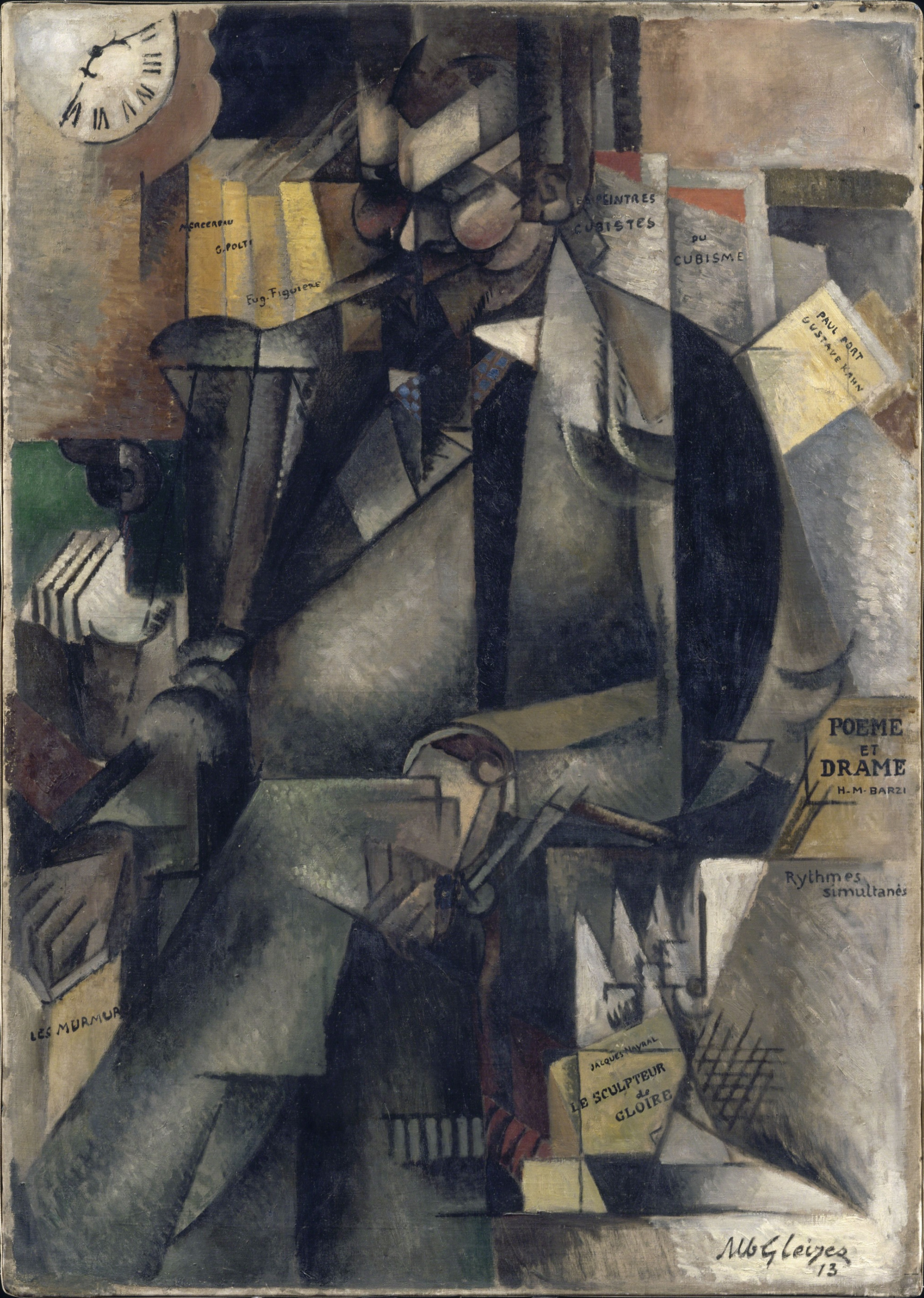
Albert Gleizes, 1913, Portrait de l’éditeur Eugène Figuière (The Publisher Eugene Figuiere), Musée des Beaux-Arts de Lyon

French mathematician Maurice Princet was known as "le mathématicien du cubisme" ("the mathematician of cubism"). An associate of the School of Paris—a group of avant-gardists including Pablo Picasso, Guillaume Apollinaire, Max Jacob, Jean Metzinger, and Marcel Duchamp—Princet is credited with introducing the work of Henri Poincaré and the concept of the "fourth dimension" to the cubists at the Bateau-Lavoir during the first decade of the 20th century.

Princet introduced Picasso to Esprit Jouffret's Traité élémentaire de géométrie à quatre dimensions (Elementary Treatise on the Geometry of Four Dimensions, 1903), a popularization of Poincaré's Science and Hypothesis in which Jouffret described hypercubes and other complex polyhedra in four dimensions and projected them onto the two-dimensional page. Picasso's Portrait of Daniel-Henry Kahnweiler in 1910 was an important work for the artist, who spent many months shaping it. The portrait bears similarities to Jouffret's work and shows a distinct movement away from the Proto-Cubist fauvism displayed in Les Demoiselles d'Avignon, to a more considered analysis of space and form.

Early cubist Max Weber wrote an article entitled "In The Fourth Dimension from a Plastic Point of View", for Alfred Stieglitz's July 1910 issue of Camera Work. In the piece, Weber states, "In plastic art, I believe, there is a fourth dimension which may be described as the consciousness of a great and overwhelming sense of space-magnitude in all directions at one time, and is brought into existence through the three known measurements."

Another influence on the School of Paris was that of Jean Metzinger and Albert Gleizes, both painters and theoreticians. The first major treatise written on the subject of Cubism was their 1912 collaboration Du "Cubisme", which says that:

"If we wished to relate the space of the [Cubist] painters to geometry, we should have to refer it to the non-Euclidian mathematicians; we should have to study, at some length, certain of Riemann's theorems."

The American modernist painter and photographer Morton Livingston Schamberg wrote in 1910 two letters to Walter Pach, parts of which were published in a review of the 1913 Armory Show for The Philadelphia Inquirer, about the influence of the fourth dimension on avant-garde painting; describing how the artists' employed "harmonic use of forms" distinguishing between the "representation or rendering of space and the designing in space":

If we still further add to design in the third dimension, a consideration of weight, pressure, resistance, movement, as distinguished from motion, we arrive at what may legitimately be called design in the fourth dimension, or the harmonic use of what may arbitrarily be called volume. It is only at this point that we can appreciate the masterly productions of such a man as Cézanne.

Cézanne's explorations of geometric simplification and optical phenomena inspired the Cubists to experiment with simultaneity, complex multiple views of the same subject, as observed from differing viewpoints at the same time.

== Dimensionist manifesto ==
In 1936 in Paris, Charles Tamkó Sirató published his Manifeste Dimensioniste, which described how the Dimensionist tendency has led to:

1. Literature leaving the line and entering the plane.
2. Painting leaving the plane and entering space.
3. Sculpture stepping out of closed, immobile forms.
4. The artistic conquest of four-dimensional space, which to date has been completely art-free.

The manifesto was signed by many prominent modern artists worldwide. Hans Arp, Francis Picabia, Kandinsky, Robert Delaunay and Marcel Duchamp amongst others added their names in Paris, then a short while later it was endorsed by artists abroad including László Moholy-Nagy, Joan Miró, David Kakabadze, Alexander Calder, and Ben Nicholson.

== Crucifixion (Corpus Hypercubus) ==
In 1953, the surrealist Salvador Dalí proclaimed his intention to paint "an explosive, nuclear and hypercubic" crucifixion scene. He said that, "This picture will be the great metaphysical work of my summer". Completed the next year, Crucifixion (Corpus Hypercubus) depicts Jesus Christ upon the net of a hypercube, also known as a tesseract. The unfolding of a tesseract into eight cubes is analogous to unfolding the sides of a cube into six squares. The Metropolitan Museum of Art describes the painting as a "new interpretation of an oft-depicted subject. ..[showing] Christ's spiritual triumph over corporeal harm."

== Abstract art ==
The concept of the fourth-dimension, and other geometries, influenced artists of the early twentieth century. The definition of the fourth-dimension differed from artist to artist: before Einstein, artists would associate the term with an extra spatial dimension; after Einstein's theory of relativity was vindicated in 1919, the fourth-dimension became associated with time rather than space.

Between 1913 to 1915, Piet Mondrian produced paintings employing the spatial interpretation of this principle in his Pier and Ocean series. By 1917 he had developed his theory of Neo-plasticism which excluded this principle in favour of colour planes and orthogonal lines on a flat surface. His close collaborator, Theo van Doesburg showed an early interest in the spatial fourth-dimension, later developing his interest to include the temporal dimension in his works. Mondrian rejected both interpretations in favour of stasis , and this difference of views played a major role in his departure from De Stijl in 1924. Van Doesburg went on to develop Elementarism, incorporating the dynamic concept of movement and expansion.

== Other forms of art ==
The fourth dimension has been the subject of numerous fictional stories.

== See also ==
- De Stijl
- Duration (philosophy)
- Elementarism
- Five-dimensional space
- Four-dimensional space
- List of four-dimensional games
- Mathematics and art
- Octacube
- Philosophy of space and time

== Sources ==
- Clair, Bryan (16 September 2002). "Spirits, Art, and the Fourth Dimension". Strange Horizons. Archived from the original on 7 January 2012.
- Dalí, Salvador; Gómez de la Serna, Ramón (2001) [1988]. Dali (Print). Secaucus, NJ: Wellfleet Press. ISBN 1-55521-342-1.
- Décimo, Marc (2007). Maurice Princet, Le Mathématicien du Cubisme (in French). Paris: Éditions L'Echoppe. ISBN 978-2-84068-191-5.
- Gleizes, Albert; Metzinger, Jean (1912). Du "Cubisme" (Edition Figuière). Paris.
- Henderson, Linda Dalrymple (2013). The Fourth Dimension And Non-Euclidean Geometry In Modern Art (Revised ed.). Cambridge, Massachusetts: The MIT Press. ISBN 978-0-262-58244-5.
- Jouffret, Esprit (1903). Traité élémentaire de géométrie à quatre dimensions et introduction à la géométrie à n dimensions (in French). Paris: Gauthier-Villars. OCLC 1445172. Archived from the original on June 9, 2011.
- Kruger, Runette (2007). "Art in the Fourth Dimension: Giving Form to Form – The Abstract Paintings of Piet Mondrian" (PDF). Spaces of Utopia (5). Spaces of Utopia: An Electronic Journal: 23–35. ISSN 1646-4729.
- Miller, Arthur I. (2001). Einstein, Picasso: space, time, and beauty that causes havoc (Print). New York: Basic Books. ISBN 0-465-01859-9.
- Oja, Carol J. (2000). Making Music Modern: New York in the 1920s. Oxford University Press, USA. p. 84.ISBN 9780195162578
- Robbin, Tony (2006). Shadows of Reality: The Fourth Dimension in Relativity, Cubism, and Modern Thought (Print). New Haven: Yale University Press. pp. 28–30. ISBN 978-0-300-11039-5.
- Sirató, Charles Tamkó (1936). "Dimensionist Manifesto" (PDF). Paris.
- Weber, Max (1910). "In The Fourth Dimension from a Plastic Point of View". Camera Work. 31 (July 1910).
- Blotkamp, Carel (1994). Mondrian: the art of destruction. Reaktion Books. ISBN 1 86189 100 8.
- Blotkamp, Carel (1982). De Stijl: The Formative Years. The MIT Press. ISBN 0262022478.
- Ubink, J. B. (1918). "De vierde afmeting [The Fourth Dimension]". De Nieuwe Gids. 33: 791–802.
- Baljeu, Joost (1968). De Vierde Dimensie [The Fourth Dimension]. Stejelijk van Abbemuseum.
