= M. H. J. Schoenmaekers =

Dutch philosopher (1875–1944)

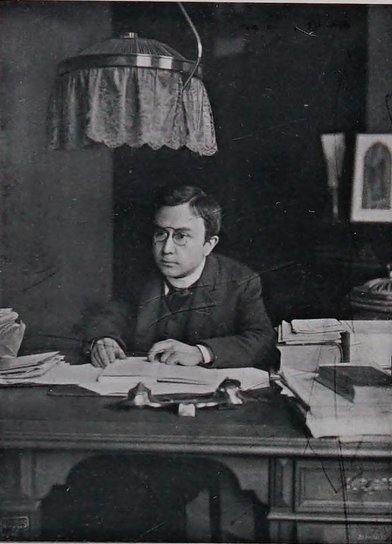
- Schoenmaekers in 1915
- Born: Mathieu Hubertus Josephus Schoenmaekers; 13 December 1875; Maastricht, Netherlands
- Died: 18 December 1944 (aged 69); Laren, Netherlands
- Education: Pontifical Gregorian University (PhD)
- Occupation: Catholic priest
- Spouse(s): Marie Eugénie Hubertine Dehaime (m. 1904; died 1908) Jacomina Jacoba Mallée (m. 1910)
- Children: 1

Mathieu Hubertus Josephus Schoenmaekers (13 December 1875 – 18 December 1944) was a Dutch Catholic priest, philosopher and theosophist who developed an esoteric philosophy called Christosophy. Active in early 20th-century Dutch intellectual and artistic circles, he was also a theorist of Formative Mathematics, whose ideas on geometry, colour, and polarity influenced Piet Mondrian's art theory of Neoplasticism and the De Stijl movement of Theo van Doesburg.

== Personal life ==
Mathieu Schoenmaekers was the son of Joannes Hubertus Schoenmaekers, a shopkeeper, and Hubertina Elisabeth Antoinetta Eberhard. His mother died after he was born, and so he was raised by his paternal grandparents, who were strict Catholics and convinced him to become a priest.

He married Marie Eugénie Hubertine Dehaime (1880–1908) on 8th September 1904. They had a son. After the death of his first wife, he married Jacomina Jacoba Mallée (1885–1966) on 25 November 1910. They had no children.

== Education ==
In 1896, he attended the Universitas Gregoriana in Rome, where he studied theology and philosophy. He was ordained in 1899, and received a doctorate in philosophy that same year.

== Career ==
He was appointed as professor of philosophy at Rolduc Abbey, Netherlands, but this was terminated shortly afterwards, owing to his inability to control the students. For a short time he was the assistant to a pastor in Munstergeleen, before leaving in February 1901 to study Dutch literature at the university in Amsterdam. This venture was terminated in September 1901 by his bishop, who appointed him the headmaster of the boarding school of Franciscan sisters in Bunde, Netherlands. It was during the holiday of Christmas 1902, whilst staying in Belgian monasteries, that he began to reflect on his life.

Schoenmaekers found the Catholic Church in Rome an oppressive organisation with little room for genuine religious experience. In August 1903 he broke with the Catholic Church, without abandoning his faith, and moved back to Amsterdam, where he met liberal Christians and moved in literary circles. On 1st July 1904 he founded and published the radical journal Levensrecht.

In 1905, Schoenmaekers joined the Theosophical Society, where he felt he might find kindred spirits, however he later cancelled his membership. By 1907 he had written several books and was presenting himself as a new spiritual leader. In 1911, he articulated a spiritual philosophy rooted in the Western esoteric and mystical tradition, which he expounded in his book Christosophie, where he developed the concept of Almensch - in contrast to Nietzsche's Übermensch.

From 1911 to 1912, he studied in Meadville Theological School, Pennsylvania, returning to live in Blaricum, Netherlands, and later settling in Laren, Netherlands, in November 1912. There he focussed on becoming a philosopher and writing religious books. After writing The New Worldview in 1915, and Principles of Formative Mathematics in 1916, he succeeded in influencing several avant-garde artists living in Laren. This included Piet Mondrian, who had already developed his theory of "the new visual arts" by 1914, but found Schoenmaekers' ideas in tune with his own. Other artists influenced by Schoenmaekers included: Theo van Doesburg, Bart van der Leck, Karel Albert Schmidt, sculptor Georges Vantongerloo and the composer Jakob van Domselaer.

In Laren, he confined himself to explaining his ideas and philosophy to a small group of followers, most of whom found him endearing and friendly. His ideas were incomprehensible to most people and, since he disliked contradiction, he avoided polemics. Although he was a talented orator, he gradually repelled more people than he attracted with his ideas. By 1920 his influence was waning, so much so that by the 1930s he was almost forgotten.

== Philosophy ==
Schoenmaekers was fascinated by the "mystery of nature" and the "inner structure of reality" which, he felt, could be explained through the opposing and complementary relationships underlying the structure of the universe; relationsips such as inner and outer, or masculine and feminine. He used the philosophy of "positive mysticism" and the method of "formative mathematics" to reveal this mystery. He felt the best way to express it was by using the visual geometry of mathematics: points, lines, planes, surfaces, circles, and ellipses. He utilised the word "beeldend" to express a shaping or forming essence. Therefore, Schoenmaekers' "formative mathematics" is a way of elucidating the mysteries of the universe, rather than a development of the discipline of mathematics.

== Publications ==
In the Netherlands, he published several books and articles throughout his life. Two of his most influential books were: Het Nieuwe Wereldbeeld (The New Worldview) in 1915 and Beginselen der beeldende wiskunde (Principles of Formative Mathematics) in 1916, both of which influenced Piet Mondrian's art theory of Neoplasticism and the De Stijl group.

== Bibliography ==
=== Books ===
- Gewijde Wijsbegeerte & Beeldende Wiskunde (1947) - six lectures on Sacred Philosophy & two lectures on Formative Mathematics
- Beeldende Wiskunde (1938) - two lectures on Formative Mathematics
- Gewijde Wijsbegeerte (1936) - six lectures on Sacred Philosophy
- Inleiding tot de Gewijde Wijsbegeerte (1933)
- De Wereldbouw (1926)
- Esoterisch Katholicisme (1923)
- Beginselen der Beeldende Wiskunde (1916)
- Het Nieuwe Wereldbeeld (1915)
- Oorsprong en wezen van den modernen wereldoorlog (1914)
- Mensch en Natuur (1913)
- Christosophie (1911)
- Over het principiëele verschil tusschen geloovig en ongeloovig (1911)
- Het Geloof van den Nieuwen Mensch (1907, 1908, 1912, 1914)
- Het Evangelie Der Aarde (1907, 1917)
- Levenswil (1905)
- Ontgin U Zelven (1905, 1906)
- Liefde en Huwelijk (1904)
- Christendom en Dogma (1903)
- Waarom gelooft gij? (1902)
- De Wereldorde (1900)

=== Articles ===
- Zinzeggende beeldspraak (1936)
- Over het wezen van religie (1923)
- Gedichten van leven en rust (1922)
- Klankwaarde van het woord (1922)
- Levenswoorden Woordenboek (1921)
- Kunst en gedachte (1921)
- Eenheid van geloof en weten (1916)
- Naar aanleiding der Suffragettenbeweging (1913)
- Overdenkingen (1913) - I and II
- Idealisten Monologenspel in eén bedrijf (1909)
- Maria Mysteriespel in drie tafereelen (1909)
- Natuurkennis van den Nieuwen Mensch (1908)
- Het evangelie der aarde (1906)
