= Elementarism =

Modernist art theory

Elementarism (also referred to as Counter-Composition) is an art theory formulated by Theo van Doesburg after 1923 as an extension and evolution of the De Stijl movement. De Stijl, co-founded by Van Doesburg, Piet Mondrian, and other artists, initially adopted Neoplasticism — a strict artistic framework characterized by geometric abstraction and equilibrium achieved through the use of horizontal and vertical lines. Elementarism is a loosening of the strictures of Neoplasticism by incorporating additional elements into the established aesthetic framework, thereby advancing the development of De Stijl by extending the means of expression.

== Key features ==
- Dynamics: Elementarism challenges the static nature of Neoplasticism by embracing the dimensions of time and space, moving beyond the two-dimensional constraints of its predecessor. It introduces dynamics to counterbalance the static qualities of Neoplasticism, liberating artists from rigid dualities such as horizontal and vertical. This approach expanded creative possibilities, incorporating dynamic sloping planes and oblique lines to complement the static orthogonality central to Neoplasticism.
- Color as Matter: Elementarism delves into the interplay between architecture and painting, emphasizing the connection between construction and composition. It views the plastic expression of space as inseparable from light. Treating color as both material and an architectural element, Elementarism used it as a medium for spatial expression. While maintaining the primary colors (red, blue, yellow) and non-colors (black, white, grey) of its predecessors, it expands to include the hues and textures of modern materials such as concrete, iron, and glass. This approach explored the dynamic energies, tensions, and contrasts inherent in these colors and materials.
- Asymmetry and Imbalance: Through the use of diagonals and asymmetrical designs, Elementarism embraces imbalance, movement, and contrast, offering a dynamic counterpart to Neoplasticism’s pursuit of balance, stasis, and harmony.

== Evolution of Elementarism and Divergence from Neoplasticism ==
Theo van Doesburg's theory of Elementarism emerged from his evolving views on Neoplasticism, leading to a departure from the strict principles upheld by Piet Mondrian. While Mondrian adhered to the exclusive use of horizontal and vertical lines to express equilibrium and balance, Van Doesburg introduced diagonal lines, which he believed added contrast and dynamism to his "counter-compositional" works. This innovation marked a shift in Van Doesburg's artistic philosophy, adding dynamic expression to the static balance of Neoplasticism.

Van Doesburg argued that Neoplasticism's reliance on horizontal and vertical lines to symbolize equilibrium between nature and spirit ultimately limited the evolution of art. To transcend these constraints, he proposed Elementarism as an enriched artistic framework, incorporating a dynamic counter-principle to the static balance of Neoplasticism. According to Van Doesburg, this dynamic element represented a "new polarity" on a higher plane, advancing artistic expression and accommodating the evolving human spirit.

The philosophical and aesthetic rift between Van Doesburg and Mondrian culminated in Mondrian's departure from De Stijl in 1924. The introduction of diagonal lines in Van Doesburg's counter-compositions is widely cited as a primary reason for this split. However, interpretations vary: some suggest Mondrian's opposition was less about diagonal lines per se and more about preserving the orthogonal relationships essential to Neoplasticism. Others have argued that Mondrian's disagreement with Van Doesburg centred around the incorporation of the fourth dimension as time into art, which he considered a divergence from the group's foundational principles.

Reflecting on the evolution of De Stijl, Van Doesburg wrote in 1929 for the journal Neue Schweizer Rundschau:

"Through an ever-vibrant and multifaceted development, the principles primarily developed by P. Mondrian in De Stijl could no longer be regarded as generally characteristic of the group's mindset. As the realization became ever richer and more diverse, we expanded into new areas; as a synthesis of the newly acquired insights and possibilities, Elementarism emerged. In the concept of 'elementary design,' everything that we have recognized as essential and universally valid in our work from the beginning up to today was united."

This statement underscores Van Doesburg's vision of Elementarism as an evolution of De Stijl's principles, uniting earlier insights with new possibilities for artistic expression.

== Impact ==
- Elementarism influenced architecture, design, and painting, promoting greater creativity within the abstract art framework.
- Elementarism is most prominently seen in Van Doesburg's architectural designs, such as his collaboration on the Aubette in Strasbourg, where he applied these principles to interior design.

Elementarism was an important development in the evolution of modern art, marking a shift toward greater freedom in abstract composition while still adhering to many of De Stijl's foundational principles.

== Sources ==
- "Elementarism". Encyclopedia of Art History.
- Baljeu, Joost (1974). Theo Van Doesburg. Studio Vista. ISBN 0289703581.
- Overy, Paul (1969). De Stijl. Studio Vista. SBN 289796210.
- Overy, Paul (1991). De Stijl. Thames & Hudson. ISBN 0500202400.
- Blotkamp, Carel (1982). De Stijl: The Formative Years. The MIT Press. ISBN 0262022478.
- Blotkamp, Carel (1994). Mondrian: the art of destruction. Reaktion Books. ISBN 1 86189 100 8.
- Jaffé, Hans L. C. (1970). De Stijl. Thames & Hudson. ISBN 0500-18096-2.
- "Neue Schweizer Rundschau: 1926-1955". ETH Zürich. ETH-Bibliothek.
- Ubink, J. B. (1918). "De vierde afmeting [The Fourth Dimension]". De Nieuwe Gids. 33: 791–802.
- Baljeu, Joost (1968). De Vierde Dimensie [The Fourth Dimension]. Stejelijk van Abbemuseum.

== See also ==
- De Stijl
- Neoplasticism
- Piet Mondrian
- Theo van Doesburg
- Fourth dimension in art
