= Peter Mountain =

English violinist (1923 - 2013)

Peter Mountain (3 October 1923 – 11 January 2013) was an English violinist. During his career he played in several British orchestras; interested in music education, he was leader of the BBC Training Orchestra, and an academic at the Royal Scottish Academy of Music and Drama.

== Life ==
Mountain was born in Shipley, West Yorkshire, and aged 16 he won a scholarship to the Royal Academy of Music, where he studied under the violinist Frederick Grinke. In 1943 he was conscripted into the Royal Marines Band; in 1945 to 1946 he led a services orchestra on a tour of south-east Asia.

In 1947 he joined the Boyd Neel String Orchestra, and later was a founding player of the Philharmonia Orchestra. He was also a chamber musician, and performed as a duo with his wife Angela Dale, a pianist: the duo continued through his career.

He was appointed leader of the Liverpool Philharmonic Orchestra in 1955. In 1966 he returned to London, joining the London Philharmonic Orchestra as principal second violin; in London he also played with the English Chamber Orchestra and other ensembles.

In 1968 the BBC Training Orchestra (later known as the Academy of the BBC), based in Bristol, was founded, and Mountain was appointed leader. The conductor was Meredith Davies, and its members were recently graduated orchestral professionals. The orchestra closed in 1975. In that year he became head of strings at the Royal Scottish Academy of Music and Drama in Glasgow. During this period of his career he was chief string coach of the National Youth Orchestra of Scotland from its formation in 1979, and was guest leader of orchestras including the BBC Scottish Symphony Orchestra. He was chairman of the Scottish Society of Composers; he commissioned works from its members for himself and his wife to play. He remained at the Academy until retirement in 1990.

Retiring to West Yorkshire, Mountain became head of strings for Bradford Education. He was awarded an honorary doctorate by the University of Bradford. His wife died in 2004; he gave up playing and teaching, afterwards writing and arranging music. Two volumes of autobiography were published: Scraping a Living (2007) and Further Scrapings (2009). He died in 2013, survived by a son and two daughters.
