= Alexander Kok =

South African-British cellist (1926–2015)

Alexander "Bobby" Kok (14 February 1926 – 1 May 2015) was a South African-born British professional cellist.

== Early life ==
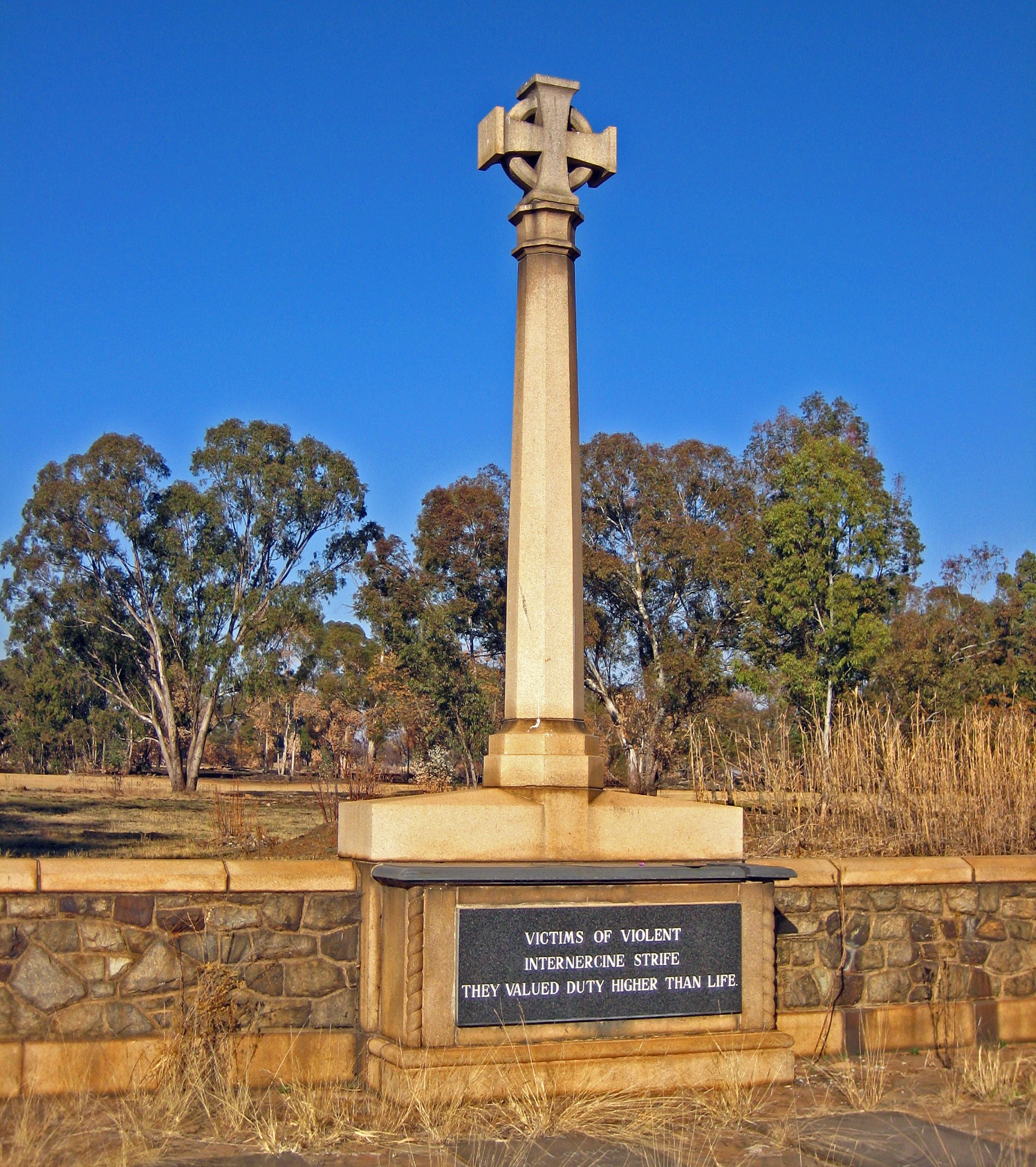
Monument to 1922 miners' strike in Brakpan

Alexander Kok was born on Valentine's Day, 1926, in the mining town of Brakpan near Johannesburg in South Africa, to parents of humble Boer farming stock. Both parents were accomplished musically: his father, Schalk Willem Kok, had a fine baritone voice and his mother, Johanna Petronella Vorster, was adept on the violin and piano, accompanying silent films at the local cinema. Married in 1919, the couple had four sons: D'Almero [Darrell] (1920), Felix (1922), Alexander [Bobby] (1926) and Myron (1932). Schalck was a farmer-turned-miner, but lost his job during the 1922 miners' strike, resulting in his wife becoming the main provider. In the 1930s she secured loans to purchase three plots in the affluent Johannesburg suburb of Saxonwold, after which her husband and family members constructed three houses for resale. Still working on mines in Northern Rhodesia, Schalk died in 1939 at the onset of the Second World War; while his wife and four sons emigrated to England in 1938.

== Musical career ==
After the family emigrated to England in 1938, Kok attended Haberdashers' Boys' School, displaying his prowess in rugby and boxing, before winning a scholarship in cello at the Royal Academy of Music in London, following in the same steps as his violinist brother Felix. The three eldest brothers performed as a piano trio, broadcast by the BBC World Service in Bush House. (Note: The eldest brother, Darrell, having been granted special permission as a 15-year-old to study medicine at the University of Witwatersrand, continued his clinical training at St Bartholomew's Hospital, already qualifying as a doctor in 1942. For his national service in 1946–1948, he was attached to the Royal Army Medical Corps, where his duties included conducting autopsies for evidence during the Nuremberg trials.) Wartime classical music activities of ENSA were organised by Walter Legge, overseen by Basil Dean and Leslie Henson; as part of the war effort, both Kok and his violinist brother played in the Boyd Neel Orchestra. Both became founder members of the Philharmonia Orchestra, set up by Legge in 1945. With no fixed concert hall or principal conductor, the orchestra performed and were recorded with well-known soloists (such as Dennis Brain and Kirsten Flagstad), under an assortment of guest conductors, including Sir Thomas Beecham, Richard Strauss, Wilhelm Furtwängler, Arturo Toscanini, Herbert von Karajan and Otto Klemperer. Kok continued to study cello under Pierre Fournier in Paris and Pablo Casals in Prades, France. Between 1960 and 1965, he was appointed as principal cellist of the BBC Symphony Orchestra. As well as orchestral performances, Kok also played chamber music in the Beaufort Trio, with Felix and the pianist Daphne Ibbott – broadcast live on the BBC Third Programme; and, when starting to teach music history at Dartington Hall in Devon in 1957, one year later he founded the Dartington String Quartet, with Colin Sauer, Peter Carter (violins) and Keith Lovell (viola). Kok was also a member of the London Octet and the London Ensemble. His debut as a solo performer was in 1960 at the Wigmore Hall, with one reviewer writing that his "tone was of a very appealing, mellow quality, and his musicianship was sensitively sympathetic and sincere”.

Moving later into commercial music, Kok became successful financially as a session musician in Britain, supplying backing music for well-known pop groups, as well as in the film, television and advertising world. His film credits include William Walton's incidental music for Olivier's trilogy Henry V, Hamlet and Richard III, as well as The Desert Rats, Lawrence of Arabia, Battle of Britain, Monty Python's Life of Brian and Time Bandits. For television he was involved in Geoffrey Burgon's incidental music for the BBC series Brideshead Revisited and numerous other programmes. As a backing musician, he recorded with many pop music stars, including Tony Bennett, Eric Clapton, Elton John and notably The Beatles – he was a particular favourite of their producer George Martin. He played cello on some of The Beatles' biggest hits, including "Hey Jude"; later he featured as cello solo in the 1987 George Harrison album Cloud Nine.

After setting up a music school in Cheltenham, he eventually settled to retire in Normandy: but not without mishap – two of his valuable cellos were accidentally destroyed in a fire in Gloucestershire. He married three times (in 1954, 1964 and 1981), each time ending in divorce. During his latter years in Normandy, Kok was cared for by his friend Margaret Cook. After her death in 2013, he returned to England. He died in 2015 at the age of 89 at Brinsworth House, Twickenham; the funeral took place at Mortlake Crematorium, Kew.

== Selected writings ==
- Kok, Alexander (2003). A Voice in the Dark: The Philharmonia Years. Emerson Edition. ISBN 0950620963.
- Kok, Alexander (2008). Not Particularly Attractive People?. comfybadger. ISBN 978-0956853301.

== See also ==
- List of people who performed on Beatles recordings
