= Salomon Kok =

Belgian diamond dealer

Sallie or Salomon Kok was a 20th-century Antwerp diamond dealer of Jewish-Dutch descent, who played a role in the Flemish Movement.

Politically, he was rather to the left. Kok became an important investor to the Flemish activists. Activist publications were financed by him. Not only he supported Leo Picard's Vlaamsche Post, spokesman for the radical activists, but in 1917 he was also one of the sponsors of a delegation of socialist activists to the international socialist peace conference in Stockholm. Like Marten Rudelsheim, he was involved in the Antwerp section of Volksopbeuring (popular relief, 1915), which supported impoverished Flemings. Kok fought for Flanders as well as for a Jewish state.
