= Vilmos Huszár =

Hungarian painter and designer (1884–1960)

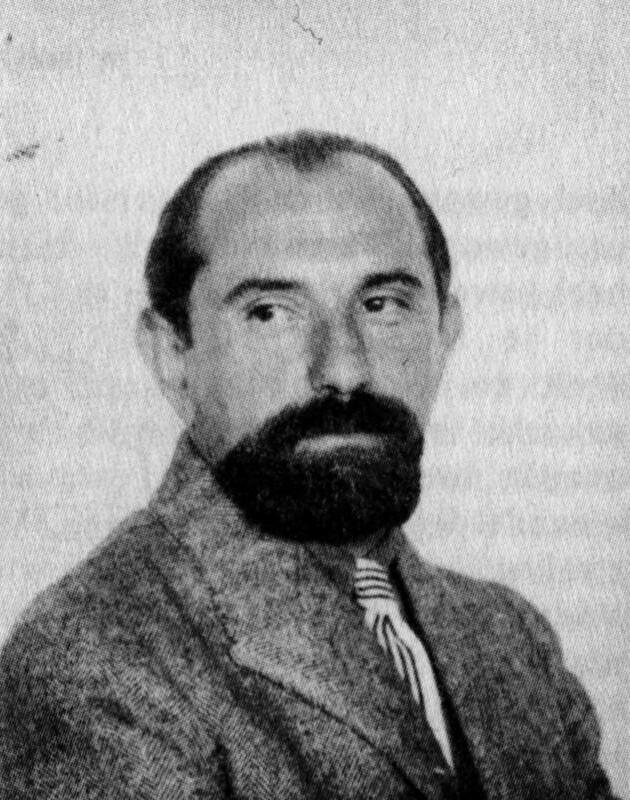
- Born: Vilmos Herz; January 5, 1884; Budapest, Kingdom of Hungary
- Died: September 8, 1960 (aged 76); Hierden, Netherlands

Mechano-Dancer, 1922, Private collection, New York

Vilmos Huszár (5 January 1884 – 8 September 1960) was a Hungarian painter and designer. He lived in The Netherlands, where he was one of the founding members of the art movement De Stijl.

Huszár was born in Budapest, Hungary. He emigrated to The Netherlands in 1905, settling at first in Voorburg. He was influenced by Cubism and Futurism. He met other influential artists including Piet Mondrian and Theo van Doesburg, both central figures in establishing the De Stijl movement with Huszár in 1917. Huszár also co-founded the De Stijl magazine and designed the cover for the first issue.

In 1918, he devised an interior colour scheme for the boys' bedroom, designed with Piet Klaarhamer, in Cornelis Bruynzeel sr.'s house in Voorburg. From 1920 to 1921 he collaborated with Piet Zwart on furniture designs. He left the De Stijl group in 1923. He collaborated with Gerrit Rietveld on an exhibition interior for the Greater Berlin Art Exhibition. From 1925, Huszár concentrated on graphic design and painting.

Packaging design, 1926, Cooper-Hewitt, National Design Museum, New York

In 1926 he created a complete visual identity for Miss Blanche Virginia cigarettes, which included packaging, advertising, and point of sale displays. The concept drew on the imagery associated with the emergent "New Women", or Flappers. The Flappers were perceived as young, single, urban, and employed, with independent ideas and a certain disdain for authority and social norms. The smoking of cigarettes was closely associated with their newfound independence.

Huszár's work was included in the 1939 exhibition and sale Onze Kunst van Heden (Our Art of Today) at the Rijksmuseum in Amsterdam.

The whereabouts of many of Huszár's works are unknown. Many of his paintings and sculptures are only known through photographs that appeared in De Stijl, or from photographs taken by the artist himself. Works that are lost include the Dancing mechanical doll, a device that could adopt several different postures and was used during Dada conferences in the early 1920s.

Huszár died in the Dutch town Harderwijk in 1960.

From 8 March to 19 May 1985 a large Huszár retrospective was held at the Gemeentemuseum in The Hague.

In 2021, a sculpture titled Dutch De Stijl Woman was discovered on eBay by a Hungarian collector who bought it for 95 euros. The finding sparked skepticism among experts on Huszár's body of work, as there were no prior records of sculptures of his. Based on new evidence, art historian Gergely Barki has suggested that the artwork might be a collaborative effort between Huszár and Chris Lanooy, a dutch ceramist. The art first have been displayed on a Parisian "Lost and Found" exhibition.
