= De Stijl =

Dutch art movement founded 1917

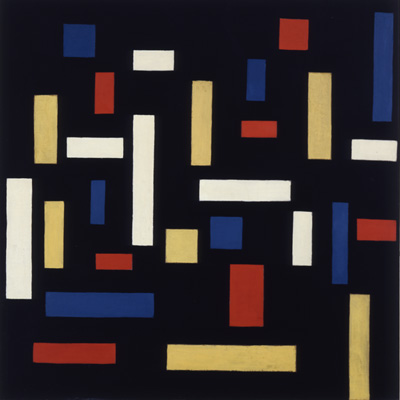
- Theo van Doesburg, Composition VII (the three graces), 1917

Additional media
- Years active: 1917–1931
- Location: Netherlands
- Major figures: Theo van Doesburg, Piet Mondrian, Gerrit Rietveld, J.J.P. Oud, Bart van der Leck
- Influences: Cubism; Modernism
- Influenced: Bauhaus; Abstract art; Minimalism; Constructivism

De Stijl (/də ˈstaɪl/, Dutch: [də ˈstɛil]; 'The Style') was a Dutch art movement founded in 1917 by a group of artists and architects based in Leiden (Theo van Doesburg, J. J. P. Oud), Voorburg (Vilmos Huszár, Jan Wils) and Laren (Piet Mondrian, Bart van der Leck).

De Stijl was also the name of a journal – published by the Dutch painter, designer, writer, poet and critic Theo van Doesburg – that propagated the group's theories. Along with van Doesburg, the group's principal members were the painters Piet Mondrian, Vilmos Huszár, Bart van der Leck, the architects J.J.P. Oud, Jan Wils, Gerrit Rietveld, Robert van 't Hoff, the sculptor and painter Georges Vantongerloo, and the poet and writer Antony Kok.

The art theory that formed the basis for the group's work was originally known as Nieuwe Beelding in Dutch; it was later translated to Neoplasticism in English. This theory was subsequently extended to encompass the principles of Elementarism.

== Principles and influences ==
Mondrian set forth the principles of neoplasticism in his essay "Neo-Plasticism in Pictorial Art". He wrote, "this new plastic idea will ignore the particulars of appearance, that is to say, natural form and colour. On the contrary, it should find its expression in the abstraction of form and colour, that is to say, in the straight line and the clearly defined primary colour". With these constraints, his art allowed only primary colours and non-colours, only squares and rectangles, only straight and horizontal or vertical lines. The De Stijl movement initially adopted Mondrian's principles until around 1924 when it rejected some of them and adopted those of Elementarism, which included the use of dynamic diagonal lines, allowing colour to infuse more energy into a work, and the rejection of harmonious and balanced relationships.

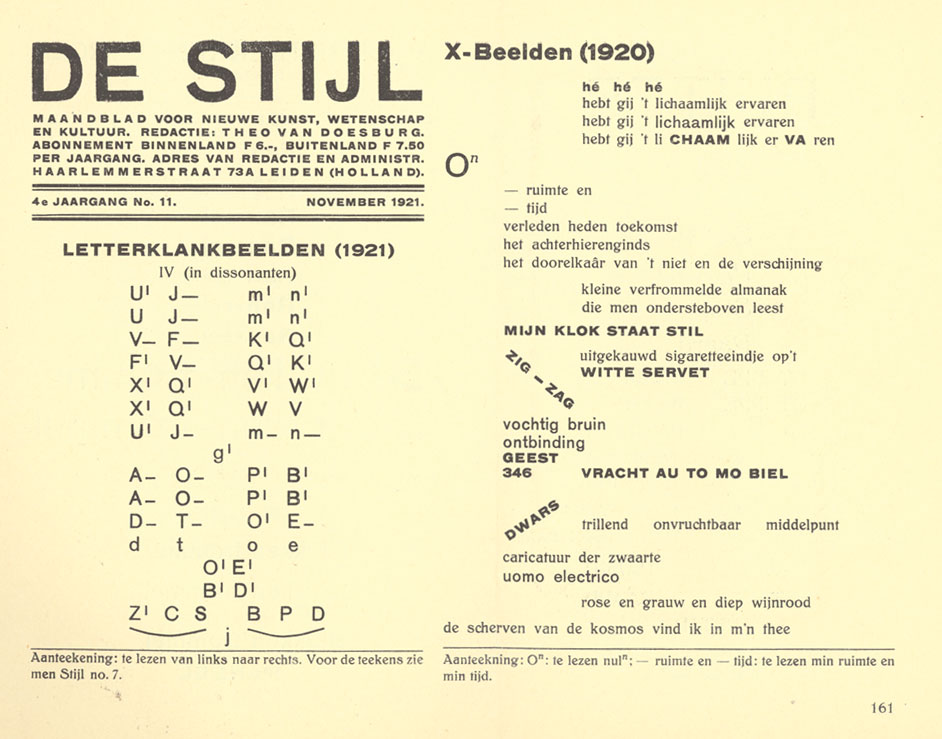
De Stijl November 1921, Dadaism

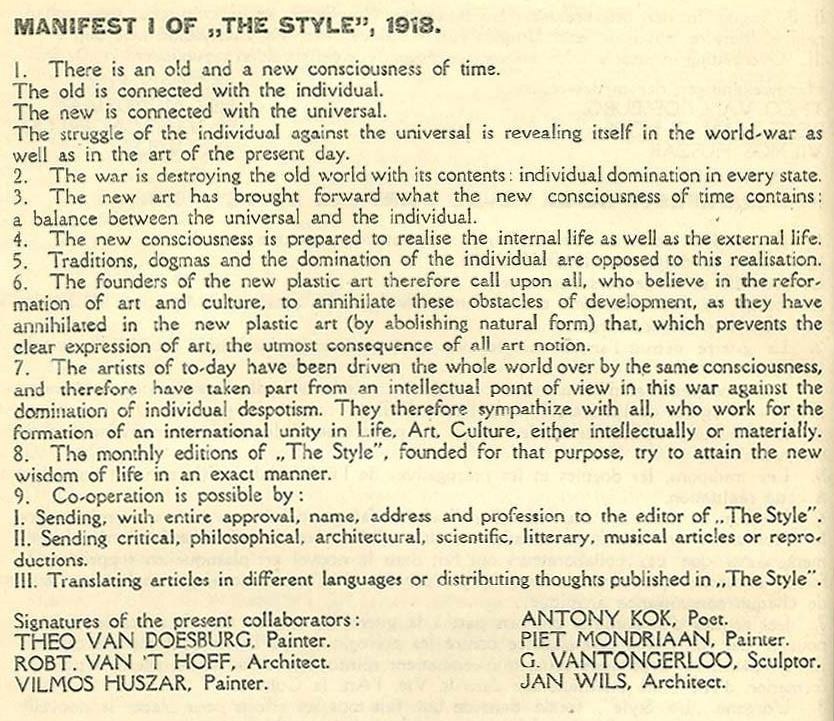
De Stijl Manifesto I, November 1918

The name De Stijl is supposedly derived from Gottfried Semper's Der Stil in den technischen und tektonischen Künsten oder Praktische Ästhetik (1861–1863), which Curl suggests was mistakenly believed to advocate materialism and functionalism.

Nieuwe beelding [new vision], or neoplasticism, saw itself as reaching beyond the changing appearance of natural things to bring an audience into intimate contact with an immutable core of reality, a reality that was not so much a visible fact as an underlying spiritual vision. Initially, De Stijl proposed this ultimate simplicity and abstraction, both in architecture and painting, by using only straight horizontal and vertical lines and rectangular forms. Its vocabulary was limited to the primary colours, red, yellow, and blue, and the three primary values, black, white, and grey. The works avoided symmetry and attained aesthetic balance by the use of opposition. This element of the tension embodied the second meaning of stijl: 'a post, jamb or support'; this is best exemplified by the construction of crossing joints, most commonly seen in carpentry.

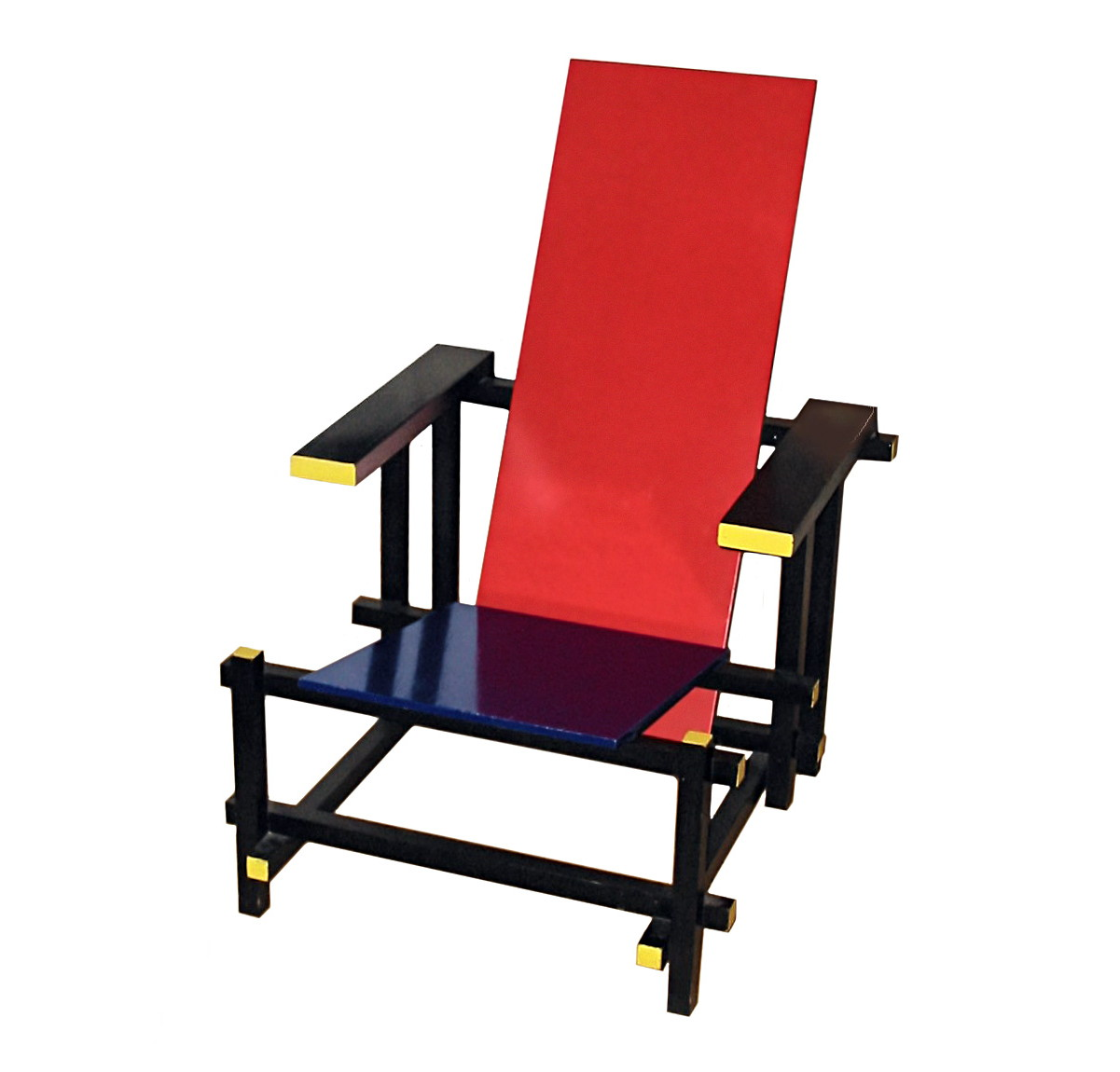
Red and Blue Chair, designed by Gerrit Rietveld, version without colors 1919, version with colors 1923

In many of the group's three-dimensional works, vertical and horizontal lines are positioned in layers or planes that do not intersect, thereby allowing each element to exist independently and unobstructed by other elements. This feature can be found in the Rietveld Schröder House and the Red and Blue Chair.

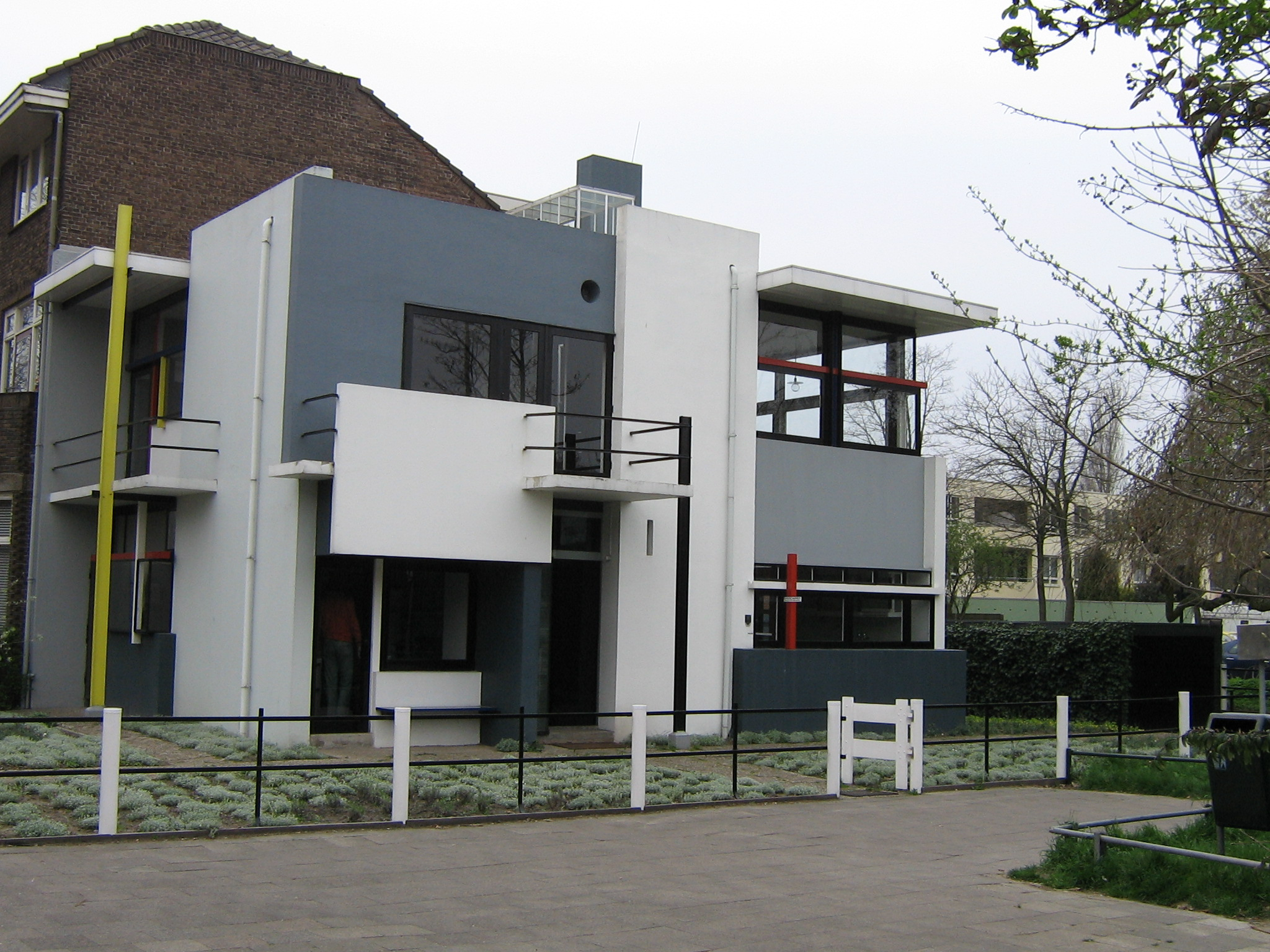
The Rietveld Schröder House in Utrecht, 1924 – the only building realised completely according to the principles of De Stijl.

De Stijl was influenced by Cubist painting as well as by the mysticism and the ideas about "ideal" geometric forms (such as the "perfect straight line") in the neoplatonic philosophy of M. H. J. Schoenmaekers. The De Stijl movement was also influenced by Neopositivism. The works of De Stijl would influence the Bauhaus style and the international style of architecture as well as clothing and interior design. However, it did not follow the general guidelines of an "-ism" (e.g., Cubism, Futurism, Surrealism), nor did it adhere to the principles of art schools like the Bauhaus; it was a collective project, a joint enterprise that changed over time, resulting in new "elementary design" principles which Van Doesburg called Elementarism.

In music, De Stijl was an influence only on the work of composer Jakob van Domselaer, a close friend of Mondrian. Between 1913 and 1916, he composed his Proeven van Stijlkunst ("Experiments in Artistic Style"), inspired mainly by Mondrian's paintings. This minimalistic—and, at the time, revolutionary—music defined "horizontal" and "vertical" musical elements and aimed at balancing those two principles. Van Domselaer was relatively unknown in his lifetime, and did not play a significant role within De Stijl.

== History ==
=== Early history ===
From the flurry of new art movements that followed the Impressionist revolutionary new perception of painting, Cubism arose in the early 20th century as an important and influential new direction. In the Netherlands, too, there was interest in this "new art". However, because the Netherlands remained neutral in World War I, Dutch artists were not able to leave the country after 1914 and were thus effectively isolated from the international art world—and in particular, from Paris, which was its centre at that time.

During that period, Theo van Doesburg started looking for other artists to set up a journal and start an art movement. Van Doesburg was also a writer, poet, and critic, who had been more successful writing about art than working as an independent artist. Quite adept at making new contacts due to his flamboyant personality and outgoing nature, he had many useful connections in the art world.

=== Founding of De Stijl ===
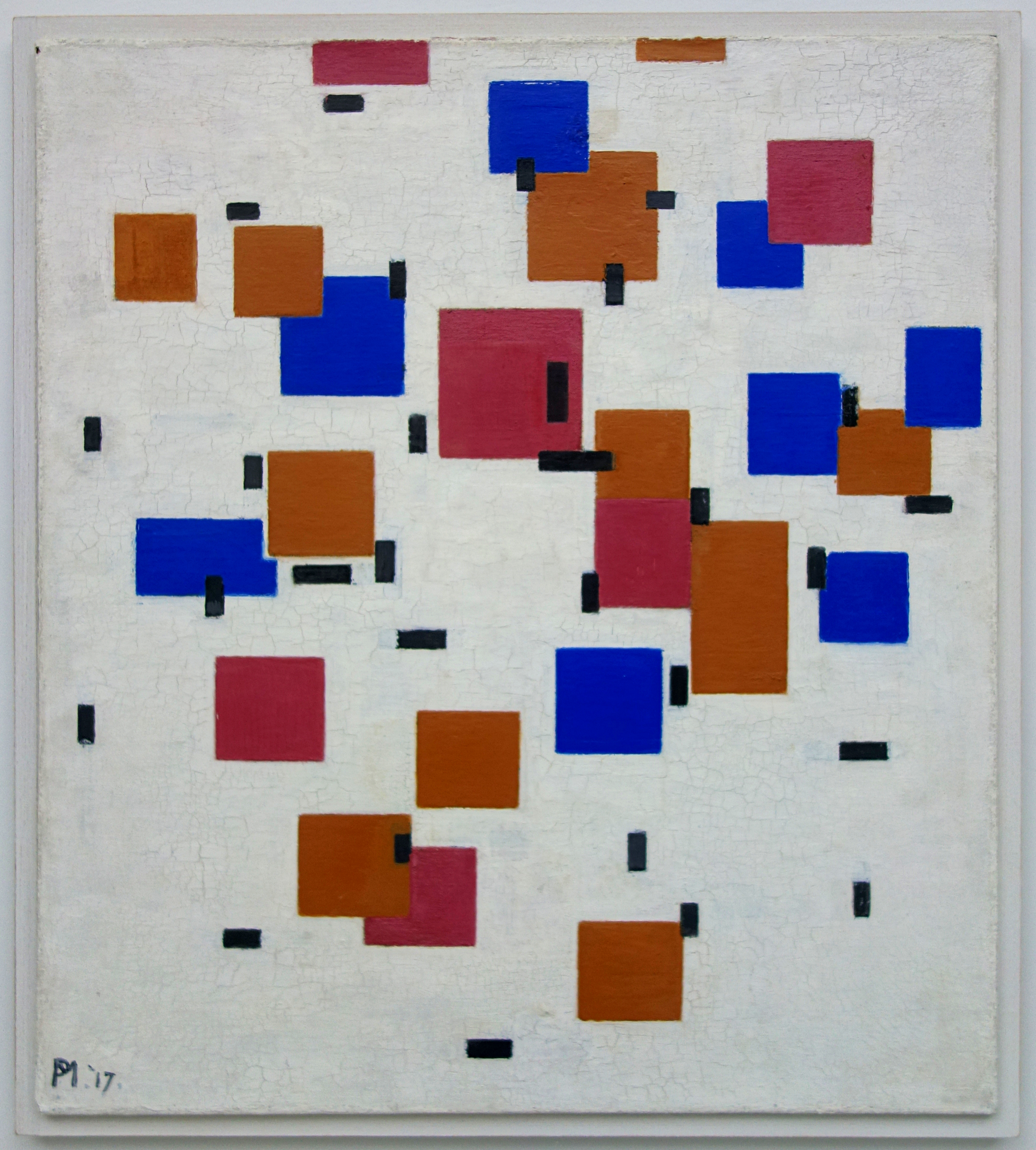
Piet Mondrian, Composition en couleur A, 1917, Kröller-Müller Museum

Around 1915, Van Doesburg started meeting the artists who would eventually become the founders of the journal. He first met Piet Mondrian at an exhibition in Stedelijk Museum Amsterdam. Mondrian, who had moved to Paris in 1912 (and there, changed his name from "Mondriaan"), had been visiting the Netherlands when war broke out, and so could not return to Paris. Mondrian stayed in the artists' community of Laren, where he met Bart van der Leck and regularly saw M. H. J. Schoenmaekers. In 1915, Schoenmaekers published Het nieuwe wereldbeeld ("The New Worldview"), followed in 1916 by Beginselen der beeldende wiskunde ("Principles of Formative Mathematics"). These two publications would greatly influence Mondrian and other members of De Stijl.

Van Doesburg also knew J. J. P. Oud and the Hungarian artist Vilmos Huszár. In 1917 the cooperation of these artists, together with his friend the poet and musician Antony Kok, resulted in the founding of De Stijl. The young architect Gerrit Rietveld joined the group in 1918. At its height De Stijl had 100 members and the journal had a circulation of 300.

During those first few years, the group was still relatively homogeneous, although Van der Leck left in 1918 due to artistic differences of opinion. Manifestos were being published, signed by all members. The social and economic circumstances of the time formed an important source of inspiration for their theories, and their ideas about architecture were heavily influenced by Hendrik Petrus Berlage and Frank Lloyd Wright.

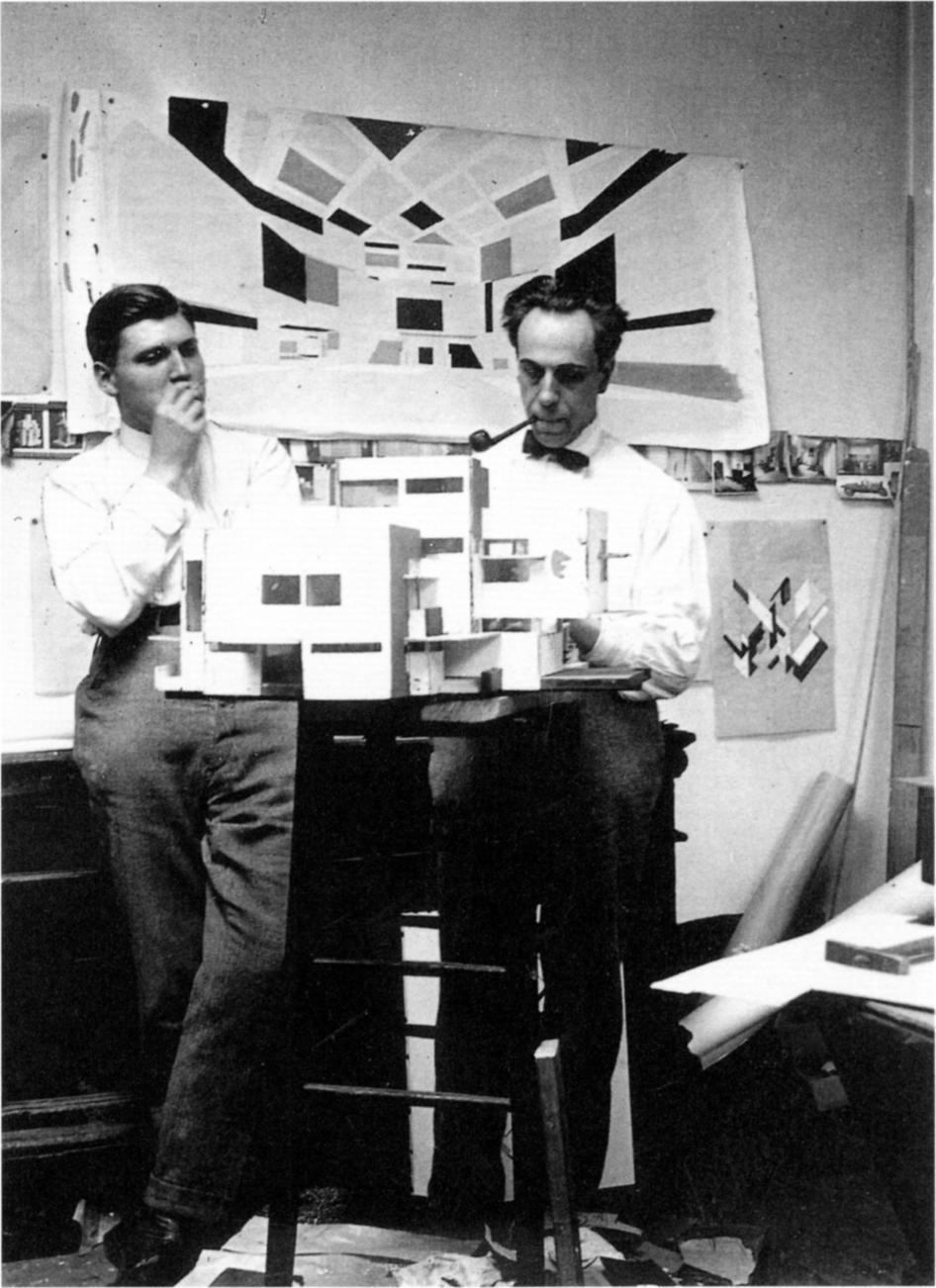
Theo van Doesburg (r) and Cornelis van Eesteren (l) in their studio in Paris, 1923

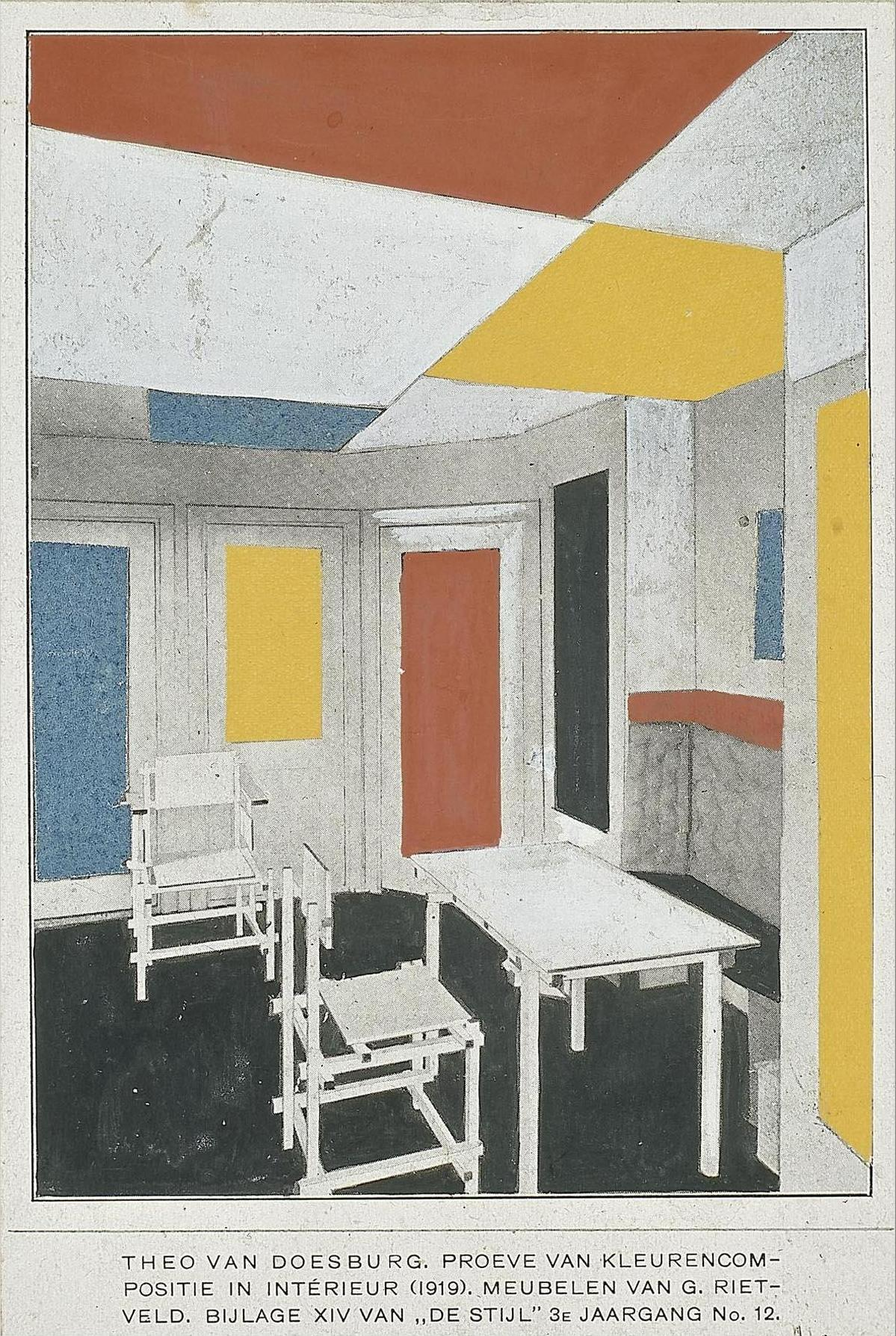
Van Doesburg and Rietveld interior, c.1919, Rijksmuseum, Amsterdam

The name Nieuwe Beelding was a term first coined in 1917 by Mondrian, who wrote a series of twelve articles called De Nieuwe Beelding in de schilderkunst ("Neo-Plasticism in Painting") that were published in the journal De Stijl. In 1920 he published a book titled Le Néo-Plasticisme.

=== After 1920 ===
Around 1921, the group's character started to change. From the time of van Doesburg's association with Bauhaus, other influences started playing a role. These influences were mainly Malevich and Russian Constructivism, to which not all members agreed. In 1924 Mondrian broke with the group after van Doesburg proposed the theory of Elementarism, suggesting that a diagonal line is more vital than horizontal and vertical ones. In addition, the De Stijl group acquired many new "members". Among the last to join was the painter César Domela, who met Mondrian and van Doesburg in Paris in 1924 and became the group's youngest member. Dadaist influences, such as I. K. Bonset's poetry and Aldo Camini's "antiphilosophy" generated controversy as well. Only after Van Doesburg's death was it revealed that Bonset and Camini were two of his pseudonyms.

The group was a pivotal element of the interwar avant-garde network. It maintained close links with various modern artists, including representatives of the Polish avant-garde, and since 1925 Warsaw was also listed as one of De Stijl’s cities on the cover of this magazine alongside Leiden, Hannover, Paris, Brno and Vienna.

=== After van Doesburg's death ===
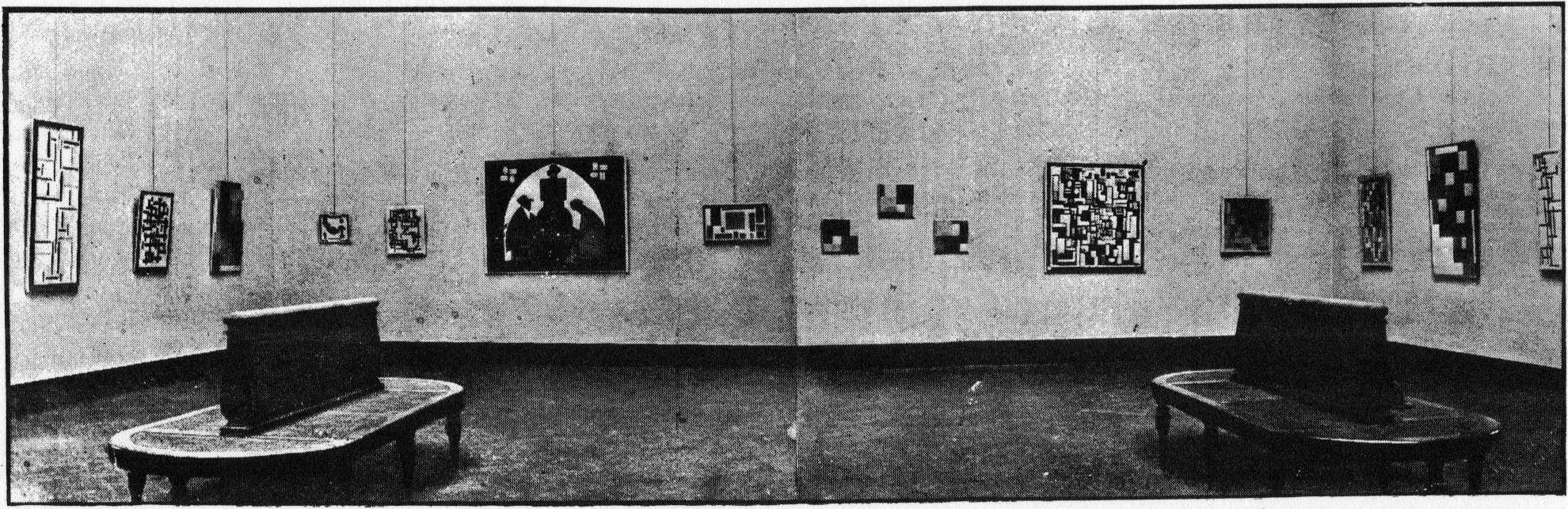
Theo van Doesburg, activities in Weimar (outside the Bauhaus Weimar 1919–1925). Private courses, introduction of the Cubist architecture of "De Stijl", 1921–1922. Retrospective in Landesmuseum Weimar, 16 December 1923 – 23 January 1924

Theo van Doesburg died in Davos, Switzerland, in 1931. His wife, Nelly, administered his estate. Because of van Doesburg's pivotal role within De Stijl, the group did not survive. Individual members remained in contact, but De Stijl could not exist without a strong central character. Thus, it may be wrong to think of De Stijl as a close-knit group of artists. The members knew each other, but most communication took place by letter. For example, Mondrian and Rietveld never met in person.

Many, though not all, artists did stay true to the movement's basic ideas, even after 1931. Rietveld, for instance, continued designing furniture according to De Stijl principles, while Mondrian continued working in the style he had initiated around 1917. Van der Leck, on the other hand, went back to figurative compositions after his departure from the group.

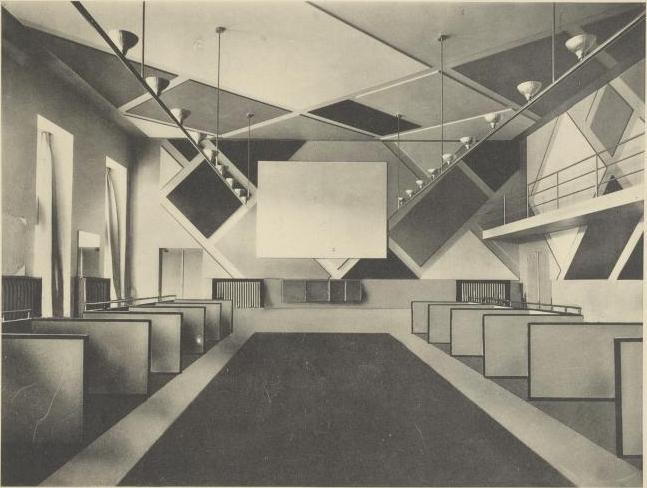
Aubette dance hall in Strasbourg, Theo van Doesburg in collaboration with Sophie Taeuber-Arp and Jean Arp, 1929

=== Influence on architecture ===
The De Stijl influence on architecture remained considerable long after its inception; Mies van der Rohe was among the most important proponents of its ideas. Between 1923 and 1924, Rietveld designed the Rietveld Schröder House, the only building to have been created completely according to De Stijl principles. Examples of Stijl-influenced works by J.J.P. Oud can be found in Rotterdam (the Café De Unie) and Hook of Holland (Arbeiderswoningen). Other examples include the Eames House by Charles and Ray Eames, and the interior decoration for the Aubette dance hall in Strasbourg, designed by Sophie Taeuber-Arp, Jean Arp and van Doesburg.

=== Present day ===
Works by De Stijl members are scattered all over the world, but De Stijl-themed exhibitions are organised regularly. Museums with large De Stijl collections include the Kunstmuseum in The Hague (which owns the world's most extensive, although not exclusively De Stijl-related, Mondrian collection) and Amsterdam's Stedelijk Museum, where many works by Rietveld and Van Doesburg are on display. The Centraal Museum of Utrecht has the largest Rietveld collection worldwide; it also owns the Rietveld Schröder House, Rietveld's adjacent "show house", and the Rietveld Schröder Archives.

The movement inspired the design aesthetics of Rumyantsevo and Salaryevo stations of Moscow Metro opened in 2016.

== Neoplasticists ==
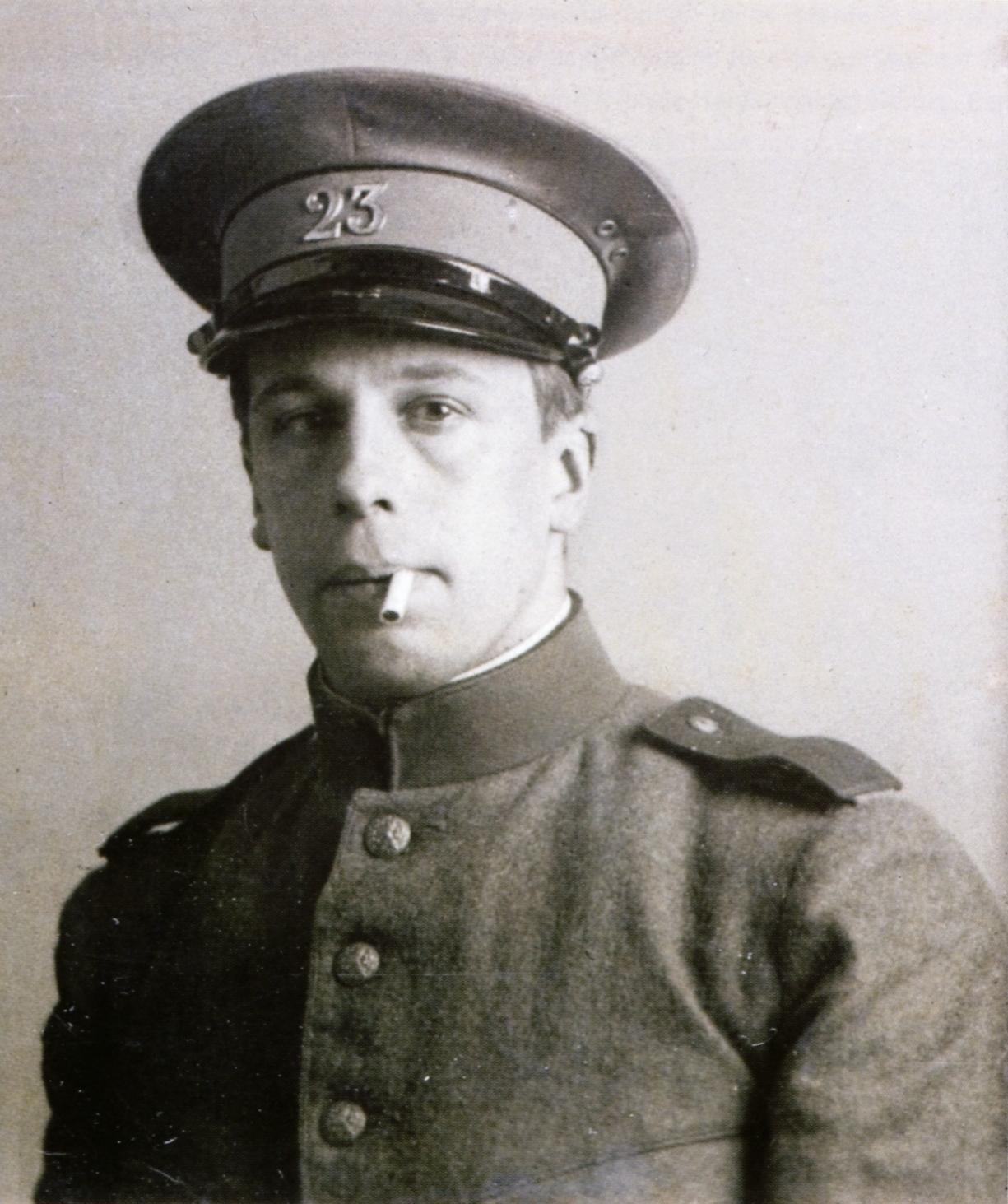
Theo van Doesburg

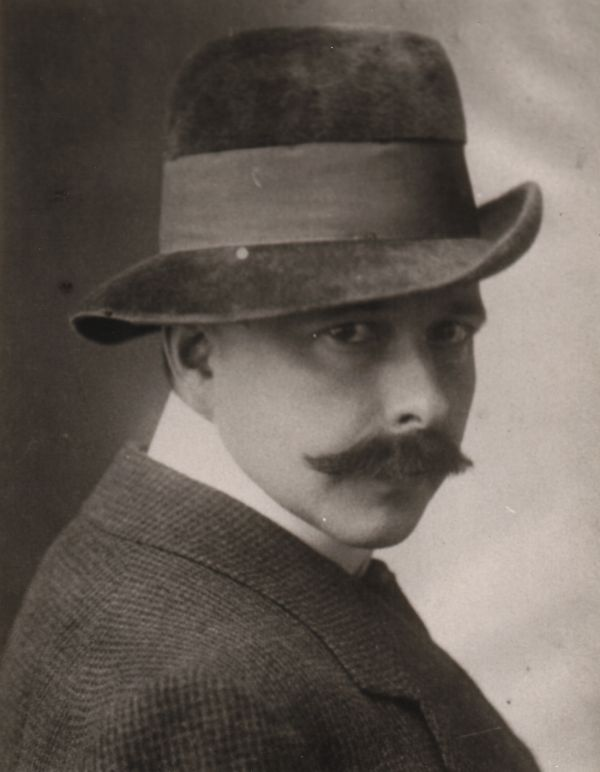
Antony Kok

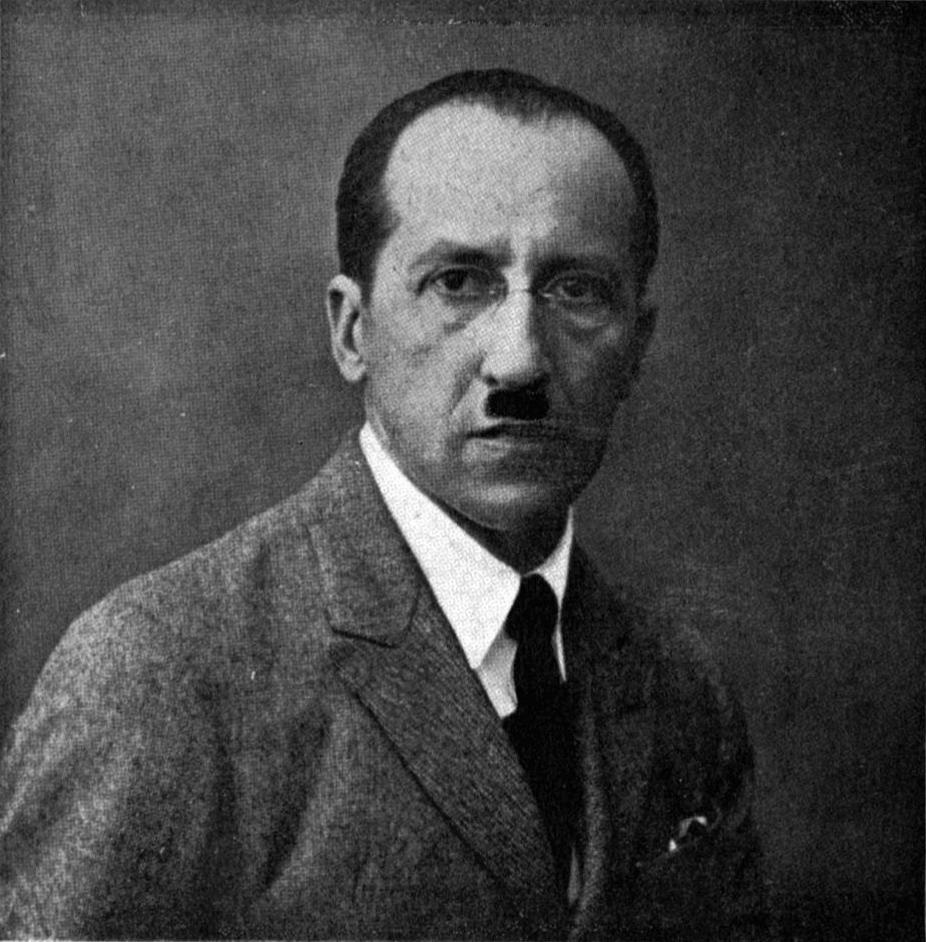
Piet Mondrian

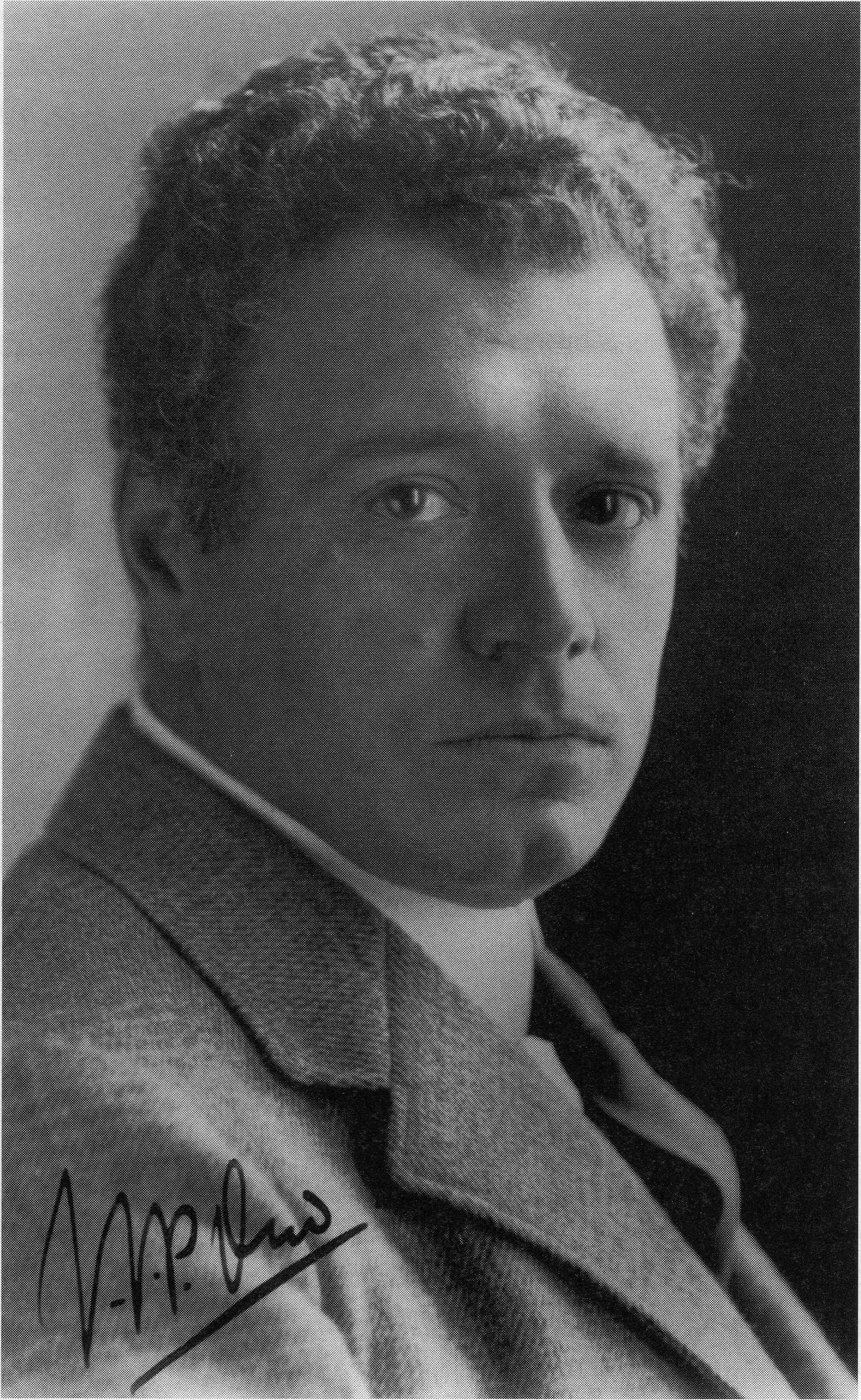
J.J.P. Oud

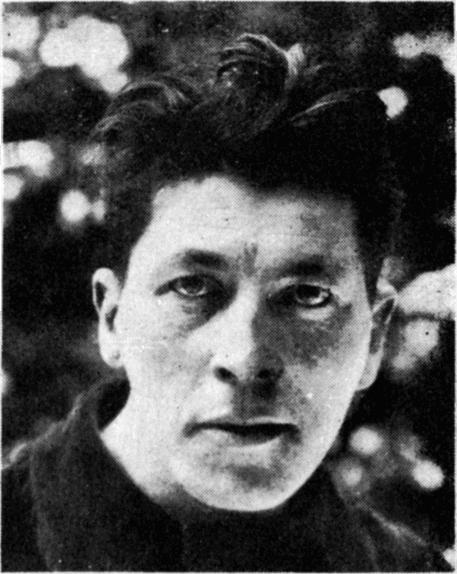
Gerrit Rietveld

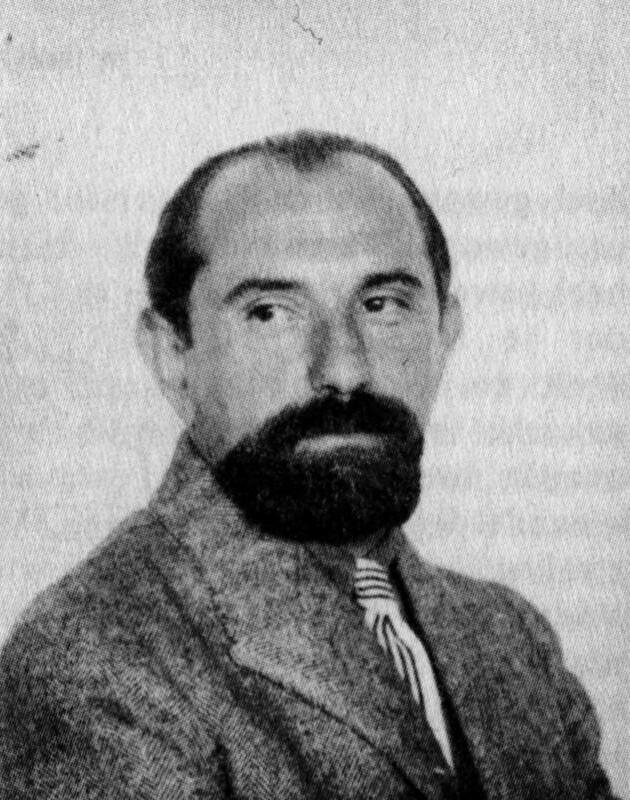
Vilmos Huszár

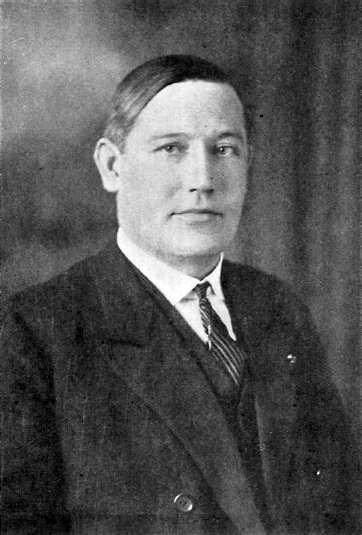
Jan Wils
- Ilya Bolotowsky (1907–1981), painter and sculptor
- Burgoyne Diller (1906–1965), painter
- Theo van Doesburg (1883–1931), painter, designer, poet and writer; co-founder of De Stijl; editor of De Stijl, 1917–1931
- César Domela (1900–1992), painter and sculptor
- Cornelis van Eesteren (1897–1981), architect
- Jean Gorin (1899–1981), painter, sculptor
- Robert van 't Hoff (1887–1979), architect
- Vilmos Huszár (1884–1960), painter
- Frederick John Kiesler (1890–1965), architect, theater designer, artist, sculptor
- Antony Kok (1882–1969), poet and writer
- Bart van der Leck (1876–1958), painter
- Piet Mondrian (1872–1944), painter, co-founder of De Stijl
- Marlow Moss (1889–1958), painter
- J. J. P. Oud (1890–1963), architect
- Gerrit Rietveld (1888–1964), architect and designer
- Kurt Schwitters (1887–1948), painter, sculptor
- Georges Vantongerloo (1886–1965), sculptor
- Friedrich Vordemberge-Gildewart (1899–1962), painter
- Jan Wils (1891–1972), architect

== See also ==
- Art Concret – French-language art magazine (1930)
- Abstraction-Création – Association of artists (Paris, 1931)
- Concrete art – Art movement emphasizing geometrical abstraction
- Elementarism – Modernist art theory
- Form follows function – Design philosophy of 19th–20th centuries
- Fourth dimension in art – Attempt to demonstrate the 4th dimension in visual arts
- Mathematics and art
- Modern architecture – 20th-century movement and style
