= Jan Kok (pharmacist) =

Dutch pharmacist

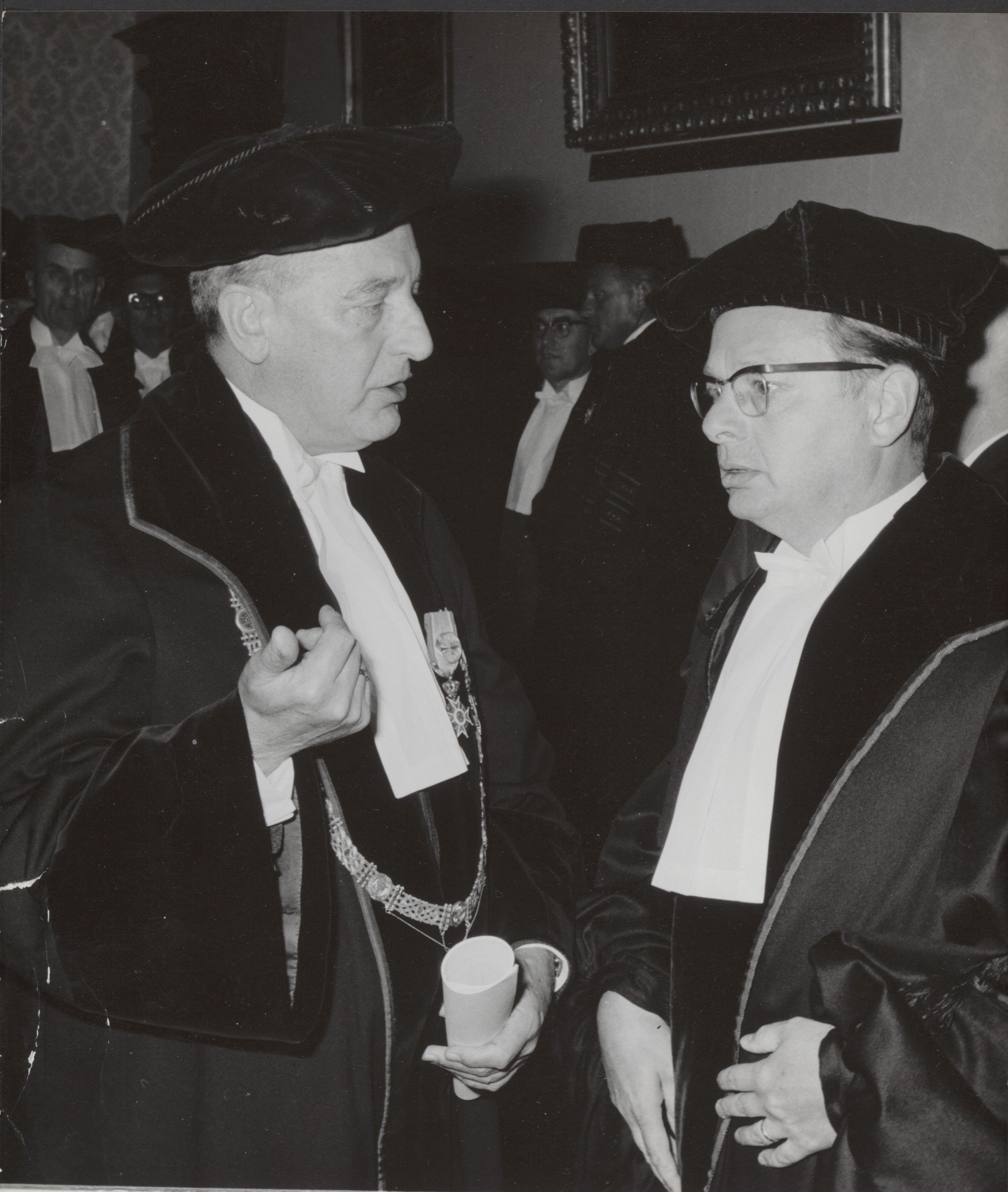
Prof. Jan Kok (left) and Prof. Jo van der Hoeven who accepted the position of Rector Magnificus this afternoon Date September 21, 1964

Jan Kok (13 June 1899, Amsterdam - 7 September 1982, Egmond aan Zee) was a Dutch pharmacist. In 1945, he was appointed as professor at the University of Amsterdam, and between 1960 and 1964 he was rector magnificus of this university.
