= Architype van der Leck =

Geometric sans-serif typeface

- Category: Sans-serif
- Classification: Geometric
- Designers: Freda Sack; David Quay; Bart van der Leck
- Foundry: The Foundry
- Date created: 1941
- Date released: 1997

Architype van der Leck is a geometric sans-serif typeface, based upon the 1941 typeface designed by Bart van der Leck for the Dutch magazine Flax, a journal of the De Stijl art movement.

The face is geometrically constructed, and based upon an earlier stencil lettering alphabet van der Leck designed in the early 1930s for use in branding and advertising Jo de Leeuw's prestigious Dutch department stores Metz & Co. The face shares structural similarities with Theo van Doesburg's 1919 geometric alphabet, and anticipates later typographic explorations of geometric reductionism of Wim Crouwel's 1967 New Alphabet and early digital faces like Zuzana Licko's faces Lo-Res and Emperor 8. The Architype van der Leck typeface is part of a collection of several revivals of early twentieth century typographic experimentation designed by Freda Sack and David Quay of The Foundry.

== See also ==
- Architype Albers
- Architype Aubette
- Architype Bayer
- Architype Renner
- Architype Schwitters
- Architype Bill
- Architype Van Doesburg
- Architype Bayer Type
- Architype
- Architype Van Der Leck
- Architype Ballmer
- Architype Ulikernet
- Architype Tschichold
- Architype Catalogue Solid
- Architype Ingenieur
- Architype Ingenieur Dot
- Architype Fodor
- Architype Stedelijk
