= Architype Bayer =

Geometric sans-serif typeface

- Category: Sans-serif
- Classification: Geometric
- Designer(s): Freda Sack; David Quay; Herbert Bayer
- Foundry: The Foundry
- Date created: 1927
- Date released: 1997

Architype Bayer is a geometric sans-serif typeface based upon the 1927 experimentation of Herbert Bayer. Bayer reacted to the Germanic use of capitalization for all nouns by abandoning uppercase. His new case combined characters based on the Carolingian minuscule with uppercase K rescaled to top-align on the mean line. The Bayer Architype typeface is one of a collection of several revivals of early twentieth century typographic experimentation designed by Freda Sack and David Quay of The Foundry.

== See also ==
- Architype Albers
- Architype Renner
- Architype Schwitters
- Architype van der Leck
- Architype Van Doesburg
