= Architype Albers =

Geometric sans-serif typeface

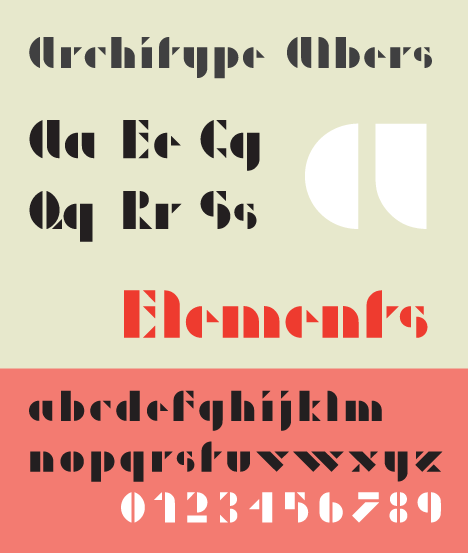
- Category: Sans-serif
- Classification: Geometric
- Designer(s): Freda Sack; David Quay; Josef Albers
- Foundry: The Foundry
- Date created: 1926–1931
- Date released: 1997

Architype Albers is a modular stencil sans-serif typeface based upon a series of experiments between 1926 and 1931 by Josef Albers (1888–1976), German designer, educator and typographer. The Architype Albers typeface is one of a collection of several revivals of early twentieth century typographic experimentation designed by Freda Sack and David Quay of The Foundry.

Albers studied art in Berlin, Essen, and Munich before enrolling as a student at the Bauhaus in Weimar in 1920. He began teaching in the preliminary course of the Department of Design in 1922, and was promoted to professor in 1925, the year the Bauhaus moved to Dessau. He taught there until the school was closed by the Nazis in 1933.

Albers designed a series of stencil faces while teaching at the Dessau Bauhaus. The typeface is based on a limited palette of geometric forms combined in a size ratio of 1:3. Drawn on a grid, the elements of square, triangle, and circle combine to form letters with an economy of form. Never intended for text, the face was designed for use on posters and in large-scale signs.

== See also ==
- Architype Aubette
- Architype Bayer
- Architype Renner
- Architype Schwitters
- Architype Van Doesburg
- Architype van der Leck
