= Bart van der Leck =

Dutch painter (1876–1958)

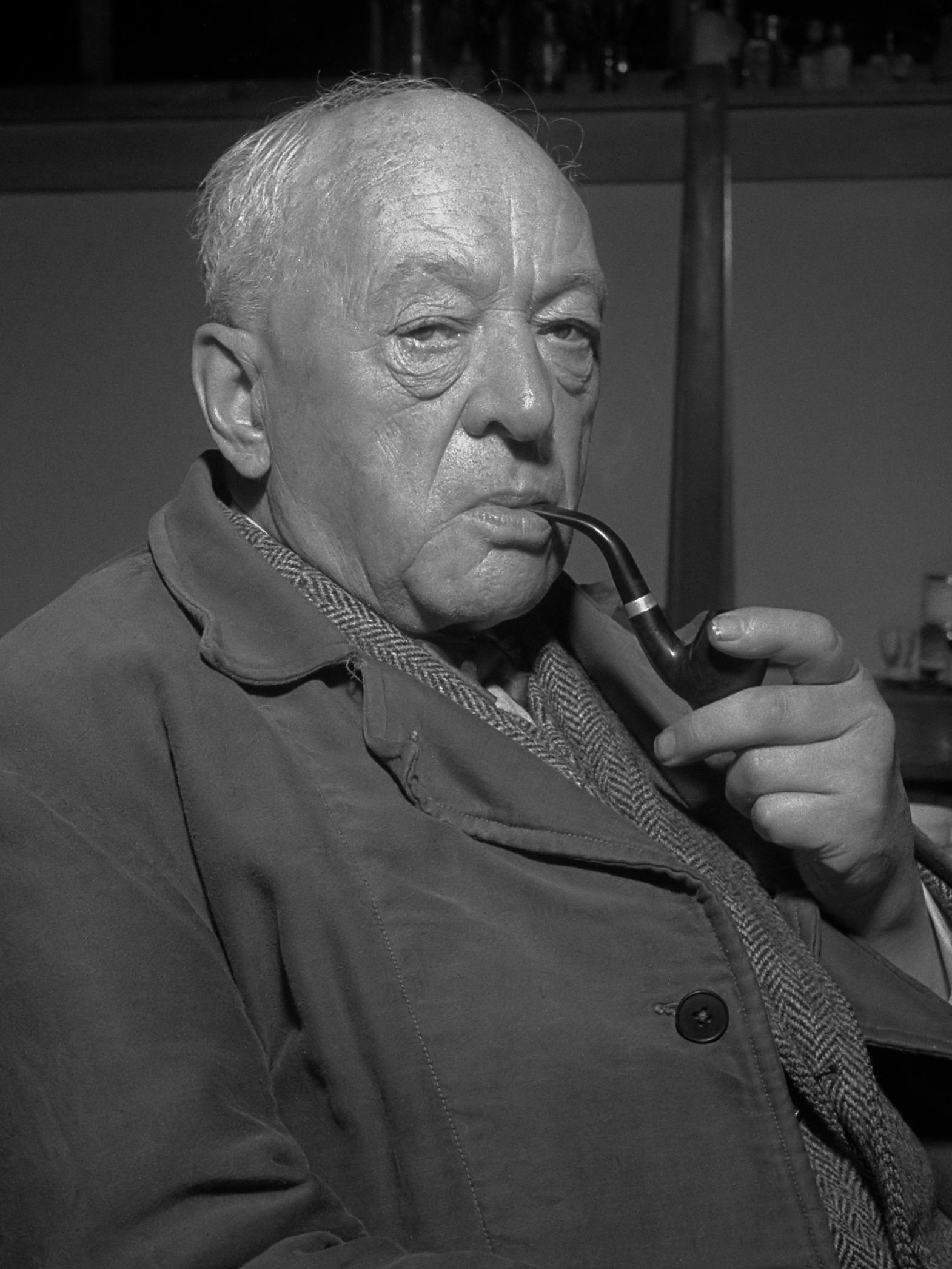
Van der Leck in 1956

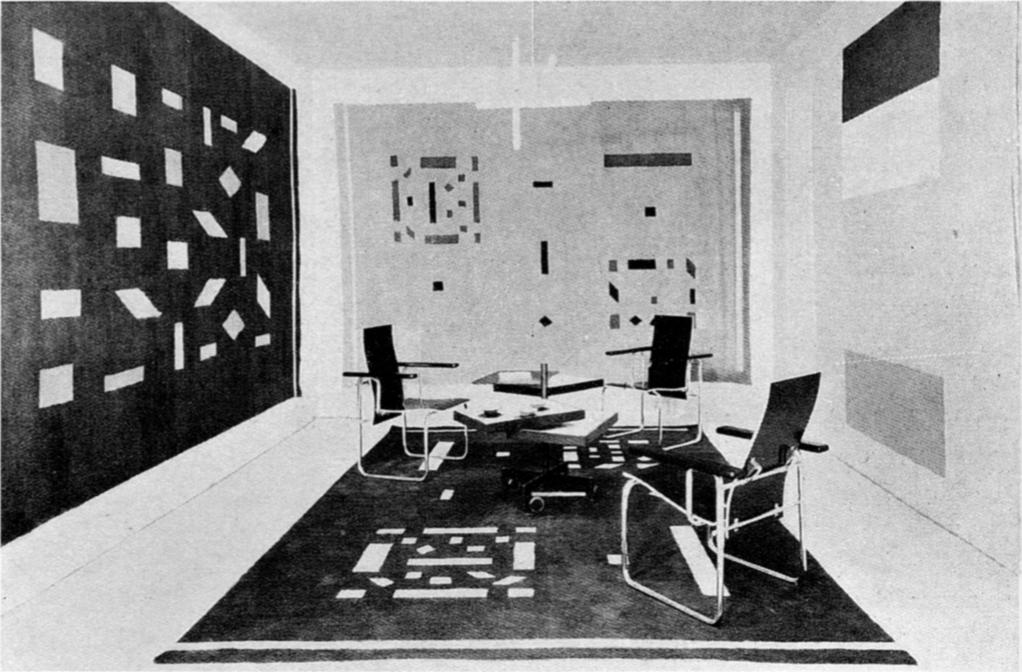
Metz & Co. showroom with wall hangings (left and rear walls) and carpet by Bart van der Leck, and furniture by Gerrit Rietveld

Bart van der Leck (26 November 1876 – 13 November 1958) was a Dutch painter, designer, and ceramicist. With Theo van Doesburg and Piet Mondrian he founded the De Stijl art movement.

== Biography ==
Van der Leck was born on 26 November 1876, in Utrecht. Son of a house painter, he started his career learning how to make stained glass in a shop in Utrecht. An example of his later stained glass work is in the Kröller-Müller Museum.

After having met Mondrian and van Doesburg and having founded the Stijl movement with them, his style became completely abstract, as did Mondrian's. But after disagreements with Mondrian his abstract style became based on representational images. His painting Triptych is an example, in which he transformed sketches of a mine in Spain into seemingly abstract shapes.

In 1919-1920 he created the interior design for St Hubertus Hunting Lodge, in the Hoge Veluwe estate. The hunting lodge was designed by Hendrik Petrus Berlage. In 1930, he was commissioned by Jo de Leeuw, owner of the prestigious Dutch department store Metz & Co. to design interiors, window packaging, branding and advertising. For these print materials van der Leck developed a rectilinear, geometrically constructed alphabet. In 1941, he designed a typeface based on this alphabet for the avant garde magazine Flax. Architype van der Leck, a digital revival of that face by David Quary and Freda Sack of The Foundry, was released in 1994.

Bart van der Leck claimed to be the father of the avant-garde movement. In his own words he said: "Mondrian came to my place one day with Doesburg, whom I had never seen before. When Doesburg noticed an abstract painting right on the easel, he exclaimed: 'If that is to be the painting of the future, may I be hanged right now!' Well, a few months later, he was painting in precisely that manner. That's the sort of person Doesburg was. No ideas of his own. And a cheat in bargain... ."

Van der Leck died on 13 November 1958, in Blaricum.

== Public collections ==
Among the public collections holding works by the artist are:

- Museum de Fundatie, Zwolle, The Netherlands
- Kröller-Müller Museum

== Sources ==
- Blotkamp, Carel (1982). De Stijl: the formative years. The MIT Press.
- Blotkamp, Carel (1994). Mondrian: The Art of Destruction. Reaktion Books Ltd.
- Seuphor, Michael (1971). Piet Mondrian. New York, NY: Harry N. Abrams Inc. p. 138.
- Haley, Allen. Type: Hot Designers Make Cool Fonts. Rockport Publishers Inc, Gloucester; 1998. ISBN 1-56496-317-9
- Hoek, Els, Marleen Blokhuis, Ingrid Goovaerts, Natalie Kamphuys, et al. Theo van Doesburg: Oeuvre Catalogus. Centraal Museum: 2000. ISBN 90-6868-255-5.
- Toos van Kooten (ed.). Bart van der Leck. Rijksmuseum Kröller-Müller, Otterlo, 1994 (in Dutch).
