= Spetzgart Castle =

- Schloss Spetzgart
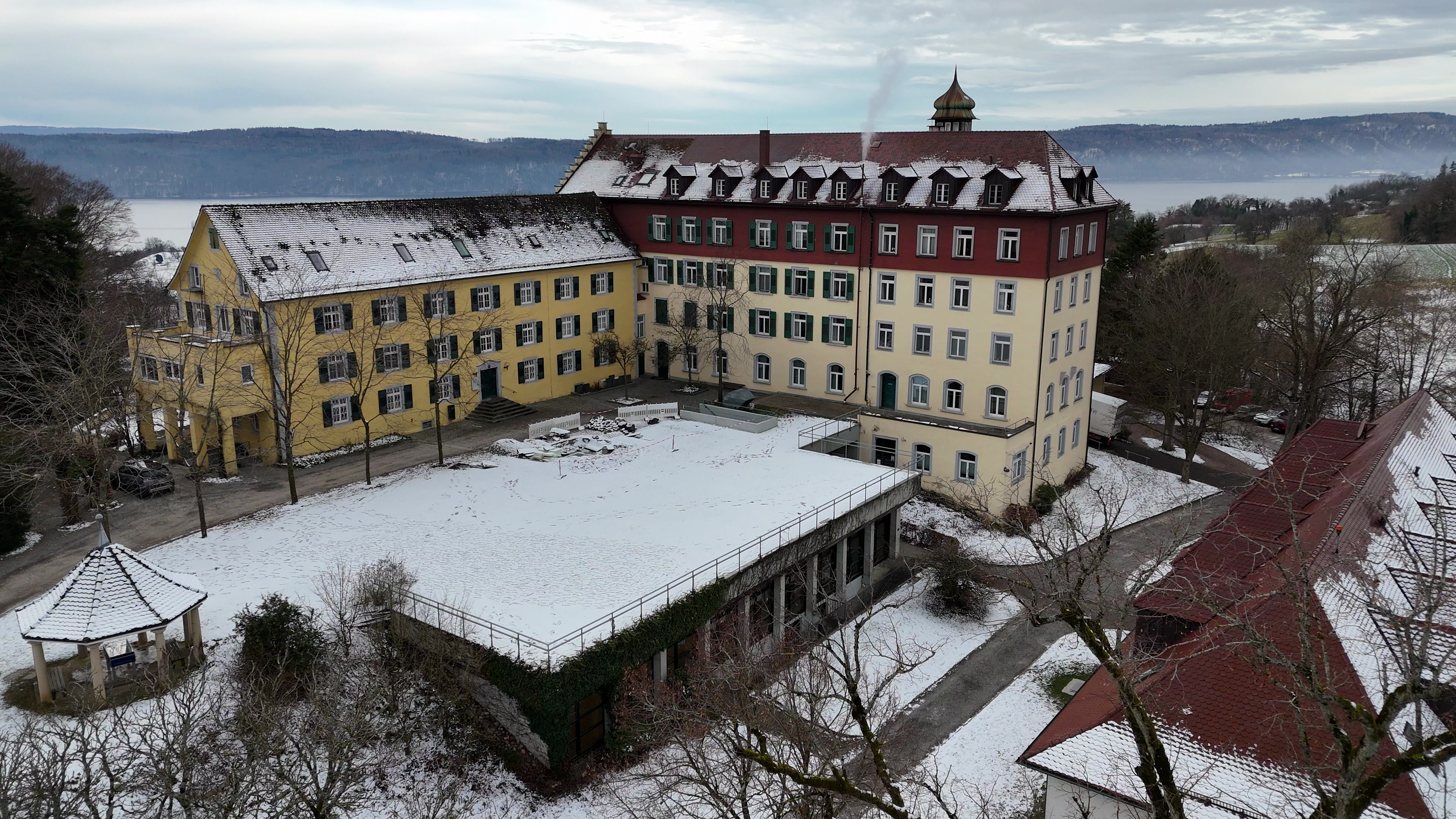
- Spetzgart Castle in Winter
- Interactive map of the Spetzgart Castle area

General information
- Location: Überlingen, Germany
- Coordinates: 47°46′55″N 9°08′26″E
- Elevation: 500 metres (1,600 ft)
- Completed: c. 1200
- Owner: Schule Schloss Salem

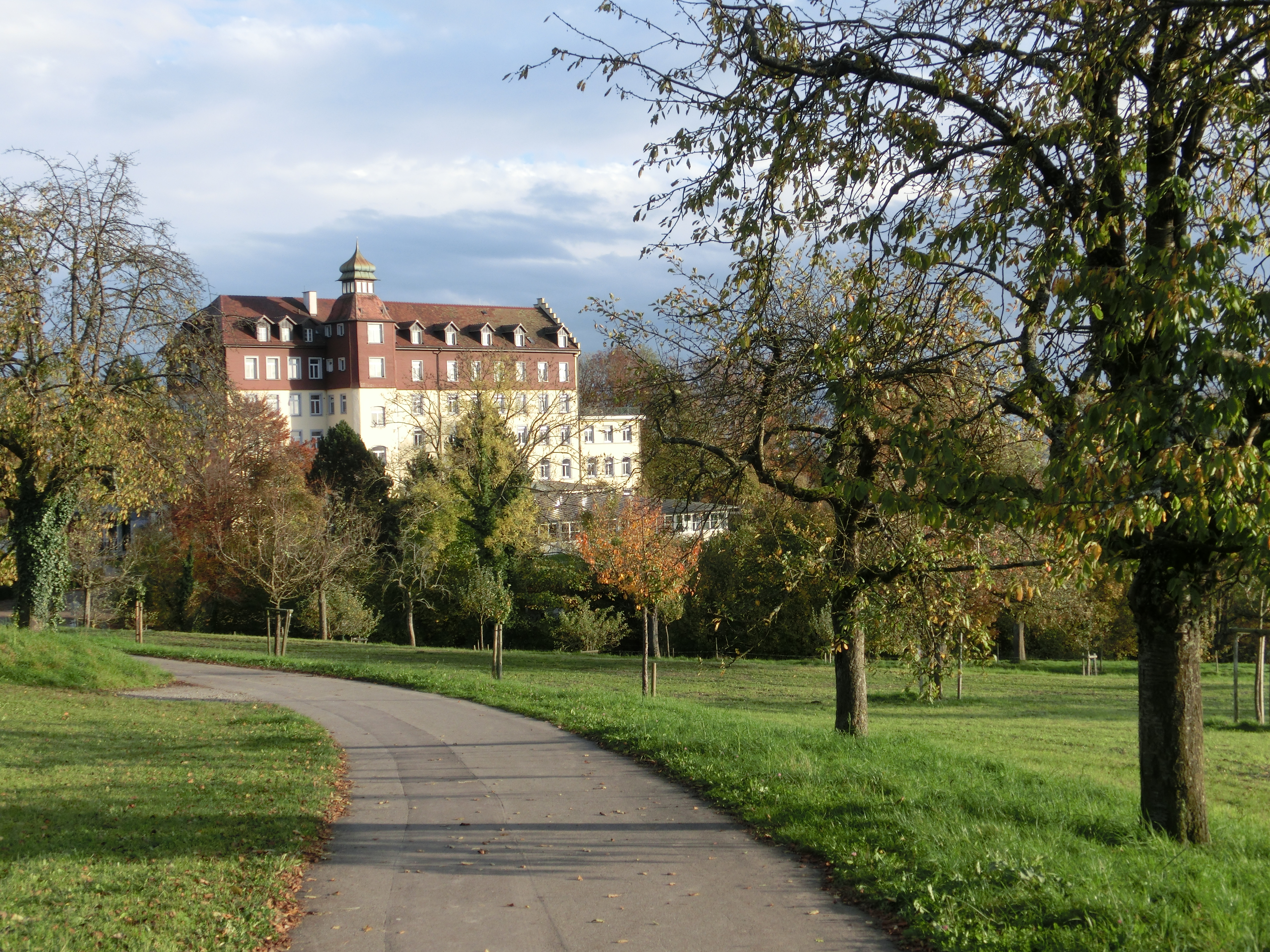
The west wing of Spetzgart Castle, built at the start of the 20th century

Spetzgart Castle (German: Schloss Spetzgart) is a building complex dating back to the Staufer period, which is located in the Hödingen district of Überlingen, Germany. It is currently a campus for the students in grades 10PLUS and 11 of Schule Schloss Salem. The school has been using the castle since May 3rd, 1929. The castle and the surrounding residential buildings form the residential area of Spetzgart.

== Location ==
Spetzgart lies about 1 kilometre (0.62 mi) southwest of Hödingen and 1 kilometre (0.62 mi) north of Goldbach on an elevated coastal terrace above Lake Überlingen, west of the Spetzgarter Tobel nature preserve. The settlement of Zwingenburg lies below Spetzgart.

== History ==
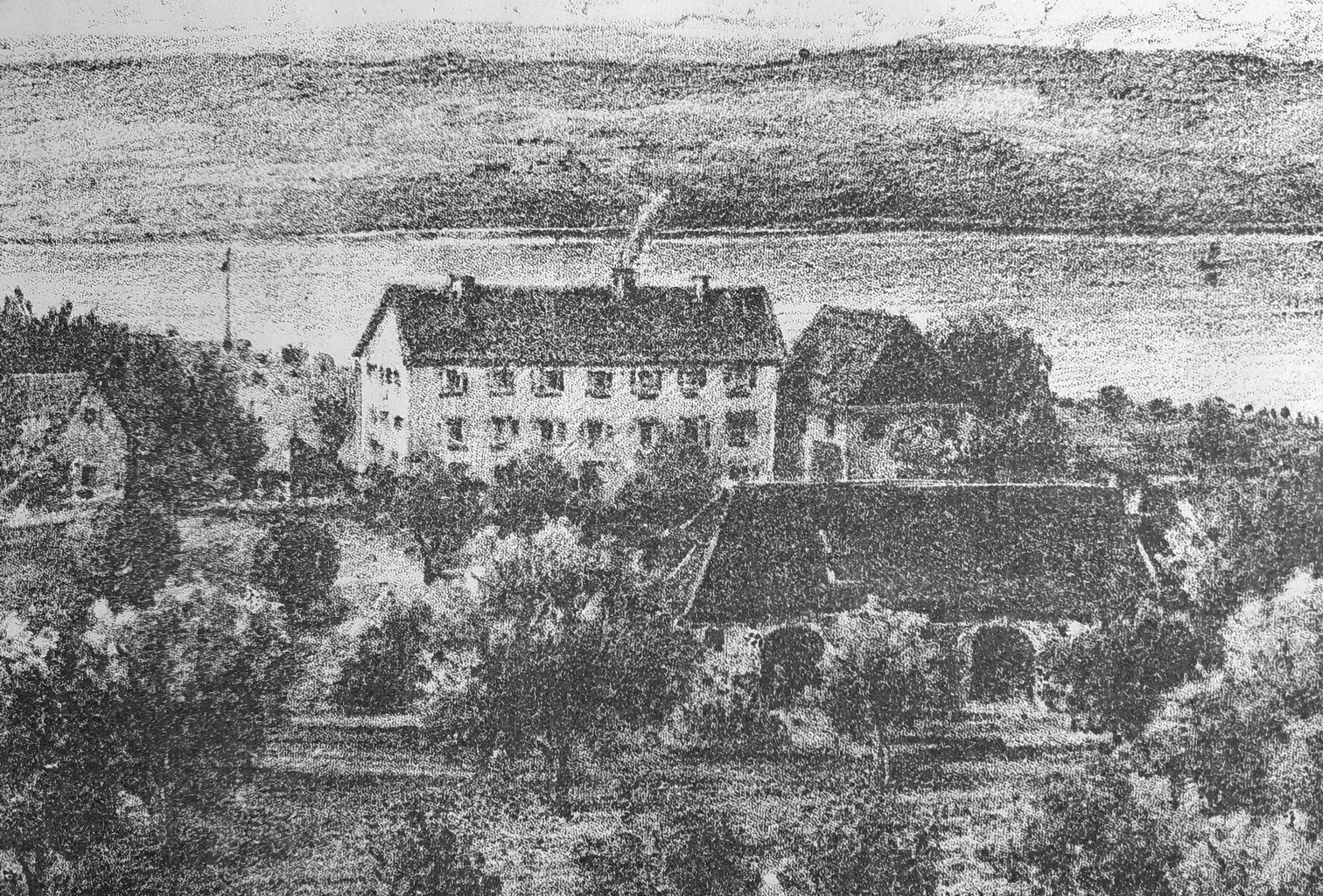
Schloss Spetzgart before the construction of the west wing, drawing by Eduard Schuster

Around the year 1200, the Lords of Spetzgart, a ministerial family of the Counts of Heiligenberg, built a hilltop castle on a spur of the natural terrace. Burchardus de Spehshart was named as owner in 1223. The property was passed to Jos und Hans von Göggingen around 1450, and then was acquired for 1400 guilders in 1481. In 1498, the castle was passed to Premonstratensian monastery of Obermarchtal and was converted into an economic and summer residence of the monastery shortly after. During the Thirty Years' War, the castle was plundered, first by Swedish troops in 1634 and then by French troops in 1643. Around 1650, Abbot Konrad Kneer of Obermarchtal had the castle rebuilt. From 1747 to 1749, the castle was renovated in the baroque style. The stucco celings of the outwardly plain building come from this period. In 1842, the castle church was demolished. Konrad Vogt acquired the property in 1896 and established a sanatorium. At the beginning of the 20th century, the four-story west wing of the castle and its adjoining tower and stepped gable were built perpendicular to the old manor house. In 1928, Schule Schloss Salem acquired the building, and since then, further renovations and new constructions have followed.

== Current Use ==
The Spetzgart Castle campus of Schule Schloss Salem opened on May 3rd, 1929. Years 10PLUS, 11, and 12 live and study at Spetzgart Castle and the Härlen campus, which together form Salem International College. It is one of two locations of the Schule Schloss Salem Fire Brigade, the other being Salem Abbey.
