= Paul Renner (type designer) =

German typeface designer (1878–1956)

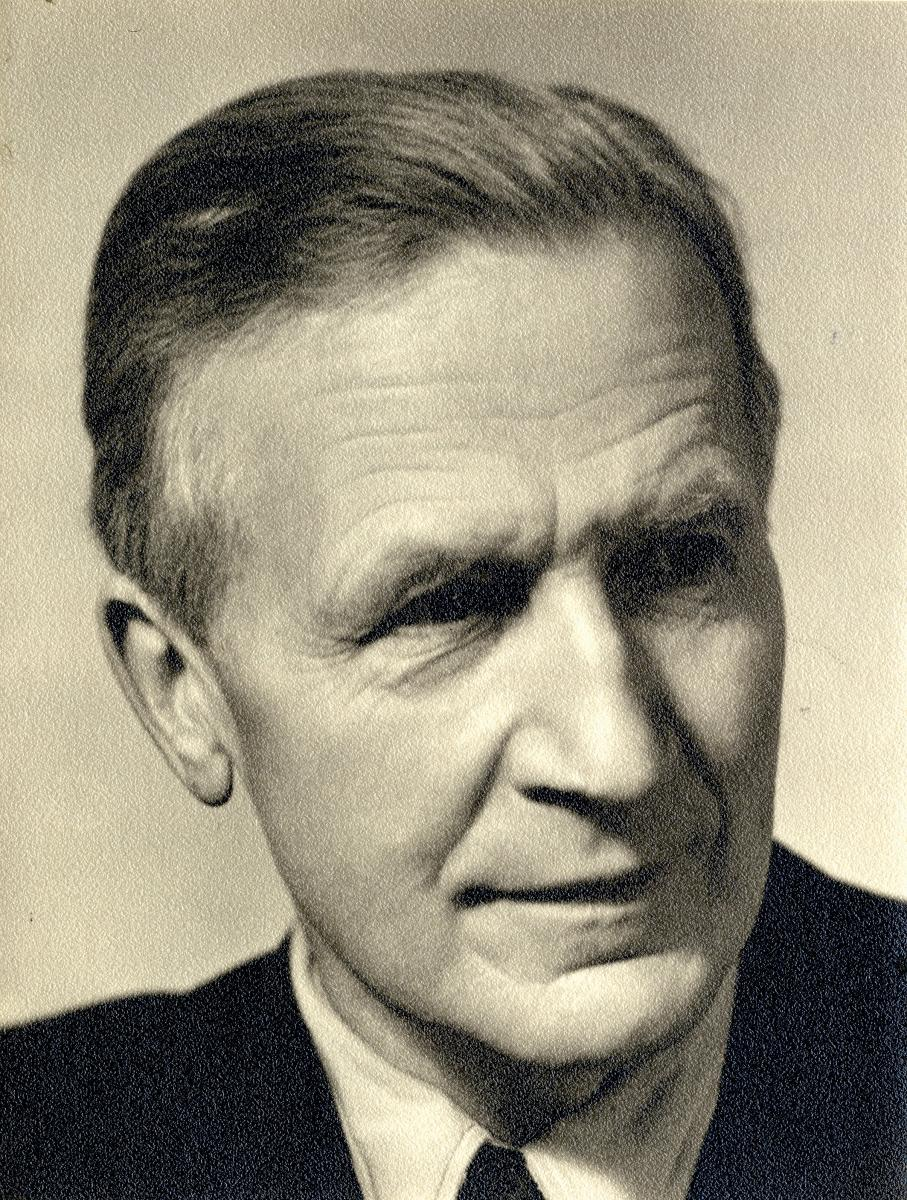
- Paul Renner c. 1927
- Born: Paul Friedrich August Renner; 9 August 1878; Wernigerode, Germany
- Died: 26 April 1956 (aged 77); Hödingen, West Germany
- Occupation: Type designer

Paul Friedrich August Renner (9 August 1878 – 25 April 1956) was a German typeface designer, author, and founder of the Master School for Germany's Printers in Munich. In 1927, he designed the Futura typeface, which became one of the most successful and most-used types of the 20th century.

Renner was born in Wernigerode, and died in Hödingen (today part of Überlingen, Germany).

He had a strict Protestant upbringing, being educated in a 19th-century Gymnasium. He was brought up to have a sense of leadership, duty and responsibility. He disliked abstract art and many forms of modern culture, such as jazz, cinema, and dancing. But equally, he admired the functionalist strain in modernism. Thus, Renner can be seen as a bridge between the traditional (19th century) and the modern (20th century). He attempted to fuse the Gothic and the roman typefaces.

Renner was a prominent member of the Deutscher Werkbund (German Work Federation). Two of his major texts are Typografie als Kunst (Typography as Art) and Die Kunst der Typographie (The Art of Typography). He created a new set of guidelines for good book design and invented the popular Futura, a geometric sans-serif font used by many typographers throughout the 20th century and today. The typeface Architype Renner is based upon Renner's early experimental exploration of geometric letterforms for the Futura typeface, most of which were deleted from the face's character set before it was issued. Tasse, a 1994 typeface is a revival of Renner's 1953 typeface Steile Futura.

The Futura was used for the engraving on the Apollo 11 plaque left on the Moon in July 1969; the original composition, held by NASA, uses Futura for the commemorative text "Here men from the planet Earth first set foot upon the Moon".

Renner was a friend of the German typographer Jan Tschichold and a key participant in the heated ideological and artistic debates of that time.

== Politics ==
Even before 1932, Renner made his opposition to the Nazis very clear, notably in his book “Kulturbolschewismus?” (Cultural Bolshevism?). He was unable to find a German publisher, so it was published by his Swiss friend Eugen Rentsch. While designing his typeface Futura, Renner appeared at a public forum in Munich with several other German authors to speak out against the Nazis and other right-leaning parties who criticized anything that deviated from tradition as being "cultural bolshevism."

After the Nazis seized power in March 1933, Renner was arrested and dismissed from his post in Munich in 1933, and subsequently emigrated to Switzerland. Soon after the book's publication, it was withdrawn from the German book market, until a photo-mechanical reprint was issued by Stroemfeld Verlag, Frankfurt am Main/Basel, in 2003. The new edition included comments by Roland Reuss and Peter Staengle (a main source for these notes).

Typeface specimen Futura

== Typefaces ==
- Architype Renner (1927)
- Futura (1927)
- Plak (1930)
- Futura Black (1929)
- Futura light (1932)
- Ballade (1938)
- Renner Antiqua (1939)

== Books ==
All books are German editions.

- Typographie als Kunst, Munich 1922
- Mechanisierte Grafik. Schrift, Typo, Foto, Film, Farbe, Berlin 1930
- Kulturbolschewismus?, Zurich 1932,
- Die Kunst der Typographie, Berlin 1939, New print Augsburg 2003; ISBN 3-87512-414-6,
- Das moderne Buch, Lindau 1946,
- Ordnung und Harmonie der Farben. Eine Farbenlehre für Künstler und Handwerker, Ravensburg 1947
- Vom Geheimnis der Darstellung, Frankfurt 1955
