= Hödingen (Überlingen) =

- Ortsteil of Überlingen
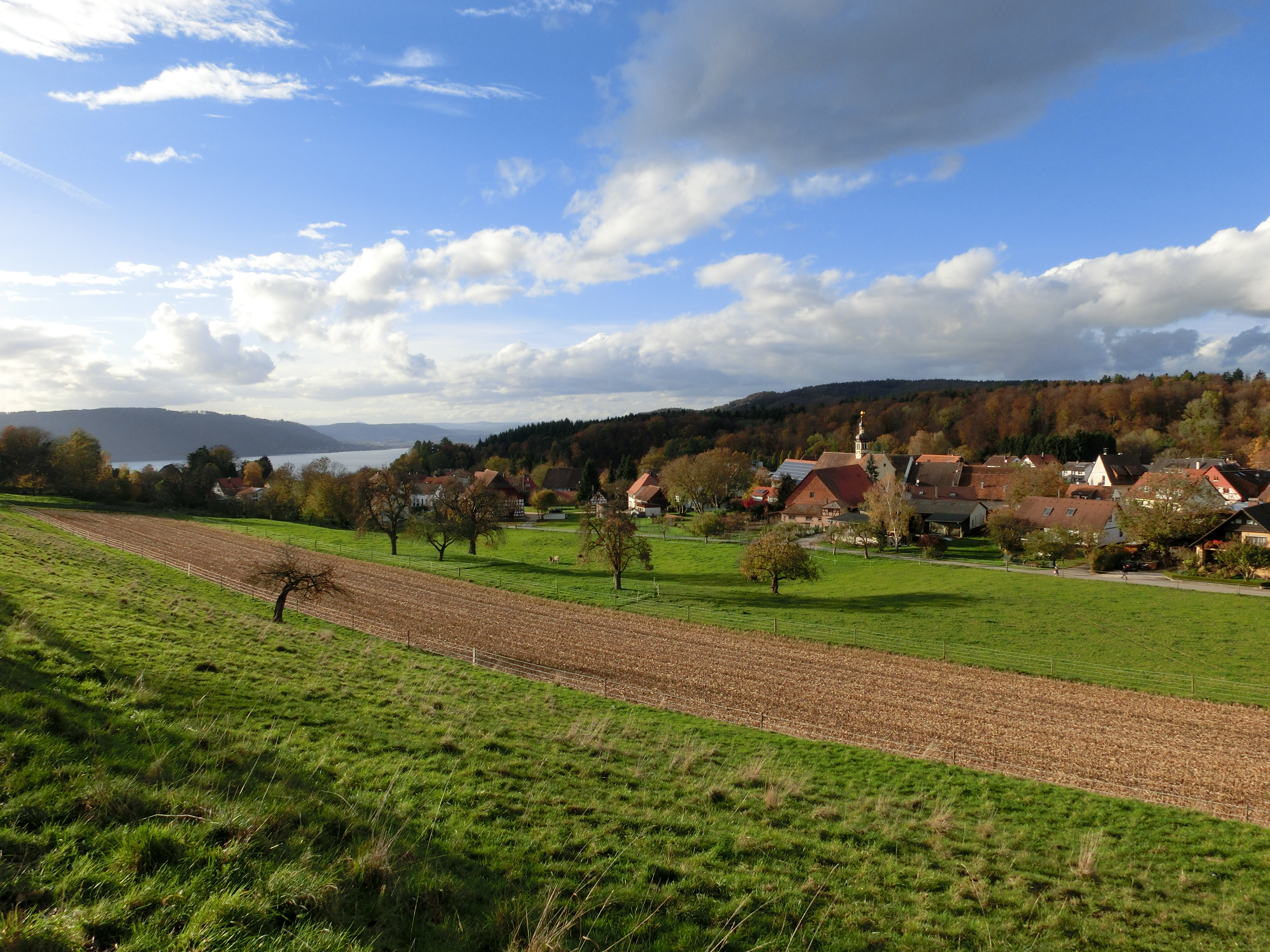
- Hödingen

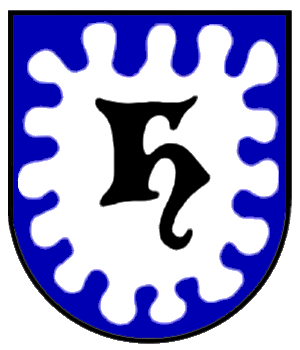
- Coat of arms
- Interactive map of Hödingen
- Location within Germany Location within Baden-Württemberg
- Coordinates: 47°47′20″N 09°07′55″E
- Country: Germany
- State: Baden-Württemberg
- Admin. region: Tübingen
- District: Bodenseekreis
- City: Überlingen

Area
  - Total: 2.86 km^{2} (1.10 sq mi)

Population
  - Total: 805
  - Density: 281/km^{2} (729/sq mi)
- Time zone: UTC+01:00 (CET)
  - Summer (DST): UTC+02:00 (CEST)
- Postal codes: 88662
- Dialling codes: 07551
- Vehicle registration: FN

Hödingen is a village in the municipality of Überlingen, in the west of the Bodenseekreis in southwest Baden-Württemberg, Germany. It is located about 3 kilometres (1.9 mi) northwest of Überlingen.

== Geography ==
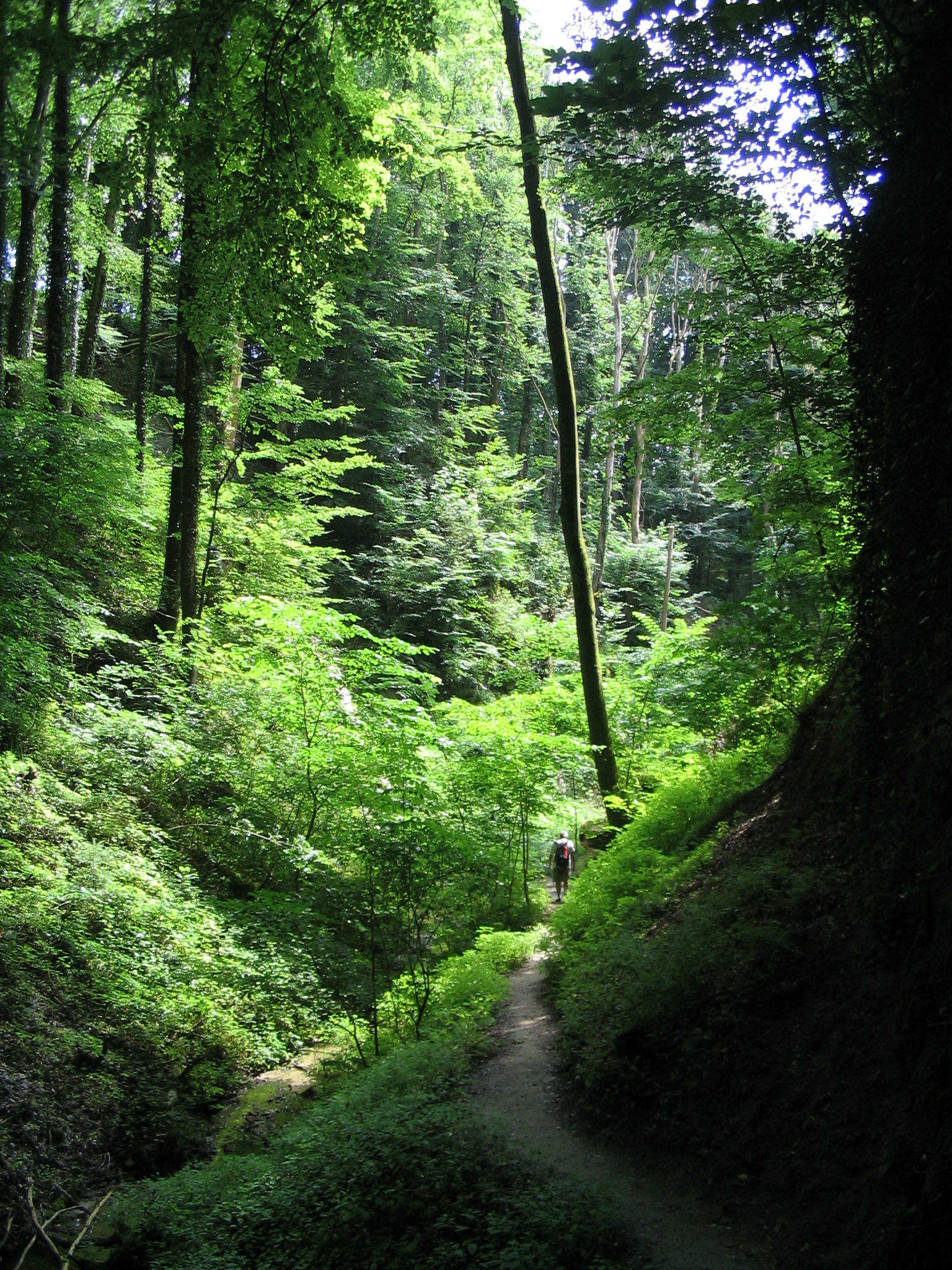
Hödinger Tobel

The village of Hödingen is located between multiple nature reserves: Hödinger Berg and the Spetzgarter Tobel to the east, the Hödinger Tobel and part of the Sipplinger Dreieck to the West (of which the two tobels (ravines) are among the oldest nature preserves in Germany). To the southwest of the village are steep Molasse cliffs typical of the Lake Überlingen area. The Katharinenfelsen protected area adjoins here, in which lies the so-called Gletchermühle (literally 'glacier mill' although it is actually a glacial pothole). At the foot of the cliffs are the Goldbach heathen caves, which are hundreds of years old. To the north of Hödingen is the Bundesstraße 31n (Stockach – Überlingen).

Länglehof and Spetzgart Castle are both within Hödingen, which encompasses 286 hectares (710 acres). Apart from the border with Sipplingen to the west (with Süßenmühle to the south), Hödingen is entirely surrounded by Überlingen. The Überlingen villages of Hohenlinden, Höllwangen, Brachenreute, Goldbach, and Brünnensbach all border Hödingen.

== History ==
Several burial mounds near the village suggest early settlement during the Hallstatt period. A castle site (Bürgle) near the current church indicates that castle existed here at least before the 13th century. Hödingen itself was first mentioned in 1242 as Hedingen; derived from the name Hedo. The village came into the possession the Knights Hospitaller commandery in Überlingen in 1297 and from 1396, it belonged to the Konstanz hospital. A Ramsberg estate and an estate of the Konstanz Cathedral chapter have been documented in the village since the 14th century, and later, an estate of Petershausen Abbey. Hödingen was burned down in the Thirty Years' War.

Low jurisdiction has always been held by Constance, while high jurisdiction was with the County of Heiligenberg (Fürstenberg) until 1779, since which it has been held by the free imperial city of Überlingen. Hödingen became an independent municipality as part of the Baden district office Überlingen (district after 1939). The village has since grown in population due to construction in the 1950s and 1960s.

On 1 July 1974, Hödingen, along with the village of Nesselwangen to the northwest, merged into the municipality of Überlingen.

Historical population
Year	Pop.	±%
1852	335	—
1871	314	−6.3%
1880	328	+4.5%
1890	301	−8.2%
1900	274	−9.0%
1910	309	+12.8%
1925	297	−3.9%
1933	345	+16.2%
1939	344	−0.3%
1950	427	+24.1%
1956	469	+9.8%
1961	497	+6.0%
1970	500	+0.6%
2014	805	+61.0%
2018	793	−1.5%
Population size may be affected by changes in administrative divisions.

In 2017, the village celebrated 775 years of Hödingen's existence.

== Politics ==
As with all other villages that merged with Überlingen in the municipality reforms of the 1970s, Hödingen elected to replace the positions of Mayor and Municipal council with an Ortsvorsteher (local head) and an Ortschaftsrat (local council). The current Ortsvorsteher is Martin Kessler.

Hödingen's coat of arms has a silver background with a blue cloud border, with a large black H in fraktur script in the center.

== Churches ==
=== St. Bartholomäus ===
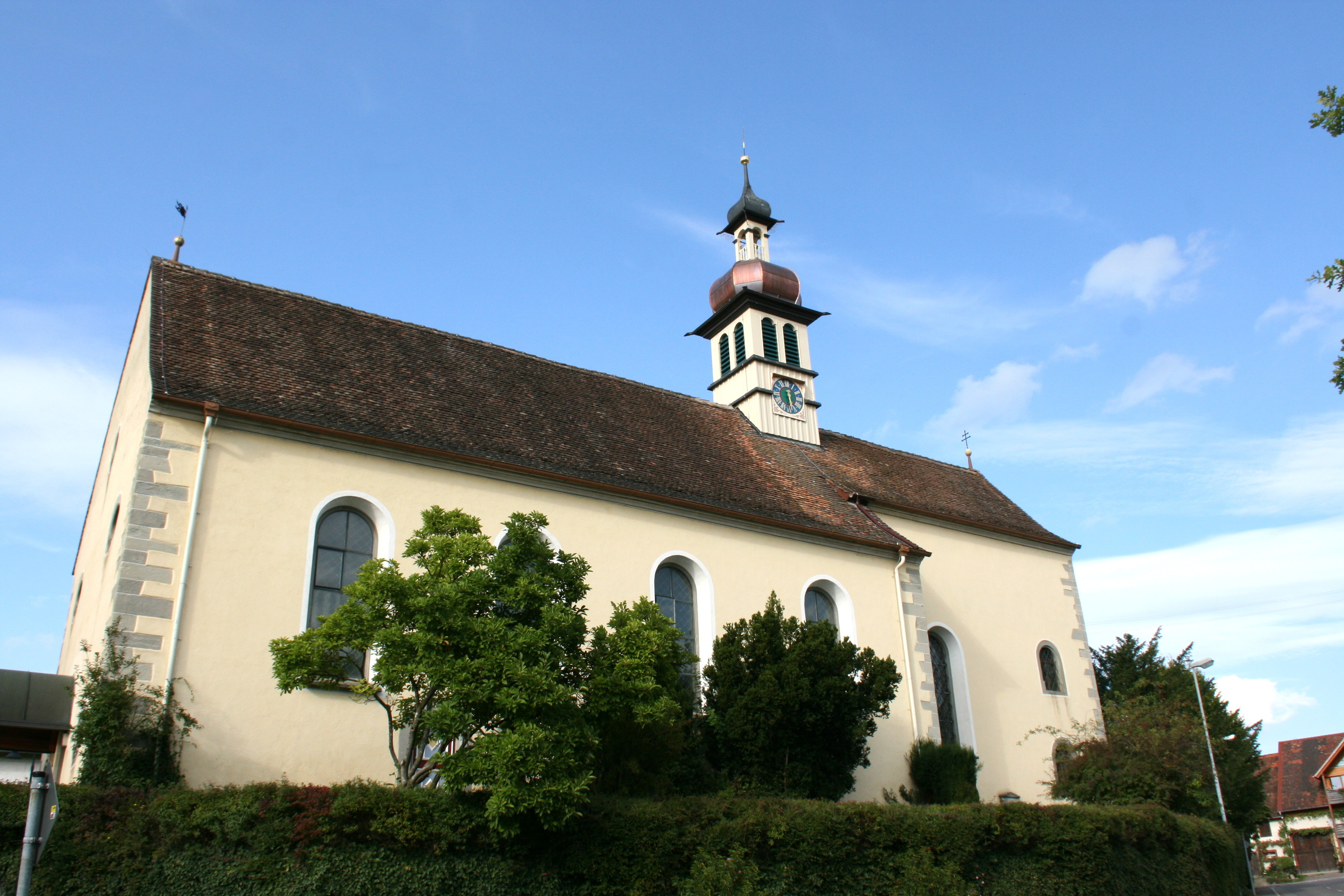
St. Bartholomäus Church in Hödingen

The Hödingen church was first mentioned in 1343, as a branch of St. Michael's in Aufkirch. It was under the administration of the Mainau Island Teutonic Order until 1557, after which it became a branch of the Überlingen Cathedral of St. Nicholas. After Hödingen and the Church were burnt down in the Thirty Years‘ War, a new building was built as Marian pilgrimage site, financed by donations and led by a Capuchin friar.

In 1684/85, the Konstanz Hospital constructed a new church on the site,which was subsequently consecrated as St. Bartholomäus (St. Bartholomew). There was a second consecration in honor of Mary in 1687. The pilgrimages reached their peak in the 18th century, and St. Bartholomäus became its own parish in 1785.

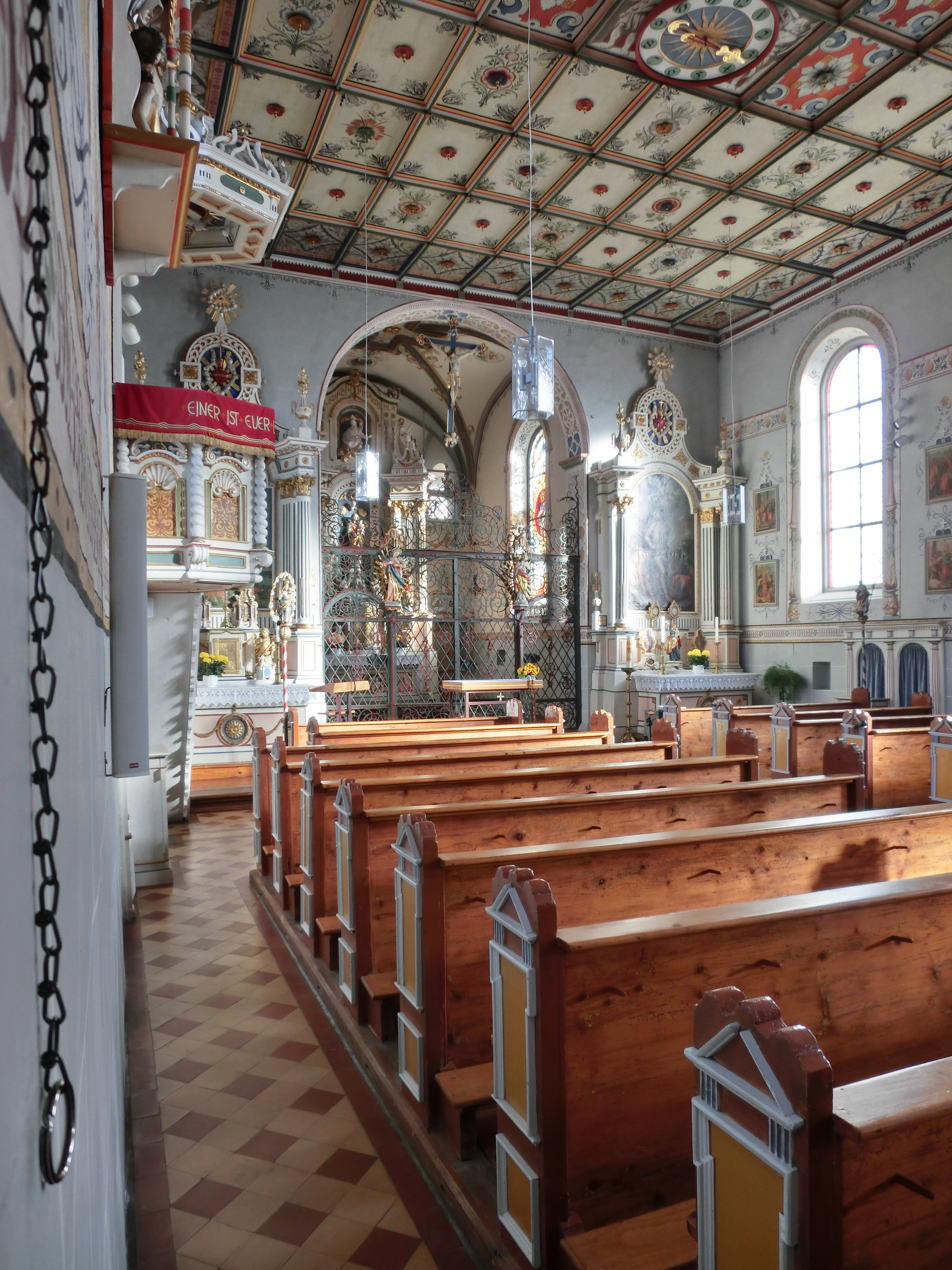
Inside of the church

Today, St. Bartholomäus is part of the Sipplingen parish. By the time of the 775 Years of Hödingen celebration, the church and its surroundings had been extensively renovated.

==== Architecture ====
St. Bartholomäus is in the late Renaissance style, and is an aisleless church with a choir. The building has large arches and smaller ellipse-shaped windows. The church does not have a tower, but rather a multi-story ridge turret with an onion dome.

== Economy and Infrastructure ==
The center of Hödingen is still very agriculturally dominated, although local tourism is on the rise.

=== Traffic ===
Before the exit from country road 7786 on to highway B 31n, the junction of K 7772 serves as the main entrance to Hödingen.

Hödingen is connected to the Lake Constance-Upper Swabia transport association (bodo), and can be reached by bus from the neighborhood of Bonndorf in Überlingen, or by dial-a-ride.

== Education ==
Hödingen has an elementary school with a gym.

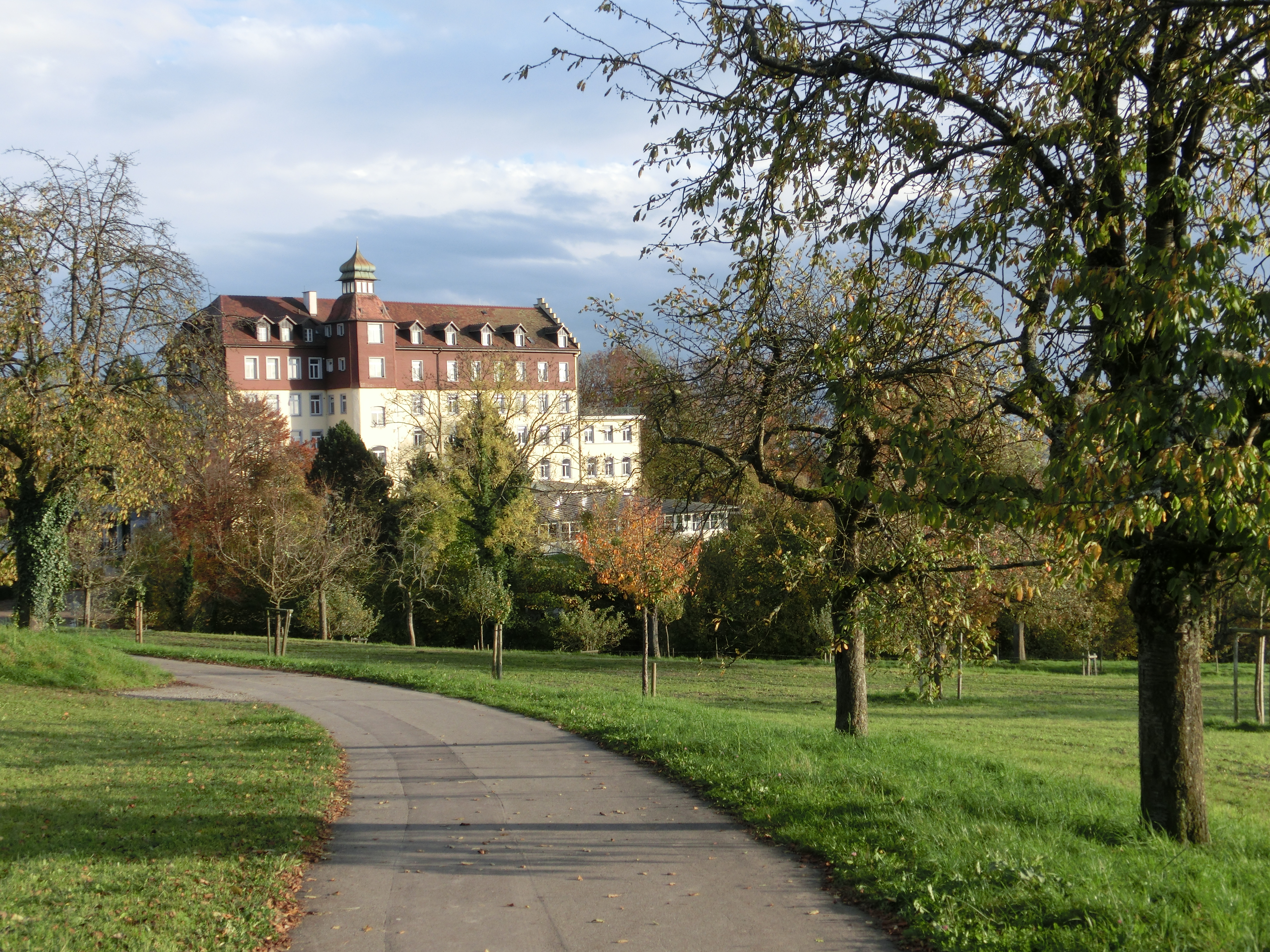
Schloss Spetzgart

Southeast of Hödingen is Schloss Spetzgart, a campus Schule Schloss Salem since 1928. The Härlen campus is on the other side of the Spetzgarter Tobel.

== Literature ==
- Irmgard Dechow, Helena Vogler: Ein Gnadenort über dem See – Ein Beitrag zur Kirchen- und Wallfahrtsgeschichte St. Bartholomäus zu Hödingen. Selbstverlag Katholische Landfrauenbewegung Hödingen, 2011.
- Irmgard Dechow (Hrsg.): Hödingen. Ansichten eines kleinen Linzgaudorfes. Eugen Stähle Verlag, 1993.
- Michael Losse, Bürgersinn e.V. Überlingen (Hrsg.), Kulturamt Überlingen, Kur- und Touristik Überlingen GmbH: Überlingen am Bodensee – Kulturgeschichte und Architektur. Michael Imhof Verlag, 2010, ISBN 9783865685759.
- Hans Schleuning (Red.): Überlingen und der Linzgau am Bodensee. (Teilauflage auch als: Der Kreis Überlingen.) Theiss, Stuttgart 1972, ISBN 3-8062-0102-1.
