= Hödinger Tobel =

Nature reserve in Baden-Württemberg, Germany

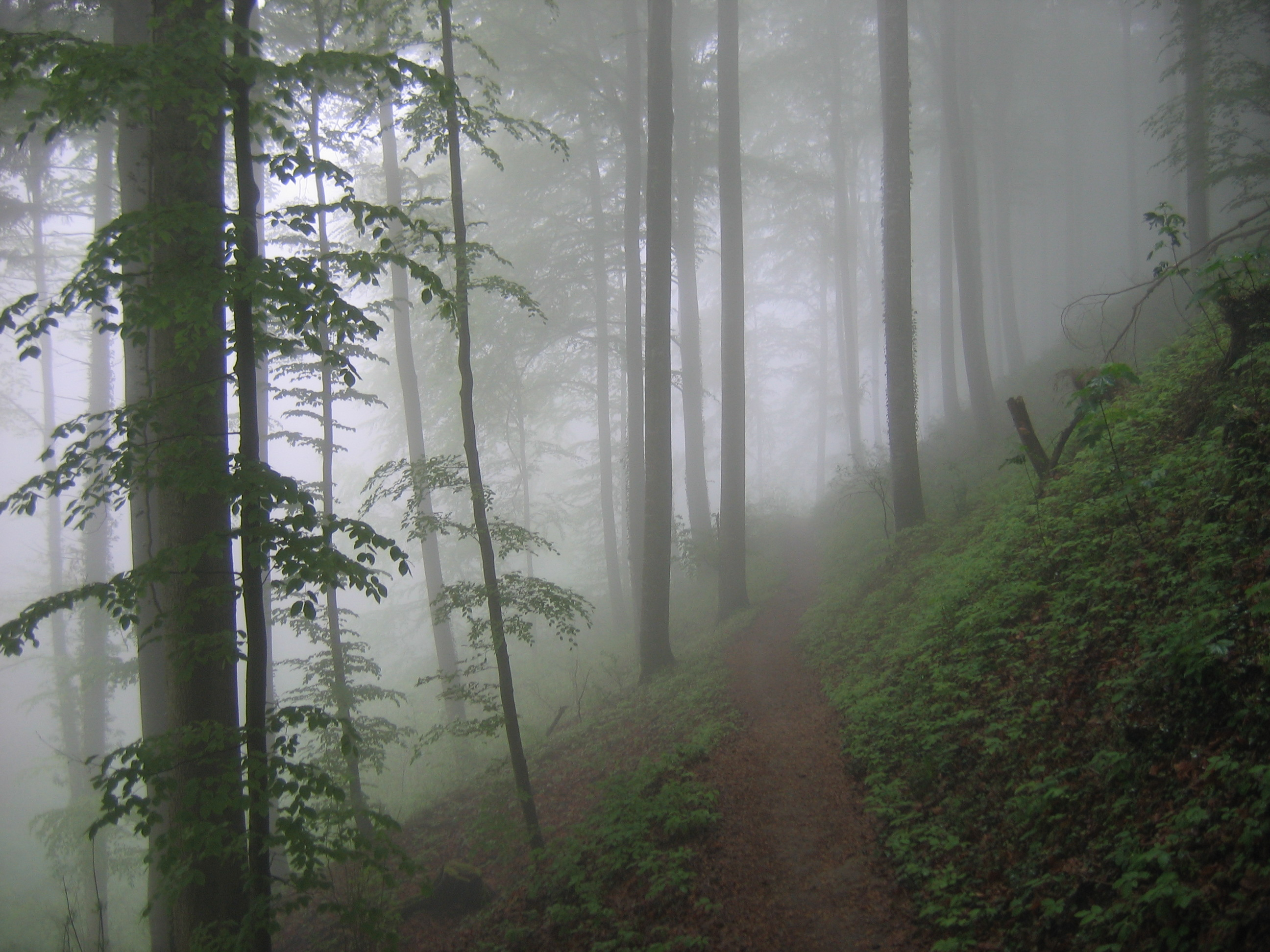
- In the Hödinger Tobel
- Interactive map of Hödinger Tobel
- Location: Municipalities of Überlingen and Sipplingen, Bodenseekreis, Baden-Württemberg, Germany
- Area: 27.5 ha (68 acres)
- Elevation: 530 m (1,740 ft)
- Established: October 21, 1938; 87 years ago
- Governing body: Tübingen Regional Council

Hödinger Tobel is a ravine and nature reserve in Germany (NSG-Number 4054). The reserve is located northwest of the city of Überlingen and southeast of Sipplingen, in the Bodenseekreis district of Baden-Württemberg. The reserve was designated as such on October 21, 1938 by the Baden Minister of Culture and Education, whose successor is the Tübingen Regional Council.

== Location ==
The reserve, which is nearly 28 hectares (69 acres) large, is part of the Lake Constance basin. Of those, 9.5 hectares (23 acres) are in the municipality of Sipplingen and 18 hectares (44 acres) are in the municipality of Überlingen. It is located 300 metres (980 ft) west of the village of Hödingen and sits at an elevation of 530 metres (1,740 ft).

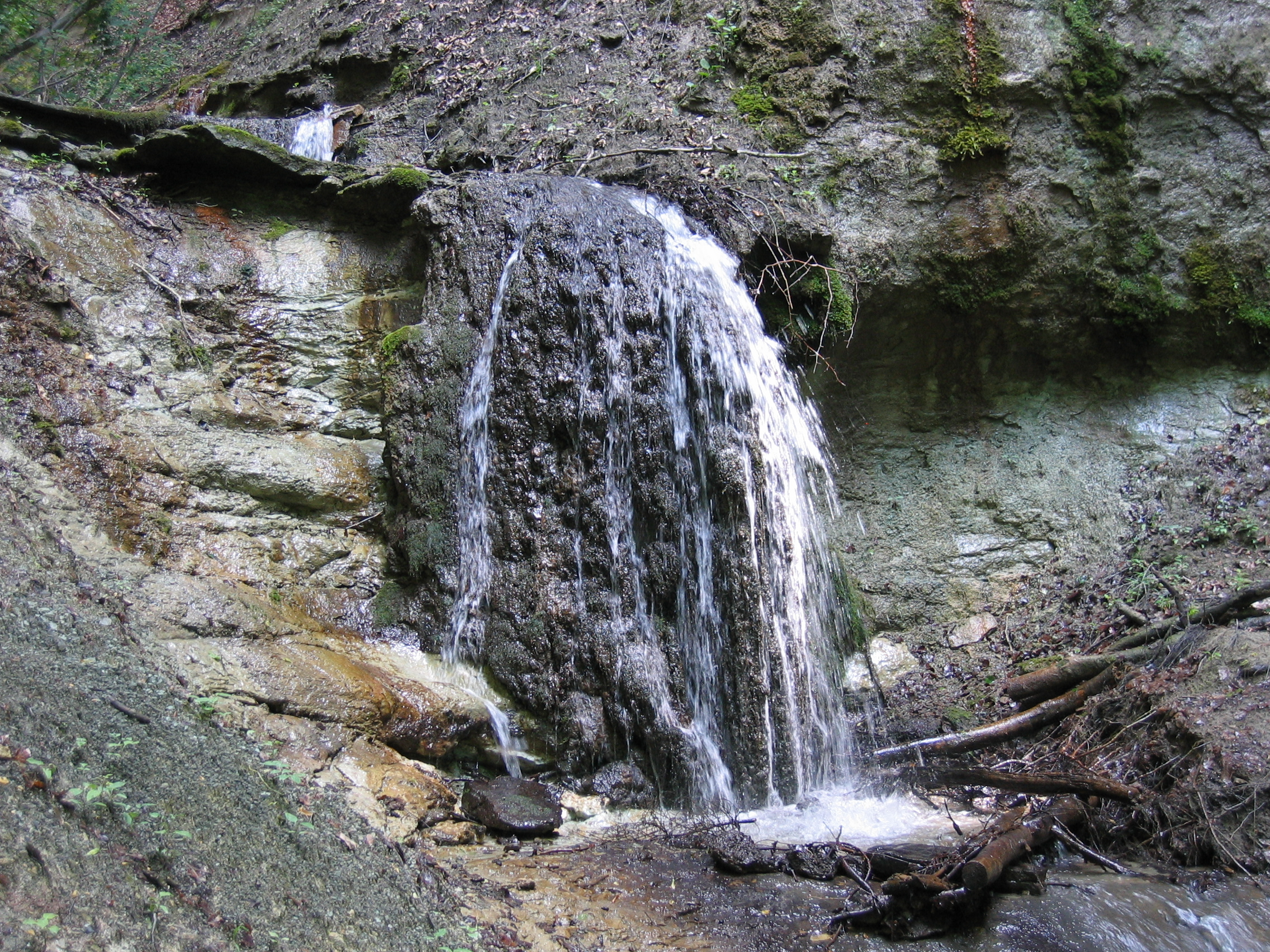
Waterfall on a molasse cliff in the Hödinger Tobel

== Geology ==
Over a length of approximately 2 kilometres (1.2 mi), the stream forming the ravine descends around 170 metres (560 ft) to Lake Constance. The ravine, characterized by landslides, spring layers, and tufa deposits, is caused by strong postglacial water erosion.

== Protection ==
The main purpose of protection is to preserve the erosion ravine. The existing Orchid-Beech forest and Cytisus-Pine forest with occurrences of alpine plant species fall under special protection.

== Flora ==
Notable protected species occurring in the ravine include:

- The perennial honesty (Lunaria rediviva), a species in the family Brassicaceae
- The blue fescue (Festuca cinerea), a plant in the Poaceae family
- The bloody crane's-bill (Geranium sanguineum), a plant in the Geraniaceae family
- The common hepatica (Hepatica nobilis), a species in the Ranunculaceae family
- The red helleborine (Cephalanthera rubra), a plant in the Orchid family
- The martagon lily (Lilium martagon), a plant in the Liliaceae family
