= Salem International College =

Salem International College may refer to:

- Salem International University, located in United States
- Schule Schloss Salem, located in Germany
