= Fodor (typeface) =

Geometrical typeface

Fodor is a geometrical typeface designed by Dutch graphic designer and type designer Wim Crouwel, around 1973.

== History ==
Fodor was designed for the covers of the magazine published by Museum Fodor in Amsterdam. The main text on the covers were set with an electric typewriter, and the monospaced typeface that it used created strong horizontal and vertical lines. Crouwel made these visible by using a regular pattern of pink dots on an orange background. He then used this grid to draw the letters fodor and a set of numbers. Later, a complete alphabet was developed from the wordmark.

== Digital Fodor ==
The digital version of Fodor was made by the type foundry The Foundry in London. It is part of the Architype 3 Crouwel collection. Other typefaces in this collection are 'Architype Gridnik', 'Architype New Alphabet', 'Architype Stedelijk' and 'Architype Catalogue'.

=== Other typefaces by Crouwel ===
- Gridnik
- New Alphabet
