= Spetzgarter Tobel =

Nature Reserve in Germany

Spetzgarter Tobel Nature Reserve
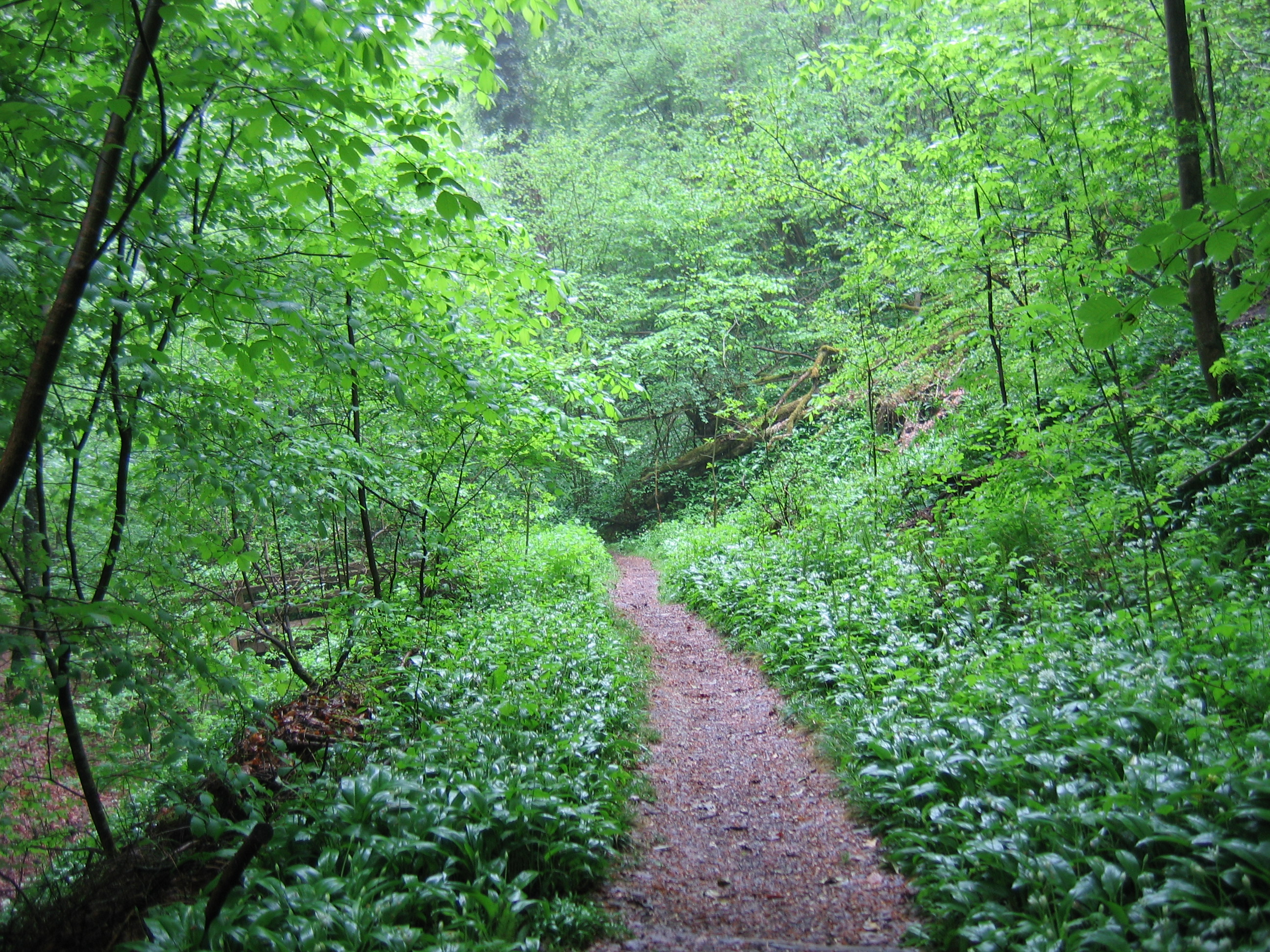
- Interactive map of Spetzgarter Tobel Nature Reserve
- Location: Überlingen, Bodenseekreis, Baden-Württemberg, Germany
- Coordinates: 47°46′49″N 9°08′28″E
- Area: 0.126 km^{2} (0.049 sq mi)
- Max. elevation: 523 m (1,716 ft)
- Min. elevation: 427 m (1,401 ft)
- Established: October 29, 1938; 87 years ago
- Governing body: Tübingen Regional Council

The Spetzgarter Tobel is a ravine and Nature Reserve (NSG-Number 4.055) located in the northwest of Überlingen, Germany.

== Area ==
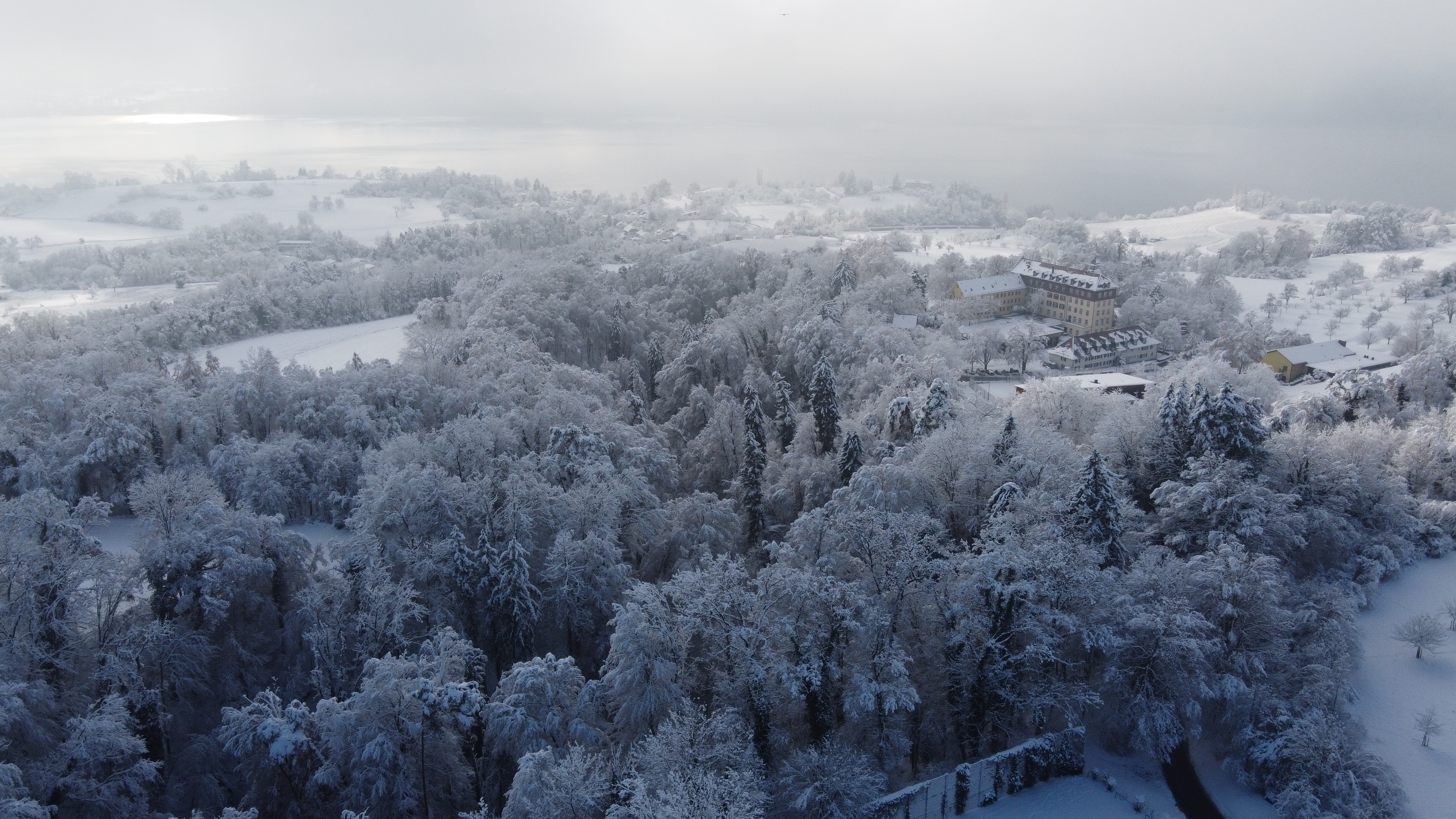
The Spetzgarter Tobel in the Winter

The preserve has an area of about 12.5 Hectares, and is part of the Lake Constance Basin. It is to the north of Bundesstraße 31, between the neighborhood of Goldbach to the south, Spetzgart to the Northwest, and Aufkirch to the East. It spans from an elevation of 427 m (1,401 ft) to an elevation of 520 m (1,710 ft). The preserve has 2 main trails - both starting from Spetzgart Castle- One leads to the Aufkircherstraße, and the other leads to the neighborhood of Goldbach.

=== Protection ===
The main purpose of the nature reserve is to protect the erosion ravine, through which a year-round creek named Killbach flows. The creek cuts up to 65 m (213 ft) deep into the gorge, through the "Sipplinger Molasse" and sandstone of the Überlingen area, and flows into the Überlinger Arm of Lake Constance. A special protection applies to the existing orchid-beech forest, the ash forest, and other alpine plant species.

=== Flora ===
From the protected flora, along with the fern communities, European ash, wych elm, and sycamore maple populations, the following plant species are to be mentioned:

- Wild garlic (Allium ursinum), a species in the genus Allium in the subfamily Allioideae
- Lily of the valley (Convallaria majalis), currently one of three species in the genus Convallaria in the subfamily Convallarioideae
- The shrub crown vetch (Hippocrepis emerus), a species in the genus Hippocrepis in the family Fabaceae
- Goat's beard (Aruncus dioicus), a plant species from the subfamily Spiraeoideae within the family Rosaceae

== See also ==
- Naturschutzgebiet (Germany)
- List of canyons
