= Coordinatograph =

A coordinatograph is an instrument that mechanically plots X and Y coordinates onto a surface, such as in compiling maps or in plotting control points such as in electronic circuit design.

One historic application of a coordinatograph was a machine that precisely placed and cut rubylith to create photomasks for early integrated circuits, including some of the earliest generations of the modern microprocessors used in personal computers. The coordinatograph produced layout would then be photographically reduced 100:1 to create the production photomask.

== See also ==
- Cartography
- Photolithography
- Etching (microfabrication)
- Design for manufacturability
- Semiconductor device fabrication
