= Rubylith =

Brand of masking film

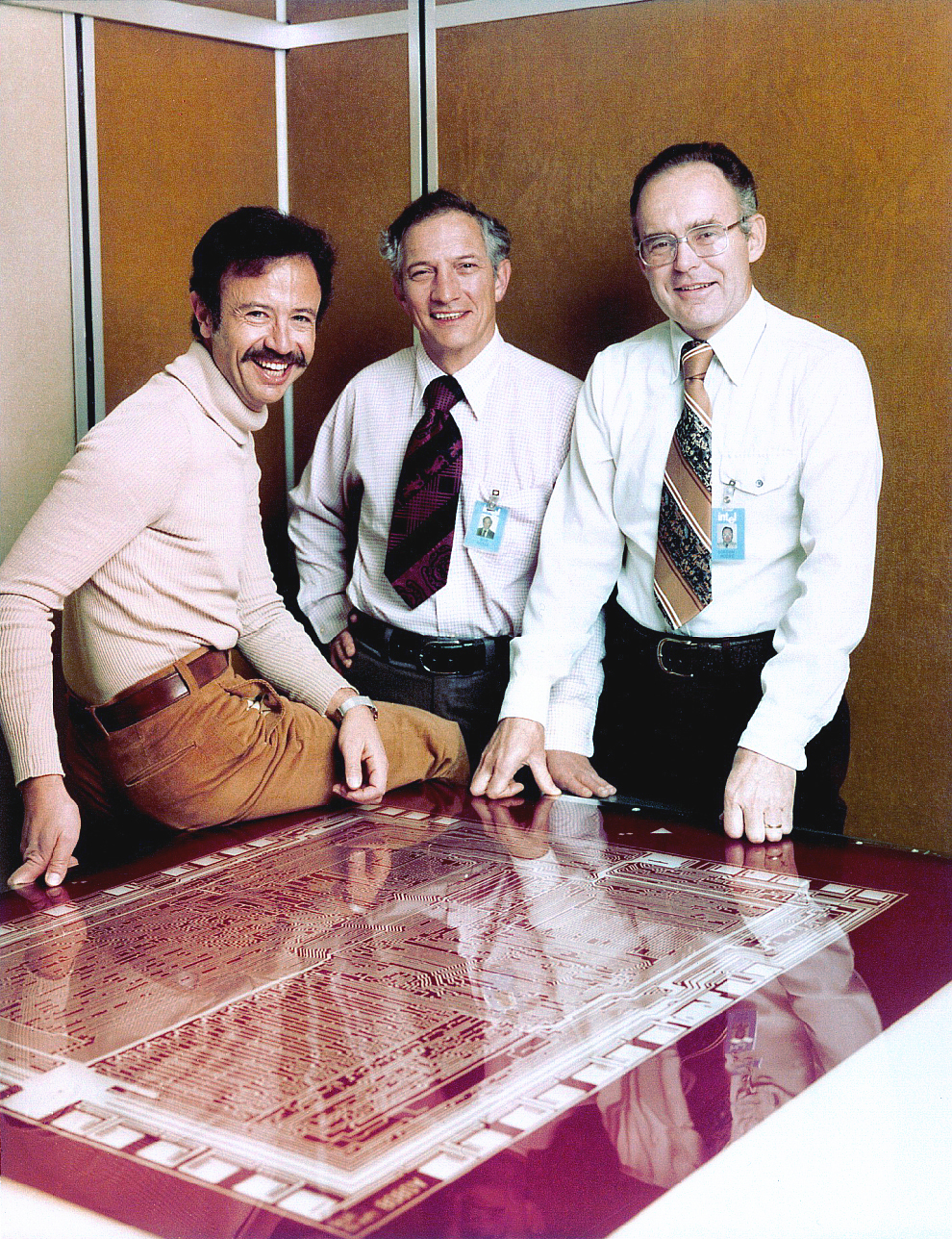
Founders of Intel inc. (Andy Grove, Robert Noyce and Gordon Moore) standing next to a Rubylith with a cutout for the Intel 8080A microprocessor, 1978.

Rubylith is a brand of masking film, invented and trademarked by the Ulano Corporation. Today the brand has become genericized to the point that it has become synonymous with all coloured masking films.

Rubylith consists of two films sandwiched together. The bottom layer is a clear polyester backing sheet; the top layer is a translucent, red (ruby) coloured sheet. The top layer can be cut and peeled away from the bottom layer. The top layer's colour is light-safe for orthochromatic films (which are sensitive to blue and green light but insensitive to red light).

Rubylith is used in many areas of graphic design, typically to produce masks for various printing techniques. For example it is often used to mask off areas of a design when using a photoresist to produce printing plates for offset lithography or gravure. It is also frequently used during screen-printing.

Ulano also produced a yellow-(amber-)coloured masking film called Amberlith that was light-safe only for blue-sensitive emulsions. They discontinued production in late 2007.

== Typeface production ==
Letraset, and other typeface foundries that used photographic reproduction, used Rubylith cut by hand with knives to produce primary art that was then photographically reduced to make the final dry-transfer typeface products. The process is described by Freda Sack in an interview with Unit Editions.

== VLSI production ==
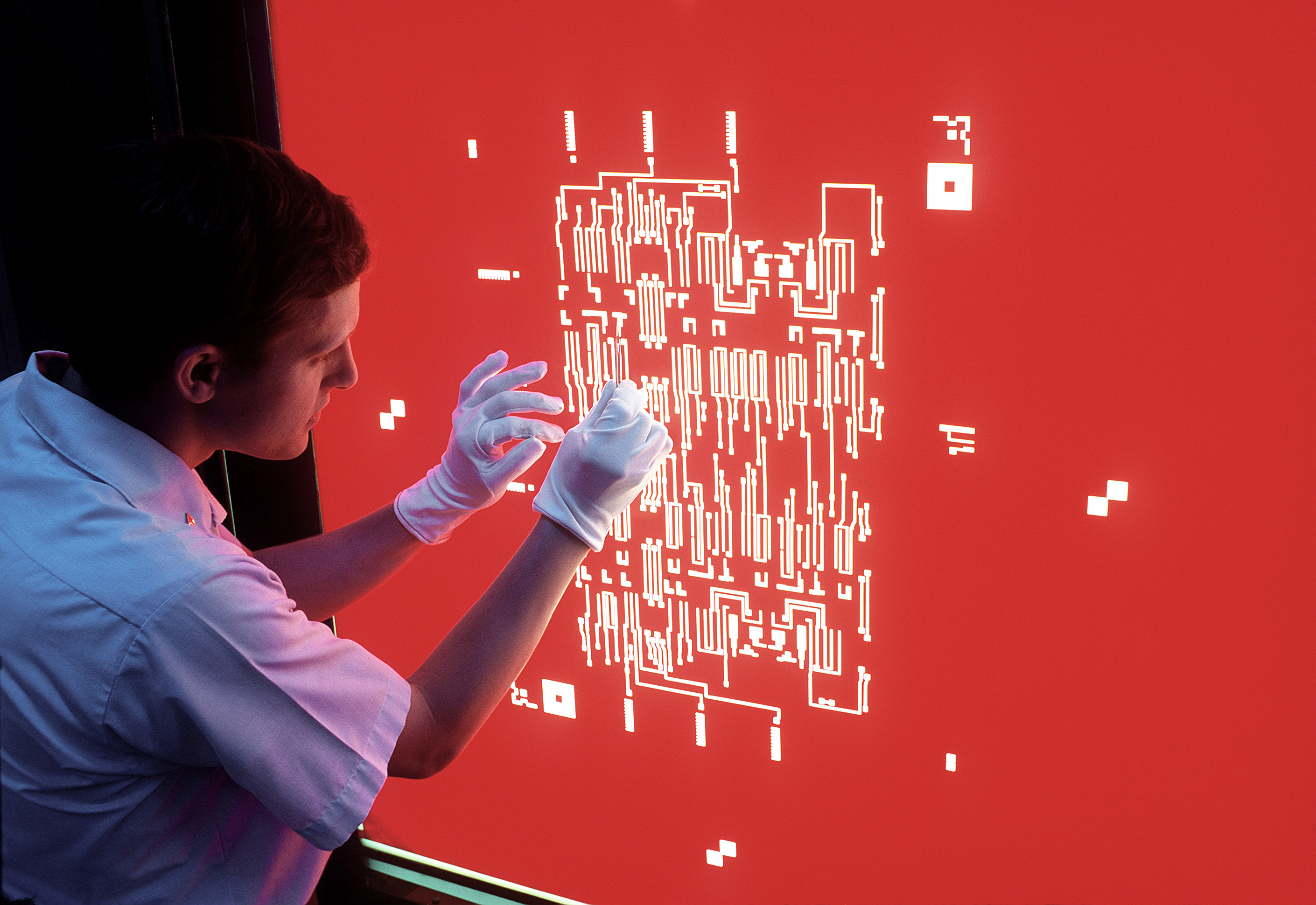
A technician makes small-detail corrections of a circuit image on a large Rubylith. The image will be copied, miniaturized, and utilized in making computer chips.

External images
- Original 8080 rubylith
- Rubylith operators at Intel, 1970s
- Mask Rubylith Layer for 4K DRAM

Rubylith was used in the early days of semiconductors and integrated circuits manufacturing as stencils to make photomasks (reticles). The physical layouts of the first generations of Intel microprocessors were first hand drawn on graph paper. A technician would then use a coordinatograph to precisely cut the rubylith (laminated onto a transparent plastic such as mylar) and a knife (X-Acto) to peel the appropriate sections away while it was resting on the light table. The finished Rubylith mechanical masters were then photo reduced (onto a photographic film) up to 100 times and then step and repeated on to glass plates for production use. Usually, several such masks were made that were then used layer by layer.

Shortly after the 8008, Intel started using Calma's computer-aided design system that ran on a Data General minicomputer; the output masters may have stayed Rubylith for a time, but other output options became available. Bell Telephone Laboratories, for example, had a high-resolution photoplotter. The integrated circuit industry left Rubylith behind for technologies that were more efficient.

Certain digital image editing programs that have masking features may use a red overlay to designate masked areas, mimicking the use of actual Rubylith film.

== Manufacturing ==
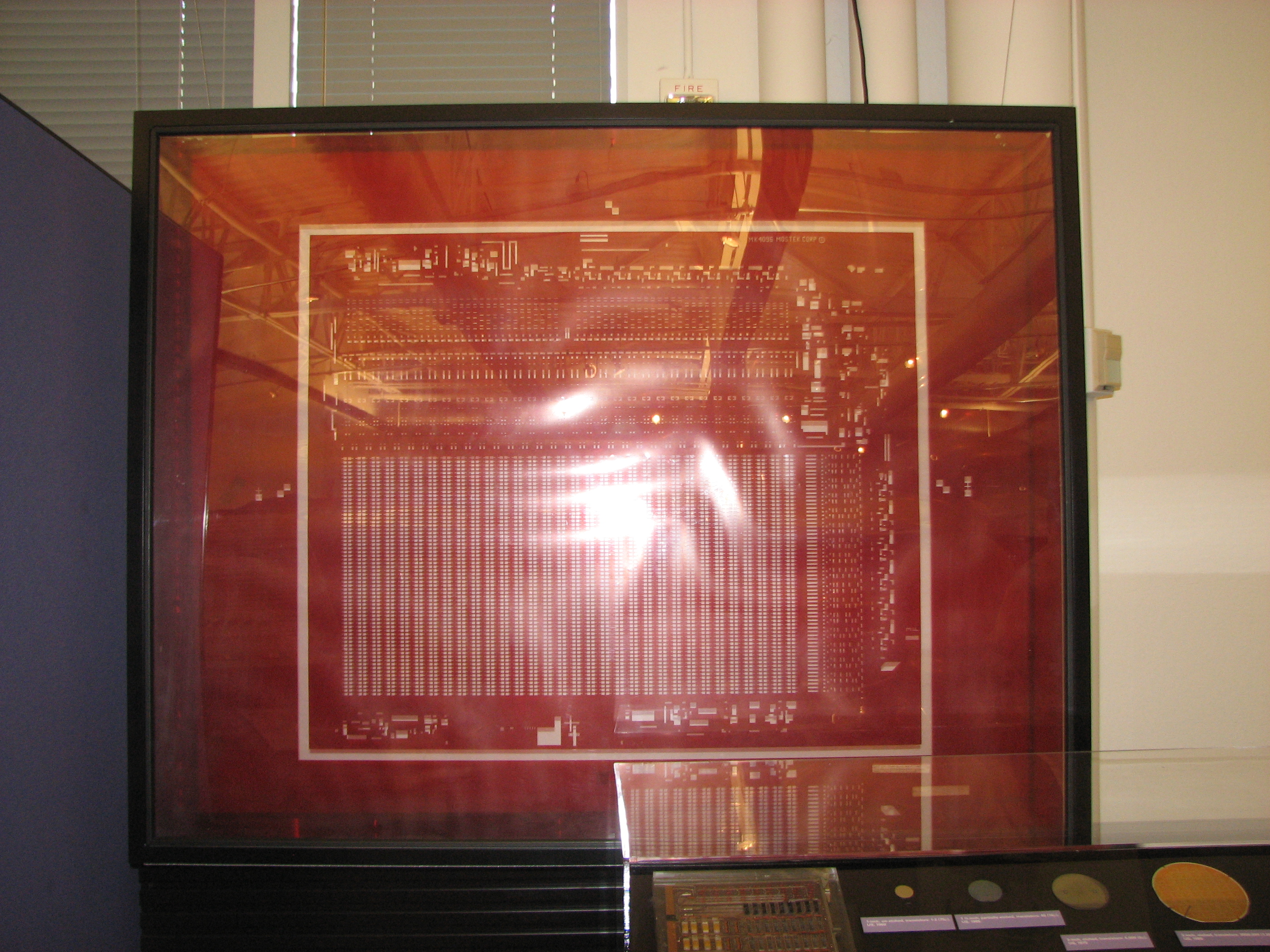
Rubylith tracing of an integrated circuit.

Intel
For about ten years since 1968 engineers at Intel used manually drawn rubylith schematics to produce its first line of products: SRAM, DRAM, and EPROM memory; notable chips produced by using rubylith include:

- Intel 3101, first Intel product, a SRAM device
- Intel 4004 (Note: Masatoshi Shima was behind the chip implementation.)
- Intel 8008 (née 1201)
- Intel 8080
- Intel 8085
- Intel 8086

Zilog

- Z80 (Note: By several accounts.)

MOS Technology

- MOS 6502 (layout by Bill Mensch)

== See also ==
- Now the Chips Are Down
