= Alice Ricciardi-von Platen =

Italian Physician and Psychoanalyst

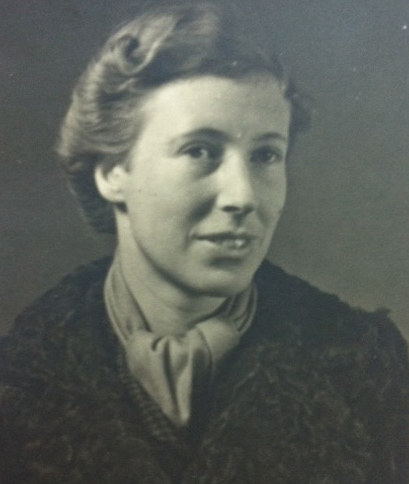
- Born: Alice von Platen-Hallermund; April 28, 1910; Weissenhaus, Germany
- Died: February 23, 2008 (aged 97); Cortona, Italy
- Known for: Doctor and historian

Alice Ricciardi von Platen (April 28, 1910 – February 23, 2008), born Alice von Platen-Hallermund, was an Italian physician and psychoanalyst of German descent. She is best known as the author of Nazism and euthanasia of the mentally ill in Germany (Die Tötung Geisteskranker in German), the world's first documentary about the mass-murder of disabled and mentally ill persons by the Nazi regime. For a few years before World War II, and permanently beginning in 1967, she lived in Italy, where in the 1970s she was one of the first group analysts.

== Life and work ==
Alice Ricciardi-von Platen was the youngest of the four daughters of Count Carl von Platen-Hallermund (1870–1919) and Elizabeth Alten (1875–1970); she grew up on the Weissenhaus estate in Schleswig-Holstein. Her father died early. She attended the boarding school Schule Schloss Salem, which was then under the leadership of Kurt Hahn. After completing her medical studies in Munich in 1934 and a subsequent clinical internship in a Berlin children's hospital, she spent the years 1936-39 in Florence and 1940 in Rome. She then returned to Germany, where her son George was born in 1941 and practised until early 1944 as a supply doctor in Bavaria, and until 1945 as a country doctor in Austria. In that role, she was confronted with the Nazi involuntary euthanasia program via accounts from her patients' relations, but she could save only a few patients. After the war, she worked as a volunteer at the psychosomatic clinic of the Heidelberg University, with Viktor von Weizsäcker, where she continued her training in psychotherapy. From December 1946 she was an official observer of the Nuremberg doctors' trial, and in 1947 she also attended the Hadamar trial (regarding Hadamar Killing Facility) in Frankfurt am Main in an unofficial capacity. Later in that year she joined professor Zillich at the mental hospital St. Getreu in Bamberg.

In 1949 Ricciardi-von Platen moved to London, where she worked – under the supervision of Michael Balint – in a psychotherapy and marriage counselling centre, and also in a psychiatric hospital. She completed her psychoanalytic and group analytic training and became a member of the Group Analytic Society. Subsequently, she worked at the Tavistock Clinic and the Bexley Hospital, eventually setting up her own psychiatry practice in England. She met the organizational consultant Augusto Baron Ricciardi (1915–1982), whom she married in 1956 and whom she accompanied to Belgium and Libya. From 1967 until her death in 2008 she lived and worked as a psychoanalyst in Rome and in Cortona (Tuscany).

== Observer at the Nuremberg Doctors' Trial ==
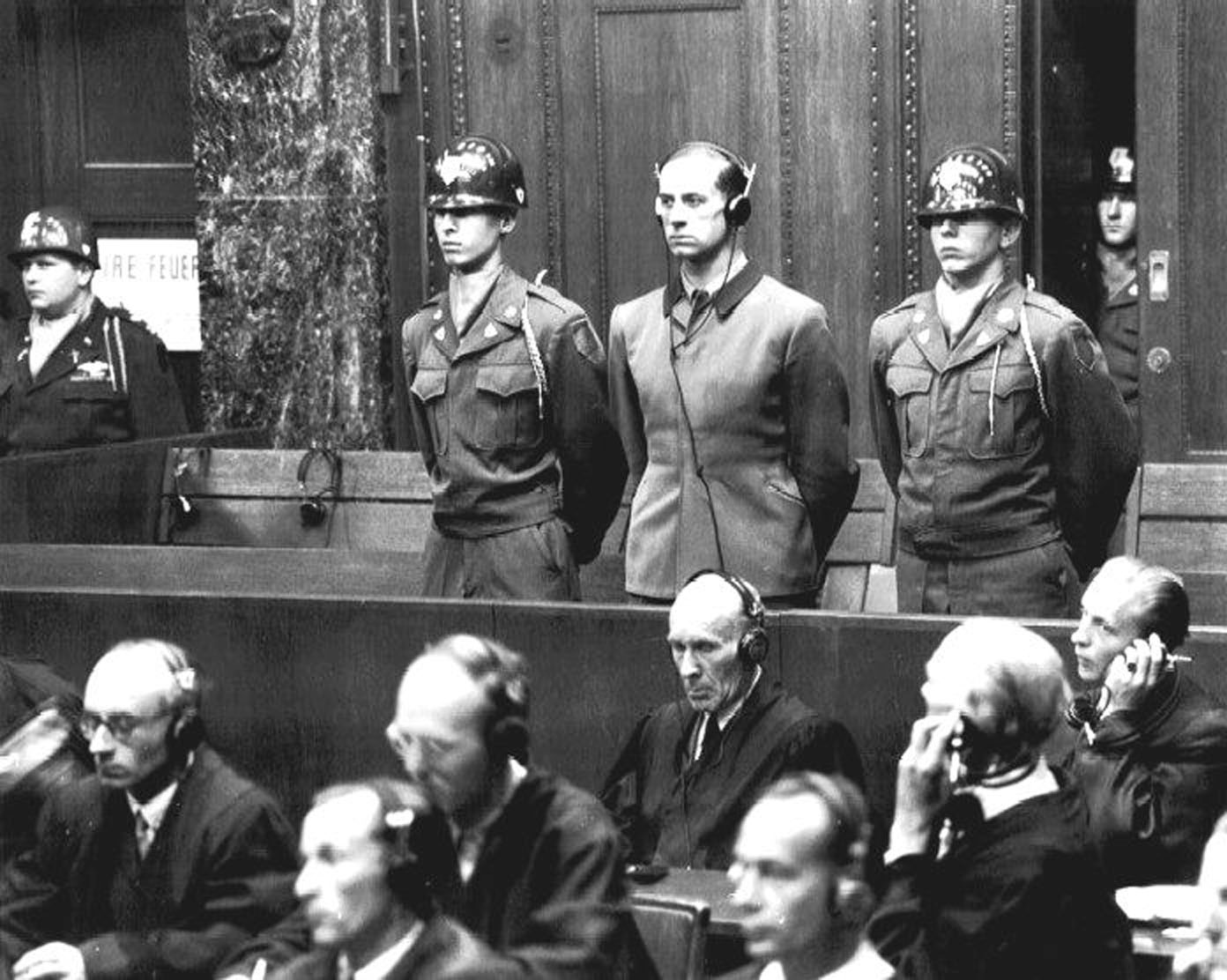
A sentence of death by hanging is pronounced by a U.S. War Crimes Tribunal upon Adolf Hitler's personal physician, 43-year-old Karl Brandt. Brandt was also Reich Commissar for Health and Sanitation.

Ricciardi-von Platen gained international attention as observer at the Nuremberg Doctors' Trial. When the American military government in 1946 announced that they would prosecute the perpetrators of the inhumane experiments on humans and of the deaths of about one hundred thousand mentally ill in order to hold to account those doctors who were responsible, the German Medical Association sent to Nuremberg a committee of observers headed by Alexander Mitscherlich. While Mitscherlich was focused primarily on the human experiments and on legal and political questions of the process, Alice von Platen-Hallermund was focused primarily on the "euthanasia" of psychiatric patients. She felt that the killing of mentally ill people was a systematic crime which the entire German medical establishment had known about and in which it was deeply involved.

== Nazism and euthanasia of the mentally ill in Germany ==
Ricciardi-von Platen's book Nazism and euthanasia of the mentally ill in Germany (Die Tötung Geisteskranker in German), published in 1948, addressed the complicity of German physicians in the Nazi euthanasia crimes. It was generally ignored at the time.

Reflecting in 1993, Ricciardi-von Platen said, regarding the mood of the population of Nuremberg (as cited by Helmut Sörgel in the Nürnberger Zeitung of April 29, 2000):

The people of Nuremberg didn't want to hear about the Doctors' Trial as in their view the doctors were not the ones who had perpetrated the crimes. There was a hatred of non-Nazis, socialists and expatriates. [...] It was devastating.

In March 1947, the observers Alexander Mitscherlich and Fred Mielcke wrote a document entitled The Dictatorship of Human Contempt (Das Diktat der Menschenverachtung) which was published as a newly edited and extended book in April 1960 under the title Medicine without humanity ("Medizin ohne Menschlichkeit"). Of the three thousand copies printed of Alice's book, only about 20 still exist in libraries.

== Publications ==
Alice von Platen-Hallermund: Die Tötung Geisteskranker in Deutschland. Aus der Deutschen Ärztekommission beim Amerikanischen Militärgericht. (Trans: The killing of the mentally ill in Germany. From the German Medical Commission at the American military court) Frankfurter Hefte, Frankfurt/Main 1948.

New edition 1993: Psychiatrie-Verlag, ISBN 3-88414-149-X.
New edition 2005: Mabuse Verlag, ISBN 3-935964-86-2.
