= Gridnik =

Geometric sans-serif typeface

- Category: Sans serif
- Classification: Geometric
- Designer(s): Wim Crouwel
- Foundry: Olivetti
- Date created: 1974
- Re-issuing foundries: The Foundry

Gridnik is a geometrical sans serif typeface designed by Dutch graphic designer Wim Crouwel in 1974. It is the digital version of the typewriter typeface Olivetti Politene.

== History ==
Around 1974, Crouwel was commissioned by typewriter manufacturer Olivetti to design a typeface for their new electric typewriters. The result was a sans serif monoline (all lines are of equal thickness) typeface. Olivetti called it Politene. All characters are based on a square grid, with the 45-degree corners. Before Crouwel could finish the design, the interest for electric typewriters declined, so much so that they did not need the type design anymore. As a consequence, the copyrights of the design went back to Crouwel. At the same time they commissioned Crouwel, they asked Josef Müller-Brockmann to design a typeface as well.

== Number Postage Stamps ==
The most notable use of Gridnik was on a series of Number Postage Stamps for the Dutch PTT, designed in the same period as the Olivetti commission. He drew a special version of Politene, consisting of the word nederland and the numerals. These stamps were in circulation from 1976 to 2002.

== Digital Gridnik ==
The digital version of Gridnik was digitized from the original drawings by the type foundry The Foundry in London. Originally, it only consisted of one font – as part of the Architype 3 Crouwel collection – but it was later expanded with a light a medium and a bold. This version is called Foundry Gridnik. The name Gridnik was chosen by The Foundry because of the nickname given to Crouwel by his friends, Mr. Gridnik, for his frequent use of grids in his designs. Other typefaces in the Architype 3 Crouwel collection are Architype Fodor, Architype New Alphabet, Architype Stedelijk and Architype Catalogue.

=== Other typefaces by Crouwel ===
- Fodor
- New Alphabet
