= Schule Schloss Salem =

Coordinates: 47°46′34″N 9°16′38″E

Location
- Schlossbezirk 1; 88682 Salem; Germany

Information
- School type: Private school
- Founded: 1920
- Headmaster: Bernd Westermeyer
- Grades: 5–12 (Abitur), 11–12 (IB)
- Enrollment: 600
- Language: German, English
- Colours: Blue, White
- Alumni: Altsalemer (Old Salems)
- Website: schule-schloss-salem.de

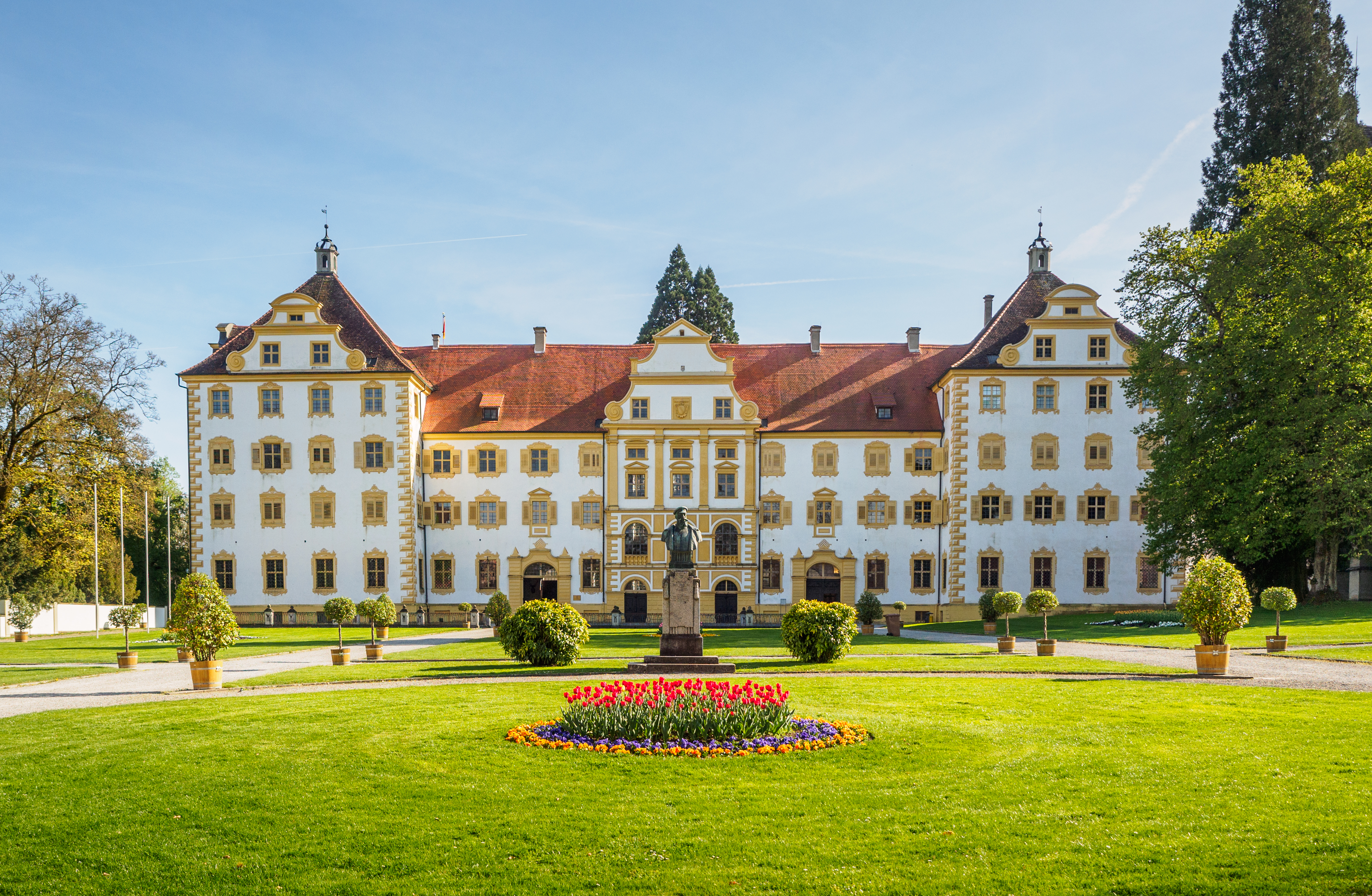
Salem Castle

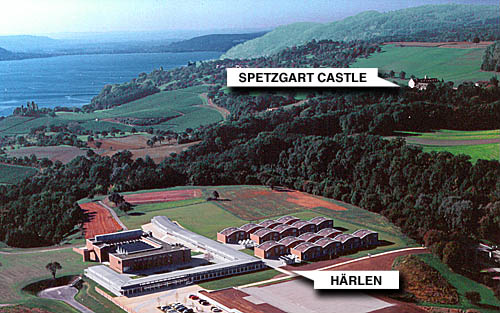
Spetzgart Castle and Härlen

Schule Schloss Salem (Anglicisation: School of Salem Castle) is a private boarding school with campuses at Salem and Überlingen in Baden-Württemberg, Southern Germany.

It offers the German Abitur and the International Baccalaureate (IB). With service-oriented programs like a fire brigade and a THW (Technical Support Organisation), the school seeks to offer education on a social as well as an academic level.

The school was established in 1920 by educator Kurt Hahn with the support of Prince Maximilian of Baden, and it was co-educational from the start. During the period of the Third Reich, Hahn, who was Jewish, was forced to emigrate to Scotland, where he founded the British Salem School of Gordonstoun and subsequently the Outward Bound organisation and the United World Colleges.

== The school today ==
Instruction in the first years takes place in German. From Year 8 onward, Salem is fully bilingual and offers a dual curriculum. Students may either continue in the German system (Abitur) or enter the international classes and the IB Diploma Programme, in which the primary language of instruction is English. Most students are of German background, but there are a significant number of international students, with students attending from countries such as Switzerland, Spain, US, China, Russia, Korea, India, Canada, Australia and Italy.

All students in the upper years must engage in community service at least one afternoon per week. All students must also participate in a regular program of sports and/or outdoor pursuits. Participation in the arts is strongly encouraged.

Far more than in boarding schools from the Anglo-American tradition, everyday responsibilities are placed in the hands of students under the guidance of staff. Many activities are led by students elected by their peers.

In 2013 the one-year interdisciplinary Salem Kolleg was opened in Überlingen; it is a studium generale programme seeking to prepare high school graduates for their academic and professional future through an orientation year of classes, career counseling, personal assessment, and outdoor leadership courses. The programme shares many of the Salem facilities.

Approximately one-third of pupils receive financial aid through various scholarship programmes.

== Campuses ==
Salem is spread among three separate campuses: the Lower School (grades 5 to 7) and the Middle School in Salem Castle (grades 8 to 11, and Pre-IB). The Upper (secondary) School is in Spetzgart Castle – along the shores of Lake Constance – and the new campus of Härlen (Grades 11 and 12, IB years 1 and 2). Salem Castle is located in a former Cistercian monastery, which prior to secularisation in 1802–1803 was known as Salem Abbey, in the town of Salem.

In 2024, Architectural Digest named the school one of the "World's 9 Most Beautiful Boarding Schools."

== Notable alumni ==
- Cleo von Adelsheim (born 1987), actress and hereditary princess of Oettingen-Spielberg
- Prince Philip, Duke of Edinburgh (1921–2021)
- Queen Sofía of Spain
- Princess Irene of Greece and Denmark, daughter of King Paul I of Greece and Princess Frederica of Hanover
- Inaara Aga Khan (as Gabriele Thyssen)
- Berthold Maria Schenk Graf von Stauffenberg (born 1934), major general
- Alice Ricciardi-von Platen (1910–2008), psychoanalyst and author
- Golo Mann (1909–1994), writer and son of Thomas Mann
- Monika Mann (1910–1992), writer and daughter of Thomas Mann
- George Mosse (1918–1999), historian
- Elisabeth Noelle-Neumann (1916–2010), political scientist
- Ferdinand, Prince of Bismarck (1930–2019), head of the princely house of Bismarck
- Brian Simon (1915–2002), historian
- Patrice Bart-Williams (born 1979), reggae singer
- Ekkehard von Kuenssberg CBE (1913–2001), former president of the Royal College of General Practitioners, Scotland
- Christian Kracht (born 1966), writer
- Hans-Ulrich von Oertzen (1915–1944), major and would-be Hitler assassin
- Rudolf August Oetker (1916–2007), heir to the Oetker fortune
- Eric "Winkle" Brown (1919–2016), pilot
