= New Alphabet =

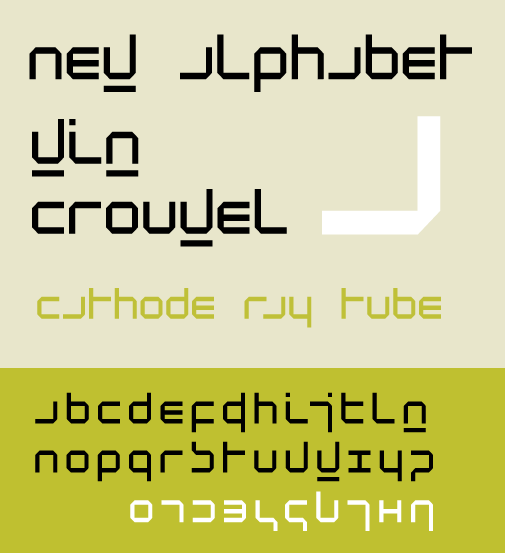
- Category: Sans serif
- Designer: Wim Crouwel
- Date created: 1967
- Re-issuing foundries: Photoscript, The Foundry

New Alphabet is a parametric typeface designed by Wim Crouwel, released in 1967. It embraced the limitations of the display technology that it was displayed on by only using horizontal and vertical strokes. This meant that some of the letters had little resemblance to the letters they were supposed to represent. New Alphabet was notably used on the cover of Joy Division's 1988 compilation album Substance.

== History ==
New Alphabet was a personal, experimental project of Crouwel. The typeface was designed to embrace the limitations of the cathode ray tube technology used by early data display screens and phototypesetting equipment, and thus only contains horizontal and vertical strokes. Conventional typefaces can suffer under these limitations, because the level of detail is not high enough, restricting legibility. Crouwel wanted to adapt his design to work for the new technologies, instead of adapting the technologies to meet the design. Since his letter shapes only contain horizontals and verticals, some of the glyphs are unconventional, while others bear virtually no resemblance to any version of the letters they represent (in some examples, the frequently appearing a glyph looks like a J, K looks like a t, numeral 1 resembles a 7, numeral 8 resembles capital H, and the x glyph looks like a capital I). Because of this, the typeface was received with mixed feelings by his peers.

Most of the letters are based on a grid of 5 by 7 units, with 45-degree corners. Each glyph is represented by two or more sides of a square, with ascenders, descenders or tittles added where necessary. Glyphs with three horizontal bars (E, 3) are represented faithfully, while those with three vertical bars (M, W) are not, instead being represented by underlined N and V glyphs respectively. To differentiate between uppercase and lowercase glyphs, uppercase letters are added with an extra horizontal line at the top of a lowercase letter.

Many of Crouwel's peers were of the opinion that the design was too experimental and that it went too far. The typeface received a lot of newspaper coverage, which sparked a lively debate over typefaces as an art form, compared to their practicality in everyday use. Crouwel largely agreed with the criticism and noted that it was mostly an exercise in theory, stating in 2009: "The New Alphabet was over-the-top and never meant to be really used. It was unreadable."

New Alphabet was one of 23 digital typefaces acquired by the Museum of Modern Art in January 2011 for its Architecture and Design Collection. This collection of typefaces were some of the first acquired by MoMA, and were on display in a 2011–2012 exhibition called Standard Deviations: Types and Families in Contemporary Design, or Standard Deviations.

== Usage ==
New Alphabet was featured on the album cover for Joy Division's 1988 compilation album Substance, where the album title is spelled out with characters corresponding to "subst1mce". Brett Wickens, who contributed to the cover, claimed this was for aesthetic reasons. The 1991 album reissue featured different artwork, although in the same style: the word "substance" was not spelled out; rather, the artwork featured a large green "S" in the New Alphabet typeface.

== Digital New Alphabet ==
New Alphabet was digitized in 1996 by Freda Sack and David Quay from The Foundry in London. It is part of the Architype 3 Crouwel Collection, and it consists of three weights. The original concept wasn't limited to three weights, but was intended as a parametric system, giving the possibly to make many different shapes by changing the parameters in the machine.

In 2015, Joshua Koomen developed, based on the original instructions, a digital version of New Alphabet in the form of a web-app. The application enables the user to produce any possible setting for the New Alphabet.

=== Other typefaces by Crouwel ===
Other typefaces designed by Crouwel in the same collection are Architype Gridnik, Architype Fodor, Architype Stedelijk and Architype Catalogue.

- Gridnik
- Fodor

== See also ==
- Seven-segment display
