= Sipplingen =

- Municipality
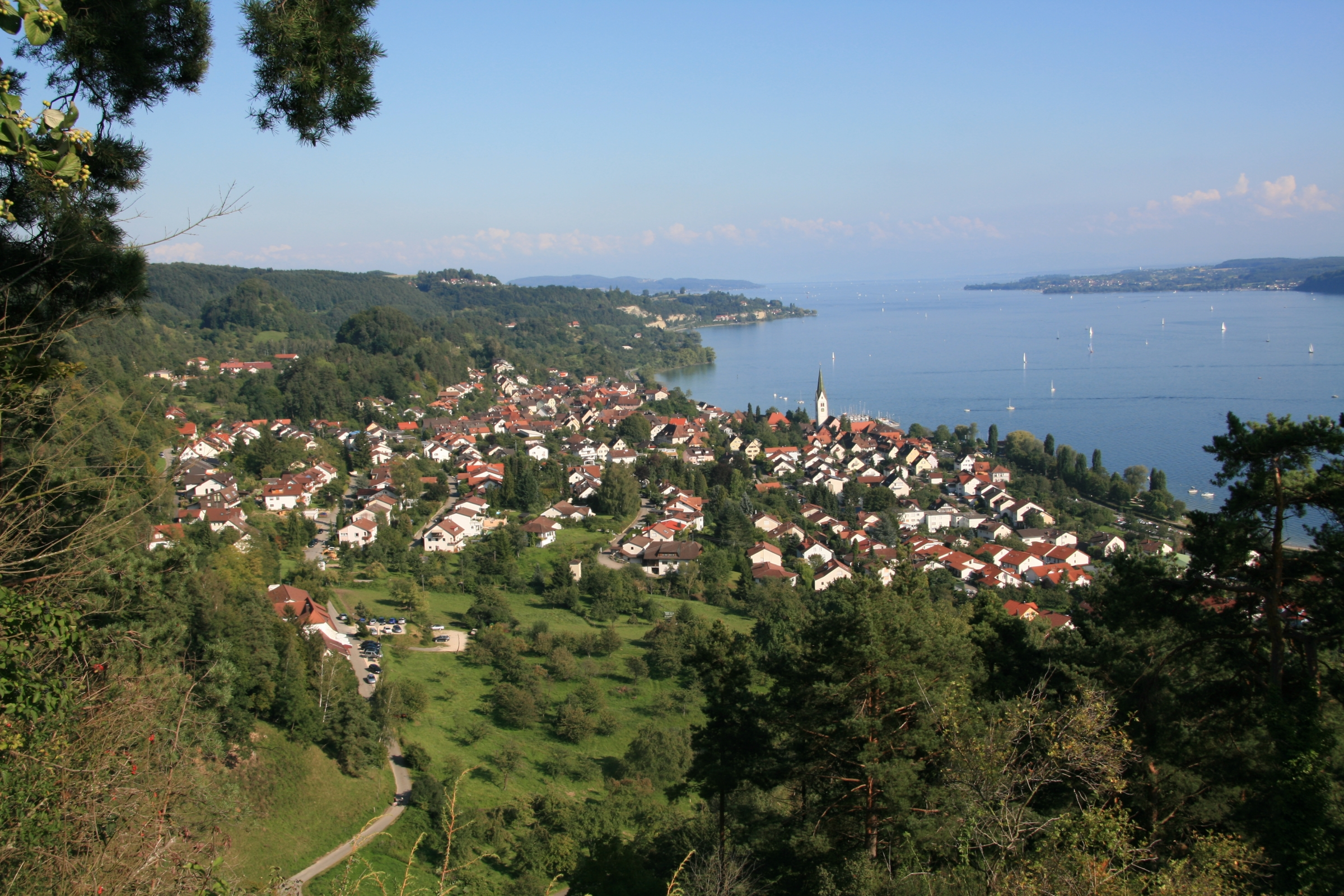
- Northwestern view of Sipplingen

- Coat of arms

- Location of Sipplingen within Bodenseekreis district
- Interactive map of Sipplingen
- Location within Germany Location within Baden-Württemberg
- Coordinates: 47°47′45″N 09°05′45″E
- Country: Germany
- State: Baden-Württemberg
- Admin. region: Tübingen
- District: Bodenseekreis

Government
  - Mayor (2017–25): Oliver Gortat

Area
  - Total: 4.28 km^{2} (1.65 sq mi)
- Elevation: 406 m (1,332 ft)

Population (2025-12-31)
  - Total: 2,047
  - Density: 478/km^{2} (1,240/sq mi)
- Time zone: UTC+01:00 (CET)
  - Summer (DST): UTC+02:00 (CEST)
- Postal codes: 78354
- Dialling codes: 07551
- Vehicle registration: FN
- Website: www.sipplingen.de

Sipplingen is a municipality in the district of Bodensee in Baden-Württemberg in Germany.

== World Heritage Site ==
It is home to one or more prehistoric pile-dwelling (or stilt house) settlements that are part of the Prehistoric Pile dwellings around the Alps UNESCO World Heritage Site.
