= Freda Sack =

British type designer

Freda Sack (born 23 September 1951, died 13 February 2019) was a British type designer who began her career at Letraset in 1972, joining as a photographic retoucher. Colleagues attest to her skill at cutting letters from rubylith at Letraset where she cut several of the in-house designs and some of her own. After a freelance period which including consulting for British Airways, and Vauxhall Motors, in 1989 she joined up with previous collaborator David Quay to co-found what, by their own account, may have been the first UK independent type foundry, called The Foundry, in 1989.

Freda Sack was a member of the International Society of Typographic Designers, its co-chair from 1995 to 1999, its chair from 2000 to 2004, and its president from 2006 to 2010. Later, she was made an honorary fellow.

== Typefaces by Sack ==
This is a selection of more notable typefaces, not a comprehensive index.

While employed by Letraset:

- Paddington (1977)
- Victorian (1976) (with Colin Brignall)

After leaving Letraset but still published with Letraset:

- Ignatius (1987)
- Proteus (1983)
- Vermont (1987)
- Waldorf (1986)

Published by her own Foundry Types (now The Foundry Types) many of which are careful revivals of 20th century designs:

- Architype Renner (1993) (described by Bringhurst as “artistically the earliest version” of Futura)
- New Alphabet (1997)
- Gridnik (1997).

Also at Foundry Types, Sack created corporate (that is, not published) fonts for British Gas, NatWest Bank, the Science Museum, the World Wildlife Fund, and Lisbon Metro.
