= 1918 in art =

Events from the year 1918 in art.

== Events ==
- February – British War Memorials Committee formed to commission artworks to create a memorial to the World War I, including a (never-built) Hall of Remembrance.
- February 16 – Joan Miró's first solo exhibition opens at the Galeries Dalmau; his work is ridiculed and defaced.
- March – C. R. W. Nevinson has an exhibition at the Leicester Galleries in London. His war painting Paths of Glory, condemned by the British Army censor for its depiction of dead soldiers, is displayed by the artist with a brown paper strip across the bodies bearing the word "Censored" and subsequently replaced in the exhibition by a painting of a tank.
- May – Stanley Spencer, a serving British Army soldier, is appointed as an official war artist. A similar appointment is made this year for Australian soldier Frank R. Crozier.
- May 3 – William Orpen's exhibition War opens in London; the paintings are donated to the British government. He is knighted in June.
- May 11 – Paul Nash's exhibition The Void of War opens at the Leicester Galleries in London.
- June 18 – Pablo Picasso marries Olga Khoklova.
- June – Alfred Stieglitz begins nude photography of Georgia O'Keeffe.
- October 15 – Kunsthalle Bern opens.
- November 3 – The Robespierre Monument (Moscow), designed by Beatrice Yuryevna Sandomierz, is unveiled; it collapses four days later.
- November 7–December 14 – British painter Colin Gill, having previously served as a soldier on the Western Front, returns to France to work for the British War Memorials Committee.
- December 3 – The November Group (Novembergruppe) of expressionist artists is formed in Germany, and shortly afterwards merges with the Arbeitsrat für Kunst.
- Frans Masereel's wordless novel 25 Images of a Man's Passion is published.

== Works ==
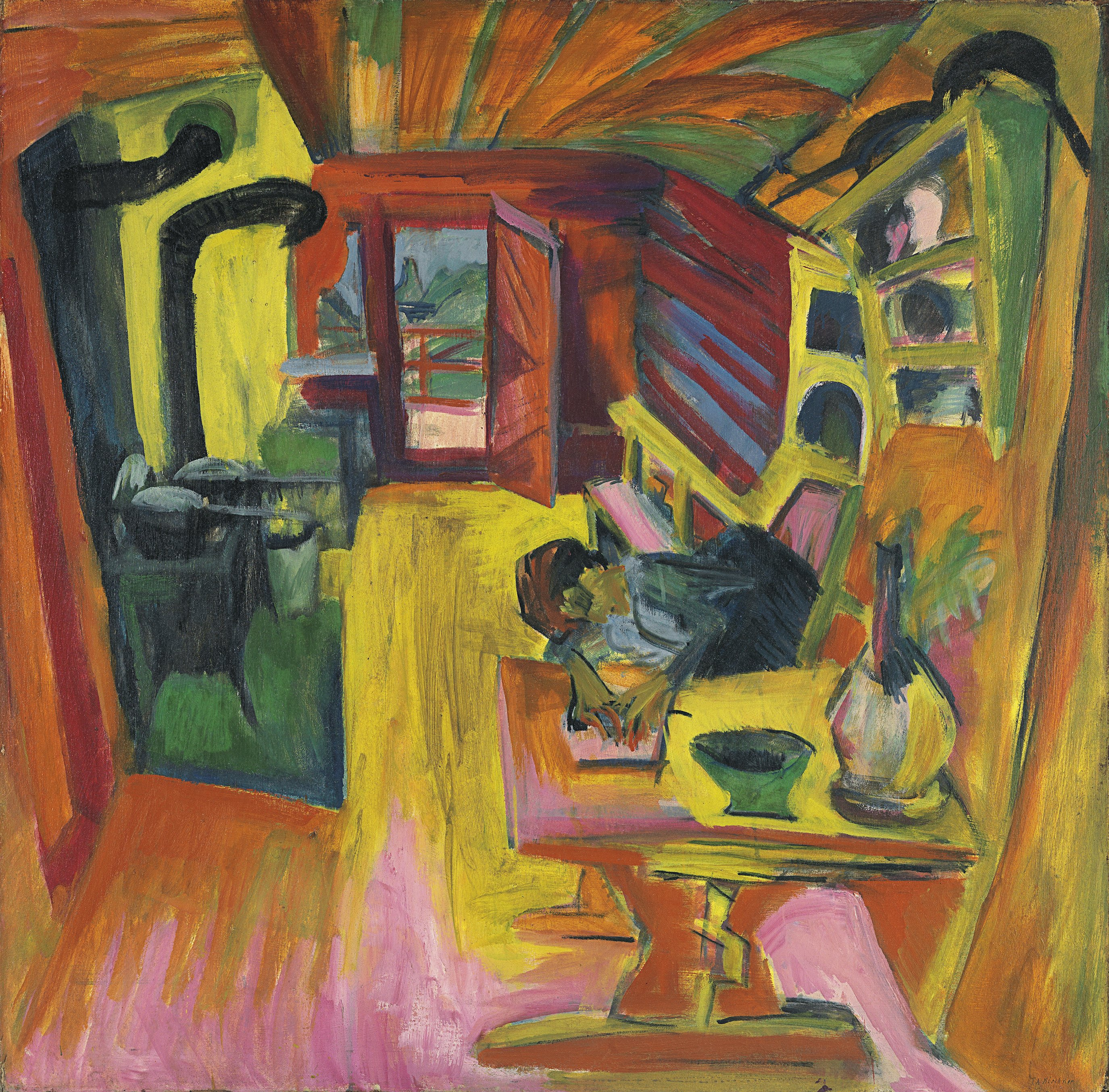
Ernst Ludwig Kirchner – Alpine Kitchen

John Nash – Over The Top (IWM)

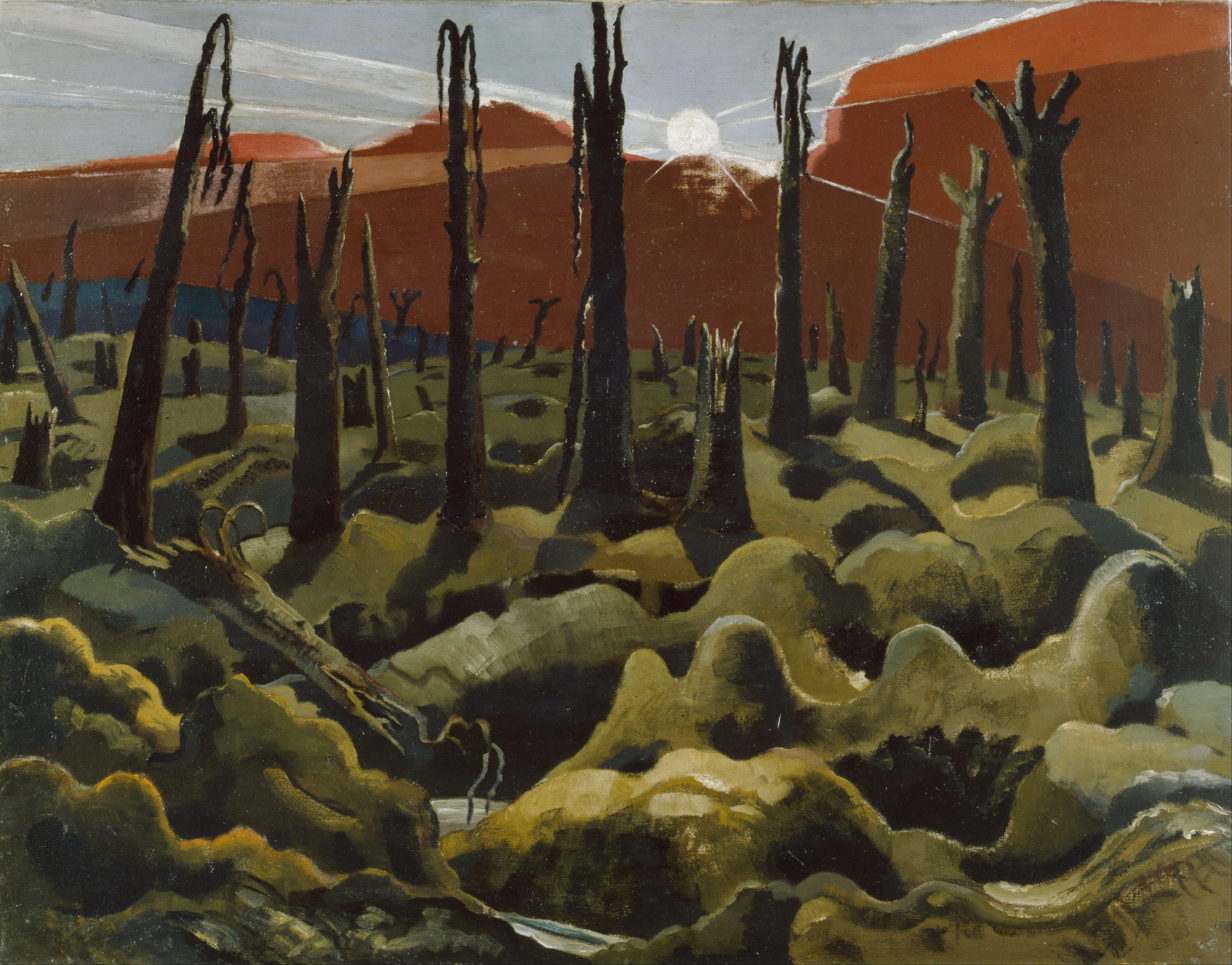
Paul Nash – We are Making a New World (IWM)

- Anna Airy
  - An Aircraft Assembly Shop, Hendon
  - The 'L' Press: Forging the Jacket of an 18-inch Gun, Armstrong-Whitworth Works, Openshaw
  - A Shell Forge at a National Projectile Factory, Hackney Marshes, London
  - Shop for Machining 15-inch Shells: Singer Manufacturing Company, Clydebank, Glasgow
  - Women Working in a Gas Retort House: South Metropolitan Gas Company, London
- George Bellows
  - The Barricade
  - Dawn of Peace
  - Edith Cavell
- Victor David Brenner – Mary Schenley Memorial Fountain (Pittsburgh)
- Charles Buchel – Radclyffe Hall
- George Clausen – In the Gun Factory at Woolwich Arsenal
- Charles Demuth – Turkish Bath with self-portrait
- Theo van Doesburg – Composition IX
- Katherine Sophie Dreier – Abstract Portrait of Marcel Duchamp
- Eric Enstrom – Grace (photograph)
- Charles Buckles Falls – Books Wanted (poster)
- Stanhope Forbes – The Munitions Girls
- Roger Fry
  - Nina Hamnett
  - Self-portrait
- Georges Gardet – Eternal Youth (gilded sculpture on Manitoba Legislative Building)
- Mark Gertler – The Pool at Garsington
- J. W. Godward
  - A Fond Farewell
  - Sweet Sounds
- Duncan Grant – The White Jug (finished version)
- George Grosz – The Funeral
- Eric Kennington – Gassed and Wounded
- Ernst Ludwig Kirchner
  - Alpine Kitchen
  - Self-portrait as a Patient
- Paul Klee
  - Composition with the Yellow Half-Moon and the Y
  - Flower Myth
- Boris Kustodiev
  - The Merchant's Wife
  - Sten'ka Razin
- John Lavery – A Convoy, North Sea
- Fernand Léger
  - Bargeman
  - In the Factory
- Wyndham Lewis – A Canadian Gun-Pit
- Flora Lion – Women's Canteen at Phoenix Works, Bradford
- John Hodgson Lobley
  - Outside Charing Cross Station, July 1916. Casualties from the Battle of the Somme arriving in London
  - The Queen's Hospital for Facial Injuries, Frognal, Sidcup: The Toy-Makers' Shop
- José Malhoa – Autumn
- Ivan Meštrović – Dr. Elsie Inglis (bronze bust)
- Jean Metzinger – Fruit and a Jug on a Table
- Joan Miró – La casa de la palmera (House with Palm Tree)
- Alfred Munnings
  - Draft Horses, Lumber Mill in the Forest of Dreux
  - Warrior
- Kaita Murayama – Self-portrait
- John Nash
  - The Cornfield
  - Oppy Wood, 1917, Evening
  - Over The Top
- Paul Nash
  - The Mule Track
  - Sunrise, Inverness Copse
  - We are Making a New World
  - Void
- Georgia O'Keeffe – The Flag
- William Orpen
  - Armistice Night, Amiens
  - Dead Germans in a Trench
  - The Mad Woman of Douai
  - Marshal Foch
  - Zonnebeke
- Willard Dryden Paddock – Sundial, Boy With Spider (bronze)
- Glyn Philpot
  - Italian Soldier (No. 2)
  - Sir James Murray
  - Admiral Viscount Jellicoe
  - Vice-Admiral Sir Roger Keyes
  - Admiral Sir F. C. D. Sturdee
  - Rear-Admiral Sir Reginald Tyrwhitt
- Pablo Picasso
  - Pierrot
  - Portrait of Olga in an Armchair
  - Still Life (1918)
- Lucien Pissarro – All Saints' Church, Hastings
- Pierre-Auguste Renoir
  - Portrait of Adele Besson
  - The Bathers
- William Roberts
  - The First German Gas Attack at Ypres
  - A Shell Dump, France
- Solomon Joseph Solomon – Nina Salaman
- William Strang – Lady with a Red Hat
- Henry Tonks – An Advanced Dressing Station in France
- Viktor Vasnetsov – Frog Princess
- Edward Wolfe – Still Life with Omega Cat
- Francis Derwent Wood – Canada's Golgotha (bronze)
- William Lionel Wyllie – Battle of the Falkland Islands, 1914

== Births ==
- 6 February – Lothar-Günther Buchheim, German author, painter and art collector (d. 2007).
- 7 February – Markey Robinson, Irish painter (d. 1999).
- 12 March – Elaine de Kooning, American abstract expressionist painter (d. 1989)
- 17 March – Herb Lubalin, American graphic designer and typographer (d. 1981).
- 22 March – Harry Devlin, American painter and illustrator (d. 2001).
- 10 April – Cornell Capa, Hungarian-American photographer and photo curator (d. 2008).
- 9 May – Kyffin Williams, Welsh landscape painter (d. 2006)
- 10 May – Desmond MacNamara, Irish painter, sculptor and author (d. 2008).
- 30 May – Károly Doncsecz, Slovenian potter (d. 2002)
- 2 July – Fumiko Hori, Japanese Nihonga painter (d. 2019).
- 11 July – Roy Krenkel, American illustrator (d. 1983).
- 21 July – David Piper, English curator and novelist (d. 1990).
- 25 July – Jane Frank, American painter, sculptor, mixed media and textile artist (d. 1986).
- 8 August – Brian Stonehouse, English painter, Special Operations Executive agent during World War II (d. 1998).
- 22 September – Cleve Gray, American abstract expressionist painter (d. 2004).
- 7 October – Mimmo Rotella, Italian décollage artist and poet (d. 2006).
- 8 November – Hermann Zapf, German typographer and calligrapher (d. 2015).
- 20 November – Corita Kent, American nun and silkscreen printer (d. 1986).
- 14 December – Jack Cole, American comic book artist (d. 1958).
- 18 December – Kali, born Hanna Gordziałkowska, Polish-born portrait painter, Resistance agent during World War II (d. 1998).

== Deaths ==
- January 7 – Rista Vukanović, Serbian Impressionist painter and husband of painter Beta Vukanović (b. 1873)
- February 6 – Gustav Klimt, Austrian Symbolist painter (b. 1862)
- April 9 – Niko Pirosmani, Georgian painter (b. 1862)
- April 1 – Isaac Rosenberg, English painter and poet (b. 1890)
- April 23 – Paul Sébillot, Breton painter and author (b. 1842)
- May 19 – Ferdinand Hodler, Swiss painter (b. 1853)
- June 28 – Albert Henry Munsell, American inventor of the Munsell color system (b. 1858)
- October 9 – Raymond Duchamp-Villon, French sculptor (b. 1876)
- October 30 – Egon Schiele, Austrian painter (b. 1890)
- November 20 – John Bauer, Swedish illustrator (in shipwreck) (b. 1882)
- December 22 – Charles Edward Perugini, English painter (b. 1839)
- December 23 – Thérèse Schwartze, Dutch portrait painter (b. 1851)
