= World War I armistice =

World War I armistice may refer to:

- Armistice of Focșani, signed 9 December 1917 between Romania and the Central Powers
- Armistice between Russia and the Central Powers, signed 15 December 1917
- Armistice of Erzincan, signed 18 December 1917 between the Ottoman Empire and Russia
- Armistice with Bulgaria, signed 29 September 1918 at Thessaloniki
- Armistice of Mudros, signed 30 October 1918 with the Ottoman Empire
- Armistice of Villa Giusti, signed 3 November 1918 between Italy and Austria-Hungary
- Armistice with Germany, signed 11 November 1918 at Compiègne
- Armistice of Belgrade, signed on 13 November 1918 between France and the First Hungarian Republic

== See also ==
- List of armistices
