= List of armistices involving Germany =

This is a list of armistices signed by the German Empire (1871–1918) or Nazi Germany (1933–1945). An armistice is a temporary agreement to cease hostilities. The period of an armistice may be used to negotiate a peace treaty.

- Armistice of Versailles (28 January 1871, came into effect fully by 31 January)

Signed with the Third French Republic, ended the Franco-Prussian War. A final peace, the Treaty of Frankfurt, was signed on 10 May 1871.

- Armistice of Focșani (9 December 1917)

Signed by Germany and its allies—Austria-Hungary, Bulgaria and the Ottoman Empire—with Romania during World War I. A final peace, the Treaty of Bucharest, was signed on 7 May 1918.

- Armistice between Russia and the Central Powers (15 December 1917)

Signed by Germany and its allies—Austria-Hungary, Bulgaria and the Ottoman Empire—with Soviet Russia after the Russian Revolution, ending the Eastern Front of World War I. The armistice came to an end on 18 February 1918, but the Treaty of Brest-Litovsk ending the state of war was signed on 3 March 1918.

- Armistice of Compiègne (11 November 1918)

Also called the Armistice of Rethondes. Signed between the German republic and the Allied and Associated Powers after the German Revolution, ending the Western Front of World War I. A final peace, the Treaty of Versailles, was signed on 28 June 1919.

- Armistice of Compiègne (22 June 1940, came into effect 25 June)

Also called the Armistice of Rethondes. Signed, at the same location as the previous, with France during World War II. No peace treaty was signed before the unconditional surrender of Germany and the establishment of the French Fourth Republic

- Armistice of Belgrade (17 April 1941, came into effect 18 April)

Signed with Yugoslavia during World War II and worded as an unconditional surrender. On account of its doubtful legality, no peace treaty was signed.

== See also ==
- List of armistices
- German Instrument of Surrender (7–9 May 1945), an unconditional surrender that ended the European theatre of World War II
