= Lobley =

Lobley may refer to:

== People ==
- Bill Lobley, American comic actor
- John Hodgson Lobley (1878-1954), English artist

== Places ==
- Lobley Hill
