= Type 0109 gunboat =

Chinese gunboat

Class overview
- Operators: People's Liberation Army Navy

General characteristics
- Type: Gunboat
- Displacement: 135 tonnes (133 long tons; 149 short tons)
- Length: 38.8 m (127 ft 4 in)
- Beam: 5.4 m (17 ft 9 in)
- Draft: 1.7 m (5 ft 7 in)
- Installed power: Internal combustion engine
- Propulsion: 2 × M50F-4 Diesel engine at 2,400 hp (1,790 kW); 2 × 12D4 Diesel engine at 1,820 hp (1,357 kW)
- Speed: 28.5 knots (52.8 km/h; 32.8 mph)
- Sensors & processing systems: 1 × navigational radar
- Armament: 2 × 57 mm (2.2 in) guns or; 2 × twin 37 mm (1.5 in) guns; 2 × twin25.4 mm (1.00 in) guns; 2 × mine/depth charge rails

Type 0109 gunboat was a type of gunboat developed by China for the People's Liberation Army Navy (PLAN) in the late 1950s, and has since retired.

In 1958, PLAN commander-in-chief of East Sea Fleet Vice admiral Tao Yong (陶勇) ordered Colonel Ma Qian (马千), the director of PLAN Shipbuilding and Repair Department (SRD) of the PLAN Headquarter (海军司令部修造部), to develop a new gunboat designated as Type 0109. The task was given to PLAN No 101 Factory (later renamed as 4805 Factory, the predecessor of current Shenjia Shipyard (申佳船厂). Designers included a group of young engineers and technicians, including Mr. Wang Zhao-Ji (王肇基), Mr. Lin Ke-Guang (林克光), Mr. Chen Yin-Geng (陈荫耕), Mr. Yang Zheng-Xin (杨正信), Mr. Zhuang Xu (庄煦), Mr. Zhang Liu-Gen (张留根), Mr. Gu Yong-Xin (顾永鑫), with Mr. Wang Zhao-Ji as the general designer. Drafters included Mr. Su Xiao-Ming (苏晓明) and Zhang Fu-Gen (张福根). Production went smoothly, a rather rare occasion in the political turmoil in China at the time, namely, the Great Leap Forward. By March 1959, the first boat was launched, with PLAN Vice Admiral Rao Shou-Shen (饶守坤) attending the launching ceremony. Sea trials confirmed the design had met all requirements, and by 1962, all 10 planned boats were completed. Type 0109 was one of the sources based on which Type 062 gunboat was developed from. Some of the Type 0109 were upgraded with a pair of 57 mm gun replacing the original twin 37 mm gun in the bow. Type 0109 has participated in numerous engagements with ROCN in the 1950s and 1960s.
