= The Flag (O'Keeffe painting) =

1918 painting by Georgia O'Keeffe

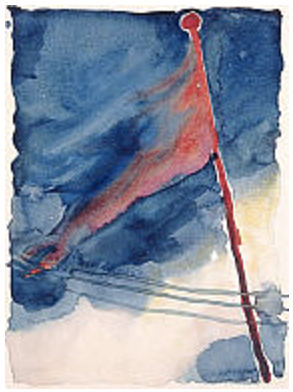
- Artist: Georgia O'Keeffe
- Year: 1918
- Medium: Watercolor on paper
- Dimensions: 30.3 cm × 22.4 cm (11 15/16 in × 8 13/16 in)
- Location: Milwaukee Art Museum, Milwaukee

The Flag is a watercolor painting executed in 1918 by Georgia O'Keeffe that represents her anxiety about her brother being sent to fight in Europe during World War I. The war was particularly controversial and dangerous because of its use of new modern weapons and tactics, like the machine gun, mustard gas, naval mines and torpedoes, high-powered artillery guns, and combat aircraft. The painting was first publicly displayed in 1968. It is in the collection of the Milwaukee Art Museum.

== Background ==
Everything seems to be whirling or unbalanced—I'm suspended in the air—can't get my feet on the ground... I should think going to war would be a great relief from this everlasting reading about it—thinking about it—hearing talk about it—whether one believed in it or not—it is a state that exists and experiencing it in reality seems preferable to the way we are all being soaked with it second hand—it is everywhere… it's all like a bad dream.

— Georgia O'Keeffe in a letter to Paul Strand.

In 1918, O'Keeffe was in a state of depression and anxiety about the war and did not paint for three months. While she understood why it was important militarily, she, like many Americans who initially opposed U.S. involvement, found it at odds with humanism and basic Christian beliefs. O'Keeffe's brother, Alexius or Alexis, was stationed in a military camp in Texas before he shipped out for Europe during World War I. She visited him there in the fall of 1917, and was anxious about his fate. He was one of the first soldiers sent to France and did not believe that he would return to the United States alive. In France war had become more dangerous as a result of chemical and technologically advanced weapons. Poisonous gases killed, blinded, and severely injured the troops. High-powered and long-range guns widened the destruction. Submarines planted mines in the seas and airplanes dropped bombs from the sky.

O’Keeffe found herself at odds with people in Canyon about the war and was discouraged by attempts to glorify it. She tried to persuade her male students to continue their education, rather than fight in the war and she also wanted authorities to create a course for young men about the reasons and causes of war before they engaged in battle. She created a stir when she asked a shop owner to remove Christmas cards from his shop that expressed anti-German sentiment. O'Keeffe became quite ill from influenza during the 1918 flu pandemic, which had killed an estimated 20 million people worldwide, and took a leave of absence from her teaching position at the West Texas State Normal College in early 1918 to recuperate at a friend's ranch in San Antonio, where she painted The Flag.

== Overview ==
The Flag, both a political statement and a reflection of her fears, is a red streak "bleeding into bruise-colored clouds". In December 1917, she wrote that she felt compelled for the first time to paint from a sense of necessity. Her image for the painting was of a flag floating in the wind, similar to a tremble. Biographer Roxana Robinson states, "O'Keeffe sets a drooping flag against a starless, darkening sky. The flag flutters limply, stripped of its stars and stripes; its only color, and that of the pole, is blood red." Alexis was severely gassed in France and eventually died from the effects.

Anti-war sentiment was criminalized with the Espionage Act of 1917, and people living in Canyon were uneasy due to her anti-war position. The Flag was in the private collection of Mrs. Harry Lynde Bradley in October 25, 1968, when it was part of a Milwaukee Art Museum exhibition, and was acquired by the museum in 1977. The painting was included in the "World War I and American Art" exhibition at the Pennsylvania Academy of the Fine Arts in January 2017 and was later displayed at the New-York Historical Society.
