= Dawn of Peace =

1918 painting by George Bellows

Dawn of Peace is a 1918 oil on canvas painting by the American artist George Bellows (1882–1925) commissioned by Lord Duveen for the American Red Cross both for their membership drive of that year and to celebrate the World War One Armistice. It was one of a set of two works commissioned for the occasion by the famed art dealer, the other being Hail to Peace.

In 1919 it was included in an exhibition of Bellows' work mounted by the Art Institute of Chicago.

In his essay "Uncivil War", published in Artforum, critic Donald Kuspit refers to the painting as "naively celebratory". It has been suggested that the inclusion of the nurse was influenced by a Red Cross poster campaign highlighting the increase in service of women with the international relief agency.

It is held in the permanent collection of the Allentown Art Museum in Allentown, Pennsylvania.
