= Composition IX =

Painting by Theo van Doesburg

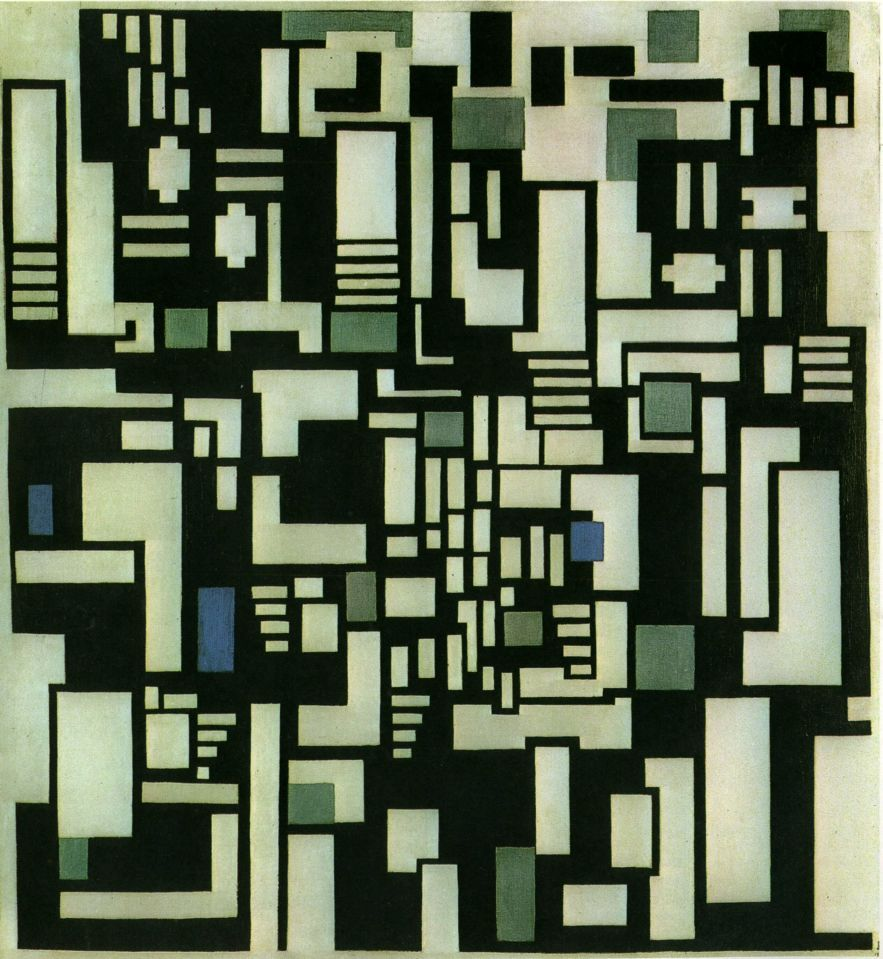
- Year: 1917
- Dimensions: 116 cm (46 in) × 106 cm (42 in)
- Location: Kunstmuseum Den Haag

Composition IX is a painting from one of the leaders of the De Stijl movement, Theo van Doesburg. The painting, completed in 1918, hangs in the Kunstmuseum, The Hague, Netherlands.

The work bears Van Doesburg's monogram and the year 1917 at the bottom right and is considered a 're-presentation' (a further abstraction) of an earlier work by Van Doesburg, Card Players, from 1916-17 (also hanging in the Kunstmuseum). During the creation of the painting, Van Doesburg's ideas about modern painting were, so it appears from the numerous writing he made in that year, still in development. In the same year, he established the journal bearing the name De Stijl with other members of the group it is said that Composition IX is inspired by the work of Vilmos Huszár, for examples his Composition with white head, and the reading man on the cover of De Stijl journal.

== Title ==
The work comes in a list of paintings that Van Doesburg around 1927 initially titled as Composition VIII 1917 (representation of card players) (in Dutch: Compositie VIII 1917 (doorbeelding der kaartspelers)). In nearly all the scholarly literature and exhibitions from 1920, the title Composition IX is used.

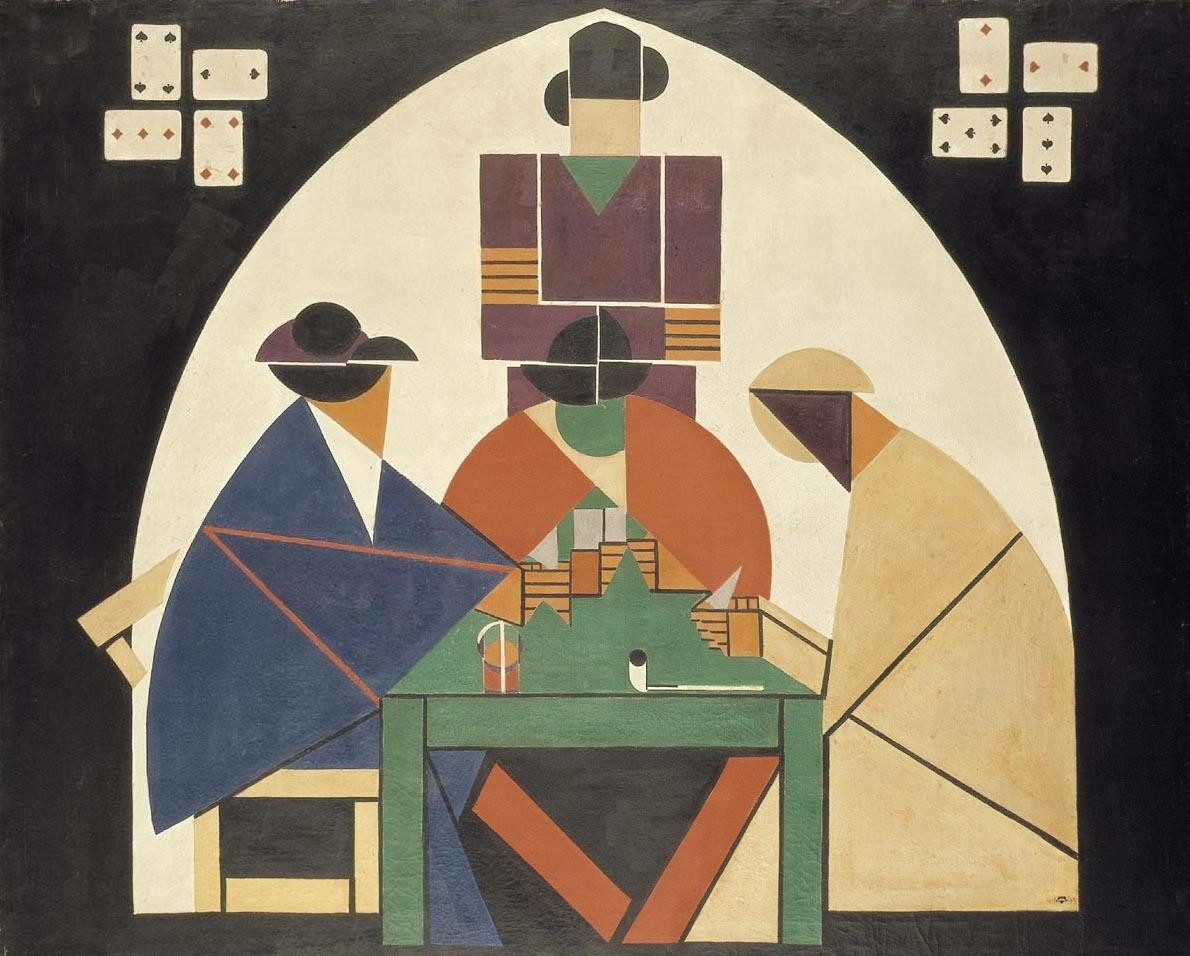
Theo van Doesburg. Card Players. 1916–1917.

== Provenance ==
The work was created while Van Doesburg lived in Leiden. He would take the painting as he moved, first to Paris and later to his joint studio/accommodation in Meudon. When Van Doesburg died in 1931, it came into the possession of his widow Nelly van Doesburg. She bequeathed it to the Kunstmuseum in the Hague (then known as the Gemeentemuseum) in 1935.

== Bibliography ==
- Anoniem (1 mei 1936) ‘Tentoonstelling Theo van Doesburg’, De Gooi- en Eemlander, p. 5.
- Baljeu, Joost (1974) Theo van Doesburg, London: Studio Vista.
- Fabre, Gladys, en Doris Wintgens Hötte (redactie; 2009) Van Doesburg & the international avant-garde. Constructing a new world, [London]: Tate Publishing, ISBN 978-1-85437-872-9, p. 247.
- Hoek, Els (redactie; 2000) Theo van Doesburg. Oeuvrecatalogus, Bussum: Uitgeverij Thot, ISBN 90-6868-255-5, cat. 556, pp. 204–206.
- Moorsel, Wies van (2000) ‘De doorsnee is mij niet genoeg’. Nelly van Doesburg. 1899-1975. Nijmegen: SUN, 2000: p. 217.
