= Alpine Kitchen =

Painting by Ernst Ludwig Kirchner

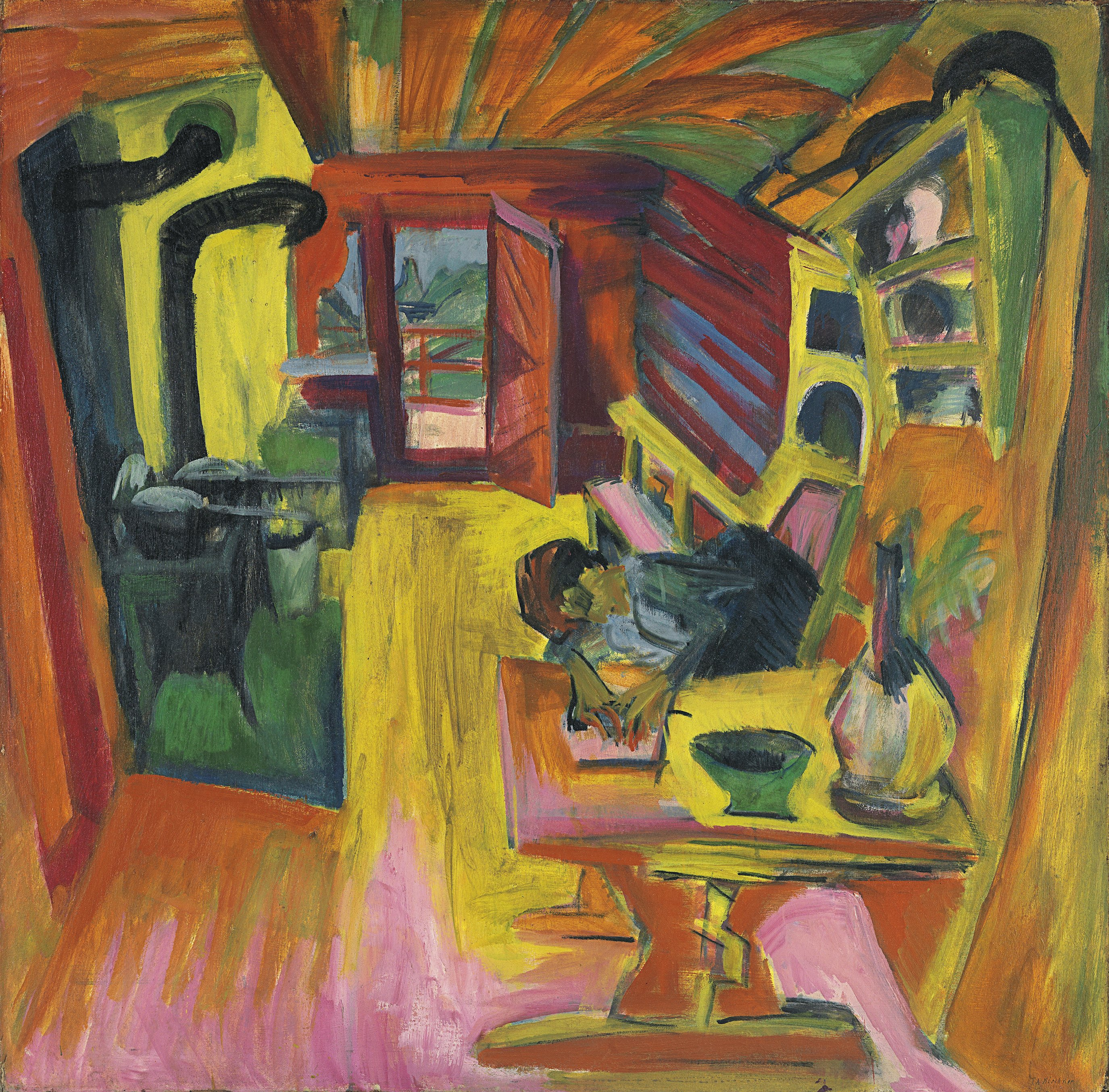
- Artist: Ernst Ludwig Kirchner
- Year: 1918
- Medium: Oil on canvas
- Dimensions: 121,5 cm × 121,5 cm (478 in × 478 in)
- Location: Thyssen-Bornemisza Museum, Madrid

Alpine Kitchen is an oil painting on canvas by German artist Ernst Ludwig Kirchner, executed in 1918. It was made when the painter was temporarily living in a mountain hut in the Alps, at 1900 meters of height, above Davos. The house still exists almost in his original form. The painting came from Kirchner's estate and today belongs to the collection of the Thyssen-Bornemisza Museum in Madrid.

== History and description ==
The painting has a square format with the dimensions of 121.5 by 121.5 cm. It is signed, with a small signature at the bottom right that reads EL Kirchner and on the back is the name KN-Da/Ad2. In Donald E. Gordon's catalog raisonné it bears the number 518. It was exhibited in Frankfurt/Main in 1922 and in Berlin in 1926.

The painting depicts a room with several households, in a rustic style. At the table, hunched over, sits a person who Roman Norbert Ketterer, Kirchner's estate administrator, but also Felix Krämer, assume is the artist himself working on a lithographic stone. The British art historian Peter Vergo, however, suspects that it is instead his partner Erna Schilling.

The view falls through the open door over the terrace, further over the other chalets of the Stafelalp and extends to the southwestern Tinzenhorn, which in this canvas forms the perspective vanishing point, and which often appears as a painterly motif in his Davos paintings.

Kirchner rented the small mountain hut from a local farmer and entered it for the first time in the early Summer of 1918. Much was still lacking in terms of furnishings and materials, but it was ready for artistic work. In June 1918 he wrote to his friend Henry van de Velde that "the rooms were very unusual, the cracks between the woods were stuffed with moss, and there was a 'beautiful pot-bellied stove' in the kitchen". The artist lived here in the summers of his first Davos years. After his traumatic experience at World War I, Kirchner felt healthy again and was able to paint. By the Christmas of 1918, however, he felt no longer able to continue working on the paintings he had begun.

The art historian Felix Krämer writes that in this painting, in contrast to earlier interior depictions of Kirchner where the figures "dominate their surroundings", there is a difference, because "here the space overlaps with its aligned lines and the strong luminosity of the colors the figure. (...) The room loses its protective function (...), which can be associated with the insecure psyche of the resident."
