= Armistice =

Formal agreement to stop fighting a war

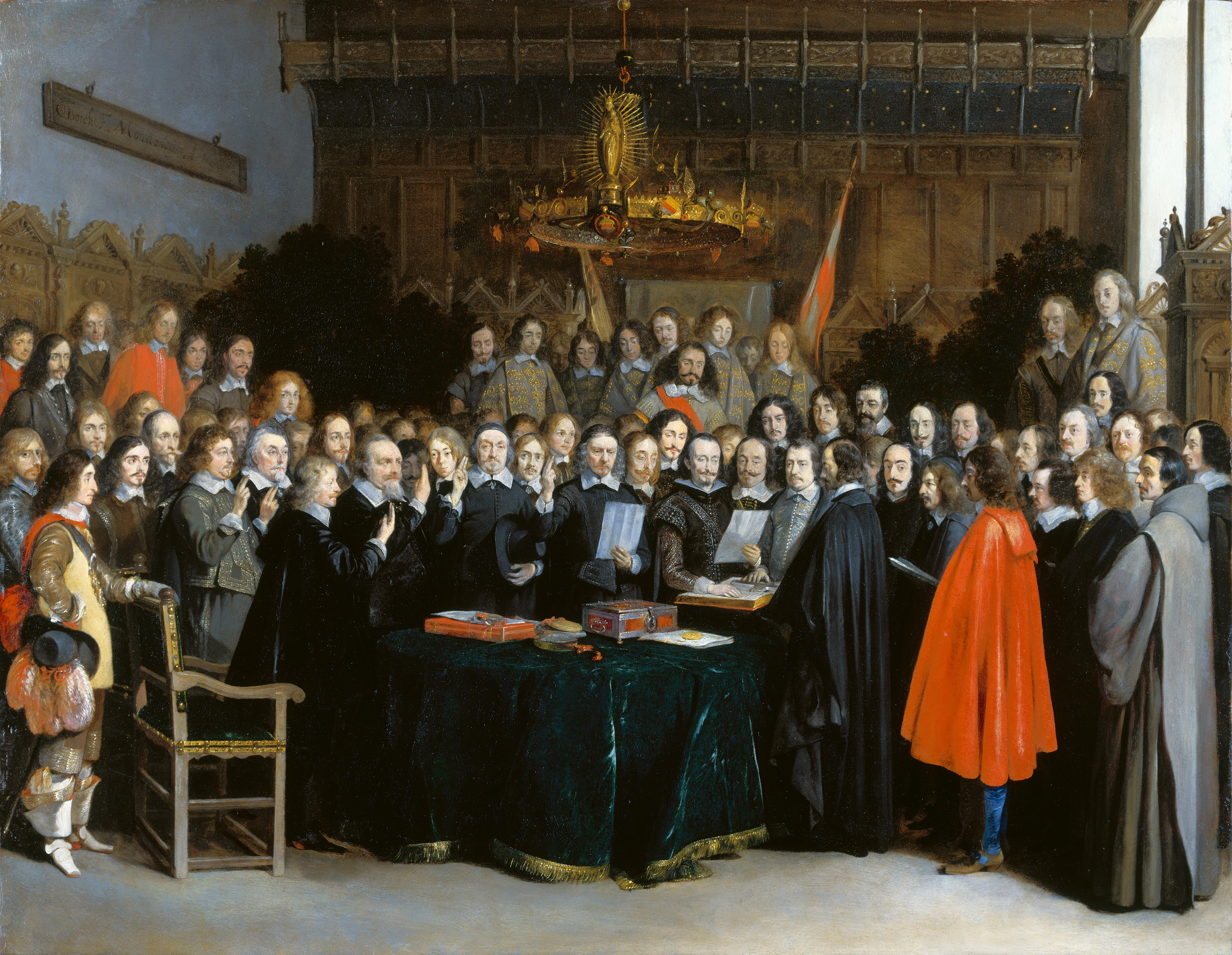
Ratification of the Treaty of Münster, between the Spanish and the Dutch, 1648

An armistice is a formal agreement of conflicting parties to stop fighting. It is not necessarily the end of a war, as it may constitute only a cessation of hostilities while an attempt is made to negotiate a lasting peace. It is derived from the Latin arma, meaning "arms" (as in weapons) and -stitium, meaning "a stopping".

The United Nations Security Council often imposes, or tries to impose, ceasefire resolutions on parties in modern conflicts. Armistices are always negotiated between the parties themselves and are thus generally seen as more binding than non-mandatory UN cease-fire resolutions in modern international law.

An armistice is a modus vivendi and is not the same as a peace treaty, which may take months or even years to agree on. The 1953 Korean War Armistice Agreement is a major example of an armistice which has not been followed by a peace treaty. An armistice is also different from a truce or ceasefire, which refer to a temporary cessation of hostilities for an agreed limited time or within a limited area. A truce may be needed in order to negotiate an armistice.

According to the Dictionary of the International Law of Armed Conflict, "An armistice does not put an end to the state of war, which subsists with all its legal consequences."

== International law ==
Under international law, an armistice is a legal agreement (often in a document) that ends fighting between the "belligerent parties" of a war or conflict. At the Hague Convention of 1899, three treaties were agreed and three declarations made. The Convention with respect to the Laws and Customs of War on Land stated, "If [the armistice's] duration is not fixed," the parties may resume fighting (Article 36) as they choose but with proper notifications. That is in comparison to a "fixed duration" armistice in which the parties may renew fighting only at the end of the particular fixed duration. When the belligerent parties say in effect that "this armistice completely ends the fighting" without any end date for the armistice, the duration of the armistice is fixed in the sense that no resumption of the fighting is allowed at any time. For example, the Korean Armistice Agreement calls for a "ceasefire and armistice" and has the "objective of establishing an armistice which will ensure a complete cessation of hostilities and of all acts of armed force in Korea until a final peaceful settlement is achieved."

== Armistice Day ==
Armistice Day (which coincides with Remembrance Day and Veterans Day, public holidays) is commemorated every year on 11 November to mark the Armistice of 11 November 1918 signed between the Allies of World War I and the German Empire at Compiègne, France, for the cessation of hostilities on the Western Front of World War I, which took effect at eleven o'clock in the morning, the "eleventh hour of the eleventh day of the eleventh month" of 1918.

Most countries changed the name of the holiday after World War II to honor veterans of that and subsequent conflicts. Most member states of the Commonwealth of Nations adopted the name Remembrance Day, and the United States chose Veterans Day.

== See also ==
- List of armistices
- Negotiation
- Alternative dispute resolution
- Bargaining model of war
