= List of armistices =

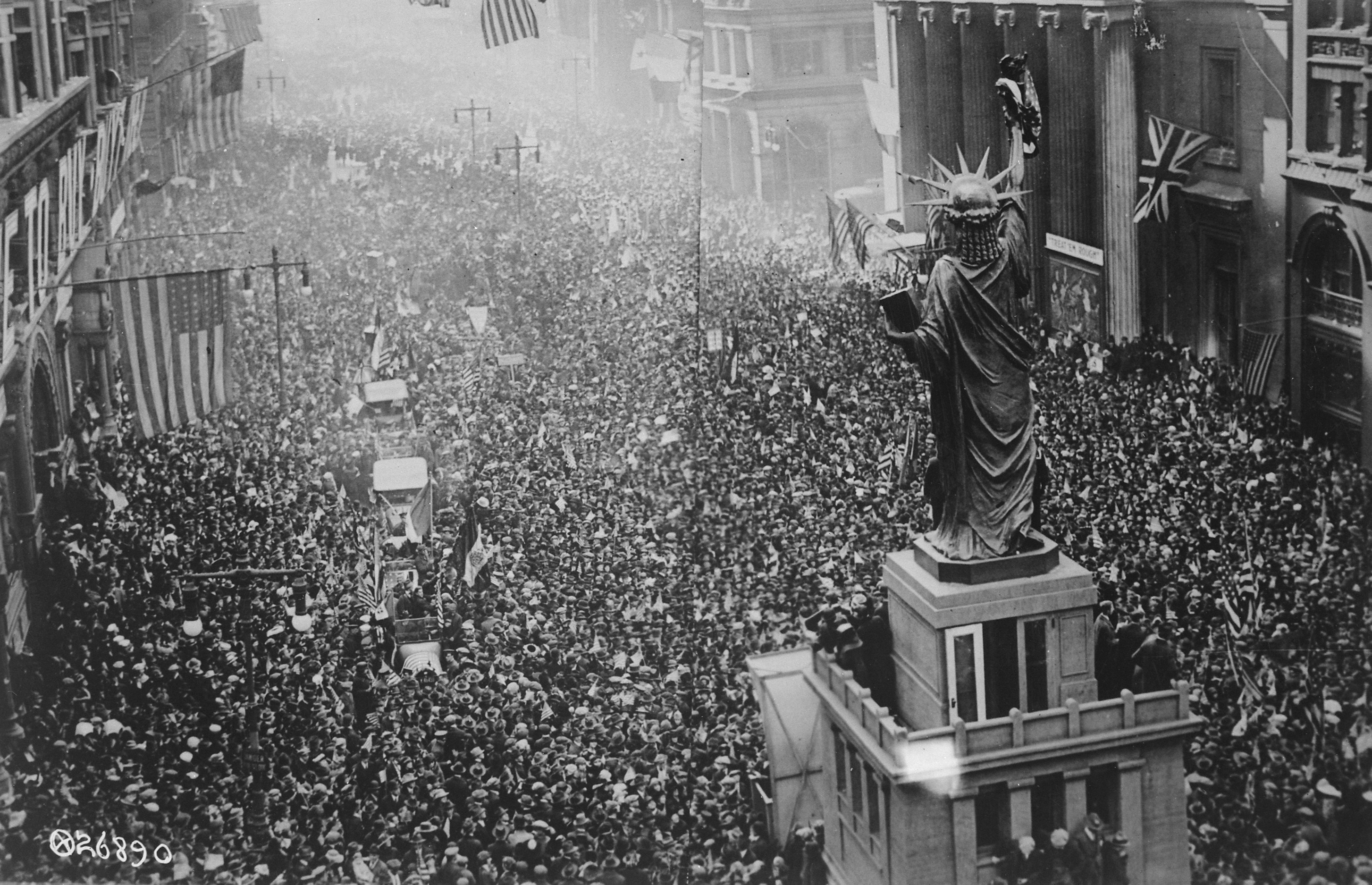
The announcement of the Armistice of 11 November 1918 was met with large celebrations in Allied countries.

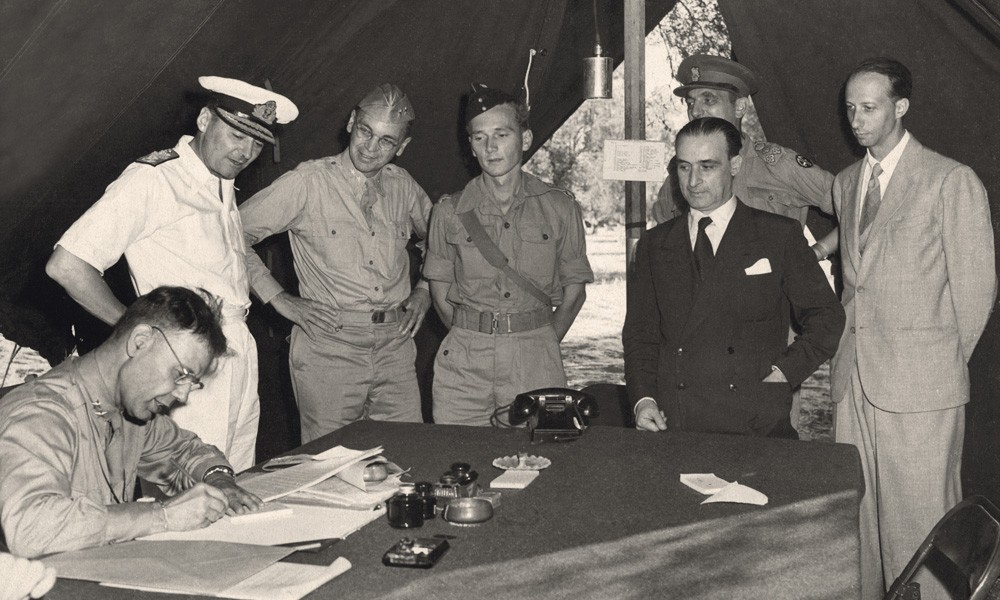
Italians and Anglo-Americans signed the Armistice of Cassibile in 1943.

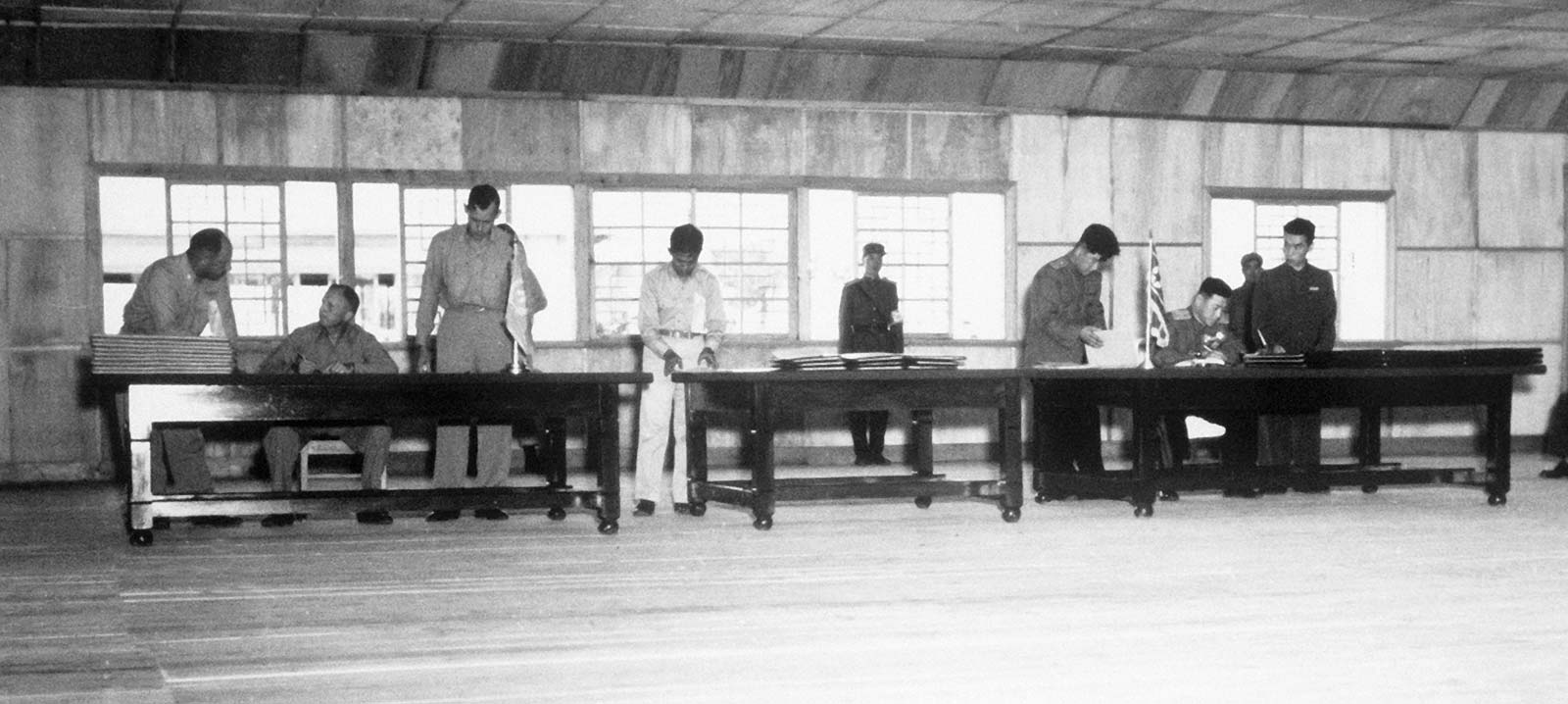
Delegates signed the Korean Armistice Agreement in 1953.

An armistice is a formal agreement of warring parties to stop fighting. It is not necessarily the end of a war, as it may constitute only a cessation of hostilities while an attempt is made to negotiate a lasting peace. It is derived from the Latin arma, meaning "arms" (as in weapons) and -stitium, meaning "a stopping".

This list of armistices is a general overview of notable armistice treaties.

== Pre-19th century ==
| Armistice | Signed | Effective | Party one | Party two | Notes |
|---|---|---|---|---|---|
| Georgian–Mongolian treaty of 1239 | 1239 | | Mongol Empire | Kingdom of Georgia | Ended the Mongol invasions of Georgia |
| Treaty of Bordeaux | 27 April 1243 | | Kingdom of France | Kingdom of England | Ended the Saintonge War; led to a final peace, the Treaty of Paris, which ended the First Hundred Years' War upon being signed on 4 December 1259 |
| Nicaean–Latin Armistice | August 1260 | | Empire of Nicaea | Latin Empire | Ended the Siege of Constantinople |
| Armistice of Copenhagen | 1537 | | | | Ended the Danish Count's Feud |
| Truce of Adrianople | 1547 | | Habsburg monarchy | Ottoman Empire | Ended the Habsburg–Ottoman war of 1540–1547 |
| Truce of Altmark | 26 September 1629 | | Polish–Lithuanian Commonwealth | Swedish Empire | Also known as the Treaty of Stary Targ; ended the Polish–Swedish War; an extension, the Treaty of Stuhmsdorf, was signed on 12 September 1635 |
| Treaty of Stuhmsdorf | 12 September 1635 | | Polish–Lithuanian Commonwealth | Swedish Empire | Also known as the Treaty of Sztumska Wieś; extended the Truce of Altmark |
| Peace of Münster | 30 January 1648 | | Dutch Republic | Spanish Empire | Ended the Eighty Years' War |
| Treaty of Münster | 24 October 1648 | | Kingdom of France | Holy Roman Empire | Part of the Peace of Westphalia, which ended the Thirty Years' War |
| Treaty of Osnabrück | 24 October 1648 | | Swedish Empire | Holy Roman Empire | Part of the Peace of Westphalia, which ended the Thirty Years' War |
| Armistice of Cherasco | 28 April 1796 | | Kingdom of Sardinia | French First Republic | |
| Armistice of Bologna | 23 June 1796 | | Papal States | French First Republic | A final peace, the Treaty of Tolentino, was signed on 19 February 1797 |
| Peace of Leoben | 18 April 1797 | 24 May 1797 | Holy Roman Empire | French First Republic | A final peace, the Treaty of Campo Formio, was signed on 17 October 1797 |
| Armistice of March 30, 1798 | 30 March 1798 | | French First Republic | Kingdom of Great Britain | |
| Convention of Alessandria | 15 June 1800 | | Habsburg monarchy | French First Republic | Also known as the Armistice of Marengo; attempted to end the War of the Second Coalition |
| Armistice of Steyr | 25 December 1800 | | Holy Roman Empire | French First Republic | A final peace, the Treaty of Lunéville, was signed on 9 February 1801 |

== 19th century ==
| Armistice | Signed | Effective | Party one | Party two | Notes |
|---|---|---|---|---|---|
| Armistice of Treviso | 16 January 1801 | | Habsburg monarchy | French First Republic | A final peace, the Treaty of Lunéville, was signed on 9 February 1801 |
| Armistice of Znaim | 12 July 1809 | | Austrian Empire | First French Empire | Led to a final peace, the Treaty of Schönbrunn, which ended the War of the Fifth Coalition upon being signed on 14 October 1809 |
| Truce of Pläswitz | 4 June 1813 | | Kingdom of Prussia; Russian Empire; United Kingdom of Great Britain and Ireland | First French Empire | Also known as the Armistice of Pläswitz |
| Armistice of Salasco | 9 August 1848 | | Kingdom of Sardinia | Austrian Empire | Attempted to end the First Italian War of Independence |
| Armistice of Malmö | 26 August 1848 | | Danish Unitary State | Kingdom of Prussia | Attempted to end the First Schleswig War |
| Armistice of Vignale | 24 March 1849 | | Kingdom of Sardinia | Austrian Empire | A final peace, the Peace of Milan, was signed on 6 August 1849 |
| Armistice of Villafranca | 11 and 12 July 1859 | 12 July 1859 | Second French Empire; Kingdom of Sardinia | Austrian Empire | Ended the Second Italian War of Independence |
| Armistice of Cormons | 12 August 1866 | | Kingdom of Italy | Austrian Empire | Ended the Third Italian War of Independence; a final peace, the Treaty of Vienna, was signed on 3 October 1866 |
| Armistice of Versailles | 28 January 1871 | 28 and 31 January 1871 | French Third Republic | German Empire | De facto conditional surrender of the French Third Republic to the German Empire; ended the Franco-Prussian War; a final peace, the Treaty of Frankfurt, was signed on 10 May 1871 |

== Early 20th century ==
=== During World War I ===
| Armistice | Signed | Effective | Party one | Party two | Notes |
|---|---|---|---|---|---|
| Armistice of Focșani | 9 December 1917 | | Kingdom of Romania; Russian Soviet Republic | German Empire; Austria-Hungary; Ottoman Empire; Tsardom of Bulgaria | A final peace, the Treaty of Bucharest, was signed on 7 May 1918 |
| Armistice between Russia and the Central Powers | 15 December 1917 | 17 December 1917 | Russian Soviet Republic | German Empire; Austria-Hungary; Ottoman Empire; Tsardom of Bulgaria | Attempted to end the Eastern Front of World War I; hostilities were renewed on 18 February 1918, but the state of war came to an end after the Treaty of Brest-Litovsk was signed on 3 March 1918 |
| Armistice of Erzincan | 18 December 1917 | | Ottoman Empire | Transcaucasian Commissariat of the Russian Soviet Republic | |
| Armistice of Salonica | 29 September 1918 | 30 September 1918 | Tsardom of Bulgaria | Allies of World War I | |
| Armistice of Mudros | 30 October 1918 | 31 October 1918 | Ottoman Empire | United Kingdom of Great Britain and Ireland | Ended fighting in the Middle Eastern theatre of World War I |
| Armistice of Villa Giusti | 3 November 1918 | 4 November 1918 | Kingdom of Italy | Austria-Hungary | Ended fighting on the Italian front of World War I |
| Armistice of 11 November 1918 | 11 November 1918 | | Weimar Republic | Allies of World War I | Also known as the Armistice of Compiègne, this armistice, upon being signed amid the German revolution of 1918–1919, ended fighting on the Western Front of World War I; the date of its signature is commemorated as Armistice Day; a final peace, the Treaty of Versailles, was signed on 28 June 1919 |
| Armistice of Belgrade | 13 November 1918 | | French Third Republic | Kingdom of Hungary | A final peace, the Treaty of Trianon was signed on 4 June 1920. |

=== After World War I ===
| Armistice | Signed | Effective | Party one | Party two | Notes |
|---|---|---|---|---|---|
| Agreement between Armenia and Azerbaijan respecting the District of Zanghezour | 23 November 1919 | | First Republic of Armenia | Azerbaijan Democratic Republic | Attempted to end the Armenian–Azerbaijani war |
| Armistice of Mudanya | 11 October 1922 | 13 October 1922 | Government of the Grand National Assembly | United Kingdom of Great Britain and Ireland; French Third Republic; Kingdom of Italy; Kingdom of Greece (acceded on 13 October 1922) | |

== Mid-20th century ==
=== Before World War II ===
| Armistice | Signed | Effective | Party one | Party two | Notes |
|---|---|---|---|---|---|
| Chaco Armistice | 19 December 1933 | | Bolivia | Paraguay | Attempted to end the Chaco War |

=== During World War II ===
| Armistice | Signed | Effective | Party one | Party two | Notes |
|---|---|---|---|---|---|
| Moscow Peace Treaty | 12 March 1940 | 13 March 1940 | Finland | Soviet Union | Ended the Winter War |
| Armistice of 22 June 1940 | 22 June 1940 | 25 June 1940 | French Third Republic | Nazi Germany | Also known as the Second Armistice of Compiègne, this armistice ended the Battle of France; no peace treaty was signed |
| Franco-Italian Armistice | 24 June 1940 | 25 June 1940 | French Third Republic | Fascist Italy | Also known as the Armistice of Villa Incisa; ended the Italian invasion of France |
| Second Armistice of Belgrade | 17 April 1941 | 18 April 1941 | Kingdom of Yugoslavia | Nazi Germany; Fascist Italy; Kingdom of Hungary | Worded as an unconditional surrender; on account of its doubtful legality, no peace was signed |
| Armistice of Saint Jean d'Acre | 14 July 1941 | | United Kingdom | Vichy France | Also known as the Convention of Acre; ended the Syria–Lebanon campaign |
| Armistice of Cassibile | 3 September 1943 | 8 September 1943 | Kingdom of Italy | United States; United Kingdom | Ended hostilities between the Kingdom of Italy and Allies of World War II |
| Armistice of Malta | 29 September 1943 | | Kingdom of the South | United States; United Kingdom | Worded as unconditional surrender but coined as additional terms of the Armistice of Cassibile |
| Moscow Armistice | 19 September 1944 | | Finland | Soviet Union; United Kingdom | Ended the Continuation War |

=== After World War II ===
| Armistice | Signed | Effective | Party one | Party two | Notes |
|---|---|---|---|---|---|
| 1949 Armistice Agreements | 24 February – 20 July 1949 | | Israel | Kingdom of Egypt; Lebanon; Jordan; First Syrian Republic | Ended the 1948 Arab–Israeli War and 1948 Palestine war |
| Korean Armistice Agreement | 27 July 1953 | | United Nations Command | Korean People's Army of North Korea; People's Volunteer Army of China | Ended the Korean War |
| Geneva Agreements | 21 July 1954 | 23 July 1954 | French Fourth Republic | Viet Minh of North Vietnam | Ended the First Indochina War |
| Évian Accords | 18 March 1962 | 19 March 1962 | France | Provisional Government of the Algerian Republic | Ended the Algerian War |

== Late 20th century ==
| Armistice | Signed | Effective | Party one | Party two | Notes |
|---|---|---|---|---|---|
| Paris Peace Accords | January 27, 1973 | | United States South Vietnam | North Vietnam Viet Cong | Attempt to end the Vietnam War |
| Mount Data Peace Accord | 13 September 1986 | | Philippines | Cordillera People's Liberation Army of the Philippines | Ended the Cordillera conflict |
| Hat Yai Peace Agreement | 13 December 1989 | | Malaysia; Thailand | Malayan Communist Party of Malaysia and Singapore | Ended the Communist insurgency in Malaysia |
| Implementation Agreement | 2 January 1992 | 3 January 1992 | Socialist Federal Republic of Yugoslavia | Croatia | Also known as the Sarajevo Agreement; part of the Vance plan, which attempted to end the Croatian War of Independence |
| Sochi agreement | 24 June 1992 and 27 July 1993 | | Georgia | Russia; South Ossetia; Abkhazia | Also known as the Dagomys Agreements; ended the South Ossetia war and attempted to end the War in Abkhazia |
| Washington Agreement | 18 March 1994 | 30 March 1994 | Republic of Bosnia and Herzegovina | Croatian Republic of Herzeg-Bosnia | Ended the Croat-Bosniak War |
| Bishkek Protocol | 5 May 1994 | 12 May 1994 | Azerbaijan | Republic of Artsakh; Armenia | Ended the First Nagorno-Karabakh War |
| Lusaka Protocol | 20 November 1994 | | Angola | UNITA | Attempted to end the Angolan Civil War |
| Dayton Agreement | 14 December 1995 | | Federal Republic of Yugoslavia | Republic of Bosnia and Herzegovina; Croatia | Ended the Bosnian War |
| Lusaka Ceasefire Agreement | 10 July 1999 | 11 July 1999 | Democratic Republic of the Congo; Angola; Namibia; Zimbabwe | Rwanda; Uganda | Attempted to end the Second Congo War |

== Early 21st century ==
| Armistice | Signed | Effective | Party one | Party two | Notes |
|---|---|---|---|---|---|
| Humanitarian Ceasefire Agreement | 8 April 2004 | 11 April 2004 | Sudan | Justice and Equality Movement of Sudan; Sudan Liberation Movement/Army | Attempted to end the War in Darfur |
| Minsk Protocol | 5 September 2014 | | Ukraine | Russia; Donetsk People's Republic; Luhansk People's Republic | Also known as Minsk I; attempted to end the war in Donbas |
| Minsk II | 12 February 2015 | 15 February 2015 | Ukraine | Russia; Donetsk People's Republic; Luhansk People's Republic | Attempted to end the war in Donbas |
| Nationwide Ceasefire Agreement | 15 October 2015 | | Myanmar | All Burma Students' Democratic Front; Arakan Liberation Party; Chin National Front; DKBA-5; Karen National Union; KNU/KNLA Peace Council; Pa-O National Liberation Army; Restoration Council of Shan State; Lahu Democratic Union (acceded on 13 February 2018); New Mon State Party (acceded on 13 February 2018) | Attempted to end the Myanmar conflict |
| Juba Peace Agreement | 31 August and 3 October 2020 | | Sudan | Sudan Revolutionary Front; Sudan Liberation Movement/Army | Ended the War in Darfur |
| 2020 Nagorno-Karabakh ceasefire agreement | 9 November 2020 | 10 November 2020 | Azerbaijan | Armenia | Ended the Second Nagorno-Karabakh War |
| 2023 Nagorno-Karabakh ceasefire agreement | 20 September 2023 | 21 September 2023 | Azerbaijan | Republic of Artsakh; Armenia | Ended the 2023 Azerbaijani offensive in Nagorno-Karabakh |
| January 2025 Gaza war ceasefire | 17 January 2025 | 19 January 2025 | Hamas of Palestine | Israel | Hostages-and-prisoners exchange and armistice; attempted to end the Gaza war |
