= Card Players (Kunstmuseum, The Hague) =

Painting by Theo van Doesburg

- De kaartspelers
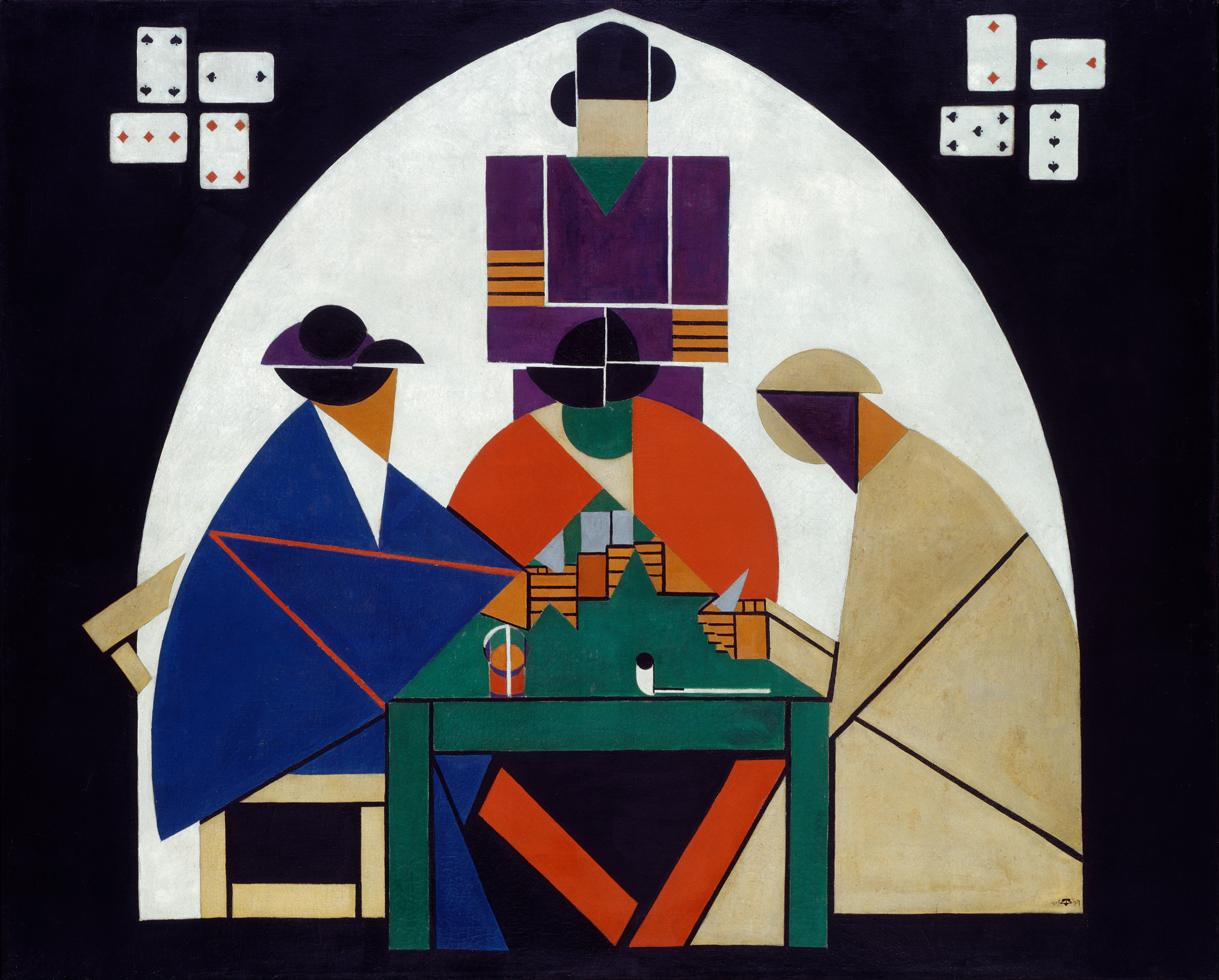
- Artist: Theo van Doesburg
- Year: 1916
- Dimensions: 126.2 cm (49.7 in) × 156.2 cm (61.5 in)
- Location: Kunstmuseum Den Haag
- Collection: Cultural Heritage Agency of the Netherlands Art Collection
- Accession no.: AB4097
- Identifiers: RKDimages ID: 215359

The Card Players is a painting by the Dutch artist Theo van Doesburg, from 1916-1917.

== Background ==
While portraying a common topic in art history - card players while smoking - the treatment was, in the 1910s, very new. Drawing on the new abstract style pioneered by Picasso, Kanindsky and Mondrian, van Doesburg's painting was executed while he and Mondrian were in the early days of the still developing De Stijl philosophy - a reaction to the natural looking paintings that were still common in exhibitions at the time. This particular painting however did not meet the pure abstraction of Cubism: in the words of one commentator, the painting "transformed into arrangements of geometrical shapes but remain intact, rather than dissolving into separate blocks of colour dispersed over the background."

The painting hangs in the Kunstmuseum, The Hague, Netherlands, on long-term loan from the Dutch government collection.
