= John Hodgson Lobley =

English painter

John Hodgson Lobley was an English artist. He was born 28 November 1878 in Huddersfield, Yorkshire, and died in 1954. He is best known for his work as an official war artist for the Royal Army Medical Corps during World War I.

== Biography ==
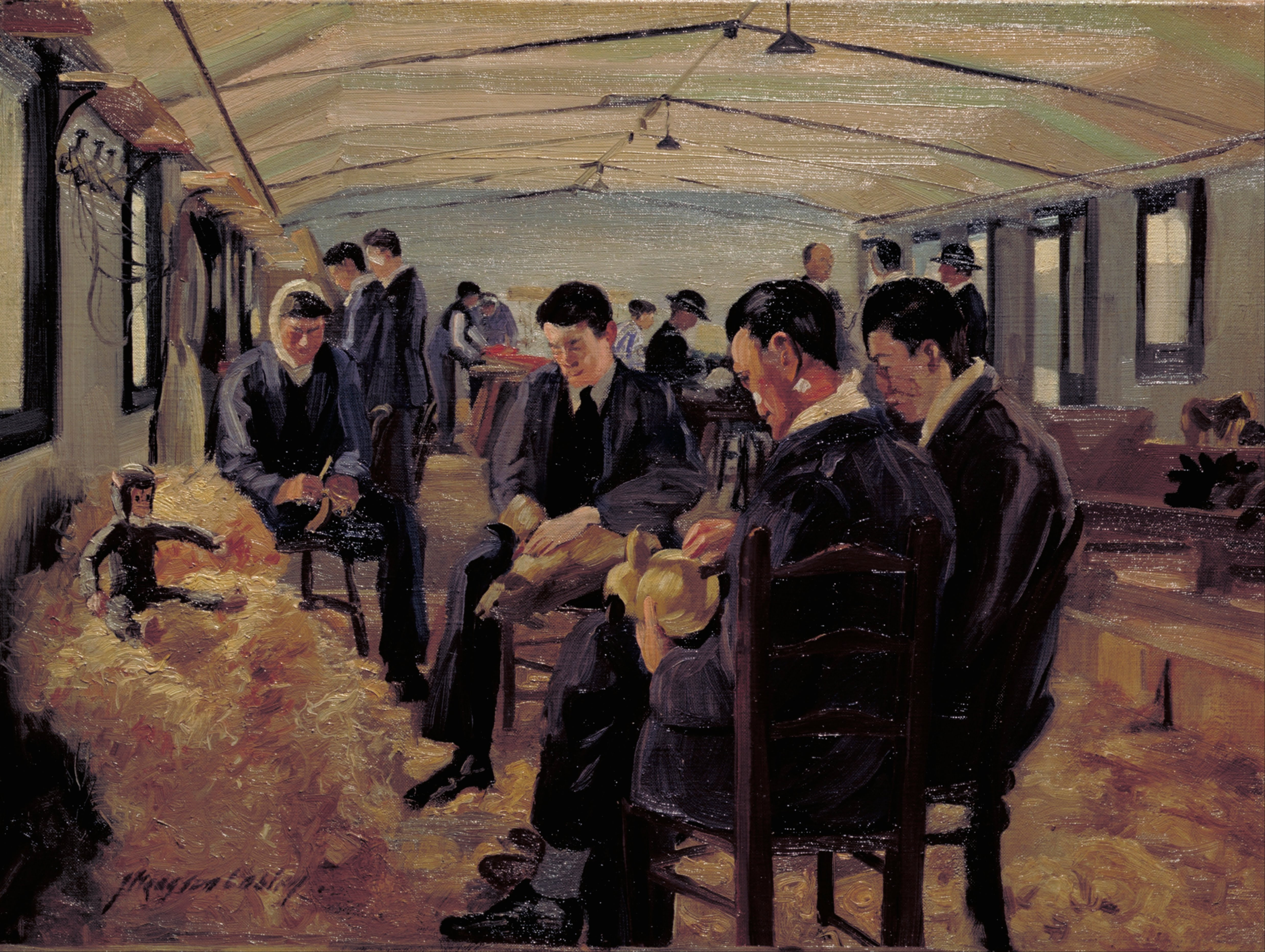
The Queen's Hospital for Facial Injuries, Frognal, Sidcup: The toy-makers' shop

Lobley was the son of a woollen merchant in Huddersfield. He studied in London at the Slade School of Fine Art, at the Royal College of Art and at the Royal Academy. He also married in London and lived at 13 Musgrave Crescent, Walham Green. Later, he moved to Dorset.

During World War One, Lobley was commissioned by the Royal Army Medical Corps to produce an artistic record of their work and created 120 paintings in both France and Britain. These include scenes of rehabilitation in the Queens Hospital for Facial Injuries at Frognal, Sidcup and numerous other military hospital scenes; of the Royal Army Medical Corps in training at Blackpool; of casualty clearing stations near battlefields in France; and of wounded soldiers arriving at Charing Cross Station in London. It has been said of Lobley that "Like many of the artists who witnessed the War first hand, he was deeply affected by what he had seen. His paintings of the War do not glorify it at all."

In addition to his wartime work, Lobley painted figures, portraits and landscapes. Whilst in London, he is said to have painted "many charming views of London, showing the many parks and squares". Some Dorset landscapes and a portrait of his wife owned by the Imperial War Museum. A painting of his called Harvest was praised in The New Age for 28 July 1910 (Vol. 7, p. 307). Lobley won the Turner Gold Medal, a scholarship for landscape painting in 1903, and two Silver medals on subsequent occasions.

== Collections ==
Significant collections of Lobley's work include the following:

- Goupil Gallery (19 paintings)
- London Salon (9 paintings)
- Royal Academy (15 paintings)
- Royal Society of British Artists (52 paintings)
- Ridley Art Club (4 paintings)
- Imperial War Museum (35 paintings, at minimum)
- Huddersfield Art Gallery
