= Explosive mine =

A mine is an explosive placed underground or underwater that explodes when disturbed, or when remotely triggered. The term originated from the use of mining to go under the enemy's city walls.

Mines, unlike bombs, are placed in situ and then require some other stimulus from a target before they will detonate.

- Land mine, mines on land
  - Anti-personnel mine, a land mine targeting people on foot
  - Anti-tank mine, a land mine against vehicles
- Naval mine or sea mine, a mine at sea, either floating or on the sea bed
  - Captive torpedo, a sea mine which releases a torpedo on sensing a target
- Aerial mine or parachute mine, an air-dropped sea mine falling gently under a parachute, used as a high-capacity cheaply cased large bomb against ground targets
  - Cluster bomb, an aerial bomb which releases a large number of small submunitions, which often act as mines.
