= Armistice of Focșani =

1917 World War I armistice

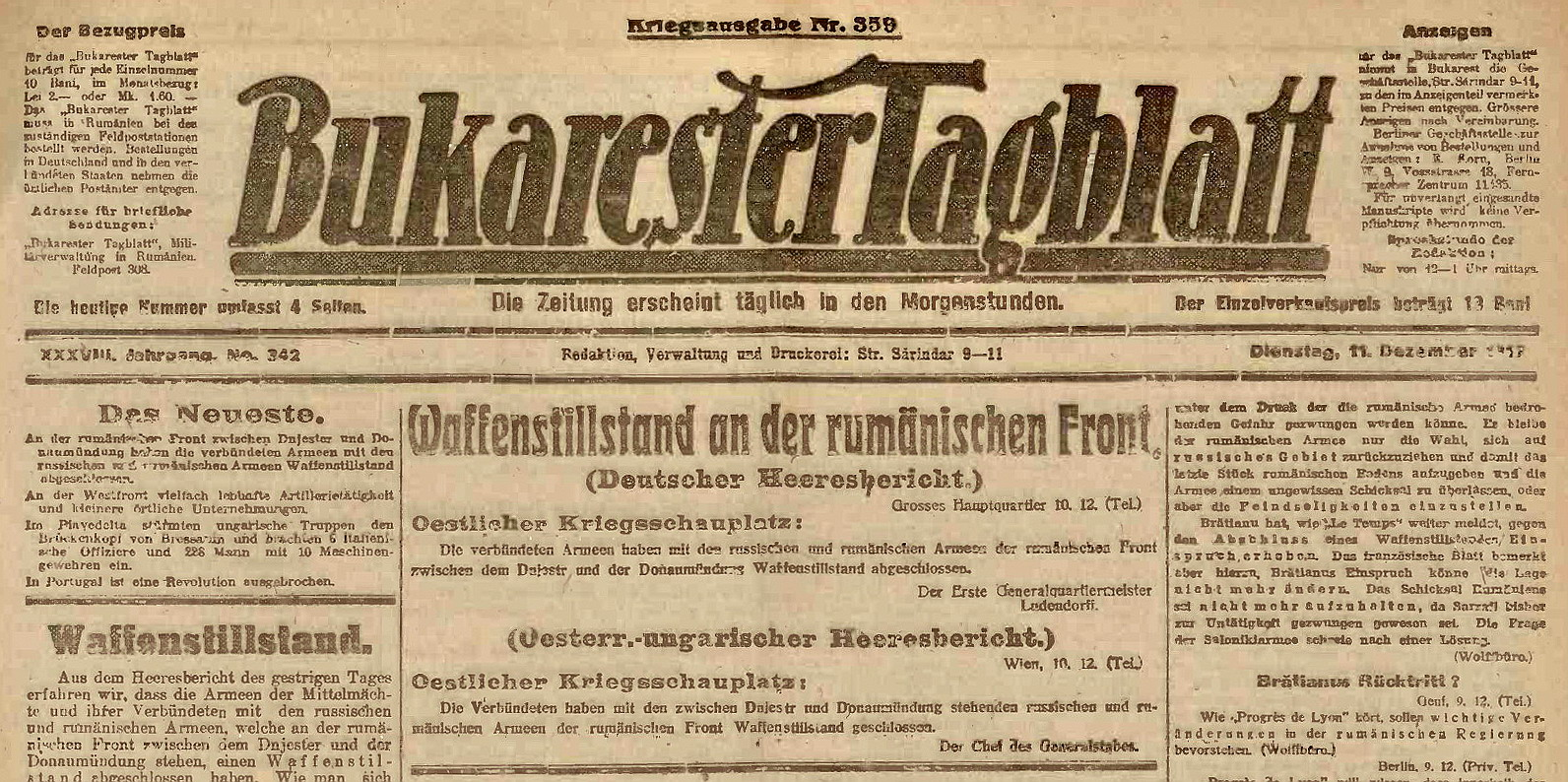
- "Bukarester Tagblatt" announcing the conclusion of the truce
- Type: Truce
- Signed: 9 December 1917
- Location: Focșani, Kingdom of Romania
- Negotiators: General Anatoly Kelchevsky (Russian Republic); General Alexandru Lupescu (Romania); General Curt von Morgen (Central Powers)
- Parties: German Empire; Austria-Hungary; Ottoman Empire; (Tsardom of Bulgaria (1908–1946)) Bulgaria; (Kingdom of Romania) Romania; Russian Republic

The Armistice of Focșani (Romanian: Armistițiul de la Focșani, also called the Truce of Focșani) was an agreement that ended the hostilities between Romania (member of the Allied Powers) and the Central Powers in World War I. It was signed on 9 December 1917 in Focșani in Romania.

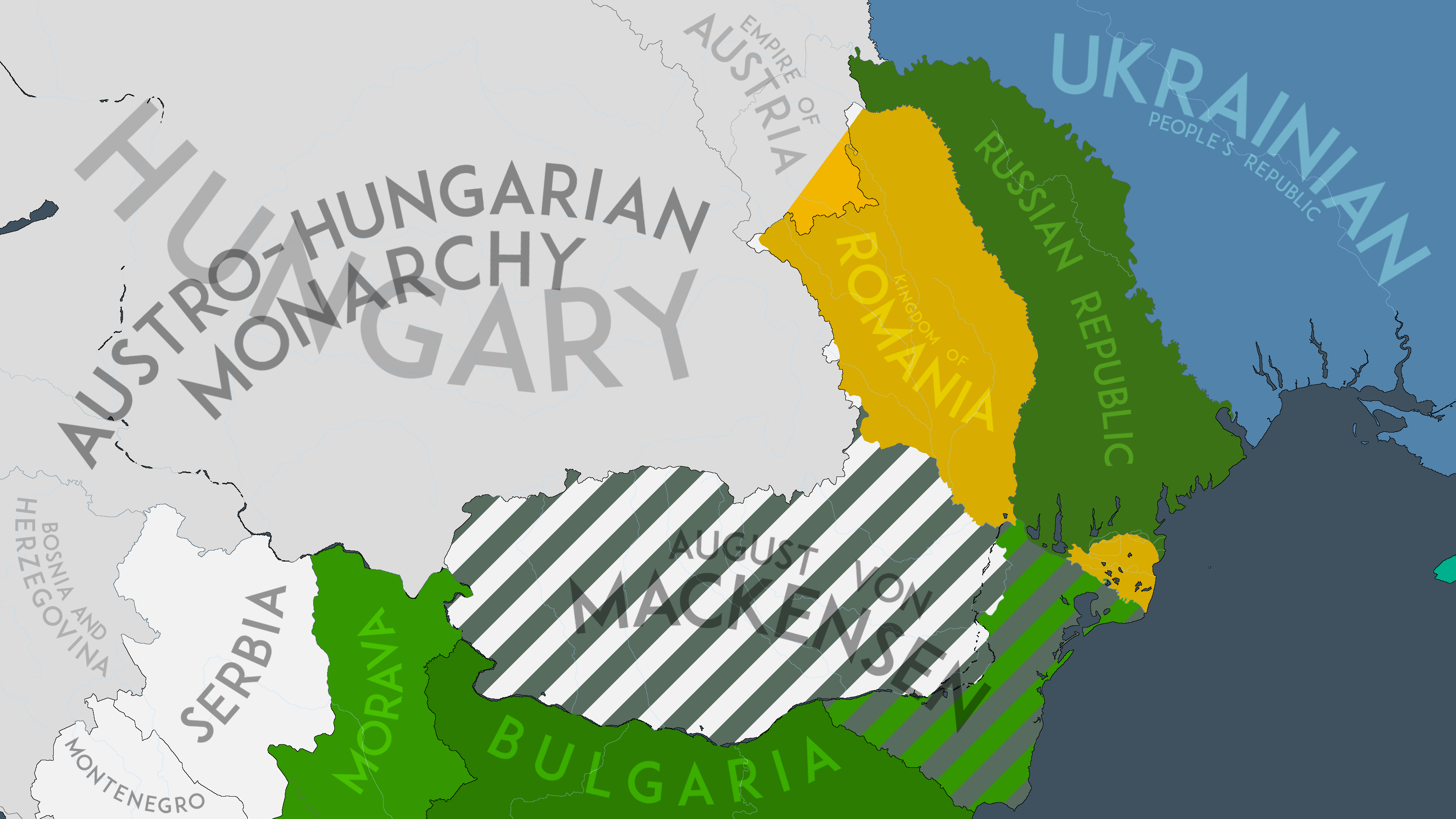
Romania on 9 December 1917, after the Armistice of Focsani.

== Background ==
Romania had entered World War I in August 1916, invading Austria-Hungary in an attempt to seize Transylvania. However, the Central Powers launched a successful counteroffensive in September 1916, capturing Bucharest and occupying approximately two thirds of the Romanian territory by December 1916. The Romanian government was forced to retreat to Iași, in the historical region of Moldavia, but was able to stave off complete collapse thanks to the numerous Russian reinforcements that had been sent to Romania to prevent a Central Power invasion of southern Russia at the beginning of 1917, and later, in spite of the unwillingness of the Russian troops to continue fighting, thanks to the successful repulse of the Central Powers' offensive at Mărășești and Oituz.

== Truce ==
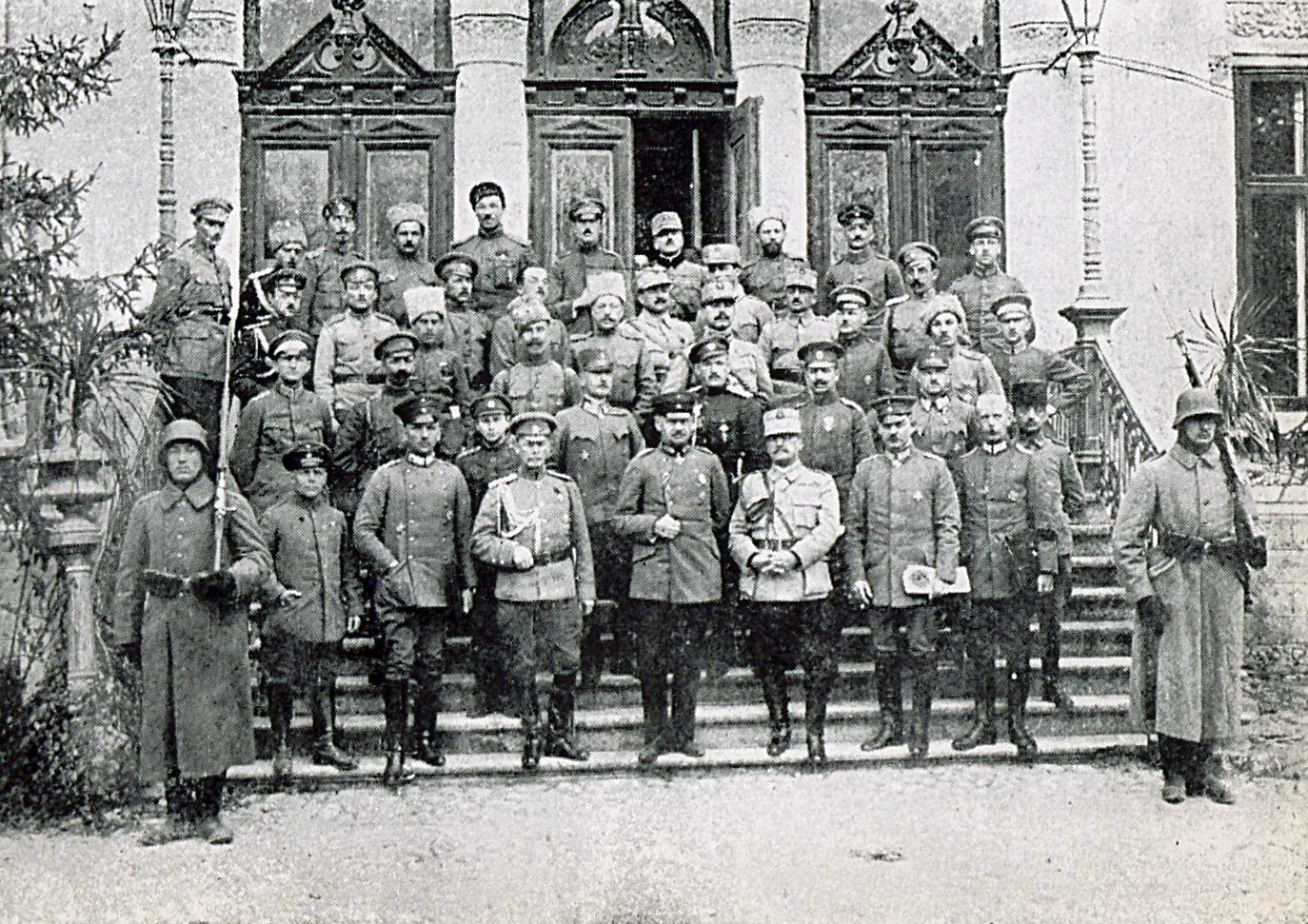
The delegates of the negotiating parties

After the October Revolution of 1917, Russia fell into civil war, and the Russian government began withdrawing its troops from Romania. On 4 and 5 December 1917, the Russians signed two ceasefire agreements with the Central Powers, followed later (on 15 December) by a full armistice and, under the direction of Leon Trotsky and Adolph Joffe, peace negotiations with the Central Powers in Brest-Litovsk. The Treaty of Brest-Litovsk made Romania geographically exposed. Lacking Russian support, the Romanian government was subsequently forced to sue for peace.

The resulting truce was signed on 9 December 1917 in Focșani on the Siret River, which was the site of the main Romanian defensive line. The armistice ended Romanian hostilities with Germany, Austria-Hungary, Bulgaria, and the Ottoman Empire.

== Aftermath ==
While the fighting had ended, much of Romania remained under Central Powers occupation after the truce. On 7 May 1918, following this Armistice of Focșani, the Romanian government signed the punitive Treaty of Bucharest, which required Romania to cede Southern Dobruja, the southern Northern Dobruja, and several passes in the Carpathian Mountains and grant multiple economic privileges to the Central Powers. On 10 October 1918, Romania claimed its disabling of the Treaty of Bucharest to rejoin the Allied Powers against the Central Powers.

In 1919, Romania's territorial cessions to Germany were renounced in the Treaty of Versailles. Romania's cessions to Austria-Hungary were renounced in the Treaty of Saint-Germain in 1919 and the Treaty of Trianon in 1920, while the cessions to Bulgaria were renounced in the Treaty of Neuilly in 1919.
