= Reh =

Reh or REH may refer to:

== People ==
- Alina Reh (born 1997), German long-distance runner
- Claudia Reh (born 1970), German light artist
- Emma Reh (1896–1982), American journalist
- Francis Frederick Reh (1911–1994), American Catholic bishop
- Ludwig Reh (1867–1940), German entomologist
- Reh Jones (born 1984), American YouTube personality
- REH (Robert E. Howard) (1906–1936), pulp fiction author
- Thomas Reh, American biochemist
- Virginia Reh, American actress and theatre director

== Other uses ==
- Rare Earth hypothesis that extraterrestrial life rarely happens
- Royal Edinburgh Hospital, Scotland
- Reh Inscription, a Brahmi inscription at the Reh archaeological site, Uttar Pradesh, India
- ر, Arabic letter rāʾ (named ARABIC LETTER REH in Unicode)
