= Wieringa =

Wieringa is a Dutch surname. Notable people with the surname include:

- Kees Wieringa, Dutch pianist, composer and television program maker
- Roel Wieringa (born 1952), Dutch computer scientist
- Saskia Wieringa (born 1950), Dutch sociologist
- Tommy Wieringa, (born 1967), Dutch writer
