= Claudia Reh =

German Light Artist

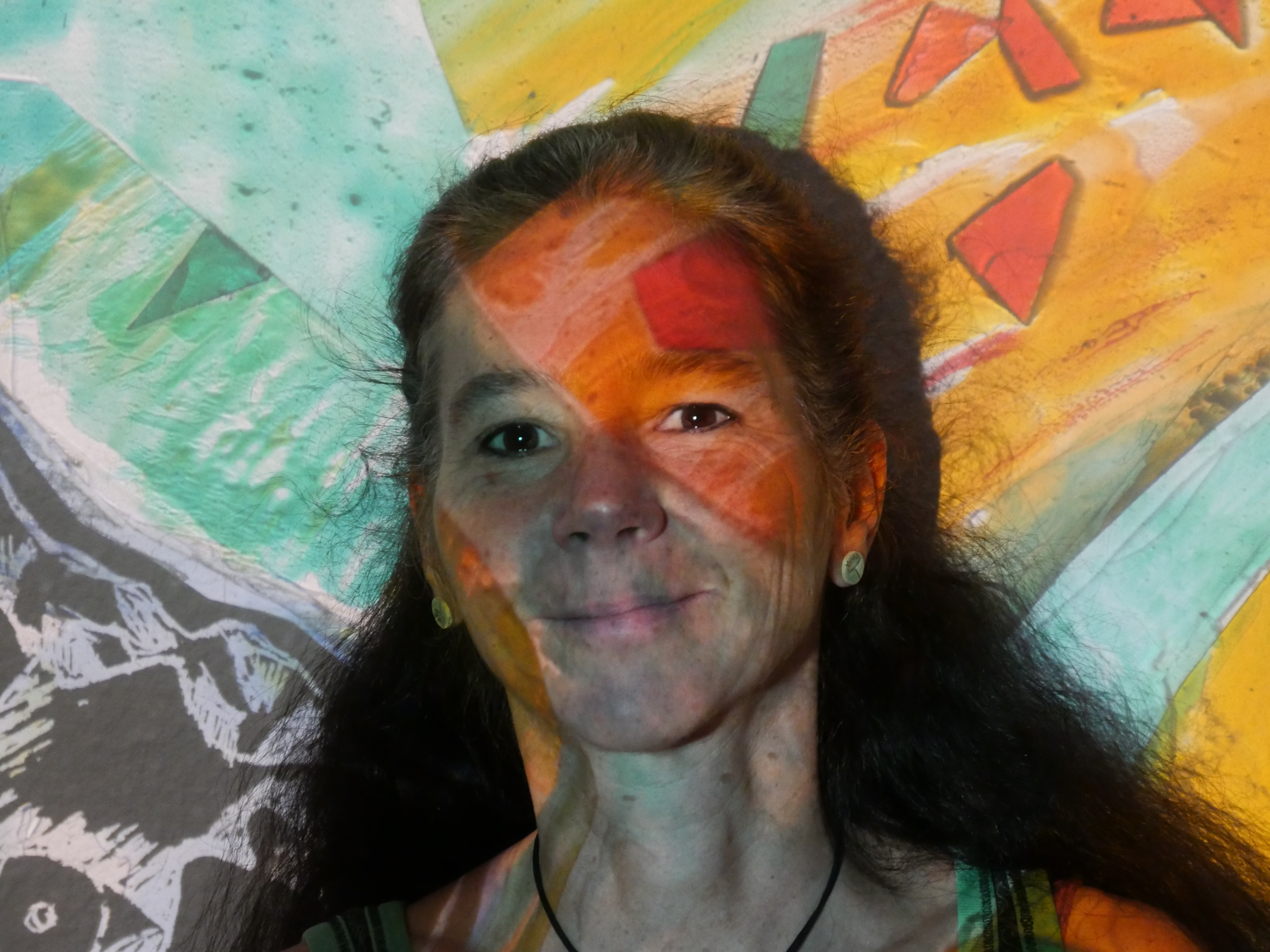
- Born: 1970 (age 55–56); Königs Wusterhausen, Brandenburg, Germany
- Known for: Light art, Performance art

Claudia Reh (German: [ˈklaʊdi̯a ˈʁeː]; born 1970) is a German light artist.

== Education ==
After training as a landscape gardener, Claudia Reh studied landscape architecture at the Technical University of Dresden from 1990 to 1996 and graduated with a diplom. From 2014 to 2017 she studied documentary film directing at filmArche in Berlin.

== Works ==
In addition to her work as a landscape architect, she first began as a visual artist with works on canvas and paper, lithography, objects, installations and animated films, before she concentrated on working with high-intensity overhead projectors for light projections and live paintings from 2006. During this time she developed the label Echtzeitlicht, under which she works with light installations (Light Murals) and live painting performances, mainly in public space. Since 2012 she has regularly taken part in international light festivals.

She is involved in the development of plays with light performances (at LOFFT Leipzig and the Societaetstheater Dresden, among others). Since 2009 she has also been working on animation and documentaries.

Claudia Reh lives in Dresden, Germany.

== Light/music performances (selection) ==
- 2023: Light performance at the chamber music evening of the Staatskapelle Dresden (Simeon ten Holt: Canto ostinato), Semperoper Dresden
- 2019: Light performance with Capella Jenensis (Jena, Germany): The Four Seasons (Vivaldi)

== Art in public space (Light Murals) (selection) ==
- 2026: Fjord Oslo Festival, Oslo (Norway): „Imagine Peace“.
- 2026: Copenhagen Light Festival, Copenhagen (Denmark): „Imagine Peace“.
- 2025: Essen Light Festival, Essen (Germany): „Imagine Peace“
- 2024: Speculum Artium Festival, Trbovlje (Slovenia): „All these little things“
- 2024: NINFEA Festival, Rionero in Vulture (Italy): „Foresta Magica“
- 2024: Ghent Light Festival (Belgium): „It’s a question of blue“
- 2023: R.o.R intermedia art festival, Nova Gorica (Slovenia): „Turning - what we move around ...“
- 2023: Alberobello Light Festival (Italy): „Different colors of the swarms“
- 2022: Nuit d'hiver, Landerneau (France): "Hortus Decem"
- 2022: Visualia, Pula, (Croatia): "Sea light gardens"
- 2021: Vilnius Light Festival (Lithuania): "Interference"
- 2021: Light Move Festival, Łódź (Poland): "Open spaces"
- 2020: Murten Licht Festival (Switzerland): "Outside & à l'intérieur"
- 2018: Water Light Festival, Brixen (Italy): "Am Ende fließen alle Dinge ineinander und aus der Mitte entspringt ein Fluss"
- 2017/2018: Amsterdam Light Festival (Netherlands): "It was once drifting on the water"
- 2017: Murten Light Festival (Switzerland): "Spiegeltiefen"
- 2016: Alberobello Light Festival (Italy): "Aquabella"
- 2015: Lighting Guerrilla, Ljubljana (Slovenia): "Echtzeitlicht"
- 2015: Ghent Light Festival (Belgium): "Hortos Imaginarius"
- 2014: Lumina - Festival of Light, Cascais (Portugal): "Poem de Aqua"
- 2012/13: Amsterdam Light Festival (Netherlands): "Signs"
