= Daniel Hyatt =

Canadian actor

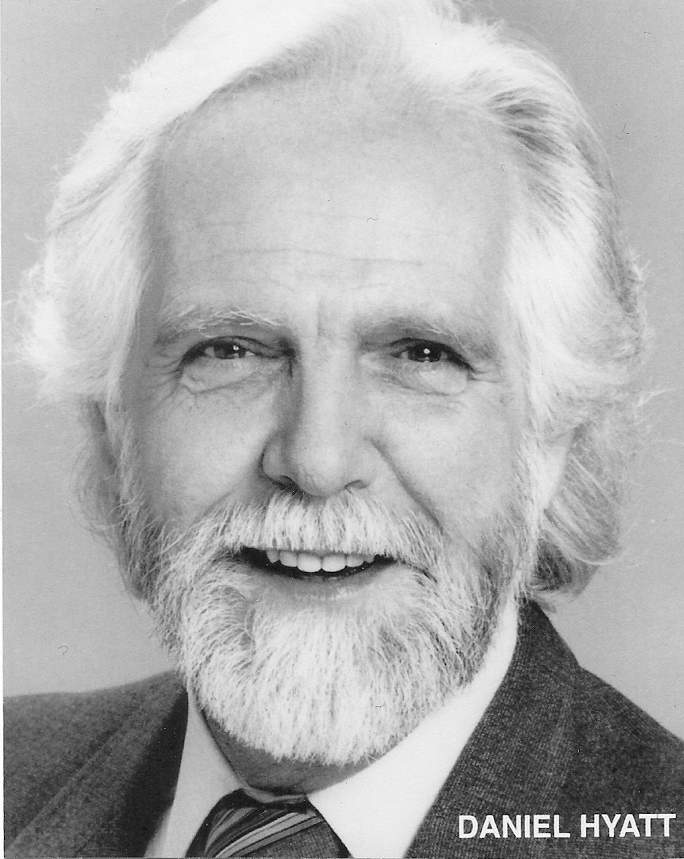
- Born: Daniel Fowler Hyatt; February 12, 1930; Toronto, Ontario, Canada
- Died: September 22, 2015 (aged 85); Toronto, Ontario, Canada
- Occupation: Actor

Daniel Fowler Hyatt (February 12, 1930 – September 22, 2015) was a Canadian actor whose career spanned more than fifty years. Based in Toronto, he performed across Canada, the United States, and Europe.

== Early life ==
Daniel Hyatt, the youngest of five children, was born in Toronto. His father was an electrical engineer. After his father's death in 1942, he attended North Toronto Collegiate.

As a teenager, Hyatt was a member of the Deer Park Players, a church group in Toronto that produced amateur classic plays. He performed in "The Merchant of Venice," "Romeo and Juliet" "Hamlet," "Twelfth Night," and "She Stoops to Conquer." Influenced by the one-man shows of British actor Dickson Kerwin, Hyatt became interested in solo theatrical performance.

Hyatt attended the newly created Ryerson Institute of Technology (now Toronto Metropolitan University) in downtown Toronto, taking the Radio course. Over the next few years, he worked at CKPR in Fort William (Thunder Bay), then at CKFH in Toronto, and later at CHUM.

== Acting career ==
Hyatt's career began with the Earle Grey Players, precursor of the Ontario Stratford Festival, for their Summer Shakespeare Festivals in Toronto and Fall Tours. He performed the roles of Sebastian in "The Tempest," Hortensio in "The Taming of the Shrew," and Horatio in "Hamlet".

For the 1956-57 season he traveled to England, performing solo shows at the Arts Club Theatre in London and receiving encouragement and advice from Dame Flora Robson. On his return to Toronto, Hyatt pursued voice studies with Clara Salisbury Baker, and later with Gladys Shibley Mitchell, eventually sitting for the Licentiate exam in Speech Arts and Drama with Trinity College, London. While working in radio, Hyatt interviewed celebrities such as Ethel Waters, Sophie Tucker, Jeanette MacDonald, Arthur Rubinstein and Lauritz Melchior. It was after interviewing Melchior in New York (an interview subsequently aired on CBC Radio) that the heldentenor gave Hyatt the contacts which led to a New York agent for his solo shows. He stayed under New York management for ten years, living part of each year on Long Island.

In 1970, CHCH Television asked for twelve half-hour programs of material from the solo "A Company of One" shows Hyatt was performing in the United States. These were broadcast in 1971. The same year, Hyatt went on his first European tour, performing eleven shows in Switzerland, including Lucerne, Basel, and St. Gall, and five in the Soviet Union, including Moscow (Tchaikovsky Hall), and Leningrad (Philharmonic Hall). Over the next ten years, Hyatt did three more European tours.

== Solo shows ==
Hyatt's solo work consisted of programs of poetry, prose, and excerpts from plays, sometimes playing two or more characters. He also programmed selections from French and German literature, such as Goethe's "Egmont," and Rostand's "Cyrano de Bergerac."

The core of these solo programs was often a short story Hyatt would adapt and perform. They included Virginia Woolf's "The Duchess and the Jeweler," Katherine Mansfield's "The Doll's House," Willa Cather's "A Wagner Matinee," Eva Ibbotson's "The Great Carp Ferdinand," Truman Capote's "A Christmas Memory," and Somerset Maugham's "The Voice of the Turtle."

In Europe, Hyatt was sometimes requested to create programs featuring a single author, most notably, "Mad, Bad and Dangerous to Know" from Byron's letters and poems, and "Browning Portraits," a selection of the dramatic monologues.

== Company work ==
In Canada, Hyatt kept up his company work by appearing in "The Unreasonable Act of Julian Waterman" (Julian Waterman), "Endgame" (Hamm), "L'Auberge des Morts Subites" (L'Anglais), "The Imaginary Invalid" (Argan), "Move Over Mrs Markham" (Ronald), "Absurd Person Singular" (Ronald), "Painting Churches" (Gardner Church), "The Gin Game" (Weller), and "Jacob's Wake" (Skipper), among others. He worked with artists Virginia Reh, Jane Kean, Patricia Delves, Gerald Lenton, and Marion Gilsenan, and appeared at The Citadel Theatre (Edmonton), Hamilton Place, and, in Toronto, The Colonnade Theatre, and The Saint Lawrence Centre.

== Music ==
Hyatt was classically trained in voice and piano. In his early career, he performed in amateur variety shows as host and singer. Later, he appeared in cabaret-style performances featuring music from the 1920s, 30s, and 40s, with Clare Pengelly at the piano.

He created the spoken role of "He" in Michael J. Rudman's opera "Fall Legend," and appeared in the Canadian Opera Company's production of Ambroise Thomas's opera "Hamlet" in the mime role of the Player King.

Hyatt championed the revival of works specifically written for spoken voice with instrumental accompaniment. With composer-pianist Michael J. Rudman, he researched and performed compositions by Mozart, Schubert, Schumann, Liszt, Richard Strauss, and Sibelius, as well as commissioning and premiering new works. With orchestra or instrumental ensembles, he performed Stravinsky's "L'Histoire du Soldat," Walton's "Facade," and Rudman's "Merton Triptych."

== Later life ==
Hyatt had diabetes for most of this adult life. When his illness led him to retire from professional work, he continued acting in private homes.

For years, he'd given Christmas Shows as fundraisers for the historic Toronto house, The Grange. His last public solo show in May 2006 included selections from his long career. In August 2015, he suffered a series of strokes and died at Kensington Hospice in Toronto.
