= Jeroen van Veen =

Jeroen van Veen may refer to:

- Jeroen van Veen (bassist) (born 1974), Dutch bassist with the group Within Temptation
- Jeroen van Veen (pianist) (born 1969), Dutch classical pianist and composer
