= Friedrich Simon Bodenheimer =

German-Israeli entomologist (1897–1959)

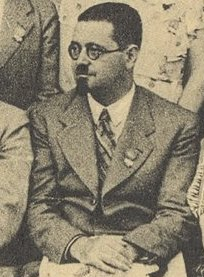
- Born: 6 June 1897; Cologne
- Died: 4 October 1959 (aged 62); London
- Occupation: Scientific collector
- Awards: Israel Prize (1954)

Friedrich Simon Bodenheimer or Shimon Fritz Bodenheimer (Hebrew: שמעון פריץ בודנהיימר; 6 June 1897 – 4 October 1959) was a German-born Israeli entomologist. He wrote two major works on the history of biology and is considered the founder of entomology in Israel.

== Early life ==
Friedrich, Frederick, or Fritz was born in Cologne to a wealthy Jewish family: his father, Max Bodenheimer, was a prominent lawyer who, together with Theodor Hertzl, was a co-founder of the World Zionist Organization. He was educated in Greek, Latin, literature, arts, mathematics, natural history, and calligraphy. At 17 he wrote a study of Sappho. In 1914 he joined the Ludwig-Maximilians-Universität München to study medicine but was interrupted by World War I where he served on the Eastern Front. He worked at the Hamburg natural history museum with Leonhard Lindinger and Ludwig Reh and it was during this time that he became interested in scale insects. He was influenced into entomology after coming across the works of Karl Escherich. He went to the University of Bonn for his Ph.D. on Tipula under Richard Hesse.

== Israel ==
A staunch Zionist, Bodenheimer emigrated to Mandate Palestine in 1922. Having graduated as a student of Richard Hesse at Bonn University, he took up the first post in entomology at an agricultural experimental station near Tel Aviv, and, from 1928, at the Hebrew University of Jerusalem. He was appointed head of the Institute of Zoology and Entomology.

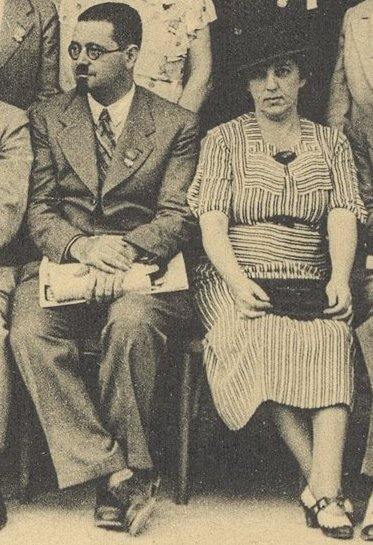
F. S. Bodenheimer and Mme. Bodenheimer at the International Congress of Entomology in Madrid, 1935

In 1923 he married Rachel, daughter of a Russian Zionist Menahem Ussishkin, and along with her examined pre-Linnean entomological works and wrote a history of entomology. In 1927 he researched Tamarisk manna in the Sinai desert, a possible source for the Biblical version, produced from insect honeydew. In 1936, Bodenheimer published The Biological Background of the Human Population Theory based on university lectures he gave in Tel Aviv.

In his career as a professor of zoology over the next 25 years, he wrote more than 420 works. Three of his major works include Insects as Human Food (1951), The History of Biology, An Introduction (1958) and Animal and Man in Bible Lands (1956). His Materialien zur Geschichte der Entomologie bis Linné ("Materials for the History of Entomology until Linne") was published by Wilhelm Junk in Berlin and copies of the book were burned by the Nazis. His manuscript on Citrus Entomology was saved and published after the war. He published an autobiography A Biologist in Israel in 1959. In the same year, he died in London from complications following an eye operation.

== Awards ==
In 1954, Bodenheimer was awarded the Israel Prize, in agriculture.
