= Canto Ostinato =

1976 musical work by Simeon Ten Holt

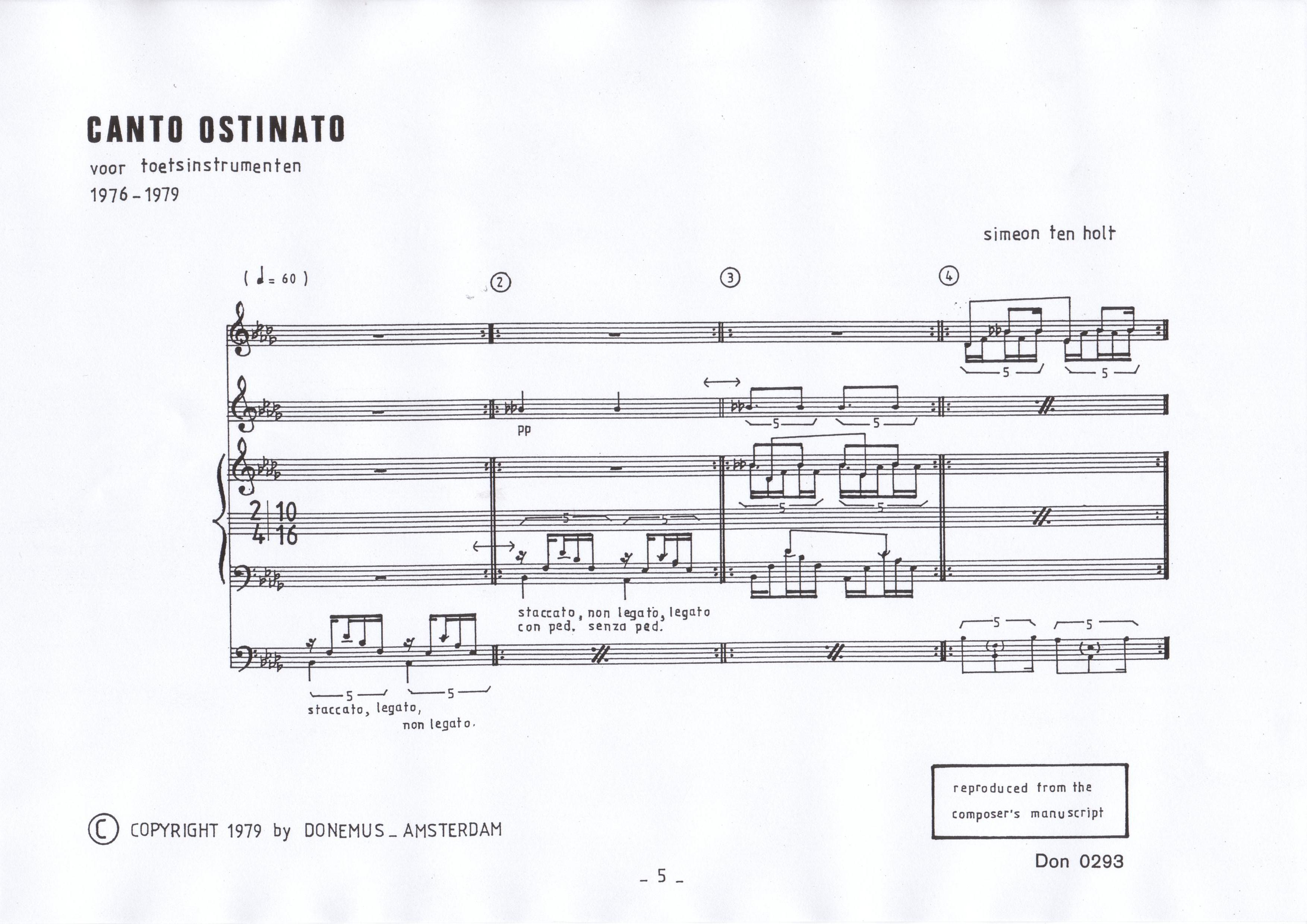
The first bars of Canto Ostinato

Canto Ostinato ("Obstinate Song" (as ostinato)) is a musical composition written by the Dutch composer Simeon ten Holt.

The piece was completed in 1976 and performed for the first time in 1979 and is by far his most popular and most performed work.

== Performance ==
The most remarkable aspect about this work is the amount of freedom that is given to the performer(s). The piece can be performed with different instruments and a different number of performers. Most commonly, it is played with either two or four pianos, but during the first performance in Bergen, North Holland in the Netherlands, the performers used three pianos and an electric organ. Other aspects that illustrate this freedom can be found in how this piece has been built up. The composer created a hundred and six small cells called 'sections' of a few bars, which can be played ad libitum and be repeated either one or many more times (some bridges excepted). Because of this build-up, performance may take from some two hours to more than a day.

The whole piece is at a steady tempo of ♩ = 60, marked so several times along the score. It starts with 2/4 that, given the fact that quintuplets are thoroughly used in this composition, is actually 10/16. The following is a complete representation of the structure of the work:

Structure of Canto Ostinato by Simeon ten Holt
Section number	Bars	Time signature	Different endings	Notes
1	1	2/4 (or 10/16)	—	
2	1	2/4	—	
3	1	2/4	—	
4	1	2/4	—	
5	1	2/4	—	
6	1	2/4	—	
7	1	2/4	—	This section is not repeated (Bridge)
8	2	2/4	—	
9	2	2/4	First and second endings	
10	2	2/4	First and second endings	
11	2	2/4	First and second endings	
12	2	2/4	First and second endings	
13	2	2/4	—	
13A	1	2/4	—	This section is not repeated (Bridge)
14	2	2/4	—	
14A	1	2/4	—	This section is not repeated (Bridge)
15	2	2/4	—	
15A	1	3/4	—	This section is not repeated (Bridge)
16	2	2/4	—	
17	5	2/4	—	
18	2	2/4	—	This section is not repeated (Bridge)
19	2	2/4	—	
20	5	2/4	—	
21	2	2/4	—	This section is not repeated (Bridge)
22	2	2/4	—	
23	2	2/4	—	
24	2	2/4	—	
25	2	2/4	First and second endings	
26	2	2/4	—	
27	2	2/4	—	
28	2	2/4	—	
29	2	2/4	—	
30	1	2/4	—	
31	1	2/4	—	
32	1	2/4	—	
32A	1	2/4	—	This section is not repeated (Bridge)
33	1	2/4	—	
34	1	2/4	—	
34A	1	3/4	—	This section is not repeated (Bridge)
35	1	2/4	—	
36	1	2/4	—	
37	1	2/4	—	
38	1	2/4	—	
39	1	2/4	—	
40	1	2/4	—	
41	1	1/4	—	
42	1	1/4	—	
43	1	1/4	—	
44	1	1/4	—	
45	1	1/4	—	
46	1	1/4	—	
47	1	1/4	—	
48	1	1/4	—	
49	1	1/4	—	
50	1	1/4	—	
51	1	1/4	—	
52	1	1/4	—	
53	1	1/4	—	
54	1	1/4	—	
55	1	1/4	—	
56	1	1/4	—	
57	1	1/4	—	
58	1	1/4	—	
59	1	1/4	—	
60	1	1/4	—	In this segment, each section is repeated four times, then all nine sections are repeated again ad libitum four times each
61	1	1/4	—	In this segment, each section is repeated four times, then all nine sections are repeated again ad libitum four times each
62	1	1/4	—	In this segment, each section is repeated four times, then all nine sections are repeated again ad libitum four times each
63	1	1/4	—	In this segment, each section is repeated four times, then all nine sections are repeated again ad libitum four times each
64	1	1/4	—	In this segment, each section is repeated four times, then all nine sections are repeated again ad libitum four times each
65	1	1/4	—	In this segment, each section is repeated four times, then all nine sections are repeated again ad libitum four times each
66	1	1/4	—	In this segment, each section is repeated four times, then all nine sections are repeated again ad libitum four times each
67	1	1/4	—	In this segment, each section is repeated four times, then all nine sections are repeated again ad libitum four times each
68	1	1/4	—	In this segment, each section is repeated four times, then all nine sections are repeated again ad libitum four times each
69	1	2/4	—	
70	1	2/4	—	
71	1	2/4	—	
72	1	2/4	—	
73	1	2/4	—	
74	9	2/4	—	
75	4	2/4	—	This section is not repeated
76	4	2/4	—	This section is not repeated
77	4	2/4	—	This section is not repeated
78	2	2/4	—	
79	4	Three bars in 2/4, one bar in 3/4	—	This section is not repeated
80	9	2/4	—	This section is a non-repeated encore of section 74
81	2	2/4	—	
82	2	2/4	—	
83	4	2/4	First and second endings	
84	2	2/4	—	
85	1	3/4	—	(Bridge)
86	1	2/4	—	Transition (Crescendo)
87	1	2/4	—	Transition (Diminuendo)
88A	1	2/4	—	In section 88, the fourth piano plays different cells ad libitum
88A (Variation I)	1	2/4	—	
88A (Variation II)	1	2/4	—	
88B	2	2/4	—	
88A	1	2/4	—	
88B	2	2/4	—	
88A (Variation)	1	2/4	—	
88B (Variation)	2	2/4	—	
88A	1	2/4	—	
88A	1	2/4	—	
88B	2	2/4	—	
88A	1	2/4	—	
88C	2	2/4	—	
88A	1	2/4	—	
88B	2	2/4	—	
88A	1	2/4	—	
88C	2	2/4	—	
88C (Variation)	2	2/4	—	
88A	1	2/4	—	
88B	2	2/4	—	
88A	1	2/4	—	
88E	1	2/4	—	
88A	1	2/4	—	
88B	2	2/4	—	
88E	1	2/4	—	
88A	1	2/4	—	
88B	2	2/4	—	
88E (Variation)	2	2/4	—	
88A	1	2/4	—	
88F	4	2/4	—	
88A	2	2/4	—	
88F (Variation)	4	2/4	—	
88A	1	2/4	—	
88B	2	2/4	—	
88C	2	2/4	—	
88C (Variation)	2	2/4	—	
88A	1	2/4	—	
88E	1	2/4	—	
88E (Variation)	2	2/4	—	
88G	2	2/4	—	This section is not repeated
88H	1	2/4	—	
88E	1	2/4	—	This section is not repeated (Bridge)
88A	1	2/4	—	
88B	2	2/4	—	
88C	2	2/4	—	
88C (Variation)	2	2/4	—	
88G	2	2/4	—	This section is not repeated
88H	1	2/4	—	
88I	2	2/4	—	
88G	2	2/4	—	This section is not repeated
88H	1	2/4	—	
88I	2	2/4	—	This section is not repeated (Bridge)
88K	4	2/4	—	
88F	2	2/4	—	
88G	2	2/4	—	This section is not repeated
88H	1	2/4	—	
88I	2	2/4	—	
88F	2	2/4	—	
88G	2	2/4	—	This section is not repeated
88H	1	2/4	—	
No number	1	3/4	—	This section is not repeated (Bridge)
89	1	2/4	—	Transition (Crescendo)
90	1	2/4	—	Transition (Diminuendo)
91A	1	2/4	—	In section 91, the fourth piano plays different cells ad libitum
91B	2	2/4	—	
91A	1	2/4	—	
91B	2	2/4	—	
91A	1	2/4	—	
91C	2	2/4	—	
91A	1	2/4	—	
91B	2	2/4	—	
91A	1	2/4	—	
91C	2	2/4	—	
91D	2	2/4	—	
91A	1	2/4	—	
91B	2	2/4	—	
91A	1	2/4	—	
91E	1	2/4	—	
91A	1	2/4	—	
91F	2	2/4	—	
91A	1	2/4	—	
91B	2	2/4	—	
91C	2	2/4	—	
91G	2	2/4	—	
91C	2	2/4	—	
91F	2	2/4	—	
91A	1	2/4	—	
91B	2	2/4	—	
91H	2	2/4	—	This section is not repeated
91I	1	2/4	—	
91E	1	2/4	—	
91A	1	2/4	—	
91B	2	2/4	—	
91H	2	2/4	—	This section is not repeated
91I	1	2/4	—	
No number	5	Four bars in 2/4, one bar in 1/4	—	This section is not repeated (Bridge)
92	1	2/4	—	
93	1	2/4	—	
94	1	2/4	—	
95	9	2/4	—	
96	4	2/4	—	This section is not repeated
97	4	2/4	—	This section is not repeated
98	2	2/4	—	This section is not repeated
99	2	2/4	—	This section is not repeated
100	2	2/4	—	
101	4	Three bars in 2/4, one bar in 3/4	—	This section is not repeated
102	9	2/4	—	This section is a non-repeated encore of section 95
103	2	2/4	—	
104	2	2/4	—	
105	4	2/4	First and second endings	
106	2	2/4	—	

The piece is regularly performed live in the Netherlands with changing players and instruments, ranging from those with four pianos or one or more different instruments, to those played by a solo musician. A performance took place in Utrecht Centraal station during the evening rush hour in the autumn of 2007, and a couple of performances have taken place with the carillon of the Dom Tower of Utrecht, in August 2009 and August 2010. It has also been performed in several public spaces all around the Netherlands, such as the Groningen railway station.

== Style ==
This piece is considered to be minimal in origin, because of the repetitive nature of the piece, but there is some discussion on this subject. Ten Holt usually uses the term 'genetic code' to describe his work, probably because of the typical build-up of the piece. As opposed to a high percentage of modern classical music that is not tonal and/or consonant, Canto Ostinato contains tonal harmonies and does not become (very) dissonant. Another typical aspect is the fact that one can hear the same or similar bass figures and harmonies throughout the piece, which explains the title. If one word would have to catch the essence of Canto Ostinato, one could use "meditative", as the different sections are similar, but generate different emotional reactions.

Examples of pieces written by Ten Holt in roughly the same way are Lemniscaat (1983), Horizon (1985), Incantatie IV, and Méandres (1997), none of which have become as popular as Canto Ostinato.

== Recordings ==
The first recording of Simeon ten Holt's 1979 magnum opus "Canto Ostinato" released as a triple album off-label, then reissued on Donemus. Performed on four pianos by Arielle Vernède, Cees van Zeeland, Gene Carl and Gerard Bouwhuis at the Music Centre of Vredenburg, Utrecht on February 12th 1984. They performed Canto in ‘The Gala of New Contemporary Music’ 1985, broadcast on Television live from the Concertgebouw in Amsterdam.

Many different recordings of Canto Ostinato are now available. The CD recording made by Kees Wieringa and Polo de Haas, published in 1996 by Emergo Classics, received Gold status, which means that more than 10,000 copies were sold (the actual number lies above 15,000). That is rather rare for modern classical-music performance CDs and especially for Dutch composers, who usually do not generate that much popularity. Another recording that is relatively popular is the four piano version of the Piano Ensemble, featuring Irene Russo, Fred Oldenburg, Sandra van Veen, and Jeroen van Veen and released by Brilliant Classics. One particular record was made by Ivo Janssen, released in 2009, which has a total length of around 60 minutes, and is a one-man, one-piano performance of the original composition. Ten Holt was the official sponsor of the record of "Canto Ostinato" by the Dutch Rondane Quartet published in 2010.

Versions using other instruments than piano include solo organ (performed by Aart Bergwerff in 2007), solo harp (by Assia Cunego, Italy, in 2009), string quartet (by Matangi Quartet, 2020) and solo marimba (Peter Elbertse, 2012). Cunego's performance inspired Dutch pianist Ivo Janssen to record a one-man version for solo piano in 2009. Cello Octet Amsterdam performed their version on eight celli in a subway tunnel in 2012, a studio recording was released in 2013. Other versions use combinations of piano, organ, marimba, carillon, and other instruments.

On October 23, 2017, this piece was performed for the first time in Saratov, Russia, at the opening of the II International Festival of Contemporary Music "Art Modern" in a version for organ, vibraphone, marimba, double bass and piano. Performers: Olga Kiywovski (organ), Elena Pekarskaya (vibraphone), Anastasia Glavatskikh (marimba), Dmitry Tolochkov (double bass), Vasily Igonin (piano). The concert took place in the Great Hall of the Saratov Conservatory.

In 2024 a version for solo harp was recorded by Gwyneth Wentink.

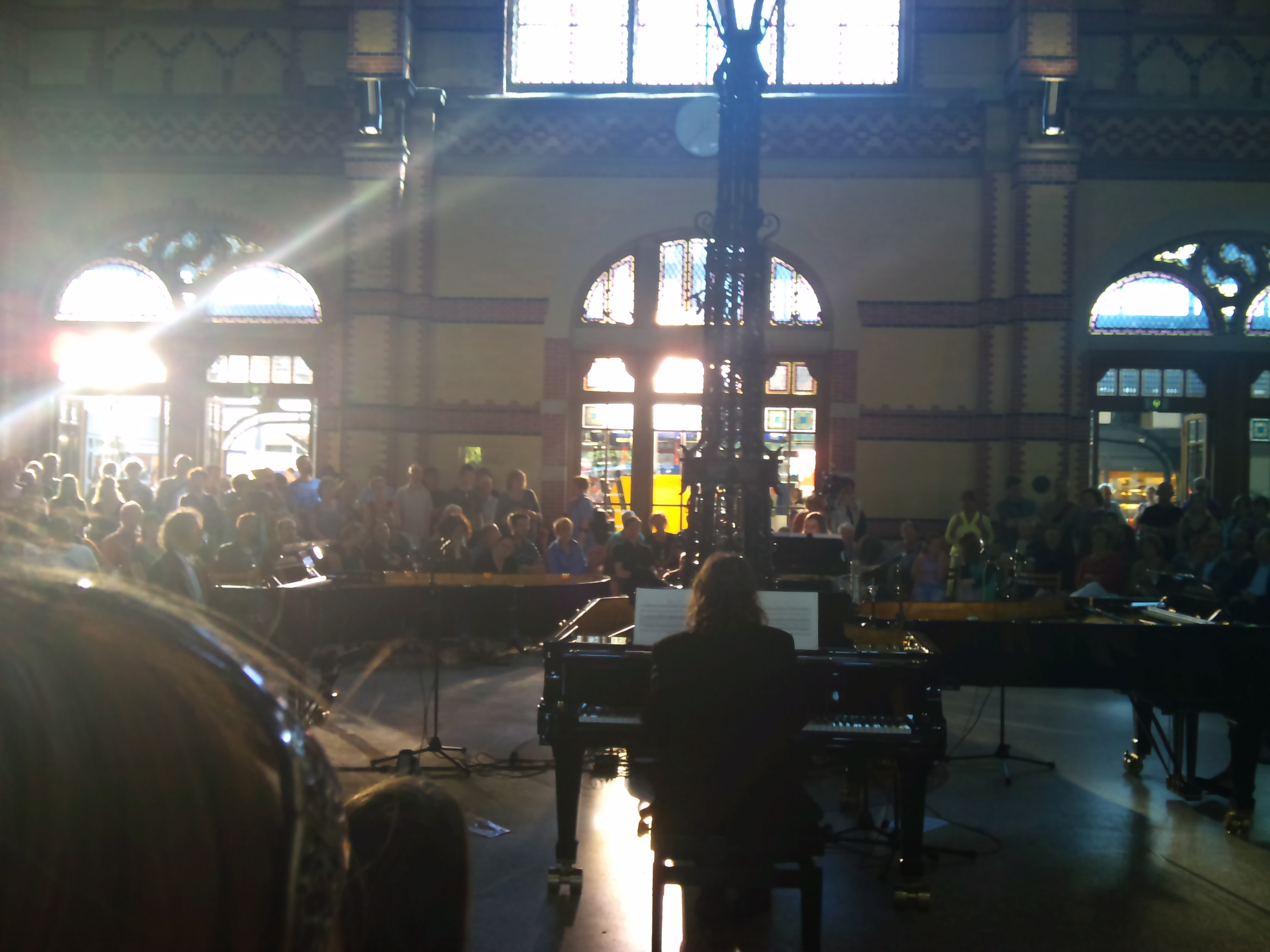
Canto Ostinato performed in Groningen railway station (2010)

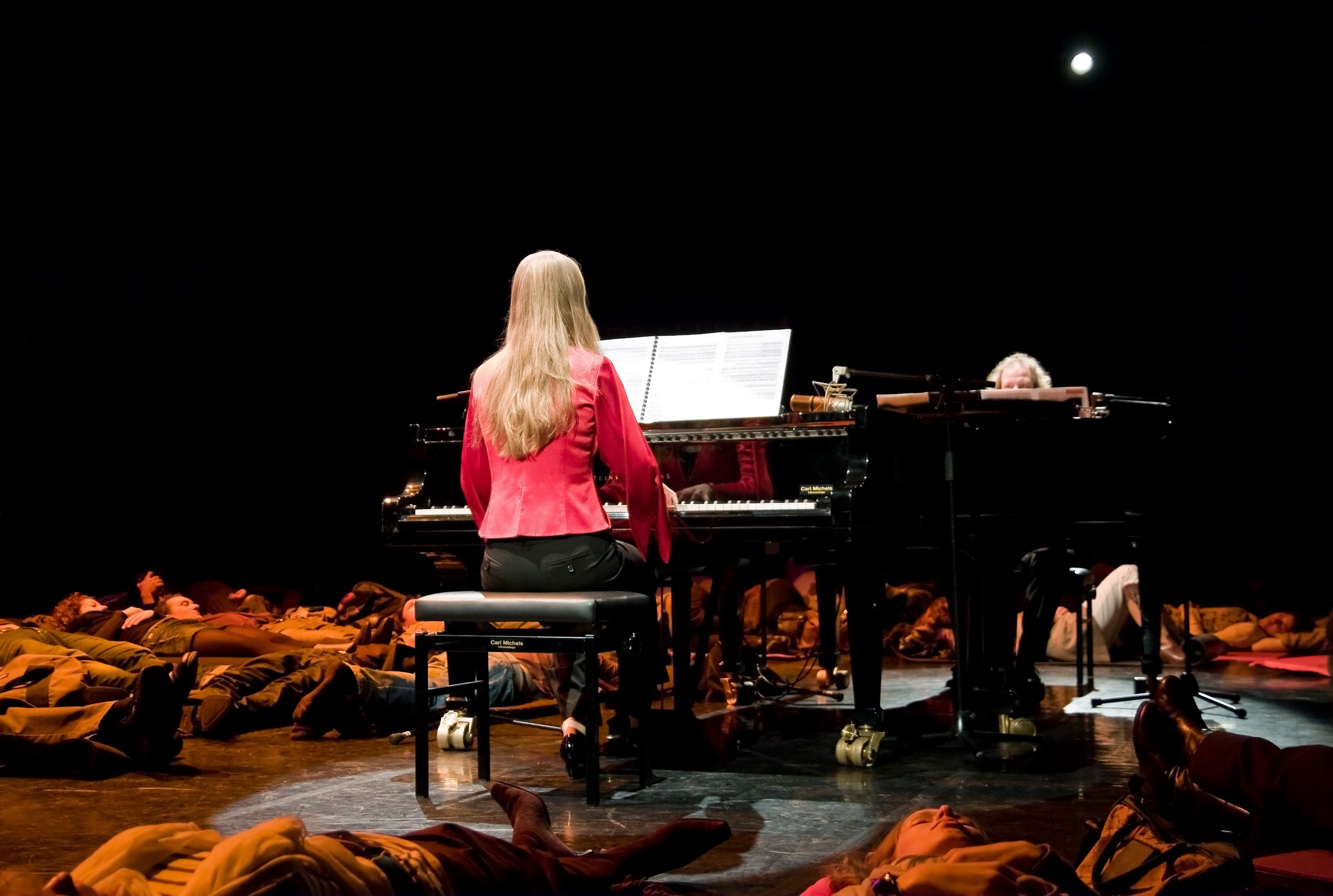
Canto Ostinato performed in The Hague (2011)

== Documentary ==
Dutch documentary maker Ramón Gieling made the documentary "Over Canto" ("About Canto") about this piece. This documentary has been promoted in the Dutch TV-show De Wereld Draait Door.
