= Jakob van Domselaer =

Dutch composer (1890–1960)

- Born: Jakob van Domselaer; 15 April 1890; Nijkerk, Netherlands
- Died: 5 January 1960 (aged 69)

Jakob van Domselaer (15 April 1890 in Nijkerk, Gelderland – 5 January 1960) was a Dutch composer.

Domselaer was born at Nijkerk, Netherlands. In 1912, he traveled to Paris where he met the Dutch painter Piet Mondrian (1872–1944), eventually becoming a part of Mondrian's artistic circle known as "De Stijl." Domselaer's piano suite Proeven van Stijlkunst (Experiments in Artistic Style, 1913–17) represented the first attempt to apply principles of Neo-Plasticism to music, and Mondrian asserted that pieces were created under the influence of the plus-minus painting he created around the year 1915 (Blotkamp 1994, 159). This austere, mathematically based music represents an important but as yet unacknowledged precedent to minimalism and has been little performed or recorded. He died at Bergen, Netherlands.

Domselaer's students have included the Dutch composers Nico Schuyt (Wennekes 2001) and Simeon ten Holt (Ramaer 2001).

At the Berlage Concourse in 1988, the Dutch pianist Kees Wieringa was one of the prize winners, playing piano music by Domselaer. He released a recording featuring the music of Domselaer in 1994 (DO Records CD, DR 001).

Domselaer married Maaike Middelkoop, with whom he had three children. His son, Jaap van Domselaer (1923–1944), was a promising young poet when he was shot while trying to escape from German-occupied Netherlands to the liberated zone in 1944 (Smit 2011). His daughter, Matie van Domselaer, married Constant Nieuwenhuys on 13 July 1942 (Anon. 2012–2018), and later Asger Jorn in 1950 (Anon. n.d.).

== Recordings ==
- Recording by Kees Wieringa
- Recording on the Donemus Foundation's Composer's Voice label
