= Jeroen van Veen (pianist) =

Dutch classical pianist and composer (born 1969)

Jeroen van Veen (born May 1969 in Herwen en Aerdt, Gelderland) is a Dutch classical pianist and composer. He has worked both as a soloist and in collaboration with other pianists. Some of his collaborations include duo work with his brother Maarten and his (ex)wife Sandra.

== Short biography ==
Jeroen Van Veen studied at the Utrechts Conservatorium (HKU) with Alwin Bär and Håkon Austbø. Since year 1988 he has played concerts and recitals throughout Europe and North America and recorded over 190 CDs for Mirasound, Koch, Naxos, Brilliant Classics and his own label piano. Van Veen's compositions are primarily solo piano works and could largely be described as minimal music. His latest recordings have also focused on minimal music, including a 9 CD Minimal Piano Collection box set, somewhat dominated by the music of Philip Glass, the complete piano music of George Crumb, and a collaboration on recording all of Steve Reich's Chamber music.

Among other functions, Van Veen is the director of Van Veen Productions , Piano Mania , and the Simeon ten Holt Foundation . He is also the artistic director of the Murray Dranoff Two Piano Competition , based in Miami, where he and his brother Marten van Veen were prize winners in 1995. In 2016 Van Veen received the NPO Radio 4 award; Van Veen was praised for his 'out of the box' programming and for finding new ways to attract a new audience for classical music.

== Extended biography ==
"Dutch pianist and composer Jeroen van Veen, the leading exponent of minimalism in Holland today, Alan Swanson (Fanfare)"

Jeroen Van Veen started playing the piano at the age of 7. He studied at the Utrechts Conservatorium with Alwin Bär and Håkon Austbö. In 1993 he passed the Performing Artists' Exam. Van Veen has played with orchestras conducted by Howard Williams (Adams), Péter Eötvös (Zimmermann) in Amsterdam, Utrecht, Vienna, and Budapest and the United States with Neal Stulberg (Mozart & Bartók) and Robert Craft (Stravinsky) He has played recitals in Austria, Belgium, Canada, England, France, Germany, Hungary, Italy, Russia & the USA.

Van Veen attended master classes with Claude Helffer, Hans-Peter & Volker Stenzl, and Roberto Szidon. He was invited to several festivals, a.o. the Reder Piano Festival (1988), Festival der Kunsten in Bad Gleichenberg (1992), Wien Modern (1993), Holland Dance Festival (1998) Lek Art Festival (1996–2007). Van Veen recorded for major Dutch Radio- and Television companies like AVRO, NOS, IKON, NCRV, TROS/Internet, WTBC-TV & Radio (Florida, U.S.A.), and Moscow Television. In 1992, Van Veen recorded his first CD with his brother Maarten as the internationally recognized Piano duo Van Veen. In 1995 Piano duo Van Veen made their debut in the United States. They were prizewinners in the prestigious 4th International Murray Dranoff Two Piano Competition in Miami, Florida. After this achievement, they toured the United States and Canada many times. The documentary Two Pianos One Passion (nominated for an Emmy Award in 1996) documents them as a duo.

Besides performing, Jeroen is co-founder and artistic director of the International Student Piano Competition, which is held in Utrecht every two years. In 1995 Jeroen Van Veen founded Van Veen & Van Veen (Van Veen & Co.), a piano duo with Sandra Van Veen. As such, they mainly perform music for multiple pianos by the Dutch composer Simeon ten Holt. Furthermore, in 1999 Van Veen initiated a concert series Pianova in the Concertgebouw, Amsterdam. Besides his career as a solo pianist, Van Veen also participates in the following ensembles: Piano Ensemble, The International Piano Quartet, The Simeon Quartet, Piano Mania, DJ Piano, and Jeroen van Veen & Friends.

The various compositions by Van Veen could be described as Minimal Music with different faces, and crossovers of jazz, blues, soundscape, Avant-garde, techno, trance, and pop music. Currently, Van Veen is director of Van Veen Productions, Chairman of the Simeon ten Holt Foundation, Culemborg Cultural Foundation, Pianomania Foundation, and artistic director of several music festivals in Culemborg, Utrecht and Veldhoven. He is active in the International Utrecht Student Piano Competition and the Murray Dranoff Two Piano Competition. Over the last 25 years, Van Veen recorded more than 200 CDs for several labels (Mirasound, Koch, Naxos, Brilliant Classics) and his label PIANO.

The piano playing in Stravinsky's Les Noces surpassed that of the distinguished musicians in the composer's recording according to The New York Times. The recording of Erik Satie's music for piano four hands with Sandra van Veen was rated on Classics Today with 10 out of 10 for artistic quality and 10 out of 10 for sound quality and said it to be "...a must for Satie fans."

== Discography ==
Piece(s)/Title	Record label	Composer(s)	Performers	Number of CDs
Minimal Multiple Piano Collection	Brilliant Classics CD 9171	Various	Jeroen van Veen & Friends	11
Complete Multiple Piano Works (Canto Ostinato, Horizon, Lemniscaat, Incantatie IV, Meandres, Shadow nor Prey).	Brilliant Classics CD 7795	Simeon ten Holt	Piano Ensemble: Irene Russo, Fred Oldenburg, Jeroen and Sandra van Veen	11
Canto Ostinato	Brilliant Classics CD 9261	Simeon ten Holt	Piano Ensemble: Irene Russo, Fred Oldenburg, Jeroen and Sandra van Veen	2
Minimal Piano Collection	Brilliant Classics CD 8551	Various	Jeroen van Veen	9
Tubular Bells, Part I, version for two pianos and two synthesizers and version for four grand pianos	Brilliant CD 8812	Mike Oldfield	Piano Ensemble: Elizabeth & Marcel Bergmann, Sandra & Jeroen van Veen	1
Complete works for piano four hands	Brilliant Classics CD 9129	Erik Satie	Jeroen & Sandra van Veen	1
Pianoduo van Veen	Mirasound	Various	Jeroen & Maarten van Veen	1
Two Pianos, One Passion	Dranoff	Various	Jeroen & Maarten van Veen	1
Oranje en de Muziek	vanveenproductions	Various	a.o. Tamara Rumiantsev and Jeroen van Veen	2
Les Noces	Koch International Classics 7514	Igor Stravinsky	Philharmonia Orchestra, Simon Joly Chorus, Tristan Fry Percussion Ensemble, International Piano Quartet (Elisabeth, Marcel Bergmann and Jeroen, Maarten van Veen), Robert Craft	1
Les Noces	Naxos Records	Igor Stravinsky	Philharmonia Orchestra, Simon Joly Chorus, Tristan Fry Percussion Ensemble, International Piano Quartet (Elisabeth, Marcel Bergmann and Jeroen, Maarten van Veen), Robert Craft	1
In naam van Oranje	Momu	Various	Tamara Rumiantsev and Jeroen van Veen	1

=== Produced at Van Veen Productions Label PIANO ===
Piece(s)/Title	Record label	Composer(s)	Performers	Number of CDs
Canto Ostinato	PP 9600	Simeon ten Holt	Sandra & Jeroen van Veen	1
Incantatie IV	PP 9800	Simeon ten Holt	Sandra & Jeroen van Veen and Tamara Rumiantsev	2
Minimal Piano Works Volume I	PP 9910	Various	Jeroen van Veen	9
Canto Ostinato for two pianos and two marimbas	PP 2010	Simeon ten Holt	Sandra & Jeroen Van Veen (piano), Esther Doornink and Peter Elbertse (marimba)	1
Minimal Piano Works Volume II	PP 2011	Various	Sandra & Jeroen van Veen, Elizabeth & Marcel Bergmann, Tamara Rumiantsev	11
International Students Piano Competition, Live recording in Utrecht	PP 2012	Various		1
Culemborg City Soundscape	PP 2015	Marcel Bergmann and Jeroen van Veen	Elbertse (percussion)	1
Shadow nor Prey, Hymn to a great City	PP 2013	Simeon ten Holt/Arvo Pärt	Fred Oldenburg and Jeroen van Veen	1
Love Me (participant in the Netherlands Eurovision Song Contest 2004)	PP 2017	Judith Jobse	Judith Jobse (vocals), Jeroen van Veen (piano)	1
Chamber Orchestra of the Novosibirsk Philharmonic Society, playing Mozart, Piazolla, Tchaikovsky and more	PP 2022	Various	Chamber Orchestra Novosibirsk	1
Piano and Hang	no label	Peter Elbertse and Jeroen van Veen	Peter Elbertse (Hang) and Jeroen van Veen (piano)	1

== List of works ==
- Culemborg City Soundscape, (2002) (on CD)
- Weeshuis Soundscape (2005) (on tape)
- Words on Kindness, for 2 pianos and 5 voices (2006) (premiered 2006)
- 12 Minimal Preludes, BOOK I, (1999–2003) (on CD 8551) for piano
- 12 Minimal Preludes, BOOK II, (2004–2006) (on CD 8551) for piano
- In de Doelen, leadermuziek (2006) on DVD
- Tango for Amalia, Alexia & Ariane (2007) (premiered 2007) for Piano four hands
- Incanto nr 1 for two pianos (2011) on CD
- Snake it easy for 6 pianos
- Draughts for multiple pianos
- "Novosibirsk Chamber Orchestra, A. Polishchuk with Jeroen van Veen (A piano quintet composition of Antonín Dvořák, arranged for piano and String Orchestra)
- Pianomania, piano improvisations on 3 pianos.
- "Minimal Preludes, Book III & Book IV" (2007–2013)
- "NLXL" 2011
- "Incanto" II, III & IV
- "Slash" for Itzik Galili

== Other official functions ==
- Van Veen Productions, (1995-) director
- Stichting Ligconcert, (2005-) artistic director
- International Students Piano Competition, Utrecht (1994-) artistic director
- Lek Art Foundation, Culemborg (1994–2007) artistic director
- Simeon ten Holt Foundation, Culemborg (2004-) chair
- Culemborg Cultureel, Culemborg (2005–2007) chair
- Ostinato Festival, Veldhoven (2006-) artistic director
- Piano Mania Foundation, Culemborg (2006-) chair
- Dranoff Two Piano Foundation Miami, artistic director development (2002-)
- RVT De Gelderlandfabriek,(2023-)
- Rijnmond Muziekprijs,(2021-)
