= Kees Wieringa =

Kees Wieringa is a Dutch pianist, composer, writer and cultural entrepreneur. His mission is to inspire and connect people through art and culture. He came to prominence for his performances of the Dutch composers Jakob van Domselaer, Daniel Ruyneman and Simeon ten Holt.

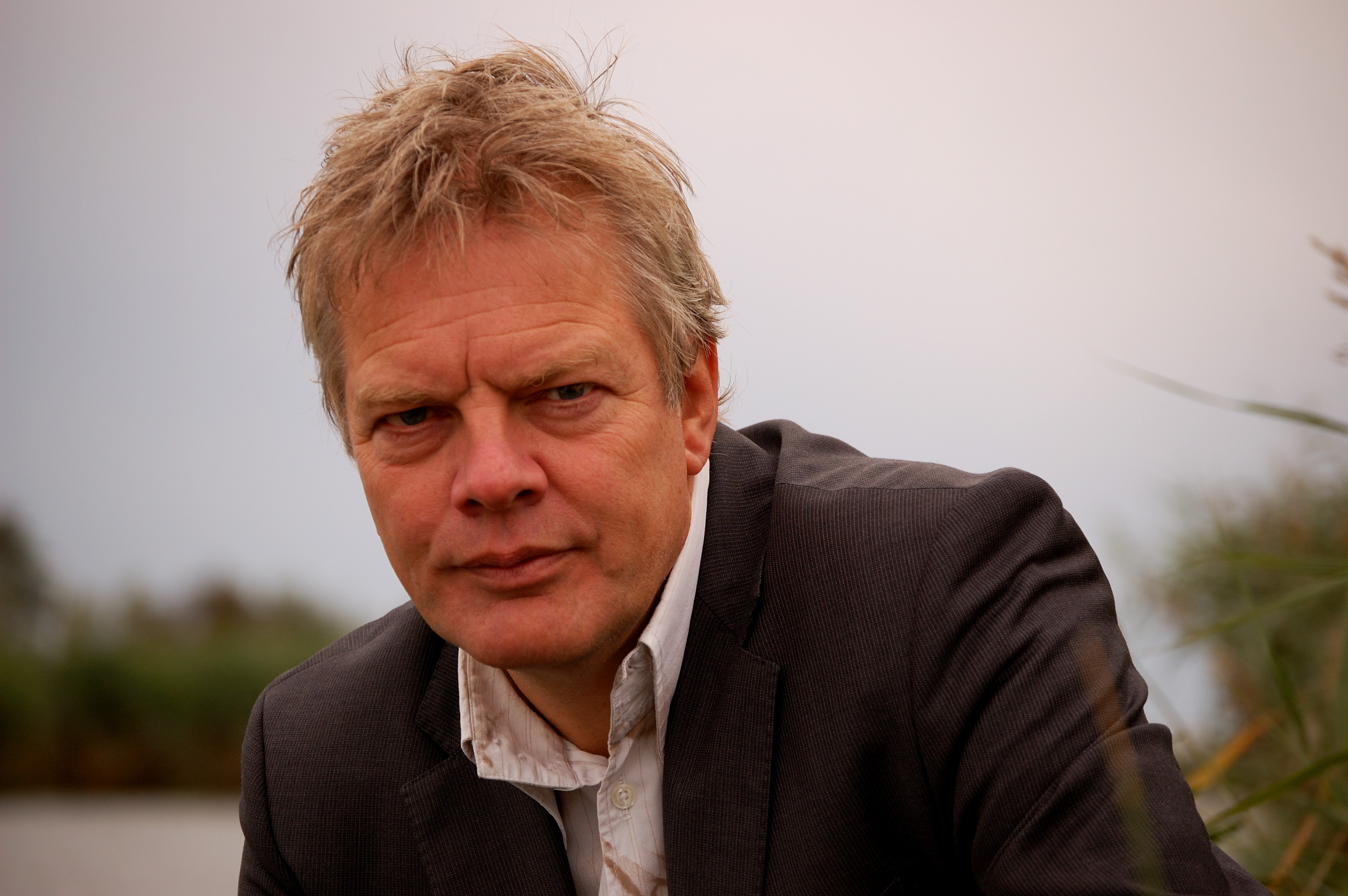
Kees Wieringa

== Biography ==
Kees Wieringa graduated from the Amsterdam Conservatory in Amsterdam in 1986. He has built an international career over the years with his piano recitals and compositions. He is known as an ambassador for the work of the Bergen composer Simeon ten Holt, and for supporting the music of Jakob van Domselaer Wieringa is someone looking for an adventure: "If there is a review over 'Wieringa reliable pianist' he feels terrible." Wieringa has received the award for original repertoire during the Berlage Competition for Proeven van Stijlkunst (1913–1917) by Jakob van Domselaer. This work consists of nine compositions performed by Van Domselaer and Nelly van Doesburg during meetings of members the Bauhaus and DaDa art movements. The pieces represent the music written according to the ideas of the artistic movement called De Stijl (The Style).

== Composer ==
In 2010, Kees Wieringa premiered the opera Drebbel. The main character of the piece is the Alkmaar-educated inventor Cornelis Drebbel (1572–1633) (performed by rock singer Thé Lau), who was interested in themes of alchemy and spiritualism. "Wieringa was inspired by the early Baroque music with its polyphonic while emotional musical lines. Composers such as Monteverdi and Handel sound along while today intervals, chords and rhythms can be heard, reminding the minimal music of Philip Glass."

== Entrepreneur ==
In the summer of 2007, the Mijzenfestival took place for the first time. Kees Wieringa explained that: "West Friezen are hard workers, but they are not sufficiently aware of the beauty of their habitat. I hope to change that, because I am convinced that you can change the world by improving your own environment. I wanted 'something' to do with music and theater, with the Mijzenpolder as a backdrop. I wanted to contribute to the happiness of the people who live here. It inspired me to organize the first Mijzenfestival." Wieringa also formed the production company 2Kusten and is its artistic director. The three major theaters in North Holland united in this production to improve the infrastructure of their theatre arts.

== Museum director ==
In 2008, Wieringa was appointed director of the Provadja Theatre and as managing director of arts and cultural Center Yxie in the Netherlands. The centre was a place where people could learn about visual arts, film, theatre, music and poetry in the form of an ongoing festival that was characterized by an interdisciplinary program on varying themes. Kees Wieringa was director of the Kranenburgh Museum in Bergen, and since 2016 has been the director of the Sheikh Faisal Bin Qassim Al Thani Museum in Qatar. Wieringa has also organised and curated an exhibition 'The Majlis - Cultures in Dialogue ' together with UNESCO. It was featured in Paris, Vienna, Madrid, and Malaga.

== Publication ==
About Inshallah: In 2016, Kees Wieringa is appointed Director of the Al-Thani Museum in the desert state of Qatar, where financial means are as limitless as the influence of the sheik. As he struggles to establish himself in closed Qatari society, he becomes progressively entangled in the web of the capricious sheik and his progeny. A novice to the culture, the director finds himself embroiled in intrigue, facing arms dealers, art smugglers and clashes of conscience. What appears to be a dream-job opportunity swiftly degenerates into a disconcerting ordeal. Inshallah lifts the veil on an incredibly rich Gulf state that will host the 2022 FIFA World Cup. He tells the tale of a man thrown back on himself in a desert expanse, subjected to an important self-revelation.

== Tours ==
In 2023, Kees Wieringa made a concert tour through the United States of America. Started in Hawaii, with concerts in Maui, Los Angeles and New York. He played music of the Romantic period and contemporary composers. In September 2023, he came back to New York to participate in the Village Trip festival 16 .

== Compositions ==
- C in Klein (1996), elektronische muziek
- Het Monument (1999), elektronische muziek – 41'47"
- Vluchten (1999), muziek voor slagwerk, ud en zang – 49'35"
- Touch (1999), elektronische muziek en piano – 71'30"
- Wit (1999), elektronische muziek – 8'10"
- Zwart (1999), elektronische muziek – 8'30"
- Blauw (1999), elektronische muziek – 32'
- Petersburg, een stadscompositie (2001), elektronische muziek – 60'
- Tokyo, een stadscompositie (2001)
- Winterslaap (2001)
- Theo van Doesburg (2002)
- Midas (2003)
- Opening GCO (2004)
- BAG (2005)
- Esfahan (2006)
- Zorro (2006)

== Discography ==
- Jurriaan Andriessen – Portret van Hedwig (Do Records 008)
- Boudewijn Buckinx – In De Buurt Van Neptunus (Cassa Nova REC CNR 950821)
- Alvin Curran – For Cornelius (Do Records 009)
- Theo van Doesburg (Do Records 005)
- Jakob van Domselaer – Pianoconcerten no.1 en 2 (NM Classics)
- Jakob van Domselaer – Pianomuziek (Do Records 001)
- Een Nieuwe Lente (Beethoven/Liszt) (Do Records 007)
- Morton Feldman Session – DVD (Do Records 201)
- Morton Feldman – Untitled Composition (Attacca 9160–3)
- Simeon ten Holt – Canto Ostinato (EtCetera Records 1367)
- Simeon ten Holt – Incantatie IV (CDJD 18 SH)
- Simeon ten Holt – Lemniscaat (CLAR 53317–19)
- Simeon ten Holt – Méandres (NM Classics 92106)
- Simeon ten Holt – Natalon in E /Cyclus aan de Waanzin (CDJD 13 SH)
- Simeon ten Holt – Soloduiveldans no.2 (WVH 055)
- Simeon ten Holt – Soloduiveldans no.3 en Eadem Sed Aliter (Do Records 003)
- De Ploeg, Daniel– Ruyneman en zijn tijd (Do Records 002)
- Nederlandse Sonatines voor piano 1 (Do Records 004)
- Nederlandse Sonatines voor piano 2 (Do Records 006)
- Jacob ter Veldhuis – Diverso Il Tempo (BVHaast)
- Jacob ter Veldhuis – Heartbreakers (Emergo Classics)
- Jacob ter Veldhuis – Shining City (Basta 3091 742)
- Jacob ter Veldhuis – Suites of Lux (Basta 3091 752)
- Kees Wieringa – Zorro (Do Records 010)
- Kees Wieringa – BAG (Do Records 011)
- Canto Ostinato Revisited (Do Records 014)

=== Albums ===
Album title	Release date	Charting in the Dutch Album Top 100			Comments
Album title	Release date	Date of entry	Highest	Weeks	Comments
Simeon ten Holt – Canto ostinato	2012	01-12-2012	83	1*	met Polo de Haas

== Sources ==
- Ramaer, Huib. 2001. Holt, Simeon ten. The New Grove Dictionary of Music and Musicians, second edition, edited by Stanley Sadie and John Tyrrell. London: Macmillan Publishers.
