= Reh Jones =

American YouTube personality (born 1984)

- Born: Reh'quin Jones; December 21, 1984 (age 41); Waco, Texas, U.S.
- Education: University of North Texas
- Known for: YouTube personality, Owner of AnimeHorizon

YouTube information
- Channel: Cookin' Amigo
- Years active: 2014–present
- Subscribers: 14.9 thousand
- Views: 1.7 million
- Last updated: 20 October 2025

Reh'quin Jones (December 21, 1984) is an American YouTube personality and owner and creator of the Japanese anime website, AnimeHorizon (formally known as Keiichi's Anime Kingdom), and producer of the dubbing studio Ippai Productions from Waco, Texas, United States.

== Biography ==
=== Early life ===
Reh Jones was born in Waco, Texas on (December 21, 1984) and at the age of three, moved to Houston, Texas, where his childhood education was obtained. He is a cousin to former NFL cornerback Denard Walker.

=== AnimeHorizon (1999) ===
At the age of fifteen, Jones began to study various programming languages and desired to create a small project. It was originally planned to be a small collaboration of pictures and fan art of one of his favorite Japanese cartoons, Sailor Moon, but it slowly began to become one of the first downloadable anime fan sites obtaining nearly 1,000 hits per day.

Today, the website has become more broad and now covers over 150 Japanese animations. Since this change, the website has been subject to several criticisms and legal battles with production companies throughout the United States. In 2003, Cloverway requested removal of the Sailor Moon series as it was licensed for production in English. After non-disclosed communication between the parties, AnimeHorizon agreed to remove the English version of the series until licensing expired. AnimeHorizon now removes all licensed material and is only allowed to offer shows which are subtitled by fans. This caused further criticism for the site and a drastic loss of visitors, dropping over 400,000 slots in Alexa Internet traffic ranking, but the site continues to serve a humble number of visitors.

=== Ippai Productions (2006) ===
During the summer of 2006, Ippai Productions (formerly known as Kyo to Ashita Studios), a voice acting and dubbing studio was created. The studio was formed primarily by the staff of AnimeHorizon and began production of an English version of Sailor Moon under the name of Kyo to Ashita Studios. Due to unforeseen casting issues, the project became delayed until Summer of 2007. During the resumed production of the series, a conflict of interest occurred with the co-owner of Kyo to Ashita Studios, which resulted in a name change to Ippai Productions.

In early 2008, Ippai Productions released its first episode of the Sailor Moon StarS series to the public. Since its release, the studio has become inactive and the status of the project and the studio is unknown.

=== Cookin’ Amigo (2014) ===
On December 31, 2014, Jones created the YouTube channel Cookin’ Amigo. He uses the channel as a platform to provide instructional how-to videos for preparing various dishes.

=== Education ===
Jones attended University of North Texas from 2005–2008, where he served as the first president of the school's Japanese Language Exchange club, and obtained a dual bachelor's degree in mathematics and computer science.

=== Other Ventures ===
Jones made a brief appearance during the filming of The Real World: Austin (aired in late 2005) in a scene involving charity work. He requested production to limit the airing of his segment; however, agreed to allow the scene to be viewed via The Real World's website.
