= Virginia Reh =

American actress

Virginia Reh grew up in New York City and studied dramatic arts in Berkeley, California. She joined the faculty of Dramatic Arts at Brock University from a professional career as an actor, director, dramaturg and coach, working in theatre, opera and film and television. For 13 years she taught part-time at Brock and officially became full-time in 2006, teaching acting, directing and voice. Her vocal work includes directing all the voices for the last 76 episodes of Sailor Moon that were dubbed into English. She has directed Ring Round the Moon, Marat/Sade, A Little Night Music, Phedre, Orpheus Descending, and The Blue Room for mainstage DART productions. She has worked professionally with Opera In Concert, Toronto Operetta Theatre and Tapestry New Opera. Reh was founding co-director of Script Lab, developing plays, musicals and film scripts. She was artistic director of the Gryphon Theatre. For many years Reh was acting coach and production manager to the Canadian Children's Opera Chorus. In 1994, Reh received the Theatre Ontario's Maggie Bassett award for outstanding contribution to theatre in Ontario. Reh organized a national conference, Lyric Canada 2010, bringing together the creators and scholars of Canadian music theatre and opera. Reh was an Ontario councillor for the Canadian Actors' Equity Association and secretary/treasurer of the executive through 2012. In the course of nine years at Brock she directed seven main stage.

== Early life ==
Reh began acting at a young age with the Emerson Players, a community theatre company based out of the unitarian church which she participated in with her parents in New York. She attended the University of Berkeley as a French major but soon transitioned to Dramatic Arts major after her first audition. In her studies at Berkeley, it was required for her to take directing courses for her masters, which then lead her to the Scholar Director PHD program. She dropped out of the PHD program so that she could pursue acting in a small theatre company in California. The company did not have enough directors, so she volunteered. She started directing seriously in the early 1980s, at a time when a movement of women playwrights and directors was beginning.

== Selected Theatre Work: Acting ==
- Richard III: Queen Margaret/Edward IV. Shakespeare in the Square (Director: Scott Lale) August, 2005
- The Foreigner: Betty Meeks. Theatre on the Grand (Director: Virginia Reh)
- The Last of the Red Hot Lovers: Jeanette. Theatre on the Grand (Director: Joan Howell)
- Chapter Two: Jenny Malone. Gryphon Theatre (Director: Robert Buck)
- Private Lives: Amanda Prynne. Colonnade Theatre (Director: Peter Peroff)
- Lady Windermere's Fan: Lady Windermere. Colonnade Theatre (Director: Peter Peroff)
- The Apple Cart: Princess Royal. Shaw Festival (Director: Noel Williams)
- The Admirable Crichton: Mlle. Jeanne. Shaw Festival (Director: Barry Morse)
- The Importance of Being Earnest: Cecily Cardew. Colonnade Theatre (Director: David Moulday)
- School for Scandal: Lady Teazle. Colonnade Theatre (Director: Peter Peroff)

== Selected Theatre Work: Directing for young audiences ==
- La Sante c'est pas sorcier, Waterloo Productions, Ontario Tours 1986-1988
- Il Drago di Energio (Conserving Kingdom), Waterwood Productions/Ministry of Energy 1987
- I'm Never Growin' Up (Lukasiewicz & Reynolds), Aladdin Theatre at the Limelight, Toronto 1987
- Which Witch is which? (McMaster), Aladdin Theatre at the Limelight, Toronto 1987
- Fox of a Thousand facts (Campbell), Colonnade Theatre, Toronto, September 1974

== Selected Theatre Work: Directing ==
- Noises Off, Theatre Sarnia 2003
- Joseph and the Amazing Technicolor Dreamcoat, Yorkminstrels, 2001, remounted in 2002
- Anything Goes, Yorkminstrels, Leah Posluns Theatre, Toronto 1998
- Pirates of Penzance, Victorian Operetta Society, Cobourg, 1995
- Grand Hotel, Etobicoke Musical Productions, Toronto 1995
- A Midsummer Night's Dream, Markham Theatre, 1993
- The Gipsy Princess, Scugog Choral Society, Port Perry, November 1992
- Albertine in Five Times, The Oakville Players, Oakville, November 1991
- Man of La Mancha, Glen Productions, Cornwall, 1990
- Jesus Christ Superstar, Burlington Light Opera, 1989
- Show Boat, Etobicoke Musical Productions, April 1988
- The Threepenny Opera, McMaster Music Theatre, Hamilton 1984
- The House of Bernarda Alba, Alumnae Theatre, Toronto 1980

=== Selected Film/Television ===
- A Home at the End of the World - Warner Bros./ Michael Mayer, with Colin Farrel and Sissy Spacek
- My Sisters' Keeper - Power Productions/ABC/Bill Norton
- Side Effects - CBC/Brad Turner
- Mafia Princess - NBC Movie of the Week/Bob Collins with Tony Curtis
