= Ludwig Reh =

German entomologist (1867-1940)

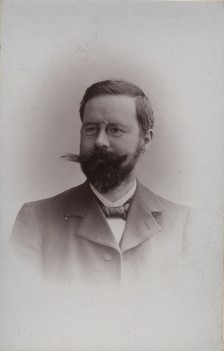

Ludwig Heinrich Reh (April 17, 1867 – November 3, 1940) was a German entomologist who worked on crop pests and was among the first professional entomologists involved in quarantine regulation in Hamburg port.

Reh was born in Dieburg, Hesse and studied at the Realgymnasium Darmstadt before going to the University of Jena where he studied under Stern, Fürbringer, Willy Kükenthal and Ernst Haeckel. He worked with Haeckel for his doctorate at the Natural History Museum in Hamburg in 1892 with a thesis on the limbs of pinnipeds. He then worked at the Zoological Institute and Museum in Strasbourg (1894–95), Museo Paulista-São Paulo, Brazil (1895–96) and at the Concilium bibliographicum, Zurich (1896–1898) after which he became involved in a newly established quarantine unit in Hamburg Port which dealt particularly with preventing entry of the San Jose scale. Reh worked under a botanist and complained that plant protection was not suitably handled by botanists who did not understand pests such as Phylloxera. Reh suggested that the crops themselves would adapt to new pests and focused on host plants. In 1903 he moved back to the museum and contributed to Paul Sorauer's handbook of plant diseases making him a well-known name in applied entomology. From 1923 to 1924 Reh curated and distributed the exsiccata Jaap Zoocecidien-Sammlung. Nachlass-Serien 28-34. Bearbeitet von Prof. Dr. [L.] Reh.
