= Simeon ten Holt =

Dutch composer

- Born: 24 January 1923; Bergen, North Holland, the Netherlands
- Died: 25 November 2012 (aged 89); Alkmaar, the Netherlands
- Era: Contemporary classical music

Simeon ten Holt (24 January 1923 – 25 November 2012) was a Dutch contemporary classical composer.

Ten Holt was born in Bergen, North Holland, and studied with Jakob van Domselaer, eventually developing a highly personal style of minimal composition. Van Domselaer's influence on ten Holt's musical philosophy was considerable, with the younger composer picking up van Domselaer's interests in the links between music and visual art, in music's relationship with mathematics, and in the use of the piano as a principal instrument in his compositions.

Ten Holt generally used consonant, tonal materials and his works are organized in numerous cells, made up of a few measures each, which are repeated ad libitum according to the player's preference. Many of his works are for piano or ensembles of multiple pianos. His most famous work is Canto Ostinato, which he wrote in 1976 and is considered one of the most famous works in contemporary classical Dutch music history.

Ten Holt died 25 November 2012 in Alkmaar, the Netherlands, aged 89.

== Works ==
=== Piano ===
- Kompositie I, II, III, IV (1942–1945)
- Sonate (1953)
- 20 Bagatellen (1954)
- Allegro ex machina (1955)
- Diagonaalsuite (1957)
- Muziek voor Pieter, 7 small pieces (1958)
- Diagonaalsonate (1959)
- Soloduiveldans I (1959)
- Epigrammen (1959)
- 5 Etudes (1961)
- Cyclus aan de Waanzin (1961–1962)
- Sekwensen, for 1 or 2 pianos (1965)
- Interpolations (1969)
- 5 Pieces (1970–1972)
- Canto Ostinato (1976–1979)
- Natalon in E (1980)
- Lemniscaat (1982–1983)
- Horizon (1983–1985)
- Soloduiveldans II (1986)
- Incantatie IV, for piano and other instruments (1987–1990)
- Soloduiveldans III (1990)
- Schaduw noch Prooi, for 2 pianos (1993–1995)
- Eadem sed Aliter (hetzelfde maar anders) (1995)
- Méandres, for 4 pianos (1997)
- Soloduiveldans IV (1998)

=== Chamber music ===
- Suite, for string quartet (1954–1955)
- Diagonaalmuziek, for strings (1958)
- Quartetto: per archi, for string quartet (1965)
- Differenties, for mixed ensemble, (3 clarinets, piano, vibraphone, 2-11 players) (1969)
- Scenario-X, (2 trumpets, horn, trombone, tuba) (1970)
- Palimpsest, for string septet (4 violins, viola, cello and contrabass) (1990–1992, 1993 revised)
- Capriccio, for solo violin (1999)

=== Electronic ===
- Inferno I & II (1970–1971)
- Module IV (1970–1972)
- I am Sylvia but somebody else (1973)

=== Vocal ===
- ..A/ .TA-LON, for mezzo-soprano and 36 instrumentalists who play and speak (1967–1968)
- Koorprojekt 75, for 3 choirs, 4 speakers, electronic music (1975)
- Bi-Ba-Bo for vocal quartet (1980)

=== Other ===
- Tripticon, for percussion (1965)
- Kockyn : een kermiskroniek, film music for piano, guitar and metallophone (1966)
- Centri-fuga for orchestra (1976)
- Une musique blanche for orchestra (1980–1982)
