= Alfredo Martinez (art patron) =

Cuban-American art collector

- Born: November 28, 1948 (age 77); Guanabo, Cuba
- Occupations: Art dealer, gallerist, art promoter, art collector, art patron, Fine-art photographer, author
- Years active: 1985 – present
- Known for: Marpad Art Gallery, Alfredo Martinez Gallery, The Martinez Collection
- Spouse: Gloria Martinez

Alfredo Martinez (born 1948) is a Cuban-American art collector, fine art photographer, curator, dealer, promoter, author, and former gallerist. He became a prominent figure in the Latin American fine art market internationally and particularly in South Florida after he began organizing art exhibitions in the mid-1980s. Martinez's professional and philanthropic art events and patronage activities were distinctive for referencing contemporary social issues, such as AIDS and underrepresented cultures in the arts. Martinez owned and operated two major art galleries and other art-related businesses based in Coral Gables, Florida. He has organized art exhibitions, lectures, and auctions throughout the United States and Latin America, including South Florida, New Hampshire, Argentina, Panama, and Costa Rica.

== Early life ==
Martinez was born in Playa de Guanabo, Cuba, on November 28, 1948. He was raised in the greater Havana area, where he was exposed and drawn to Cuba's flourishing art community. Martinez came of age during the period of turmoil that included the Cuban Revolution and its effects. In his early life he served as a lifeguard in Guanabo, Boca Ciega, Santa Maria, and Mariano Beach, through which he would meet his future wife, Gloria Maria Yi Ma. The couple married in 1975 and four years later left for Spain.

== Move to America and early art career ==
After residing in Spain for a year, Martinez and his wife relocated to the United States in 1980, where they joined the Cuban exile community in Miami. Among that community were members of Martinez's immediate family, including his father who was a successful businessman catering to the South Florida restaurant industry. Martinez joined his father's business when they reconnected, and he remained there until he chose to pursue his longstanding passion for the arts beginning in the mid-1980s.

Martinez began his professional involvement in fine art by investing in and promoting segments of the Latin American art community that he felt the South Florida art establishment had neglected. As such, he initially focused on Caribbean artists outside of Cuba. His first major art event was a 1985 solo exhibition for the Haitian surrealist Jean Baptiste Rosvelt that Martinez sponsored and curated in the Metro Dade County Cultural Center. Throughout the rest of the 1980s Martinez would also support Dominican artists and Central American artists and also began actively collecting local Cuban art from the Cuban community in South Florida.

== Marpad Gallery ==
After six years of curating, art promoting, and building his own extensive personal art collection, Martinez co-founded his first fine art gallery in 1991 with fellow art dealer Domingo Padron. The gallery's name, Marpad, comes from the combination of their last names, Martinez and Padron. Marpad Art Gallery was based in Coral Gables, Florida, a cultural center for the high-profile fine art market in the greater South Florida region. Significant resources were invested into the gallery to establish it as a prominent art venue within Coral Gables. As such, it developed an extensive apparatus offering a range of services beyond the sale of Latin American fine art such as framing, restoration, literature publication, artist representation and also employed its own Latin American art specialists, including Roberto J. Cayuso. The gallery also owned multiple properties beyond its main storefront. Martinez served as co-director of Marpad and organized many of its events and operations. His wife, Gloria M. Martinez, would also serve as a director.

As Marpad became a popular South Florida art locale, it produced an eclectic roster of events and exhibitions ranging from popular and traditional Cuban art as well as Martinez's inclination toward the obscure, undervalued, and underrepresented such as Caribbean and Central American art. During its five-year span, Marpad held several noteworthy solo and collective exhibitions. In its first year the gallery secured a solo exhibition of leading Cuban painter and founding member of the GALA Group (Grupo de Artistas Latino-Americanos) Osvaldo Gutierrez. By the end of its inaugural year, the gallery posted revenue in excess of $100,000 (approximately $200,000 in 2021, adjusted for inflation.) In its second year the gallery held an ambitious collective exhibition marking the 500th anniversary of the Discovery of America and its impacts. The exhibition, held in April 1992, featured 37 Latin American artists from Cuba, Costa Rica, Haiti, El Salvador, the Dominican Republic, Venezuela, Colombia, Argentina, Panama, as well as from Spain. That same year the gallery hosted a collective exhibition of Jamaican artists. Titled Two Generations, the exhibition featured 21 Jamaican artists that ranged in age from 24 to 70, focusing on the cross-generational theme of avant garde artworks that broke from Jamaican art traditions.

Marpad Gallery also held regular solo exhibitions for several leading Cuban artists including Josignacio (1991, 1993, 1995), José Mijares (1992, 1995), and Servando Cabrera Moreno (1995). During its tenure the gallery's events received extensive media coverage from The Miami Herald and El Nuevo Herald as well as in books such as Modern Jamaican Art (1998) and the Encyclopedia of Latin American and Caribbean Art (2000). By 1993 both Martinez and Padron had their own independent galleries that were becoming successful in their own right leading Marpad to eventually close three years later in 1996.

== Alfredo Martinez Gallery ==
Following a string of high-profile collective and individual exhibitions during Marpad Gallery's first two years, Martinez launched his own eponymous fine art gallery, Alfredo Martinez Gallery, in 1993. Martinez served as the gallery's president and chief director and personally curated and organized its events and exhibitions during its seven-year run. Assisting him were his wife Gloria Martinez as administrator and general coordinator of logistics, his nephew Arian Gonzalez as his personal assistant, as well as his daughters attorney Maibe M. Casalins and Dr. Darlanne Martinez, the latter of whom translated the gallery's extensive catalog of published works. Based in Coral Gables, the gallery also recruited noted Cuban literary figures including Nancy Perez Crespo, Jorge Valls, Carlos M. Luis, Giulio V. Blanc, Roberto Cayuso, Luis Lastra, Francisco Fernandez Rubio, Aldo Menendez, and Armando Alvarez-Bravo as writers and presenters for opening receptions, tours of new exhibitions, and catalogue content. Among the gallery's Contemporary Art curators was Peruvian critic Jose Antonio Rivas.

As the main force behind the gallery, its exhibitions reflected Martinez's continuing passion for social and cultural themes that he felt did not receive adequate attention from the art establishment. As with Marpad, these were balanced with high-demand names that were already known by the public. The gallery received early attention when it hosted a retrospective on famed Cuban Vanguardia artist Victor Manuel titled Victor Manuel: Transcendencia de la Libertad in 1993 as well as the controversial 1994 exhibition AIDS: Arte vs Silencio (AIDS: Art vs Silence). The latter featured artwork by Cuban artist Reynold Campbell and was among the first exhibitions in South Florida to be fully dedicated to the still-taboo subject of AIDS, resulting in the El Nuevo Herald feature article La Violencia de Reynold Campbell (The Violence of Reynold Campbell). Other notable solo exhibitions held in the gallery included showings of Josignacio (1996, 1998) and Jose Mijares (1996). Mijares, then 75, stated that his retrospective there, titled Mijares En Grande (Mijares at Large), was the definitive solo exhibition of his career.

Significant collective exhibitions held at Martinez's gallery included the 1998 showing titled Maestros de la Pintura Cubana del Siglo XX (Masters of Cuban Painting of the 20th Century) which featured the largest figures in the history of Cuban art until that time including Wifredo Lam, Victor Manuel, Amelia Peláez, Carlos Enriquez, Mariano Rodriguez and others. The following year the gallery organized a collective exhibition that focused on spotlighting emerging talent heading into the new millennium titled Future Visions (1999). Also that year the gallery hosted a solo exhibition for Spanish artist Emilio Roca entitled Emilio Roca: Maestro del Cubismo (Emilio Roca: Master of Cubism) with an elaborate opening covered by El Nuevo Herald that included authentic wine and cuisine from Spain and included South Florida community leaders such as Eduardo Padron in attendance. The gallery held a high-profile retrospective of Cuban Vanguardia artist Mario Carreño in February 2000 which was noteworthy for being the first exhibition of Carreño's work globally since his death two months earlier.

Throughout its seven-year span, the gallery and its events were widely covered by art media including The Miami Herald, El Nuevo Herald Latin American Art magazine, Flash Art, Arte Al Día Internacional: International Magazine of Latin American Art and Antiques and Miami mensual as well as in books such as St. James Guide to Hispanic Artists, The Encyclopedia of Caribbean Religions (2013), and Leonard's Price Index of Latin American Art at Auction. After ten years, Martinez retired as a gallerist in 2001.

== Post-gallery activities and patronage ==
Following his retirement as a gallerist in 2001, Martinez re-focused on becoming an art patron, collector, and private art dealer specializing in Latin American art and would work primarily with Christie's auction house, with whom Martinez had an established relationship. He launched a new business, Interactive Fine Art, in 2003 to serve as a more flexible vehicle for his art dealing practice that utilized online operations.

Beyond the events hosted through his affiliated galleries, Marpad and Alfredo Martinez Gallery, Martinez has also sponsored and curated art lectures, auctions, and exhibitions. He has held fine art events at notable South Florida historic landmarks, such as the Biltmore Hotel (1995, 1998) and the Vizcaya Estate (2001). Martinez also participated in prominent recurring South Florida art events such as Art Miami/Miami Art Week in the Miami Beach Convention Center (1993, 1994, 1995) as well as Cuba Nostalgia in the Coconut Grove Convention Center (2001) and worked with several organizations including the U.S. Foreign Trade Institute (2000), the Community Research Initiative of South Florida in support of AIDS research (1994), and the Cuban American National Society of Washington D.C. (1998).

Martinez has also organized art events outside of South Florida, such as the lecture and exhibition Two Views of Cuba: From the Countryside to the City (2000) in the Sharon Arts Center of New Hampshire, featuring Esteban Alvarez-Buylla and Mario Garcia Portela, as well as the 1995 exhibition Pseudo Museum in New York City (co-sponsored by Jupiter Interactive Productions) which was noteworthy at the time for its inclusion of pioneering online elements. Martinez also developed numerous international partnerships with whom he would collaborate and co-sponsor art events with, including Diana Traficante Gallery of Buenos Aires, Argentina, Arteconsul in Panama City, Panama, and Éditions Deleature of Angers, France.

In 2021, Martinez launched a documentary series, Cronicas de la Curaduria de un Trabajo Galeristico (Chronicles of the Curatorship of a Gallery Career), produced by R116 Production and documenting his art exhibitions and events. Following his retirement as a gallerist, Martinez became an artist in the medium of fine art photography and digital photography. In 2022, Martinez' art became the subject of the book El Resultado de mi Mirada, Tomo I featuring 92 works of his photography taken from 2007 to 2022. Martinez then expanded his Cronicas de la Curaduria project into a book series that he authored and published through Interactive Fine Arts. In 2023 he published books on the art of Jean Baptiste Rosvelt, Josignacio, and Esteban Chartrand titled Jean Baptiste Rosvelt: Alma y Corazón de Haití (Jean Baptiste Rosvelt: Heart and Soul of Haiti), Josignacio: Genio del Oleo y la Resina. Tomo I (Josignacio: Genius of Oil and Resin. Volume 1), and Esteban Chartrand: El Artista y su Estética respectively. In 2025 Martinez released the book Robíe: Ilusión, Fantasía o Realidad.

== The Martinez Collection ==
The Alfredo and Gloria Martinez Fine Art Collection includes works by numerous Latin American and European artists that the Martinez's have worked with through their careers as gallerists, curators, art promoters, dealers, and lecturers. It features works by Wifredo Lam, Victor Manuel, Fidelio Ponce, Mario Carreño, Carlos Enriquez, Mariano Rodriguez, Cundo Bermudez, Roberto Estopiñán, Servando Cabrera Moreno, José Mijares, Josignacio, Miguel Fleitas, Tomas Oliva, Carlos Sobrino, Hector Molné, Esteban Alvarez-Buylla, Marvin Chinchilla, Reynold Campbell, Jean Baptiste Rosvelt, Ulrich Gehret, Juan Navarrete, Clara Morerra, Arcadio Cancio and others. The collection also includes the personal journal of Cuban artist Esteban Chartrand (1840–1883) a historical document that includes drawings, sketches, letterings, and personal notes from the artist spanning the period of 1859 to 1882, one year before his death.

The Martinez Collection has lent works to several public art exhibitions hosted by Miami Dade College including Under a Brilliant Sun, Cundo Bermudez: into the 21st Century (2009, at the Freedom Tower Miami), 31 Escultores Cubanos (31 Cuban Sculptors, November 2009), the March 2009 MDC retrospective of Carlos Sobrino (1909–1975) marking 100 years since his birth, as well as MDC's March 2011 retrospective Roberto Estopiñán: Homage to a Great Master on His 90th Anniversary. Other high-profile exhibitions that featured loans from the Martinez Collection included Mario Carreño: A Retrospective (January 1995) by Sotheby's in Coral Gables (sponsored by Bankers Trust) and Fidelio Ponce and his times/ Y su época (October–November 1992) in the Cuban Museum of Arts and Culture.

Artwork from the Martinez Collection has also been included in media on Latin American art including Art Nexus Magazine, ARTnews Art in America, and LEA Art America Magazine where Martinez also penned an essay on Marvin Chinchilla. Works from the Martinez Collection are also featured on several books including El Oficio de la Mirada (1998) and the artist monographs José Mijares: Paintings-Pinturas (1997), Carlos Enriquez: the Painter of Cuban Ballads (2010) and Mariano: Pintura y Dibuja 1935-1949 (Catálogo Razonado, Anexo al Volumen I).

== Legacy ==
Between 1985 and 2000 Martinez had sponsored and curated more than 20 solo exhibitions and 50 collective exhibitions. His curation style, supported by his galleries, were known for supporting emerging and underrepresented artists, and often deviating from the prevailing popularity of Cuban art in South Florida by including artists from Jamaica, Haiti, the Dominican Republic, and throughout Latin America. Martinez also organized auctions and fundraisers in support of causes such as AIDS research (1994), Americans Helping Americans, C.E.A.S.E., and the Hispanic Center for Health and Policy Development (1999).

Throughout his career Martinez also drew recognition for his exhibitions and association with many of the leading Cuban and Latin American artists of the 20th century. Among them, Martinez has curated solo art exhibitions for: Victor Manuel, Mario Carreño, Carlos Enriquez, Servando Cabrera Moreno, José Mijares, Josignacio, Osvaldo Gutierrez, Clara Morera, Nelson Franco, Arcadio Cancio, Esteban Alvarez Buylla, Guillermo Spinosa, Mary Low Machado, Lesver de Quirós, Juan Navarrete, Hector Molné, Marvin Chinchilla, Reynold Campbell, Ulrich Gehret, and others. Martinez also curated collective exhibitions that featured artwork by the following artists: Wifredo Lam, Amelia Peláez, Fidelio Ponce, Victor Manuel, René Portocarrero, Cundo Bermudez, Mario Carreño, Eduardo Abela, Esteban Chartrand, Leopoldo Romañach, Agustín Fernández, Rafael Soriano, Osvaldo Gutiérrez, Domingo Ravenet, Domingo Ramos, Ana Maria Sarlat, Lia Galletti, and others. By organizing many art exhibitions, auctions, lectures and other events promoting and supporting the arts, Martinez was influential in introducing several international artists to the art market of the United States, including Haitian artist Jean Baptiste Rosvelt, Costa Rican artist Marvin Chinchilla, Cuban artists Héctor Molné, Reynold Campbell, Esteban Alvarez-Buylla, Clara Morera, as well as European artists Emilio Roca of Spain and German artist Ulrich Gehret.

Martinez has lent and contributed works from the Martinez Collection to several public art exhibitions organized by Miami-Dade College, Sotheby's, and others that have included their works by Fidelio Ponce, Cundo Bermudez, Roberto Estopiñán, Mario Carreño, and Carlos Sobrino, among others. Martinez has also sponsored, published, and contributed to several art publications and catalogs to further the scholarly recognition and study of Latin American art and artists. His published catalogs include: The World of Jose Mijares / El Mundo de Jose Mijares (1992, Marpad Gallery), Mijares en Grande/Mijares at Large (1996, Alfredo Martinez Gallery), Marvin Chinchilla: Vertebrates Spirits (1994, Alfredo Martínez Gallery), Reynold Campbell: Busqueda y Pasion (1999, Alfredo Martinez Gallery), Victor Manuel: Transcendencia de la Libertad (1993, Alfredo Martinez Gallery), Homage to Carlos Enriquez (1997, Alfredo Martinez Gallery), Mario Carreño (2000, Alfredo Martinez Gallery), Emilio Roca: Maestro del Cubismo (1999, Alfredo Martinez Gallery), Arcadio Cancio: Viaje Al Mundo De Ayer (1997, Alfredo Martinez Gallery), Clara Morerra: The Messenger (1993, Alfredo Martinez Gallery), Esteban Alvarez-Buylla: Vivencias Cubanas (1999, Alfredo Martinez Gallery), Armando Alvarez Bravo: Autorretratos a trancos (1996, Alfredo Martinez Gallery; illustrated by Marvin Chinchilla), and others.

Martinez has been included in Marquis Who's Who in America (1996), Art Index Retrospective (1996), Art Index (1997), and the Directorio de Arte Latinoamericano (2000).

== See also ==
- Cuban art
- Latin American art
