= Josignacio =

Cuban artist

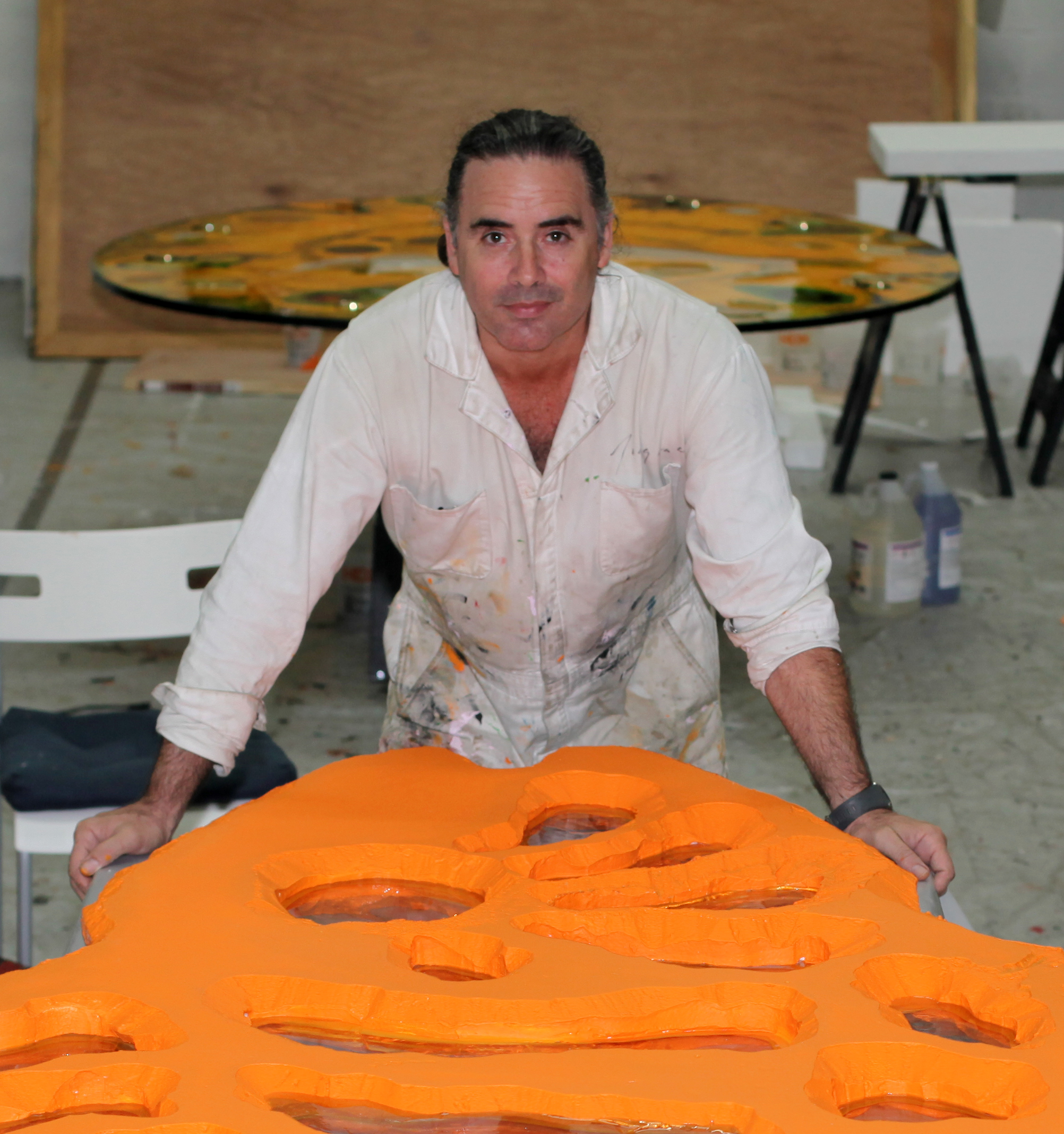
- Josignacio in his Miami Beach art studio.
- Born: Josė Ignacio Sánchez-Rius; 24 October 1963 (age 62); Havana, Cuba
- Known for: Plastic Paint Medium, Neo Figurative Art, Abstract art
- Notable work: The Music is Timeless; The Three Wisest Monkeys; The 3 O'Clock; The Pact; Red Fish; The Virtual Key; Rhapsody Blue
- Movement: Contemporary art, "Cuban Generation of the 80s"
- Awards: Hortt 38 Best In Show '96, 1st Place in EVMCC '79 and '80

Josignacio (b. José Ignacio Sánchez-Rius, in Havana, Cuba, on October 24, 1963) is a Cuban-born American Contemporary artist and author. He is among the most significant living contemporary Cuban and Latin American artists due to his career auction records, paint medium innovations, and association with notable cultural events, venues, and celebrity figures in the United States and Latin America.

He emerged in Cuba's controversial, "La Generacion de los 80s," the 80s generation of contemporary Cuban art, also referred to as New Cuban Art. This cultural decade in Cuba contrasted a country in transition, influenced artistic debates both at home and abroad, and began the generation's collaboration with “Volume 1" - a commitment to non-government mandated artistic expression. They included Rubén Torres Llorca, José Bedia Valdés, Ricardo Rodriguez Brey, Juan Francisco Elso, Rogelio López Marín (Gory), Gustavo Pérez Monzón, José Manuel Fors, Leandro Soto Ortiz, Israel León, Tomás Sánchez and Carlos Alfonzo.

In the second half of the decade, other artistic groups were formed, including 4 x 4, Grupo Hexágono, Arte Calle, Grupo Provisional, the duet René Francisco Rodríguez and Eduardo Ponjuán González and ABTV. Grupo Puré, another new wave of young artists, graduates of the Instituto Superior de Arte (ISA), included Ana Albertina Delgado Álvarez, Adriano Buergo, Ciro Quintana. Josignacio first gained artistic recognition in Cuba as a key figure of this period and was widely exhibited in Havana galleries during the 1980s.

In 1984, Josignacio created the "Plastic Paint Medium" of art by mixing epoxy resins with oil colors and other pigments, resulting in a hard, glossed, 3D finish, a method which would become his identifiable style. Josignacio is the first living contemporary Latin American artist to have an artwork surpass US$3 million at auction.

His work has been exhibited in the United States, Latin America, and Europe. and featured in the collections of several notable cultural institutions including the Museo Jumex, the Tampa Museum of Art, the Wilzig Museum, and Cuba's National Library.

== Early life ==
=== Upbringing ===
Josė Ignacio Sánchez Rius was born on 24 October 1963 in Havana, Cuba. He was raised in Havana during the post-Revolution period. During his upbringing, Josignacio was acquainted with several prominent Cuban national figures in the creative arts. These included the artists René Portocarrero, Amelia Peláez, Felipe López, Mariano Rodriguez, Roberto Fabelo, and Gilberto Marino, many of whom had established international profiles and several of which, most notably Portocarrero, would also mentor him with painting lessons. He also knew famed Cuban ballerina and choreographer Alicia Alonso due to his cousins being professional dancers. This exposure was highly formative to his creative development and influenced his own art career.

=== Early art career ===
He began to exhibit his work in 1979 at the age of sixteen. In 1983, Josignacio passed the admissions test for the Instituto Superior de Arte (ISA) at the age of twenty. Before attending, however, he has shaved his head as a change in his personal style and appearance to reflect entering a new stage in his life. This act was misinterpreted by the ISA administration as a protest against the Castro government, and he was subsequently banned from attending the institute. Following this incident, the artist was largely self-taught and supplementally educated through continued mentorships, as in his childhood.

Despite the reprimand, Josignacio chose to continue to pursue an art career. The following year, in 1984, he worked as a studio assistant for Martinez Anay and Andres Ugalde during their creation of a large scale public mural for the Sociedad de Educación Patriótico-Militar (SEPMI; the Military Patriotic Educational Society), the Cuban equivalent of the Boy Scouts. The agency was then directed by former Cuban Cosmonaut Arnaldo Tamayo Méndez. His involvement in this public art project proved to be a significant turning-point for his career as it was during that period that the artist first discovered a method of mixing epoxy resin with oil paint. This new medium took him two years to develop and refine through experimentation and would come to be known as the “Plastic Paint Medium.” Josignacio held first career solo exhibition, secured by his uncle Gerardo, at the Artistic and Literary Lyceum of the city of Regla on March 2, 1987. The exhibition was also notable for being the first global exhibition entirely composed of publicly displayed works in the Plastic Paint Medium. During this period of developing the Plastic Paint Medium, Josignacio was a frequent patron of the renowned Havana restaurant La Bodeguita del Medio and part of the community of artists that would gather there. By 1988, Josignacio was a member of the Asociación Hermanos Saíz (AHS), a Cuban youth arts institution, and his career began to become increasingly impacted by international Cuban politics. As an AHS member, he was commissioned that year to create the design for one of the participating floats in the Havana Carnival. Upon completion of his design and presenting it to the event commission, he was informed that his commission was canceled and the float design was recommissioned to fellow Cuban painter Manuel Mendive. This was precipitated by a controversial incident in which one of Mendive's paintings, El Pavo Real, was burned by an anti-Castro activist following his purchase of the piece at an April 22 auction held in the former Cuban Museum of Art and Culture in Miami. In reaction to this incident, the Castro government reassigned Josignacio's commission to Mendive in a show of solidarity.

Nevertheless, by 1989 Josignacio had become professionally established with his work exhibited in eighteen Havana galleries between 1987 and 1989. A final career turning point occurred later that year as he was invited exhibit his art internationally in two venues in Mexico City: The Gallery of the National Auditorium and Centro Cultural Los Talleres in Coyoacán. The planned shows were ultimately cancelled on May 10, 1989, by the Castro government by way of the Cuban embassy in Mexico City. This latest incident prompted the artist relocate permanently to the United States on September 14, 1989, where he would become a naturalized American citizen.

== Career in the United States ==
Upon relocating to the United States in 1989, Josignacio joined the South Florida Cuban diaspora in exile. There he quickly emerged as a major figure in Miami and Cuban exile culture and society. After becoming connected to Cuban fine art dealer Alfredo Martinez, Josignacio was introduced to his network and Martinez became a patron and supporter of his work. Martinez owned two prominent art galleries in Coral Gables: Marpad Gallery and Alfredo Martinez Gallery. Josignacio became a featured artist of both and would quickly establish himself in the American art market through the 1990s.

In 1991 Josignacio had a solo exhibition in Marpad Gallery and was then a featured artist in the annual Art Miami contemporary art fair, in which he would maintain a regular presence through 2007. The following year was a featured artist in Marpad Gallery's major collective exhibition marking the 500th anniversary of the Discovery of America, held in April 1992. The exhibition featured 37 Latin American artists from Cuba, Costa Rica, Haiti, El Salvador, the Dominican Republic, Venezuela, Colombia, Argentina, Panama, as well as from Spain.

Josignacio experienced a pronounced career breakthrough in the United States by the mid-1990s. In 1996 he had a solo exhibition in Alfredo Martinez Gallery and participated in two prominent South Florida annual collective art exhibitions: Art Palm Beach and the Museum of Art Fort Lauderdale's 38th Annual Hortt Competition Exhibition, Florida's oldest juried art exhibition. In the latter Josignacio won the Best in Show award for which he was one of 80 featured artists exhibiting a total of 105 works chosen from a pool of over 1,300 submissions. His winning piece was the work The 3 O'Clock. In 1997 he exhibited in the Liquid night club, a high-profile Miami nightclub of the 1990s, in an exhibition organized by close Madonna associates Ingrid Casares and Chris Paciello. Casares and Paciello would also organize and host three additional exhibitions for Josignacio that year at Risk, another of their night clubs.

In 2001 and 2002 he participated in the Cuba Nostalgia art fair and collective exhibition through Alfredo Martinez Gallery. The exhibitions featured other leading Cuban artists such as the Cuban Vangaurdia artists, Jose Maria Mijares, and Carlos Alfonzo.

From 2006 to 2010, Josignacio was the subject of three film documentaries. In 2013 he published his first novel, Las Lagrimas del Cocodrilo.

The mid-2010s was another pivotal period in Josignacio's career. In 2015 he returned to Cuba for the first time in 25 years since emigrating to the United States. That same year he set the global auction record for the highest price achieved by a living Cuban artist with the sale of The Three Wisest Monkeys for US$720,000 in Las Vegas, Nevada.

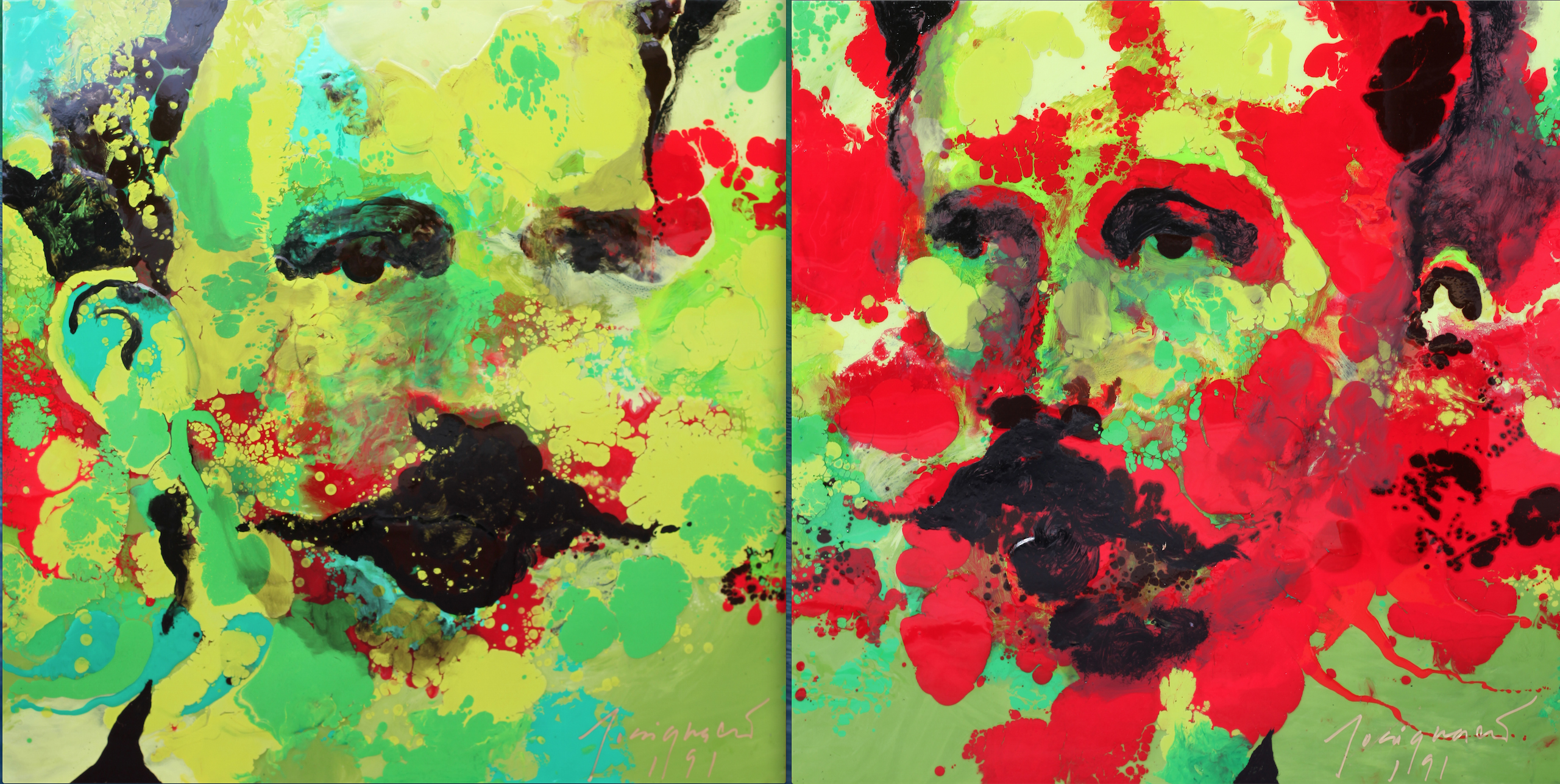
Painting diptych of José Martí, November 18, 2017. The artwork is on permanent display at The National Library José Martí.

In March 2016 Josignacio set the global auction record for the highest price achieved by a living Latin American artist with the sale of The Music is Timeless (1989) for US$3,481,205.00 in London. This was also the first work by a living Latin American artist to surpass US$3 million at auction. Josignacio's Rostro (1989), sold for US$2,329,200.00 in London. This marked his second instance of reaching the multimillion-dollar threshold at auction and cemented the market value of his artwork in the 21st century. That year Josignacio returned once again to Cuba to display works from his Dancers series, at the request of his childhood friend, Cuban ballerina and choreographer Alicia Alonso. This was first time the series had been exhibited in Cuba. Among the works was a figurative painting of Alonso, which was exhibited at the International Ballet Festival in The National Ballet of Cuba in Havana.

In 2017 the artist developed three major new series of work: one of the Chinese Zodiac, one of Cuban national hero José Martí, and one of LGBT+ themed works in opposition to homophobia and transphobia. Each was unveiled and displayed in exhibitions centered on their respective themes.

In 2021 he was a featured artist participating in Art Basel Miami; this was the international art fair's first showing since the outbreak of the global coronavirus pandemic.

In 2024, Josignacio marked the 40th anniversary of his development of the Plastic Paint Medium by breaking a three-year exhibiting hiatus and participating in the high-profile Flora & Fauna exhibition, held in the former Gulf Coast Museum of Art in Largo. The exhibition was his first show in Tampa Bay and his first exhibition since 2021. Funded in part by the National Endowment for the Arts, Flora & Fauna also featured other notable artists including Adriano Nicot and Edel Alvarez Galban, and received coverage from Diario Las Americas, The Artisan Magazine, as well as television coverage. Three of Josignacio's well established nature themed series were on view: his Butterfly, Flowers, and Fish.

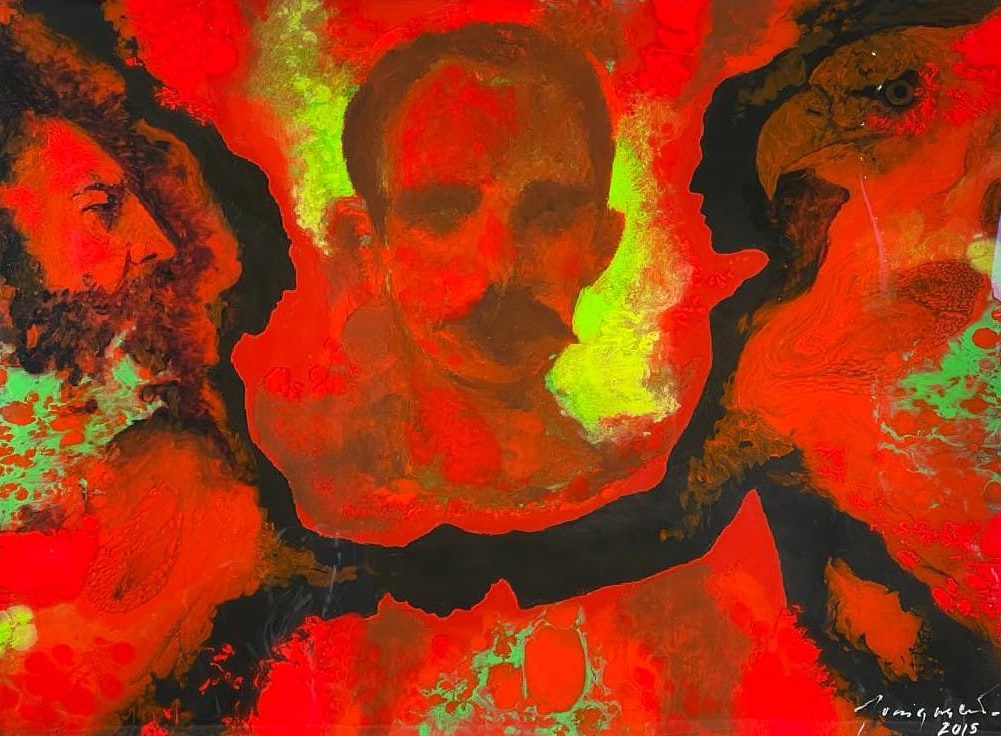
The Pact, 2015 by Josignacio, capturing the Cuban Thaw. Part of the permanent public collection of the Tampa Museum of Art.

In December 2024, Josignacio participated in the Art Basel-affiliated exhibition Forbidden Fruit in Miami Beach during Miami Art Week 2024. The exhibition was notable for being the largest exhibition of Cuban erotic art ever held and drawing more than one thousand attendees to its opening. His featured work in the exhibit, Honey, your dinner is served (1996), was then donated to the World Erotic Art Museum (WEAM), marking his first career entry into a museum permanent collection and capping the 40th anniversary of his first Plastic Paint Medium work. Honey, your dinner is served was worth a reported $256,000 and was considered the flagship donation of the collection of donated works that marked the largest donation the museum had received outside the Wilzig family.

Following the WEAM donation, in January 2025 it was announced that Josignacio was added into the permanent collection of the Tampa Museum of Art with the acquisition of his piece The Pact. Executed ten years prior in 2015, The Pact was donated by art patron Antonio Permuy and was considered a notable work in Josignacio's career for marking the historic "Cuban Thaw" in diplomatic relations between the United States and Cuba. The acquisition was also noteworthy due to the long established Cuban roots in Tampa, and the many visits of Cuban national figure José Martí, who is prominently featured in the center of the piece, to the city. The Tampa Museum of Art released a statement marking the acquisition saying "The Pact is a significant work that commemorates the thawing of relations between the United States and Cuba, in addition to highlighting José Martí's historical connection with our community."

In late 2025, Josignacio's Vase of Flowers of his series Flores meae numquam marcescun —My flowers never wilt, was added into the NSU Alvin Sherman Library's Marta Permuy Legacy Collection. The Alvin Sherman Library is noted for being one of the largest library's in the state of Florida and holding a permanent collection of art with works by Salvador Dalí, Dale Chihuly, Peter Max, and Baruj Salinas. Vase of Flowers was completed during the COVID-19 global pandemic of 2020 as a sign of hope during the period of lockdowns and widespread uncertainty. The piece was unveiled in the Library's Cotilla Gallery during its annual Hispanic Heritage exhibition, during which it was displayed alongside an original work by Salvador Dalí from the Library's permanent collection.

In March 2026, Josignacio was added to the permanent collection of the Jumex Museum in Mexico City with the acquisition of a work from his Guitar series to mark the 10th anniversary of his 2016 auction record for the highest price reached for a painting by a living Latin American artist with the sale of another work from the series, The Music is Timeless.

== Style and analysis ==
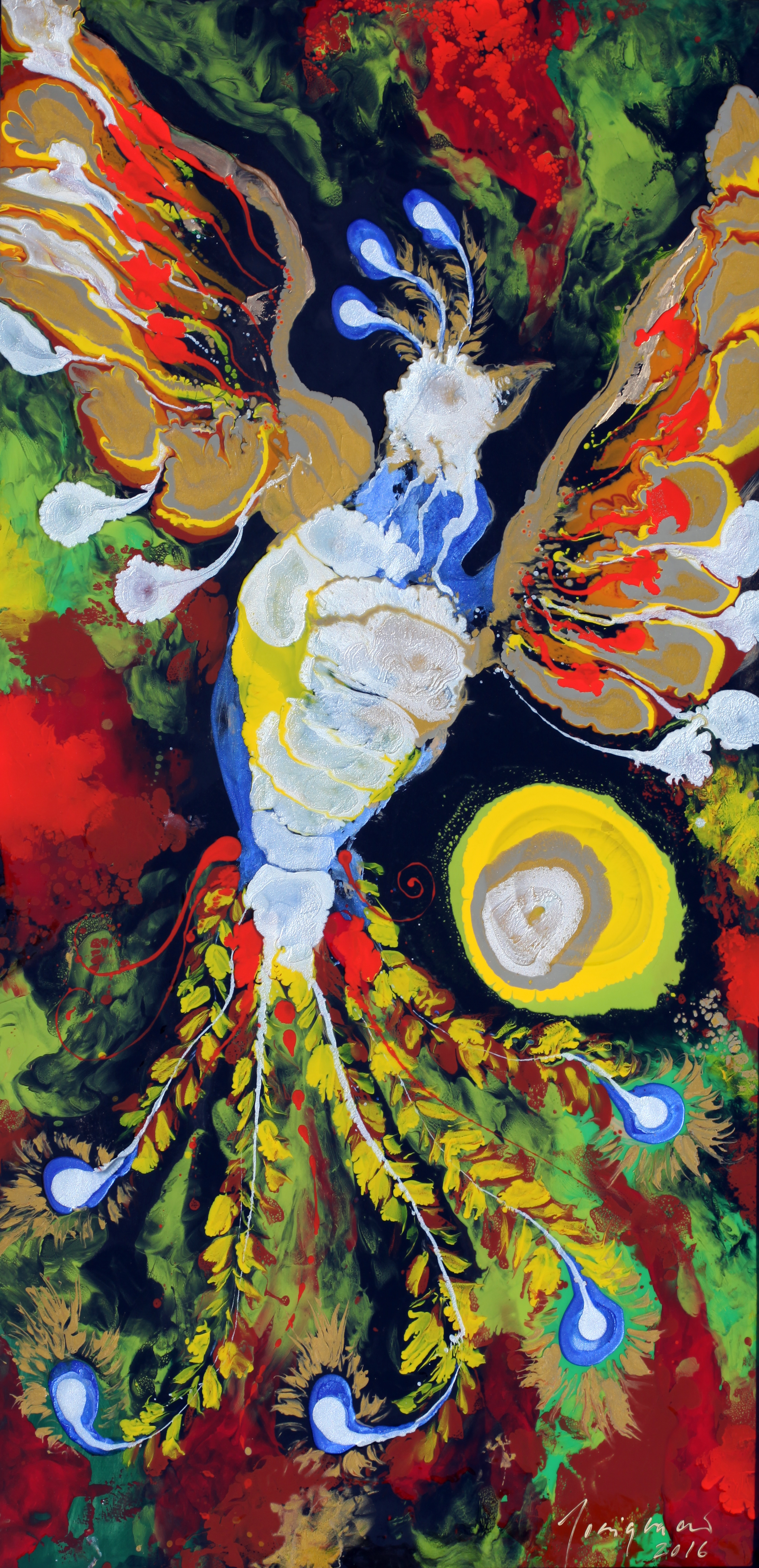
"Fénix" (Phoenix) by Josignacio, 2016. Part of the permanent collection of the House of Arts and Chinese Traditions in Havana, Cuba

Josignacio's artwork is described as varyingly abstract, semi-abstract, and neofigurative. His works emphasize color over form and he typically works in large scale formats.

He best known for working in and pioneering the "Plastic Paint Medium," which he first developed in 1984. The medium uses clear epoxy resin mixed with color pigment which is then drip-poured unto surfaces to create forms. The resulting effect achieves a brilliance in color and shine Cuban art critic Yoel Almaguer de Armas compares to painted glass.

The term Plastic Paint Medium was first coined by Dr. Jose Antonio Portuondo who wrote in the catalog for Josignacio's first solo exhibition in 1987. In it, he described the use of epoxy resin as an “agglutinating medium” and called Josignacio the artistic representative of the “Plastic Era.” Its impact and avant-garde nature has been called “A revolution inside The Revolution” by Colombian writer Gabriel García Márquez while art critic Leonel López-Nussa described it as “New-Ism.” Dr. Kenworth W. Moffett, former Museum of Art Fort Lauderdale Director, described the Plastic Paint Medium as "the result of the marriage of art and technology." Among the medium's practical advantages are that it is more durable against the elements as well as better resistant to the effect of UV light than standard oil and acrylic works.

Despite the "Plastic Era" associations of Josignacio's Plastic Paint Medium, there have also been psychological, philosophical, and anti-commercial statements found within his work. Like the Abstract Expressionists, his method engages in what he describes as a “dialog” with his works while creating them, allowing himself to be guided to a conclusion rather than tightly controlling the outcome. This approach prioritizes the unconscious over the conscious in the creating process. As such, he has stated that he is more interested in the organic abstract elements that emerge in his creative process than in the result, which allows for a continual discovery of new aspects to the works after completion. He has also incorporated abstracted ambiguous images in his art to contrast the superficial elements and encourage deeper psychological reflection from the viewer.

Among his most well-known and reported series of works are his auction record-breaking Guitar series, his various animal series, as well as more figurative representations of the human form. One of his longest-running series is his Flores meae numquam marcescun —My flowers never wilt, a series of florals which began during his teenage years in the 1970s and predates his development of the Plastic Paint Medium, but has continued with the medium's adoption into the 21st century.

His most recent works since the end of the 2010s further experiment with contemporary mediums, such as multimedia, sculptural, and three dimensional works that incorporate LED light.

=== Influences ===
Early Cuban abstract art, European art, and mid-century American art are significant influences in Josignacio's art. After 1960 and during Josignacio's upbringing, Cuban abstract art was scarce or considerably silenced on the island as a result of the Cuban Revolution. This contributed to the radical, avant-garde nature of the art emerging in Cuba during the 1980s. The 80s Generation group would coalesce around Galería Color-Luz, which was started just after Ms. Soldevilla returned from several years in Paris as Cuba's cultural attaché, bringing European influence. Her partner in the effort, Pedro de Oraá, an artist, poet and art critic, born in 1931, also wrote a short history of the group.

Josignacio was influenced by the Abstract Expressionists of the New York School (art), especially Jackson Pollock, from whom he originally saw the use of dripping and pouring paint onto canvases. However, instead of alkyd enamels that Pollack used, Josignacio used his "Plastic Paint Medium" technique of mixing epoxy resins with oil colors and other pigments. Dutch painter Karel Appel's faces and Russian artist Wassily Kandinsky's mix of colors were also special focuses. From Dutch-American Willem de Kooning. Josignacio learned the centered figure compositions Another influence of Abstract Expressionism is his use and strong incorporation of fluid, largescale color field backgrounds in his works. Josignacio was also influenced by his early exposure and mentorships from Cuban Vanguardia artists, such as René Portocarrero, and their use of color.

In addition to the formal elements of fine art movements and artists, the Josignacio has also cited other influences to his work outside visual art. These have included music (particularly in his Guitar series), human emotion, and the details within the natural world. In regards to nature, Josignacio has acknowledged using close-up images of fossil rocks, deep-sea flora and fauna, and outer space as references and inspiration for his work.

== Recognition and legacy ==
Josignacio is best known for developing the Plastic Paint Medium, as well as for breaking auction records for living Cuban and Latin American artists. As his profile has expanded since beginning his career in the 1970s, Josignacio's artwork has been exhibited in major art markets in Europe, Cuba, and the United States including Havana, London, New York City, New Jersey, Miami, Coral Gables, Miami Beach, and Fort Lauderdale. This has included participation in international art fairs, exhibitions, and prominent venues including Art Palm Beach, Art Miami, Art Basel Miami, the Miami Design District, and the Museum of Art Fort Lauderdale's Annual Hortt Competition Exhibition. His art is in the permanent collection of the Tampa Museum of Art, Museo Jumex in Mexico City, the World Erotic Art Museum, and Cuba's National Library, the Biblioteca Nacional de Cuba José Martí. His artwork is also included within the private collections of the several most prominent figures of the 20th and 21st centuries across a range of fields. His collectors have included Madonna, Jay-Z and Beyoncé, Emilio and Gloria Estefan, Andy Garcia, former U.S. President Bill Clinton, former Speaker of the House of Representatives Newt Gingrich, four past presidents of Mexico, and leading Latin American art collections including Jorge Mas Canosa, the Bacardi and Fanjul families, Alfredo Martinez, and Antonio Permuy.

Josignacio's career has been covered by international media including Architectural Digest, ARTnews, The Miami Herald, El Nuevo Herald, Diario Las Américas, Arts Coast Magazine, New Miami Times, Arteinformado, Granma, Radio Rebelde, Coral Gables News, the Biscayne Bay Tribune, and The Artisan Magazine.

In addition to published exhibition catalogs, he has been mentioned in books such as Asbury Park: A Century of Change and included in The Review of Inter-American Bibliography (1998) by Organization of American States. In 2023 his US career became the subject of the book Josignacio: Genio del Oleo y la Resina. Tomo I (Josignacio: Genius of Oil and Resin. Volume 1).

Josignacio's career has been the subject of several film documentaries in English and Spanish including Josignacio: Las Formas del Color (2008; by Art Work Productions and directed by Roberto J. Cayuso), as well as Josignacio: The Master of Colors (2010) by Calico Productions and directed by Daniel Urdanivia. He has also been featured in the documentaries La Pintura Cubana (2006) Art Work Productions and Los pintores cubanos: Dos siglos de pintura cubana by Latin American Art Consultants. Josignacio has also written published letters in support of other artists, including Alfredo Martinez and Edel Alvarez Galban.

The Vasari Project maintains archives relating to Josignacio's career due to their cultural significance to South Florida and the Cuban community. The Vasari Project is overseen by the Miami-Dade Public Library System to document artistically significant records pertaining to the Miami-Dade County region from the Post-World War II era through to the present.

=== Social causes and charity work ===
Josignacio contributed to social charities by donating his artworks to raise funds for various causes.

Within months of his arrival to Miami art scene, art historian and former Miami Herald art critic Helen Kohen wrote about Josignacio's dedication to help raise money for AIDS patients of Genesis Project in 1990, six months after his arrival to the United States. These auctions, held at InterContinental Hotel Miami, were presided by Julio Hernandez Rojo and Dolores C. Smithies.

Since 1996, Josignacio has been a fundraiser for the Miami Children's Hospital. He has also worked on behalf of earthquake victims and hurricane victims. In 2017, a portion of the proceeds from the sale of his painting Smooth Guitar was donated to aid those affected by Hurricane Irma.

=== Public art ===
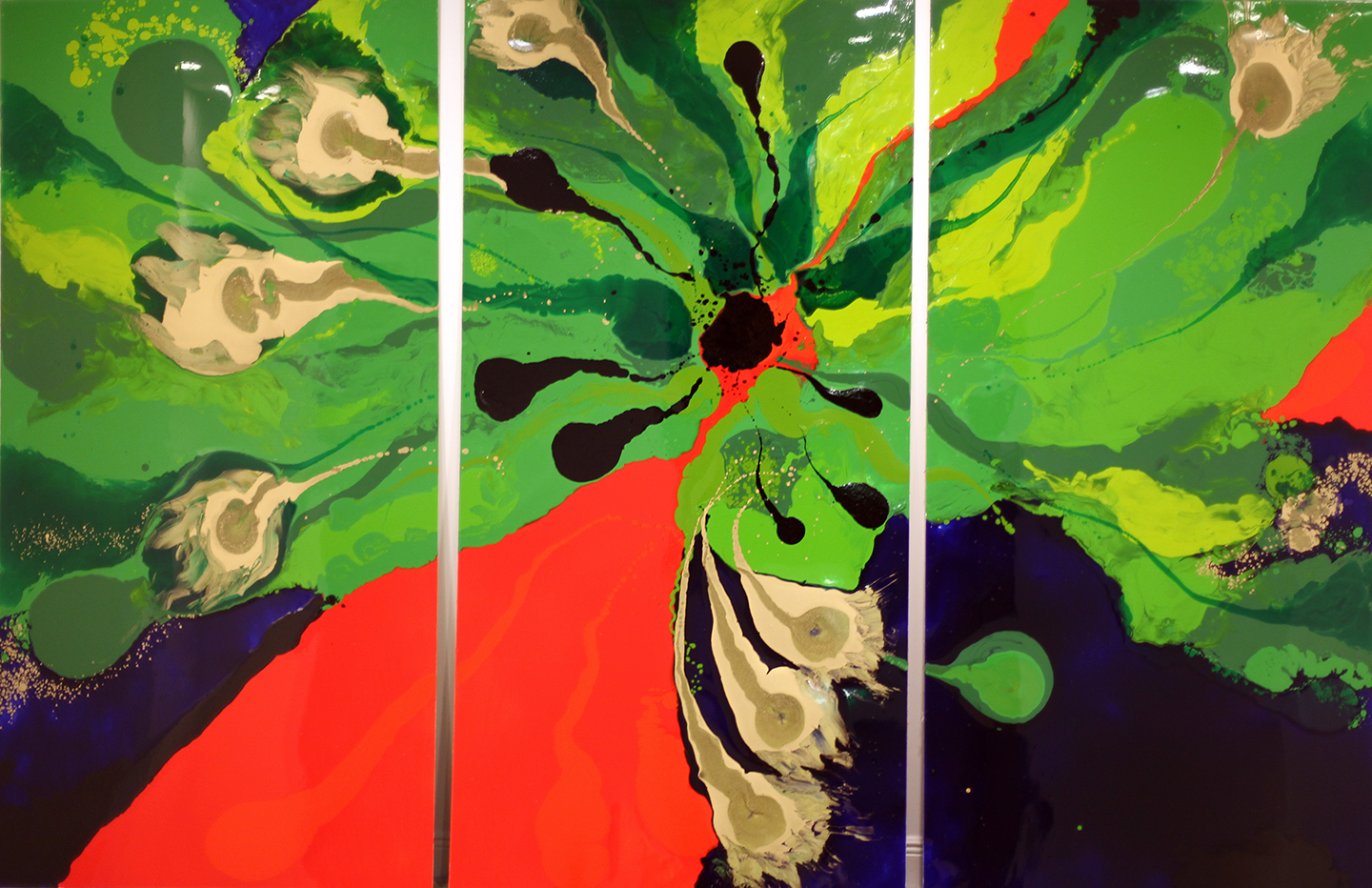
Tree of Life 2011. Public art triptych featured in Asbury Park Transportation Center, Asbury Park, NJ.

In 2011, Josignacio produced an 8-foot x 12 foot mural titled Tree of Life in Asbury Park, New Jersey. This triptych represents a convergence of the past, present and future, to create an image of humanity, and is dedicated to the children of Asbury Park. Tree of Life is permanently located at the Asbury Park Transportation Center on Main Street in Asbury Park, New Jersey. Tree of Life was the first artwork to be exhibited in the Asbury Park Transportation Center and is valued at US$180,000.

In 2017, Josignacio donated a diptych of José Martí to the permanent collection of the Biblioteca Nacional de Cuba José Martí (the José Martí National Library of Cuba). The diptych was inspired by a quote from Martí: “Mi verso es de un verde claro y de un carmín encendido” ("My verse is light green and burning carmine”), which defined the joint color field background of the works. They were unveiled in the exhibition “Martí visto por Josignacio” (Martí seen by Josignacio) at the El Reino de Este mundo Gallery, of the National Library of Cuba.

=== Awards ===
- 1979, 1980 - First prize in painting at the Escuela Vocacional Militar Camilo Cienfuegos (EVMCC) de Guanabacoa, Havana.
- 1996 - Awarded the Best in Show Prize at Hortt 38 juried art show exhibition at the Museum of Art Fort Lauderdale in Florida.

=== Auction records ===
As a blue chip artist, his large scale works have recurrently surpassed $100,000 at auction since the 2010s. Within the category of Contemporary art, Josignacio was ranked by Artprice in the top 500 global rankings for the Contemporary Art Market in 2015 and 2016, as well as number 294 of the Top 1000 Contemporary Artists in 2020.

On December 23, 2014, Josignacio's The Three Wisest Monkeys (1991) was sold for a hammer price of $720,000 at Pangaea Auction House in Las Vegas, Nevada, and set Josignacio as the highest achieved auction price by a living Cuban artist globally, surpassing Tomás Sánchez who previously held the record at $540,000. Another work, Sweet Adagio in Solo Guitar (1994), from his Guitar series, sold for $630,000 that year.

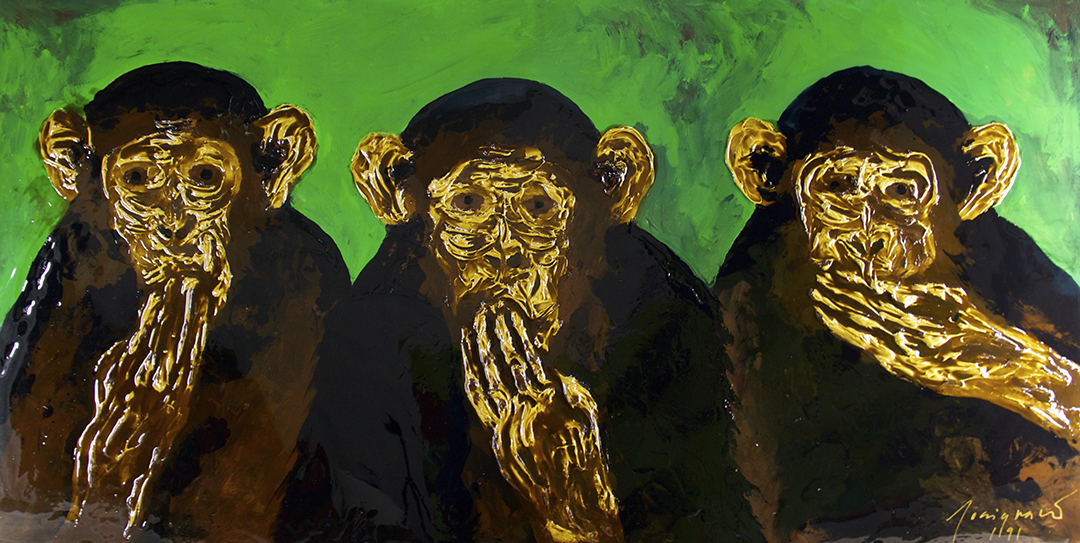
The Three Wisest Monkeys. Sold for US$720,000 in Las Vegas on December 23, 2014.

In 2015, nine of Josignacio's works collectively attained a total of $2,152,500 at auction. Of them, Les Clefs du Succès (The Keys of Success) (2011) from his Keys series, sold on December 15, 2015, for a hammer price of $574,750 at Miami Auction Gallery, Miami, Florida. This placed it among the top ten highest auction sales for works by Cuban artists in 2015.

On March 10, 2016, Josignacio's The Music is Timeless (1989), another of his Guitar series, sold for a hammer price of US$3,481,205.00 at McCarthy-Williams Auctions in London. This is currently the highest price attained for a painting by a living Latin American artist and the first to surpass US$3 million. It had been estimated to sell between $480,000 and $620,000.

On July 7, 2016, Josignacio's Rostro (1989), sold for a hammer price of US$2,329,200.00 at McCarthy-Williams Auctions, London and surpassed its estimate range of $600,000 to US$850,000.

== Other art ventures ==
For commercial art commissions, Josignacio launched and trademarked his brand under the corporate name "Josignacio Art Studio." Through this name, the artist has produced commissioned commercial, decorative art and ornamental art in addition to his fine art works.

These commercial works include original furniture, frames, and mirrors made in the mediums of wood, cork, reed, cane, wicker, horn, bone, shell, amber, mother-of-pearl, and meerschaum as well as plastics. He has also been commissioned to design the cover illustration for books.

His art corporation is filed and registered in the state of Florida. It was initially launched as Josignacio Art Studio, Inc. in 1994 and based in Coral Gables.

In 2021, the firm was reorganized and relaunched as Josignacio Art Studio LLC. and is now based in Miami Beach.

== Select exhibitions ==
=== Post-1990 exhibitions ===
Following his arrival in the United States and early inclusion in a 1990 AIDS charity auction at the InterContinental Hotel Miami, Josignacio participated in group exhibitions at the controversial Cuban Museum of Arts and Culture as well as several Miami art galleries.

- 2016 - China and its Popular Culture at the Culture Pavilion of the Expocuba which was dedicated to celebrate the 169th anniversary of the arrival of Chinese people to Cuba. Notably, this was the first exhibition of Josignacio in Cuba after working in the US for more than 26 years. The exhibition depicted the 12 signs of the Chinese Zodiac. Additionally, there was an interpretation of the fenghuang, a koi fish, a butterfly, and a panda bear. The opening words of the exhibition were held by the Ambassador of the People's Republic of China in Havana, Cuba, Mr. Zhang Tuo.
- 2016 - De Douceur Á Intense was personally commissioned for the 25th Anniversary of the International Ballet Festival of Havana [58] in October 2016, by the historically revered prima ballerina assoluta and founder of the Cuban National Ballet, Alicia Alonso. This twenty-one painting exhibition from Josignacio's "Dance Series" captured both dramatic and poignant moments from the most relevant classical ballets, including Swan Lake, Giselle, Don Quixote and Carmen. The exhibition was held in "La Sala Ernesto Lecuona," at the Gran Teatro de La Habana, Cuba.
- 2017 - El Renacer del Ave Fénix (Rebirth of the Phoenix) to celebrate the new Chinese year 2017 "Fire Rooster" (28 January -15 February 2018) Commissioned by its director Dr. Teresa Li, this Josignacio exhibition was held in Casa de las Artes y Tradiciones Chinas (House of Arts and Chinese Traditions), in the heart of Havana's Chinatown. The opening words of the exhibition were given by Mr. Chen Xi [66], the new Ambassador of the People's Republic of China and ethnologist and author, Dr. Natalia Bolívar. Cuban government representatives were also present at the opening. The key artwork of this exhibition, Fenix, a part of Josignacio's "Signs Series," was acquired by Casa de las Artes y Tradiciones Chinas (House of Arts and Chinese Traditions), Havana, Cuba, for public display in its permanent collection.
- 2017 - For the 75th Anniversary of Havana's renown La Bodeguita del Medio as part of the festivities to commemorate this event, an acquisition of Josignacio's work titled Mojito, a semi-figurative painting depicting this traditional drink, was included and is now on permanent display.
- 2017 – Siete Adagios para Safo y Ganimedes ("Seven Adagios for Sappho and Ganymede") Despite the controversy of homosexuality's delicate theme in communist Cuba, a collection of Josignacio's seven neo-figurative large format Guitars, curated by journalist and writer, Yoel Almaguer de Armas and Lic. in Art History, Diana Rosa Crespo, was exhibited in the Karl Marx Theatre. Along with Josignacio's signature forms and colors, the selection was specifically chosen to represent the seven colors of the rainbow, symbolic of the colors of the LGBTQ (Lesbian, Gay, Bisexual, Transgender and Queer) flag, which characterizes the world LGBTQ movement. The Rainbow Flag, also known as the LGBTQ flag, has represented gay and lesbian communities since the late 1970s. The flag was designed by artist Gilbert Baker and popularized in 1978. These artworks are part of Josignacio's extensive series of Guitars called “Rainbow Guitars.” He did this exhibition in support of equal rights and the acceptance of those discriminated against in his native homeland. Led by Mariela Castro Espin, head of the Cuban National Center for Sex Education (CENESEX), the exhibition was intended to signal the Cuban government's intention to open up human rights issues. The reason for Josignacio's exhibition title "Seven Adagios for Sappho and Ganymede" is that the musical term adagio indicates that music is to be played slowly, reminding us of the same slow process of LGBTQ acceptance and its two primary characters. The real Sappho of Mytilene, also known as Sappho of Lesbos, was a Greek poet who has historically been identified by many as the symbol of female homosexuality. The mythological Ganymede became the lover of the God Zeus.
- 2021 - Art Basel Miami 2021, Miami Beach FL.
- 2024 - Flora & Fauna, Creative Pinellas, Largo FL
- 2024 - Forbidden Fruit, World Erotic Art Museum, Miami Beach FL. The largest-documented exhibition of Cuban erotic art. Featured four generations of leading Cuban artists including Wifredo Lam, Carlos Enriquez, Rene Portocarrero, Mario Carreño, Victor Manuel, Amelia Peláez, Roberto Fabelo, Manuel Mendive, Agustín Fernández, Baruj Salinas, Juan Gonzalez, Jose Mijrares, Lourdes Gomez Franca, Yamilet Sempe, Adriano Nicot, and AGalban.
- 2025 - Prelude: An Introduction to the Permanent Collection, Tampa Museum of Art, Tampa FL

== Writings and essays ==
- 2016 - "Delirium" by Lic. in Art History and Journalist Eliset García Deulofeu
- 2016 - "Plastic Paint Medium: una revolución tecno-pictórica creada en Cuba" by Lic. in Art History, Journalist and writer Yoel Almaguer de Armas
- 2017 - "Josignacio y la boca abierta"
- 2017 - "Siete guitarras contra la homofobia y la transfobia" by Lic. in Art History, Journalist and writer Yoel Almaguer de Armas and Lic. in Art History Diana Rosa Crespo
- 2017 - "El Martí de Josignacio"
- 2017 - An extraordinary artistic product "Un extraordinario producto artístico" by Nathalie Sánchez. Published November 6, 2017 Tribuna de La Habana
- 2017 - "Martí visto por Josignacio".
- 2017 - "Visiones de Martí"
- 2017 - "Martí visto por Josignacio en el alma del arte que acrisola y enaltece"
- 2018 - "La identidad de un creador" by Nathalie Mesa
- 2018 - “El Martiano Josignacio”
- 2018 - "Martí vs Dos Ríos" Painting of Josignacio selected to illustrate the cover and back cover of the Volume 1 (2018) of the National Library of Cuba's magazine
