= Ricardo Pau-Llosa =

American poet

- Born: May 17, 1954 (age 72); Havana
- Occupations: Poet, art critic

Ricardo Pau-Llosa (born May 17, 1954, in Havana, Cuba, lived in the United States since December 1960) is a Cuban-American poet, art critic of Latin American art in the US and Europe, art collector, and author of short fiction.

== Early life and education ==
Pau-Llosa was born into a working-class family in Havana. In 1960 Pau-Llosa fled Cuba with his parents, older sister, and maternal grandmother — all of whom emerge in his autobiographical poems of exile and remembrance. He graduated from Belén Jesuit Preparatory High School in Miami in 1971, and went on to major in English (literature) at various universities, among them Florida International University (BA, 1974), Florida Atlantic University (MA, 1976), and the University of Florida (1978–1981).

== Career and writings ==
Following his gradation from Belen Jesuit and during his studies in Florida International University, Pau-Llosa was active in the establishment of the early Latin American art market in South Florida. He frequently visited early Latin art venues such as the Permuy and Bacardi galleries. He published his first book of poetry, Sorting Metaphors (Anhinga Press, 1983), won the first national Anhinga Prize for Poetry selected by William Stafford. He published a second book of poetry in Bread of the Imagined (Bilingual Press, 1992). His third book of poems, Cuba (Carnegie Mellon U Press, 1993), was nominated for the Pulitzer Prize. His latest collections are Mastery Impulse (2003) and Parable Hunter (2008), both from Carnegie Mellon.

Ricardo Pau-Llosa and Enrico Mario Santí have published a bilingual volume of poetry, "Intruder between Rivers/Intruso entre rios", with Pau-Llosa's English originals and Santí's translations of "Cuban" poems which present bilingual poetry with Cuban or Cuban exile themes casting Pau-Llosa's elegant English prosody into the original Cuban Spanish of both memory and daily experience. This book collects 25 of Cuban American poet Ricardo Pau-Llosa's excellent poems along with its translations into Cuban Spanish by poet-scholar Enrico Mario Santí.

== Art collection ==
Pau-Llosa has also been active in the world of the visual arts, as a writer, curator, and collector. He has amassed a significant collection of works by artists from across the Western Hemisphere. The confluence of his activities as a poet and art critic was the subject of a 2010 exhibition at the Snite Museum of Art at the University of Notre Dame, Parallel Currents: Highlights of the Ricardo Pau-Llosa Collection of Latin American Art. Included were works by Jesús Soto, Enrique Castro-Cid, Rogelio Polesello, Olga de Amaral, José Bedia, Arnaldo Roche Rabell, Julio Rosado del Valle, Wilson Bigaud, Rafael Coronel, Maria Brito, Alexander Gregoire, Marcelo Bordese, Miguel Ronsino, Nicolás Leiva, Fernando de Szyszlo, Agustín Cárdenas, Agustín Fernández, Antonio Henrique Amaral, Miguel Von Dangel, Melquiades Rosario Sastre, Ana Isabel Martén, Ricardo Avila, Juan José Molina, Carlos Rojas, Marta Minujín, José Mijares, and Paul Sierra.

Pau-Llosa's collection also includes works by North American artists Leon Kelly, Clarence Holbrook Carter, Lew Wilson, Ronald González, and Christopher Mangiaracina, as well as Cuban Vanguardia (modernist) artists Mario Carreño, Cundo Bermúdez, Amelia Peláez, Raúl Milián, Víctor Manuel, Guido Llinás, Raúl Martinez, Rafael Soriano, and Emilio Sánchez.

Over the years, Pau-Llosa has also donated artworks to various museums, among them the Snite Museum, The Denver Art Museum, and the Blanton Museum of Art at the University of Texas.

== Additional bibliography ==
- Pérez Firmat, Gustavo, “Home Amid Resemblances: The Poetry of Ricardo Pau-Llosa,” South Atlantic Review 78.3-4 (2015): 35–51. Spanish version: “Hogar entre semblanzas: La poesía de Ricardo Pau-Llosa,” El jardín de los poetas. Revista de teoría y crítica de poesía latinoamericana 6.11 (2020): 118–135.
- "Tropic of Tropes: A Conversation with Poet & Art Critic Ricardo Pau-Llosa," The Writer's Chronicle, 42:4, Feb, 2010.
- Mastrapa, Armando F., "Ricardo Pau-Llosa: Miami's Poet, Whether He Likes It or Not," Saw Palm, vol.4, Spring 2010.
- ________. "Ricardo Pau-Llosa: The Rebel Without an Inferiority Complex," TheAmericano.com posted Oct. 13, 2009.
- Milián, Alberto. "Defying Time and History: Ricardo Pau-Llosa." Interview, Manoa, 15.1 (2003).
- Pau-Llosa, Ricardo. Clarence Holbrook Carter. New York: Rizzoli, 1989. With Frank Trapp and Douglas Dreishpoon.
- ________. Rafael Soriano: The Poetics of Light. Miami: Ediciones Habana Vieja, 1998.
- ________. "To Dwell in Passing: The Art of Hugo Consuegra" in Hugo Consuegra. Miami: Ediciones Universal, 2006.
- ________. "The Music of the Eye, or the Emergence of the Thaumaturgical Object" in Olga de Amaral: el manto de la memoria (Olga de Amaral: The Mantle of Memory). Bogotá: Ediciones Zona & Seguros Bolívar, 2000.
- ________. "Five Decades, Five Myths" TheAmericano.com, translation of article which appeared in Spanish in El Mundo, Medellín, Colombia, July 7, 2009.
- Pérez, Rolando,"Ricardo Pau-Llosa (1954-)." The Encyclopedia of Caribbean Literature. Vol. 2: M-Z. Ed. D.H. Figueredo. Westport, CT: Greenwood Press, 2006.
- Pau-Llosa, Ricardo and Enrico Mario Santi (2017). "Intruder Between Rivers/Intruso entre rios". Cuban Research Institute, 2017.
