= Miguel Rodez =

Cuban artist (born 1956)

- Born: November 12, 1956; Havana, Cuba
- Education: Miami-Dade Community College (A.A.), University of Miami (B.A.), Indiana University (J.D.)
- Occupations: Visual artist, curator, commentator, former civil servant, former attorney, former candidate for public office
- Known for: Painting, drawing, sculpture, public advocacy
- Notable work: Custom-made Paradise, Lucky Link, Forever Dalí, XX Century Masters (series), Imagine Liberation (series)
- Movement: Pattern and Decoration, Surrealism (painting), Minimalist-Dadaism (sculpture)

Miguel Rodez (born November 12, 1956) is a Cuban born contemporary visual artist, curator, and former attorney who has resided in the United States since 1969. Artistically, Rodez is known for his textured luminescent paintings and his Minimalist-Dadaist sculptures. Among his most displayed works are Custom-made Paradise, his round portrait of Spanish Surrealist Salvador Dalí from Rodez's XX Century Masters series, and the sensual kinetic giant inflatable sculpture Lucky Link from his Imagine Liberation series. He has written several published articles on art, law, and community issues and has been an Editor in Chief for law magazines and publications.

== Biography ==
Miguel Rodez was born in 1956 in the Casablanca area of Havana, Cuba as the first of four children, with one brother and two sisters. From the age of four, Rodez showed an early inclination toward the arts and was supported by his parents as he regularly spent hours drawing and painting. On the eve of Thanksgiving Day 1969 Rodez and his family relocated to New York City under the Freedom Flights refugee program. In New York City, Rodez sought to attend an art school and pursue a career as a visual artist and architect. He was subsequently accepted and briefly attended the High School of Art and Design in close proximity to the Museum of Modern Art. However, family circumstances kept him from remaining enrolled and, as a result, Rodez is an autodidactic artist.

In 1972, his family moved briefly to Union City, New Jersey and then in 1973 to Miami, Florida. In Miami, Rodez graduated from Miami Beach Senior High School in 1975 and weighed whether to pursue art or a legal career. He ultimately settled on a legal career, as this would not prevent him from creating art. He subsequently pursued several degrees in higher education, first enrolling at Miami-Dade Community College, where he obtained an Associate of Arts Degree in Business Administration, summa cum laude in 1979. He then attended the University of Miami where he majored in history, with minors in English and Philosophy and graduated with honors in 1981. While at the University of Miami, Rodez also took Art History Courses and a figure drawing class. Rodez went on to obtain a Doctor of Jurisprudence at Indiana University in 1985.

Rodez subsequently became an attorney in 1986 and opened his law practice devoted to representing mostly underprivileged clients. Rodez also engaged in various forms of public service, often related to the arts, such as serving on multiple community boards.

In November 1994, Miguel Rodez obtained a quasi-judicial position in the United States Immigration and Naturalization Service (later known as the Citizenship and Immigration Services). In 1996, he ran for Circuit Court Judge, an election he narrowly lost. Therefore, he continued his career with the Federal Government. In 1997, Rodez founded CABA Briefs magazine for the Cuban American Bar Association. In 2007, he began producing artwork professionally and by 2010, he had two careers simultaneously. During this period, Rodez worked at his CIS post, participated in a multitude of art exhibitions, and also curated over two dozen art shows. In 2018, he retired early from his position with the CIS to pursue his art career full time. Since then, Rodez has developed an extensive art record that has been covered by media and analyzed by art critics.

== Art career overview ==
Rodez showed artistic inclinations from an early age. After leaving Cuba for the United States with his family in 1969, Rodez briefly attended New York City's High School of Art and Design. However, his attendance at that school was cut short, as his family had moved to Union City, New Jersey and later to Miami. Consequently, Rodez never received specialized art training with the exception of a figure drawing course at the University of Miami while majoring in history.

Following his graduation from Miami Beach Senior High School in 1975, Rodez returned to New York City for two years yet struggled to support himself as an artist, leading him to instead to pursue his other interest of becoming an attorney in South Florida. During his legal career Rodez continued painting and supporting the arts. While working as a lawyer and later in as civil servant, Rodez supported non-profit cultural and legal organizations. He served as the Chairperson of the Miami Symphony Orchestra while it was directed by Manuel Ochoa. In 1994, Miguel Rodez and Alberto Bustamante co-founded Herencia Magazine for the Cuban Heritage Foundation. He also served as the editor, designer, and illustrator for CABA Briefs magazine for the Cuban American Bar Association. From 1994 to 2000, Rodez served on the board of trustees for Art in Public Places at Miami Dade County, where he was elected the Board's Chairperson in 1997. During his tenure at Art in Public Places, Rodez participated in selecting artists to be commissioned to create major public art projects for Miami Dade County. Most notable among the projects are: Jose Bedia, Cundo Bermudez, Gary Moore, Anna Valentina Murch, and Robert Rahway Zakanitch for The Adrienne Arsht Center for the Performing Arts; Carlos Alves, Connie Lloveras, Buster Simpson for the Miami-Dade Metrorail and Metromover Stations; Miami International Airport’s A Walk of the Beach by Michelle Oka Donner; and Airport Sound Wall by Martha Schwartz, among others.

In 2007, Rodez decided to pursue two careers as an artist in addition to his civil service post. He entered the professional arts field with pieces featuring elements of Dadaism and Minimalism. His first professional creation from this period was Time Machine (2007), a large wheeled conceptual sculpture that explores time travel. He later temporarily merged the piece with another to form an installation titled Knowledge Quest (2007).

In 2010 Rodez rented a space in the studio of Yovani Bauta and began to produce artwork and to exhibit extensively. Then, in 2012, he opened his own gallery and studio space in Miami's Bird Road Art District, where he curated solo and collective shows and often contributed his own works. That same year Rodez also held a charity exhibition of his Imagine Liberation series in the Miami Design District to support the Big Brothers Big Sisters of America non-profit. Rodez's work can be found in the permanent collection of several fine art institutions and private collections including the Favalora Museum at St. Thomas University, Florida International University’s Green Library Special Collections and Honors College Collection, and the Flores Carbonel Collection. The University of Miami Cuban Heritage Collection also holds records relating to Rodez’s career in its archives due to its significance to the Cuban community.

=== Curatorship ===
Miguel Rodez’s work in public art selection eventually led him to become a curator who has received reviews from critics. This public art involvement began with the Metropolitan Miami Dade County Art in Public Places Trust, a quasi-governmental entity that is responsible for the commission and purchase of artworks by contemporary artists in all media at Miami Dade. As a Trust Board Member, Rodez helped oversee the program’s operation. This included voting on whether or not to approve public art acquisitions, commissions, project funding, and on restoration and maintenance of existing public art. The budget for projects ranged from below $100,000 to several million dollars. Rodez joined the Art in Public Places Trust as a Board Member in 1994, became its Chairperson in 1997, and served the program until 2000.

Rodez has since participated in selecting artwork for inclusion in various exhibits and as a juror for the purpose of conferring art awards. This included his service as a juror for the largest street art festival in the United States, The Coconut Grove Arts Festival (selection date October 17, 2018); Nineteenth Annual Cuba Nostalgia Art Competition (May 19, 2017); Carnival on the Mile, art fair (March 4, 2017); Ludlam Lights, Annual Art Lantern Competition (February 25, 2017); Art of Found Objects Exhibit (March 29, 2016); Broward Art Guild’s “Food for Thought exhibit” (March 6, 2015); and Carlos Albizu University’s Art Fest @ Doral (November 7, 2014 and November 15, 2013).

Rodez has curated over 35 art exhibits, including exhibitions and presentations held at museums, cultural venues and a gallery space he managed at the Bird Road Art District from 2012 to 2018. Among the most notable exhibits that Rodez organized and presented were the ones held at academic venues. Miguel Rodez curated two exhibits - “Dealing with Reality” (August 1, 2019) and “Open Discourse” – at the Favalora Museum at St. Thomas University. He curated two exhibits – “Eight Visual Paths” (April 20, 2019) and “Reference Cited” (September 8, 2018) – at Florida International University’s Steven & Dorothea Green Library. He curated “What’s on Your Palette,” (November 30, 2017) a 140-artists exhibit held at the Milander Center for the Arts. He also curated two exhibits – Art Fest @ Doral 2013 and 2014 – at Carlos Albizu University.

During the six years that he operated Miguel Rodez Art Projects, his art space became a popular venue. There Rodez hosted several exhibits and gained the notice of Frommers Travel Guide for Miami that encouraged Miami travelers to visit his space in its 2014 edition. One show that Rodez organized to honor Spanish Surrealist Salvador Dalí drew the attention of The Dalí Museum, which commented on the exhibit. Some of the shows also drew reviews and coverage from ArtDistricts Magazine, Nagari Magazine, Miami Art Guide, and leading Spanish-language newspaper El Nuevo Herald.

In November 2019, Latin American Art Magazine published a bilingual article authored by Miguel Rodez regarding the role of a curator. He also co-authored an article on ArtDistricts Magazine on the emerging Bird Road Art District. Based on his curatorial experience, Rodez has been asked to comment on articles by El Nuevo Herald, such as reviews of Cuban artist Sergio Chávez' Beyond Innocence exhibition and a cultural festival honoring renown Cuban Master Amelia Peláez.

== Legal career ==
In 1981 Miguel Rodez enrolled the Maurer School of Law, one of the oldest law schools in the United States and located at Indiana University’s Bloomington campus. There, Rodez obtained his Doctor of Jurisprudence 1985. In 1986, he received his license to practice law in Florida after passing the Florida Bar Exam. Soon after, Rodez opened a private practice in Miami and later Coral Gables, Florida. During the years that he worked as an attorney, Rodez represented mostly elderly and underprivileged clients regarding a wide variety of legal matters.

Early in his legal career, Rodez became involved with the Cuban American Bar Association (CABA). Rodez was later elected to its Board of Directors by a majority of its over 700 members. In 1994, Rodez served as chair of the multi-ethnic outreach committee of the Transit 2020 Coalition advocating for the Miami Metro transit system. That year he closed his legal practice and accepted a quasi-judicial position with the United States federal government, where he worked at his new civil servant position within the Citizenship and Immigration Services (formerly known as the Immigration and Naturalization Service). While working for the CIS, Rodez conducted research, engaged in analysis and wrote assessments regarding human rights issues in cases where parties appeared before him, with or without an attorney. In this role, Rodez accepted numerous overseas assignments to do similar work in Europe, Asia, and the Middle East. During his tenure Rodez received various service awards, including a national employee award from United States Attorney General Janet Reno on April 28, 1995. Rodez also headed the performance-evaluation team that mentored new asylum officers and presided over more than 700 hearings.

In 1996, while still working for the Federal government, Miguel Rodez ran for Circuit Court Judge in Miami-Dade County, Florida. In that contest, The Miami Herald’s Editorial Board supported both candidates stating “No matter which candidate they elect, in our judgement voters can hardly go wrong in this contest” and “whoever loses this race […] it won’t be the voters.” While Rodez reportedly meet with over 15,000 voters during his campaign, he ultimately lost that election to Leon Firtel. Following his electoral loss, Rodez continued to work at his Civil Service post with the CIS.

During his legal career Rodez was also a member of the Florida Bar's Long Range Planning Committee and in the mid-1990s served as a co-editor for The Dade County Bar Association's newspaper, the DCBA Bulletin. There, Rodez helped in editing articles on various legal issues written by other attorneys and legal scholars. He also authored judicial profiles highlighting various judges, including Circuit Court Judge Stan Blake. In 1997, while serving on CABA's board of directors, Rodez founded the organization's news magazine CABA Briefs. Rodez was subsequently one of the main figures during the magazine's founding years when he served as its editor, main contributor, layout designer and illustrator. After two years he resigned to work on other community service projects and his ongoing role in the CIS. In his capacities as an advocate, former political candidate, editor, and leading member of several public boards, Rodez has penned several published opinion-editorials for the Miami Herald and was also covered by El Nuevo Herald. After 23 years, Rodez retired from his civil service position in 2018 and returned his focus exclusively to art.

== Art analysis ==
Miguel Rodez is a multidisciplinary autodidactic visual artist. Over the course of his career, his artwork has been covered by The Miami Herald, El Nuevo Herald, international tourist guide Frommers, The Miami Laker, Art Districts Magazine, ArtFix Daily, Art Talk, and several art critics. Rodez works in various media including drawing, monotype, painting, installation, sculpture, and fine arts photography. The most notable feature consistent through much of Miguel Rodez's work is his use of texture, which is central to his defined artistic style. The surfaces of his canvases, which are often round (called “tondos”), show textured brushstrokes overlaid with pigment-rich iridescent paint. Rodez frequently works in series. His Twentieth Century Masters series is a collection of monumental round portraits depicting famous visual artists of the period. This includes portraits of Jean-Michel Basquiat, Marc Chagall, Salvador Dalí, Frida Kahlo, Pablo Picasso, Andy Warhol, and famed fellow Cuban artist Wifredo Lam. Aldo Menendez, a Cuban artist and critic regarded as a leading voice in Cuban art in the United States, reviewed Miguel Rodez's portrait series exhibited at St. Thomas University’s Sardiñas Gallery. According to Menendez, “[Miguel Rodez] is an artist in full maturity and mastery of his trade, with several exhibitions and stages behind him and a particular stamp on everything.” Among other things, Menendez noticed the irony in Miguel Rodez choice of painting a portrait of Andy Warhol, an artist who disassembled portraits, as he considered them to be merely impersonal objects such as reproductions in a newspaper or a ticket, while Miguel Rodez demonstrates a desire to recreate the portrait again as a healthy, careful interrogation executed with a holistic philosophy.

The Imagine Liberation series explores an imaginary quest for freedom. This series utilizes imagery that envisions the perspective of someone trapped in an unfavorable circumstance and dreams of the moment when the chains that bind one rupture and freedom is gained. Art critic Carlos Suarez de Jesus opined that “The reductive, serial quality of this series is deceptively simple while intrinsically profound. These works succeed in evoking the sublime through monochromatic forms, effortless beauty, tactile surfaces, and range of scale.” Suarez de Jesus noted: “Nelson Mandela’s harsh years in prison taught him something about the indomitable will of the spirit. He said of his experience: ‘For to be free is not merely to cast off one’s chains, but to live in a way that respects and enhances the freedom of others.’ Suarez de Jesus added, “Instead of conveying a sense of instability and restlessness in his work, through the process of much thought, Rodez captures the spirit of Mandela’s sentiment.”

The Escape series, like his Imagine Liberation series seeks to generate a discourse about departure from one's physical or metaphysical location to one of hope. These paintings seek to provide the viewer with visual relief (hence the term “escape”) through the use of calming colors such as cool teals, aqua and blues.

The Floral Sensuality series uses flowers to address human sexuality and gender identification issues in unexpected ways. Intended as a masculine response to Georgia O'Keeffe’s flower series, Rodez likewise infuses sensual qualities to botanical imagery.

His Sweet Vibrations series utilizes harmonic color combinations in conjunction with loose rhythmic patterns. The title of the pieces alludes to musical compositions only for the purpose of identification. Through this seemingly innocuous collection of works, Rodez is challenging the perceptions of the definition of art in a similar way to the Pattern and Decoration art movement of the mid-1970s to mid-1980s.

The Monumental series is Rodez’s exploration of three dimensional form. This collection of sculptures possesses elements of symbolic Minimalism as well as Dadaism. The series’ most notable piece is the colossal 20 foot (approximately six meters) high Lucky Link where Rodez merges the concept of his Imagine Liberation series with his Floral Sensuality series to come up with a kinetic sculpture that uses a link breaking to symbolize freedom as a chain breaks. The piece has been shown multiple times with Alejandro Mendoza's collective group exhibitions Giants in the City alongside other established Miami artists such as Yovani Bauta, Jose Bedia, Tomas Esson, Miguel Fleitas, and Frank Hyder.

Rodez's Forever Dalí is a surrealist installation consisting of four large-scale images of his portrait of Salvador Dalí strategically placed in a deep hallway. The installation conceptually provides Dalí with the eternity that Dalí sought, which was spotlighted by The Dalí Museum on its social media in 2016.

== Selected exhibitions ==
Though he had been creating art for over 30 years by the time he formally launched his professional fine art career in 2007, Miguel Rodez had not exhibited his work until after that point. Since then, Rodez has participated in over 80 exhibitions of his art in fine art galleries, art centers, international art fairs, and public spaces. He has also exhibited alongside established artists such as Laurence Gartel, Rafael Soriano, and Nestor Arenas. His work has been featured in several museums including the Coral Gables Museum, Coral Springs Museum, the Frost Museum Sculpture Garden, the Jewish Museum of Florida, and the Dominican Republic Palace of Fine Arts.

=== Selected solo exhibitions ===
- 10/03/2019 “Arte Orgullo, Master Portraits,” Pridelines Gallery, Miami Florida.
- 07/05/2019 “Emerging Harmonies” Miami Lakes Town Hall, Miami Lakes, Florida.
- 03/09/2019 “Painting Provocateurs,” St. Thomas University’s Sardiñas Gallery, Miami, Florida.
- 07/21/2017 “20th Century Masters” Coral Gables Museum, Coral Gables, Florida.
- 07/28/2016 “An Evening with Miguel Rodez,” Steven & Dorothea Green Library, Florida International University, Miami Florida.
- 05/16/2015 “Visual Poetry Project,” Bird Road Art District, Miami, Florida.
- 03/21/2015 “Spring forward,” Bird Road Art District, Miami Florida.
- 09/20/2014 “Power Portraits,” Bird Road Art District, Miami Florida.
- 05/17/2014 “Unveiling Joaquin,” Bird Road Art District, Miami Florida.
- 03/15/2014 “Imagine Liberation” Bird Road Art District, Miami Florida.
- 12/15/2012 “Primal Connection,” Bird Road Art District, Miami Florida.
- 11/17/2012 “Imagine Liberation,” Bird Road Art District, Miami.
- 02/11/2012 “Imagine Liberation,” Majestic Properties, Miami Design District, Miami Florida.
- 05/06/2011 “Imagine Liberation,” Domingo Padron Gallery, Coral Gables Florida.

=== Selected collective exhibitions ===
- 08/21/2020 “Expressions of a Pandemic,” Coral Gables Museum, Coral Gables, Florida.
- 02/15/2020 “Jane Harris Memorial Exhibit,” Harris Art Gallery, Miami Florida.
- 11/09/2019 “Passage to Memory” Caballero Rivero Woodlawn, Miami Florida.
- 10/25/2019 “Searching for Giants,” Ft. Lauderdale and multiple Broward locations, Florida.
- 06/27/2019 “Open Discourse,” Favalora Museum, St. Thomas University, Miami, Florida.
- 06/14/2019 “Resonate: A Polyphonic Prospect,” Coral Gables Museum, Coral Gables, Florida.
- 04/26/2019 Artfields Art Fair, (A’Blooms) Lake City, South Carolina.
- 04/20/2019 “Eight Visual Paths,” Steven & Dorothea Green Library, Florida International University, Miami Florida.
- 02/13/2019 “Inspired By,” The Coral Springs Museum, Coral Springs, Florida.
- 12/07/2018 “Miami Art Week Exhibit,” Hernan Gamboa Gallery, Humboldt International University, Coral Gables, Florida.
- 11/02/2018 “New Horizon 2,” CFA Gallery, 2000 Ponce de Leon Blvd., Coral Gables Florida.
- 10/05/2018 “New Horizon 1,” CFA Gallery, 2000 Ponce de Leon Blvd., Coral Gables Florida.
- 09/28/2018 “La Mano Hispana,” Milander Center for the Arts, Hialeah Florida.
- 09/08/2018 “Reference Cited,” Steven & Dorothea Green Library, Florida International University, Miami Florida.
- 08/03/2018 “Teice Memorial Exhibit,” Milander Center for the Arts, Hialeah Florida.
- 06/02/2018 “Art at Aragon,” Aragon Clubhouse, Hialeah, Florida.
- 06/01/2018 “The Grand Illusion,” CFA Gallery, Coral Gables, Florida
- 04/06/2018 “Journey of an Artist,” CFA Gallery, Coral Gables Florida.
- 03/22/2018 Art at the Icon, Icon Brickell, Miami, Florida.
- 03/08/2018 “And Still I Rise,” Milander Center for the Arts, Hialeah Florida.
- 01/26/2018 “Jose Marti Exhibit,” Milander Center for the Arts, Hialeah.
- 01/25/2018 “BRADICA,” Ignatius Center for the Arts, Belen Jesuit Preparatory School, Miami, Florida.
- 12/06/2017 Miami Art Week, Spectrum, Blink Group, Wynwood, Miami FL
- 11/30/2017 “What’s on your Palette,” Milander Center for the Arts, Hialeah, Florida.
- 11/10/2017 “Dali & I,” MAC Fine Art, Jupiter, Florida.
- 10/27/2017 “Blue Tulip Rescue,” Sarrazino Gallery, Coral Gables, Florida.
- 10/06/2017 “La Mano Hispana,” Milander Center for the Arts, Hialeah, Florida.
- 06/16/2017 “High Frequencies,” Milander Center for the Arts, Hialeah, Florida.
- 04/27/2017 “Hialeah Park Art Collective,” Milander Center for the Arts, Hialeah, Florida.
- 01/27/2017 “Jose Marti Art Exhibit,” Milander Center for the Arts, Hialeah Florida.
- 11/19/2016 “Drawing Exploration, Part II,” Bird Road Art District, Miami Florida.
- 11/07/2016 “Nest-Gen,” FIU, School of Engineering, Miami Florida.
- 10/15/2016 “Drawing Exploration, Part I,” Bird Road Art District, Miami Florida.
- 08/05/2016 “Black & White Exhibit,” Milander Center for the Arts, Hialeah Florida.
- 07/21/2016 “Afterlife of Color II,” Milander Arts Center, Hialeah, Florida.
- 04/21/2016 “Afterlife of Color I,” Milander Arts Center, Hialeah, Florida.
- 02/20/2016 “Hello Dali,” Bird Road Art District, Miami, Florida.
- 01/16/2016 “Facing Dali,” Bird Road Art District, Miami, Florida.
- 11/11/2015 “Badges of Courage,” MANO Fine Art, Miami, FL 33155
- 09/19/2015 “Drawing Excellence,” Bird Road Art District, Miami Florida.
- 03/27/2015 “At Home with Art,” Home Show, Miami Beach Convention Center, Miami Beach, Florida.
- 03/04/2015 “Purim Mask Exhibit,” Jewish Museum of Florida, Miami Beach, Florida.
- 11/16/2014 “Nest-Gen,” Frost Art Museum's Sculpture Garden, Florida International University, Miami, Florida.
- 05/31/2014 “I Shall Walk for You,” Coral Gables Museum, Coral Gables, Florida.
- 05/21/2014 “I Shall Walk for You,” Bacardi Headquarters, Coral Gables, Florida.
- 02/15/2014 “The Kiss,” Bird Road Art District, Miami, Florida.
- 01/25/2014 “Artists Applause,” McCormick Historic Building, Miami, Florida.
- 12/07/2013 “Ocean Drive Art Blast,” Welcome Center Building, Miami Beach, Florida.
- 11/16/2013 “Art Fest @Doral,” Carlos Albizu University, Doral, Florida.
- 11/16/2013 “BLOOM BLAST II,” Bird Road Art District, Miami Florida.
- 10/19/2013 “BLOOM BLAST I,” Bird Road Art District, Miami Florida.
- 10/05/2013 “Rodez & Gross Show, Barry Gross Gallery, Fort Lauderdale, Florida.
- 10/04/2013 “La Mano Hispana,” Milander Center for the Arts, Hialeah Florida.
- 09/21/2013 “Drawing Exploration,” Bird Road Art District, Miami Florida.
- 03/16/2013 “Sexual Currents,” Bird Road Art District, Miami, Florida.
- 02/16/2013 “Passion Red,” Bird Road Art District, 4229 SW 75 Ave, Miami, Florida.
- 01/19/2013 “Face 2 Face,” Bird Road Art District, Miami, Florida.
- 09/15/2012 “Drawn from Within,” Bird Road Art District, Miami Florida.
- 03/01/2012 "Hoy Arte Hoy," Arte Americas, Convention Center, Miami Beach, Florida.
- 03/10/2012 “Open Show,” The Art Link Gallery, Wynwood, Miami, Florida.
- 02/11/2012 “Imagine Liberation,” Majestic Properties, Design District, Miami Florida.
- 01/06/2012 “Art in the Breezeway,” Coral Gables Museum Plaza, Coral Gables, Florida.
- 12/05/2011 “Giants in the City,” Miami Art Week, Bayfront Park, Miami, Florida.
- 11/07/2011 “Sleepless Nights,” Catalina Hotel, Miami Beach, FL 33139
- 09/01/2011 “Artist Blend,” Sunset Fine Art, South Miami, Florida.
- 04/01/2011 “Oriental Focus,” Sunset Fine Art, South Miami, Florida.
- 03/18/2011 Art-Naples Contemporary Art Fair, Naples, Florida.
- 12/02/2010 Miami Independent Thinkers, Miami Art Week, Wynwood, Miami, Florida.
- 08/31/2010 International Art Fair [FIART], Palace of Fine Arts, Dominican Republic.
- 08/03/2010 “Giants in the City,” Miami Beach Botanical Garden, Miami Beach, Florida.
- 07/08/2010 “Wynwood Art Walk,” Kavachnina Gallery, Wynwood, Miami, Florida.

== See also ==
- List of Cuban artists
