= Alfredo Martínez =

Alfredo Martínez may refer to:

- Alfredo Martínez (baseball)
- Alfredo Martínez (politician)
- Alfredo Martinez (art patron)
- Alfredo Martínez Moreno, Salvadoran diplomat, lawyer and jurist
- Fred Martinez, Belizean politician and diplomat

== See also ==
- Alfredo Ramos Martínez, painter, muralist, and educator
