= Carlos Enríquez Gómez =

Cuban artist (1900–1957)

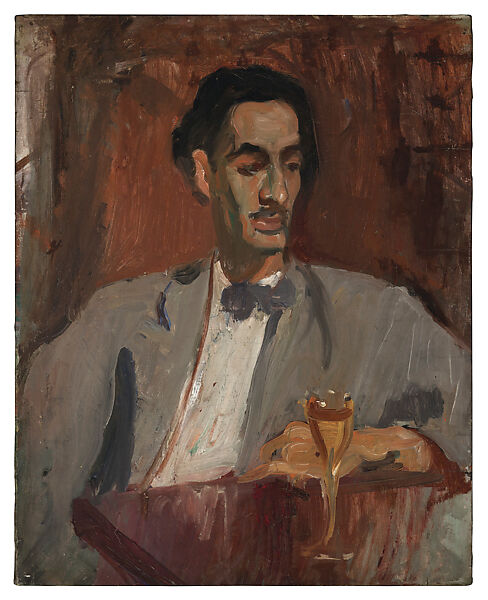
- Portrait of Enríquez, painted in 1926 by American expressionist artist Alice Neel, whom he married in 1925.
- Born: August 3, 1900; Zulueta, Cuba
- Died: May 2, 1957 (aged 56)
- Other name: Carlos Enríquez
- Occupations: Painter, illustrator, writer
- Spouse: Alice Neel (m. 1925–1930; separated)

Carlos Enríquez Gómez (August 3, 1900 – May 2, 1957), was a Cuban painter, illustrator and writer of the Vanguardia movement (the Cuban Avant-garde). Along with Víctor Manuel, Amelia Peláez, Fidelio Ponce, Antonio Gattorno, and other masters of this period, he was involved in one of the most fertile moments in Cuban culture. He is considered by critics to be one of the best, and most original, Cuban artists of the 20th century.

Enríquez strove to develop a genuinely Cuban style that, while fueled by surrealism and modernism, took inspiration from Cuba's landscapes, culture, social problems and way of living. He was also considered a rebel, and was often criticized for the allegedly explicit nature of his nudes, and for his bohemian lifestyle.

== Early years ==
Born in Zulueta, in the former Cuban province of Las Villas, on August 3, 1900 to a wealthy Cuban family, Carlos Enríquez received little academic training, so his art would be considered to be largely self-taught. At a young age he transferred to Havana to complete his bachelor studies, and in 1920 his parents sent him to Philadelphia, where he studied commerce until 1924. At his insistence, he was permitted to study painting at the Pennsylvania Academy, where he took a short summer course. Due to differences with his professors he never finished the course, which was the only formal art education he ever received. He returned home the following year, with fellow painter Alice Neel, whom he married that year.

Soon after his return, he started painting professionally, while working as an accountant at the Lonja del Comercio (Havana's stock exchange). In 1925 he participated in his first exposition, and in 1927 two of his nudes were removed from the Exhibition of New Arts in Havana after being deemed "exaggeratedly realistic". However, 1927 marks the year when the Cuban Vanguardia movement made its first steps, mainly thanks to this exhibition, and many of the artists that participated in it went on to become the leading lights of the movement.

The episode convinced Enríquez to return to the United States. After breaking up with Alice Neel, he returned to Cuba in 1930 with their daughter Isabetta. That same year, another of his exhibitions was aborted due to the allegedly explicit content of his paintings. He again left Cuba, this time for Europe, mainly Spain and France, where he continued his painting career and came in contact with Impressionism and surrealism, currents that would radically influence his work. Some of his best works were produced in this period, including Bacteriological Spring and Virgen del Cobre (which is the patron saint of Cuba).

Abduction of the Mulatto Women; 1938, Carlos Enriquez.

Enriquez returned to Cuba in 1934, and began developing a new pictorial style, which became his trademark. He named it romancero guajiro (countryman's romance), a modernist approach to the stories and colors of the Cuban countryside. As with the other vanguardia artists, re-encountering his native land provided the catalyst for his mature style and his commitment to the expression of Cuban social realities and popular myths. One of his preoccupations as an artist concerned the expression of an authentic Cuban-Caribbean culture, which he believed was only to be found in the countryside, in its Creole people, myths, and legends. Enríquez's romancero guajiro was strongly influenced by some of the core ideas of modernist primitivism. His primitivism, however differs from that of Antonio Gattorno and Eduardo Abela in that it does not represent the guajiros as simple, calm, and noble, but rather as raw, violent, and restless. His painting Rey de los Campos de Cuba (King of the Cuban Fields) received first prize in 1935's National Exposition of Painters and Sculptors.

== Rise to fame and death ==
In 1939 Enriquez bought a small bungalow, which he christened El Hurón Azúl (the Blue Ferret), in the Arroyo Naranjo district on the outskirts of Havana. This remained his home for the rest of his life. Here he painted El Rapto de las Mulatas (The kidnapping of the Mulatto Women), one of his most famous works, featured on a 1964 Cuban stamp. A transposition of the Rape of the Sabine Women to the Cuban fields, it is said that Enríquez had a horse brought to his workshop, tied Sara Cheméndez (his female model at the time) to the horse and had the animal lashed, in order to have a more realistic scene for the painting. The same year, he was again awarded a prize in the National Exhibition (for El Rapto de las Mulatas), and published his first novel, Tilín García.

In the 1940s he wrote two more novels (La Vuelta de Chencho and La Feria de Guaicanama, which were published posthumously in 1960), illustrated books, held conferences and exhibitions in several countries, wrote articles for various magazines, and continued to paint. He also received another prize in 1946's National Exhibition for his painting La Arlequina.

His life was marked by alcoholism. During the 1950s his health weakened, and he suffered several problems with broken bones, allegedly caused by his unregulated way of living. He is said to have had severe financial problems, for the same reason. He died on May 2, 1957, while painting in his study. That same day, a personal exposition was to be inaugurated (it was delayed a month after news of his death). His house in Havana is now a small museum with about 140 paintings by Enríquez, and a number of sketches and writings. The house also acts as the meeting place for a small organization of young Cuban artists, named Hurón Azúl.

== Style ==
Enríquez' signature visual language was mainly composed by fluid lines, overlapping color forms, transparencies and dynamic figure compositions. His works usually aimed at depicting the Cuban countryside's history, myths and folklore. Poor peasants, bandits, sensual women, restless horses, and landscapes of palm trees and rolling hills were his common subjects. One of the foremost examples of Enríquez's romancero guajiro and of his painting in general is El Rapto de las mulatas (1938), in which Enríquez includes some of the above named elements of his iconography: aggressive rural men, sensual mulatto women, restless horses, and windswept landscape of rolling hills. Its heated emotional subject of abduction and potential rape is not only depicted, but forcefully expressed through a personal visual language of pulsating and diaphanous color-forms. Enríquez's paintings are about ecstasy when they are not about violence, for in both themes he identified one of the fundamental characteristics of his latitudes-the strident, orgasmic, experience of finiteness.

He also painted portraits and self-portraits, a large number of nudes, and a handful of still lifes. He described his work in the following manner:

"My work is in a constant state of evolution towards the interpretation of images produced between vigilance and sleep, Nevertheless, I am not a surrealist. Currently, I am interested in interpreting the sensibility of a Cuban, American or continental atmosphere but removed from the methods of the European schools. To do otherwise would be like trying to resolve that which is ours with foreign formulas, for oriental art is as distant from my sensibility (though it may move me) as is the art of Picasso".

Enríquez was also an accomplished writer and illustrator. He published three books and a number of essays and articles. He also provided the illustration artwork for books by Nicolás Guillén and Alejo Carpentier, two famous Cuban writers that were friends of the painter and regularly visited his workshop.

== Collections ==
Enríquez' art started having wide recognition during his lifetime, currently his work is permanently displayed in the following museums and collections around the world:

- Museo Nacional de Bellas Artes de La Habana, Havana, Cuba
- Museum of Modern Art, New York City, New York, U.S.
- The Newark Museum of Art, Newark, New Jersey, U.S.
- El Hurón Azúl, Havana, Cuba
- Cuban Foundation Museum, Daytona Beach, Florida, U.S.
- Cuban Museum of Art and Culture, Miami, Florida, U.S.

A number of Enríquez' paintings and drawings are as well present in several private collections in Cuba, Latin America, the United States and Europe.

== See also ==
- Culture of Cuba
- List of Cubans
