= José María Mijares =

Cuban painter (1921–2004)

- Born: José María Mijares Fernández; 1921; Havana, Cuba
- Died: March 2004 (aged 82–83); Miami, Florida, U.S.
- Education: San Alejandro Academy of Fine Arts
- Known for: Painting, drawing, engraving
- Movement: Concrete art
- Awards: Cintas Fellowship

José María Mijares (born 1921 in Havana, Cuba - d. March, 2004) was a Cuban contemporary visual artist. He began drawing in his adolescent years and entered the San Alejandro Academy of Fine Arts on a scholarship at the age of 16. His greatest influences were the artists of the "Havana School": Carlos Enríquez, René Portocarrero, Cundo Bermúdez, as well as his professors, most notable being modernist painter Fidelio Ponce. He was also a part of the influential group, Los Diez Pintores Concretos (the 10 Concrete Painters), or as they are usually referred to, Los Diez (the 10). Although the group had a relatively short life, 1959–1961, and exhibited together only a few times, they remain an important part of Cuba's art history especially in the pre-Castro years and leading up to the revolution. He left Cuba in 1968, resigning his teaching position at the academy when Fidel Castro came into power. Based in Miami, he continued to be a prolific painter and until his death in 2004, at the age of 82.

== Biography ==
Mijares was born in Havana, Cuba in 1921. He began studying art in 1936 at the San Alejandro Academy of Fine Arts, where his professors included Romañach, Menocal, Valderrama, Ramón Loy, and Caravia. He resided in Miami from 1968 until his death in 2004. Florida International University awarded him with an honorary doctorate in Fine Arts in 2001. He was also awarded the Cintas Fellowship (1970–1971), as well as the National Paintings Prize from the IV National Paintings, Engravings and Sculptures Salon. Mijares’ work has been exhibited at several major shows in Havana, Paris, Caracas, Port-au-Prince (Haiti), São Paulo, Tokyo, Washington D.C., and Miami, among other cities.

“Mijares is primarily a colorist, pure color constituting the substance of the forms of his creation. Drawing as a rule provides firm support, bold outlines giving definition and meaning to the whole. His thematic material is biological in character, based on living organisms: the life latent with no static form imparts a poetic mystery to his compositions .... As a colorist, Mijares continues a tradition long identified with his country. He gives new meaning to the language of the past, however, fashioning it into expressions that transcend boundaries of both time and place.”

== Selected exhibitions ==
1996

- Mijares En Grande, Alfredo Martinez Gallery, Coral Gables, FL (solo)

1993

- Cuba Through Her Artists, La Bohème Fine Art, Coral Gables, FL

1991

- Art Miami, Miami, FL
- Marpad Art Gallery, Coral Gables, FL

1987

- Latin American Treasures, The Center for the Fine Arts, Miami, FL
- Outside Cuba, Office of Hispanic Arts, Rutgers University, NJ

1981–1982

- The Bass Museum of Art, Miami Beach, FL
- The Cuban Me Fine Arts, Miami, FL
- Outside Cuba, a traveling exhibition inaugurauseum of Art and Culture, Miami, FL

1979

- De Armas Gallery, Miami, FL
- La Petite Galerie, Miami, FL
- Meeting Point Gallery, Coral Gables, FL

1978

- Lowe Museum, University of Miami, Coral Gables, FL
- The Miami-Dade Public Library, Miami, FL
- The Museum of Modern Arts of Latin America, Washington, D.C
- The Bacardi Gallery, Miami, FL

1971–1973

- Exhibit with the Gala Group, Gloria Luria Gallery and the Bacardi Gallery

1968

- Generations of Cuban Painters, Koubek Center, Miami, FL
- 10 Cuban Painters, The Bacardi Gallery, Miami, FL; Washington, D.C.
- Antilla Gallery, San Juan, Puerto Rico

1956

- Venice Biennal, Venice, Italy

1953

- Sao Paul Biennal, Sao Paul, Brazil

1950

- Museum of Modern Art, Paris, France

1947

- Lyceum Lawn Tennis Club, Havana, Cuba

1944

- Conservatorio Nacional Hubert de Blanck, Havana, Cuba (solo)

== Bibliography ==
- artnet.com, Jose Maria Mijares Biography. http://www.artnet.com/artists/jose-maria-mijares/biography.
- Kendall Art Center The Rodriguez Collection
- La Galeria Cuban Fine Art. Biography Painter Jose Maria Mijares. Jose Maria Mijares Biography & Full Exhibition List
