= Antonio Gattorno =

Cuban painter

- Born: March 15, 1904; Havana, Cuba
- Died: April 5, 1980 (aged 76); New Bedford, Massachusetts
- Known for: Painting
- Notable work: Dolores (1919), La Siesta (1940), Hitler's Portrait (1942)
- Movement: Modernism, Primitivism
- Awards: Watson F. Blair Purchase Prize (1936)

Antonio Gattorno (March 15, 1904 – April 5, 1980) was a Cuban painter. He was a distinguished member of the first generation of modern Cuban painters.

== Early life ==
He studied at the San Alejandro Academy of Fine Arts in Havana before winning a scholarship, in 1919, which allowed him to travel to Europe for further study. At the time "he was the youngest person ever to win a Cuban government scholarship for the study of art in Europe." There he encountered Mannerism and social realism, which together with the work of Paul Gauguin would form the major influence on his work; during his sojourn he roomed with sculptor Juan José Sicre.In Europe he studied with notable artists of the century including Pablo Picasso, Salvador Dalí, and Joan Miro.

== Career ==
After completing college he returned to Cuba in 1926, and the following year-a time noted for its importance to modern art in Cuba-exhibited his works such as Mujeres en el Río, a Deco representation of an idyllic tropical scene based on monumental female nudes. He became part of the "Vanguardia", along with Victor Manuel, Amelia Peláez, and Wifredo Lam. He became an instructor at his alma mater, and executed public murals around Cuba. Gattorno developed his mature style in the early 1930s, concentrating on the depiction of Cuban peasants and their environment. The paintings that resulted from his maturity as an artist fluctuated between idyllic views of the Cuban countryside and criticism of Cuba's social conditions. In contrast to his radiant representation of nature and indications of a pastoral way of life, Gattorno depicted the guajiro as being emaciated and sad due to impoverished conditions. Given the representation of the land as radiant and bountiful, the most likely culprit for his peasants' look of dejection and impoverishment would have been the social system.

Gattorno's association with socialist leaning writers tend to confirm the interpretation of some of his guajiro figures as a social critique of life in the Cuban countryside of the 1930s. His major contribution to his generation's discourse of national ethos was an idealized vision of the land and a critical view of its most humble inhabitants, making both the primary symbols of Cuba. His first exhibition in the United States, in 1936, was sponsored by Ernest Hemingway and John Dos Passos. In 1940 he married Portuguese-American Isabella Cabral and moved to Greenwich Village; he visited Cuba again only in 1946, but spent the next thirty years in New York City. He remained in the United States for most of the rest of his career, in the process alienating many in the Cuban art community. He died in New Bedford, Massachusetts on April 5, 1980.

== Sources ==
- Alonso, Alejandro G., Contreras, Pedro, and Fagiuoli, Martino (2007). Havana Deco. New York: W.W. Norton and Company, ISBN 978-0-393-73232-0.
- Martínez, Juan (1994). Cuban Art and National Identity. Florida: University Press Florida. ISBN 978-0-813-01306-0.
- Poupeye, Veerle (1998). Caribbean Art. London; Thames and Hudson; ISBN 978-0-500-20306-4.
