= Fidelio Ponce de León =

Cuban painter (1895–1949)

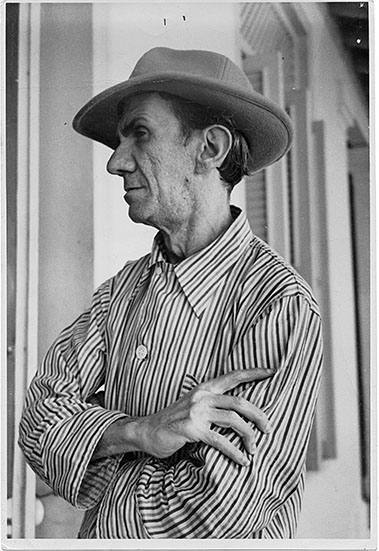
- Fidelio Ponce in 1947 (photo taken in Cuba by José Gómez-Sicre)
- Born: Alfredo Ramón Jesús de la Paz Fuentes Pons; 24 January 1895; Camagüey, Captaincy General of Cuba, Spanish Empire
- Died: 19 February 1949 (aged 54); Havana, Cuba
- Education: Escuela Nacional de Bellas Artes "San Alejandro"
- Known for: Painting
- Movement: "Vanguardia"

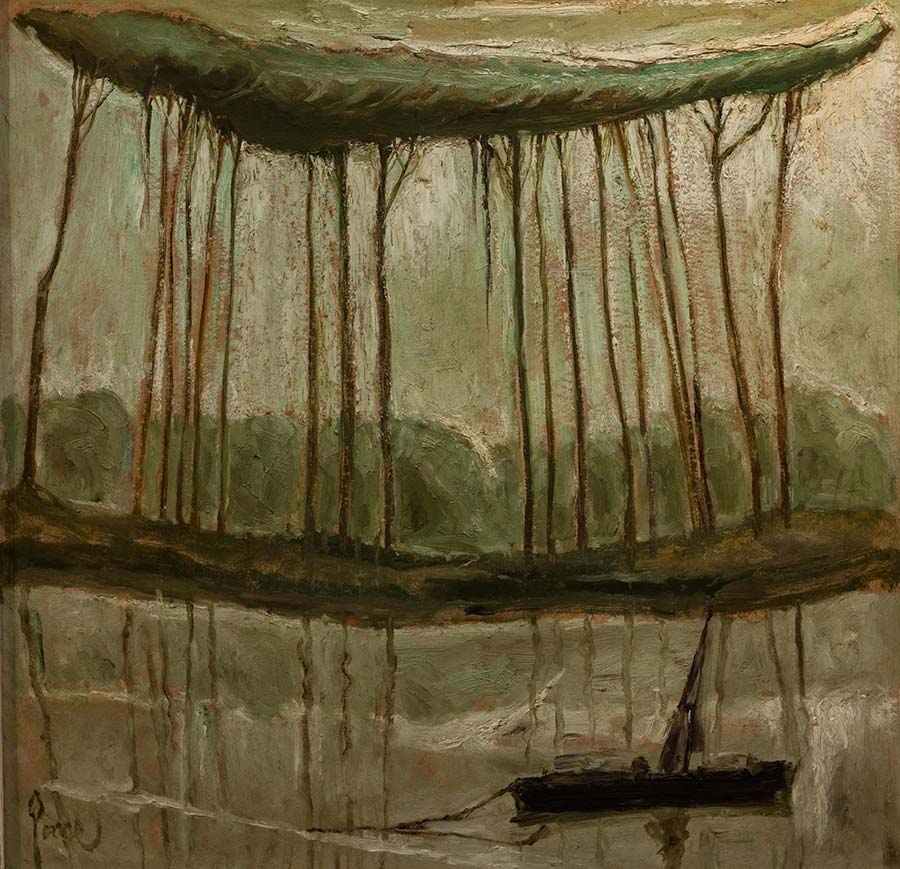
Landscape, National Museum of Fine Arts of Cuba

Fidelio Ponce de León (24 January 1895 - 19 February 1949) was the pseudonym of Alfredo Fuentes Pons, a Cuban painter. A native of Camagüey, he studied at the San Alejandro Academy in Havana from 1913 until 1918. Along with Antonio Gattorno, Victor Manuel, Amelia Peláez, and Wifredo Lam, he is considered part of the "Vanguardia" movement in Cuban art; however, unlike many of his contemporaries he never studied in Europe, and so had comparatively little contact with European modernism. Nevertheless, he listed among his influences Amedeo Modigliani, along with El Greco, Rembrandt, and Bartolomé Esteban Murillo. His paintings are also reminiscent of those of Edvard Munch. Later in life Ponce de León contracted tuberculosis; he died in Havana on 19 February 1949. The Museum of Modern Art is among the museums containing examples of his work.

== Style ==
Fidelio Ponce de León's style was one of the most singular styles and iconography of his generation. His paintings such as La Familia ("The Family") and Niños ("Children", 1938), reflect Cuban society of the 1930s, and offer a contrasting view to the idealized vision seen in the art of some of the other artists. They are tragic images about poverty, sickness, and alienation. Even when painting children in the midst of nature, as in Niños, a subject long associated with beauty and hope, his treatment of the landscape and the children's facial expressions suggest aridness and sadness. Ponce's desperate economic situation and unruly life matched the general socioeconomic situation of Cuba in the 1930s, and thus his paintings’ expressions of doom transcend the personal and may be said to symbolize the national mood of that time.

== Bibliography ==
- Juan Martínez. Cuban Art and National Identity. Florida: University Press Florida, 1994.
- Veerle Poupeye. Caribbean Art. London: Thames and Hudson, 1998.
- (in Spanish) Juan Sánchez. Fidelio Ponce. Ciudad de La Habana: Editorial Letras Cubanas, 1985.
