= Servando Cabrera Moreno =

Cuban painter (1923–1981)

- Born: Servando Cabrera Moreno; May 28, 1923; Havana, Cuba
- Died: September 30, 1981 (aged 58)
- Education: Academia Nacional de Bellas Artes San Alejandro; Art Students League of New York; Académie de la Grande Chaumière
- Occupation: Painter
- Known for: Painting
- Movement: Vanguardia

Servando Cabrera Moreno (1923–1981) was a Cuban painter. A supporter of the Cuban Revolution, he created many paintings that depict the Cuban peasantry. Stylistically, his paintings are rooted in the tradition of vanguardia, and are especially indebted to the work of Carlos Enríquez Gómez.

== Education and career ==
Cabrera Moreno was born in Havana on 28 May 1923. He graduated from the San Alejandro Academy in 1942, and pursued further studies at the Art Students League of New York and at the Académie de la Grande Chaumière in Paris. His first solo exhibition was held at the Lyceum in Havana in 1943, and he later participated in international biennials in Venice, Mexico City, and the São Paulo biennials. He received a gold medal at the Pan American Exhibition in Tampa, and a silver medal at the International Joan Miró Drawing Contest in Barcelona.
