= Fred Martinez =

Belizean politician and diplomat (1953–2014)

Alfredo "Fred" Martinez (September 9, 1953 – July 9, 2014) was a Belizean politician and diplomat. A former member of the Senate of Belize (1984-1989, 1997-1998) and Mayor of Orange Walk Town (1985-1988, 1991-1992), Martinez held numerous diplomatic posts during his career. Martinez was Belize's chief negotiator in the talks with Guatemala aimed at resolving the countries' longtime territorial and border dispute. Martinez's first diplomatic posting was as Ambassador to neighboring Mexico from 1993 until 1997. He was appointed Ambassador to Guatemala in 2003, a position he held up to his death in 2014. In addition to his ambassadorship to Guatemala from 2003 to 2014, Martinez was concurrently accredited as Belize's non-resident ambassador to Costa Rica, Honduras, Nicaragua and Panama.

Martinez was appointed to the Senate of Belize and Leader of Government Business from 1984 to 1989. He was briefly reappointed to the Senate from 1997 to 1998. (Members of the Senate are appointed by the Governor General of Belize). He was also elected Mayor of Orange Walk Town from 1985 to 1988 and again from 1991 to 1992. Martinez served as the chairman of the United Democratic Party (UDP), one of the country's two major political parties, from 1990 until 1993.
