= Roberto Estopiñán =

Cuban sculptor (1921–2015)

Roberto Estopiñán (1921–2015) was a Cuban American sculptor known for his sculptures of the human form, including political prisoners. Born in Camaguey, Cuba, he lived in the United States for over fifty years. His works are held by major institutions such as the Museum of Modern Art and the Smithsonian Museum of American Art.
