= Roberto Fabelo =

Cuban painter, sculptor and illustrator

- Born: José Roberto Fabelo Pérez; January 28, 1950 (age 76); Cuba
- Education: National School of Art (ENA); Higher Institute of Art (ISA)
- Known for: Painting, sculpture, illustration
- Awards: Medal of National Culture; Alejo Carpentier Medal; UNESCO Prize for the Promotion of the Fine Arts

José Roberto Fabelo Pérez (born January 28, 1950) is a Cuban painter, sculptor, and illustrator.

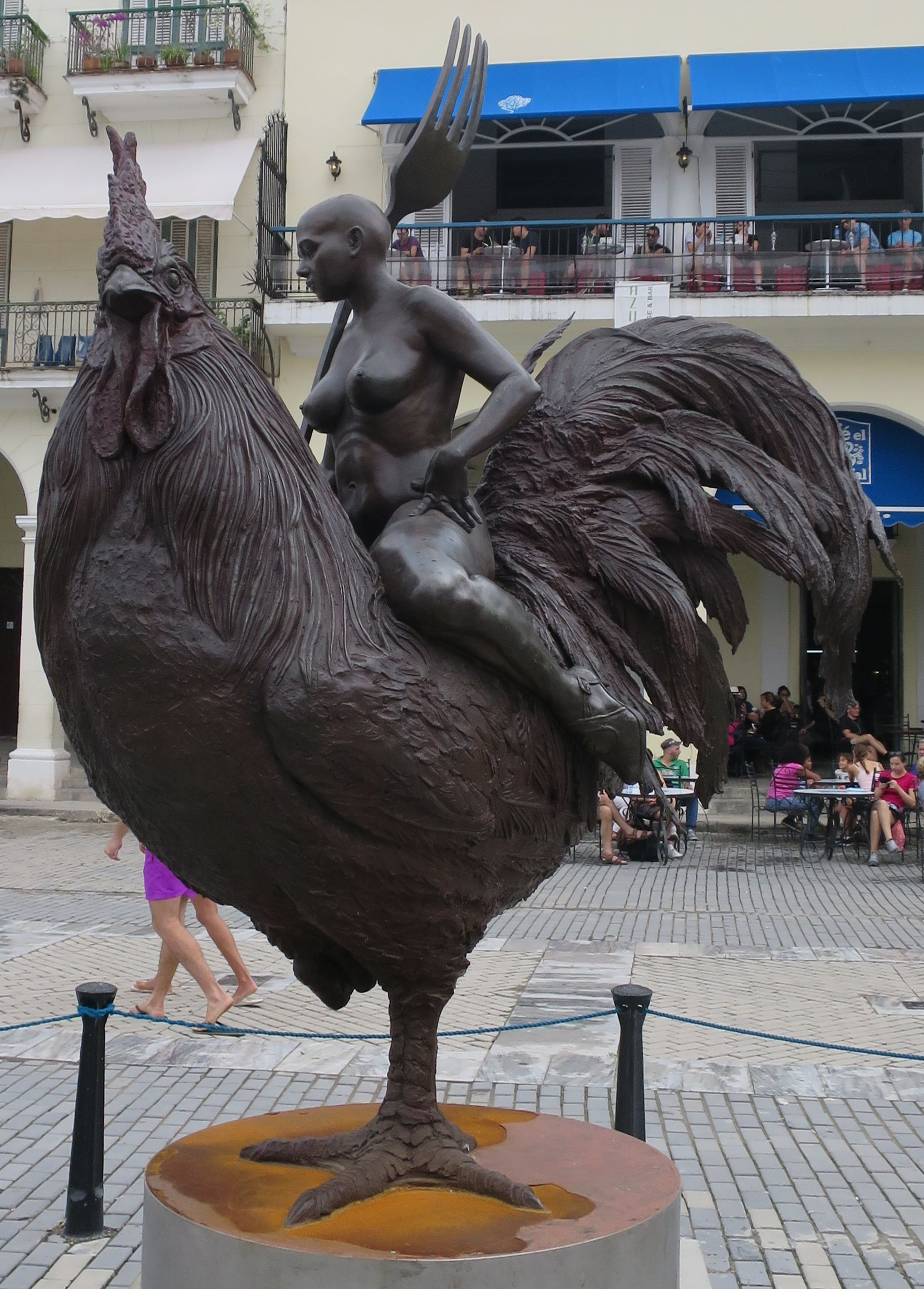
Viaje Fantástico, sculpture by Roberto Fabelo, 2012, Plaza Vieja, Havana

Fabelo's art is characterized by bizarre and dreamlike images that combine elements of reality and fantasy. He pays meticulous attention to detail and uses a symbolic interpretation in his works Using vibrant colors and intricate compositions in his paintings, drawings, and sculptures, he often depicts fantastical creatures, anthropomorphic animals, and human figures.

Because of his rich symbolism and allegorical storytelling, Fabelo is often compared to Goya. The artist is considered by some to be the Honoré Daumier of contemporary Cuban art, whose works have references to Dante's "Divine Comedy", the magical realism of Gabriel García Márquez, Hieronymus Bosch, the skills of the Dutch and Flemish masters and Rembrandt.

Identity, the human condition and the relationship between people and nature are the main themes of his complex representational art.

== Life ==
Roberto Fabelo spent his childhood in his hometown. The passion for drawing – or "Graphomania" as he calls it – began early at a young age, creating his illustrations with pencil, charcoal, ink or any other medium.

After his primary school education, he received academic training at the National School of Art (ENA) and at the Higher Institute of Art (ISA) between 1967 and 1972. He completed his degree there in 1981, which covered practically all forms of expression in the visual arts, and worked there as a professor for several years.

In the 1980s he achieved his first notable visibility in the art scene, giving lectures as a member of the Union of Writers and Artists of Cuba (UNEAC) and the International Union of Visual Artists. (Asociación Internacional de Artes Plásticas – AIAP).

== Awards ==
The Cuban state awarded him the Medal of National Culture and the Alejo-Carpentier Medal for his outstanding artistic career.

In addition to a variety of other Cuban awards, he was awarded the UNESCO Prize for the Promotion of the Fine Arts in Paris, France in 1996, as well as the New Delhi Triennial Prize for Contemporary Art in 1978 and the Armando Reverón International Drawing Prize at the I Havana Biennale in 1984.

Other international awards include: La Rosa Blanca Award (1995 and 1998); the first prize at the Ibero-American Watercolor Biennial in Viña del Mar, Chile (1996); the first prize at the 11th International Drawing Biennale in Cleveland, Great Britain (1993), the IX. Drawing exhibition in Rijeka, Yugoslavia (1984). Purchase Prize III Triennale for Contemporary Art in New Delhi, India (1984) and the Drawing Prize at Intergraphik 1984, Berlin, (GDR). Since 2002, his self-portrait has been part of the permanent collection of the Galleria Degli Uffizi in Florence, Italy.

== Exhibitions ==
In addition to a large number of Cuban exhibitions, Roberto Fabelo's works have been shown in major collections in Spain, Italy, Chile, France, Denmark, Sweden, Germany, Panama, Mexico, Venezuela, England, the United States and China, among others.Permanent exhibitions can be seen in the Pérez Art Museum Miami (PAMM) and in the Museo Nacional de Bellas Artes in Havana as well as in the Cuban embassy in Mexico.

== Special events and work ==
Roberto Fabelo illustrated an edition of Gabriel García Márquez's novel "Cien años de soledad" from 2007.

On May 8, 2017, an exhibition was opened in the Palace of the Vatican Chancellery Secretariat of State (Holy See).

In 2018, Roberto Fabelo took part in the exhibition "Artes de Cuba" at the Kennedy Center in Washington. The exhibition included several presentations, including the debut presentation of Historia permanente (Permanent History), a large-scale installation by Roberto Fabelo.

In March and April 2023, another exhibition "Sobrevivientes (Survivors)" by Roberto Fabelo took place at the Kennedy Center. The exhibition presented, among other things, a herd of life-sized rhinos, one of which was symbolically decorated with a ribbon as a gift from nature.

On February 15, 2023, an art exhibition was opened in Madrid by the Fundación Ibercaja entitled MUNDOS: GOYA Y FABELO, who drew parallels to the famous Spanish painter Francisco de Goya. There was also a bilingual Illustrated book published in large format.

At the same time, Fabelo showed “Sobrevivientes” ( Survivors), a collection of sculptures of giant cockroaches with human faces. With this he paid his tribute to Franz Kafka's The Metamorphosis.

In Zaragossa, an exhibition took place on August 14, 2023, at the Plaza del Pilar, which showed life-size sculptures of rhinos in different colors, as part of Fabelo's series "Sobrevivientes".

== Auctions ==
His works are auctioned at various auction houses such as Christie's, Sotheby's, Phillips de Pury & Company and Bonhams; Christie's alone with 71 pieces. On October 1, 2021, a triptych entitled “The Speech of the Flies” achieved a sales price of $525,000.
