= Eduardo Abela =

Cuban painter and comic artist

- Abela in 1964
- Born: Eduardo Abela Villareal; July 3, 1889; San Antonio de los Baños, Cuba
- Died: November 9, 1965 (aged 76); Havana, Cuba
- Education: Academia Nacional de Bellas Artes San Alejandro
- Known for: Painting, political cartoons
- Notable work: Los Guajiros (1938), El Bobo
- Movement: Vanguardia, Modernism

Eduardo Abela (1889–1965) was a Cuban painter and comics artist. Born in San Antonio de los Baños, he studied at the San Alejandro Academy of Fine Arts, graduating in 1921. For the next decade he lived abroad, first in Spain and then in France. In Paris he became acquainted with numerous Cuban intellectuals; among them was Alejo Carpentier, who encouraged him to develop his talent to depict native Cuban themes. Encounters with the work of Jules Pascin and Marc Chagall further shaped his style. Upon his return to Cuba, Abela created the character of "El Bobo" ("The Fool") as a protest against the Machado government. This he drew for El Diario de la Marina from 1930 until 1934. Abela's criollo character played the fool to satirize the difficult social and political situation in Cuba under Machado. In the second half of the 1930s Abela returned to painting, employing a naturalistic style influenced by early Renaissance painting and the Mexican mural movement. At this time he focused on an idealized view of the Cuban peasant and the countryside, as seen in his most renowned painting, Los Guajiros (1938), in which the Classical sobriety and order is the result of his contact with Italian medieval and Renaissance art. He also continued to paint, serving later in his career as a cultural attaché to Mexico and Guatemala, and in 1937 operating the short-lived Free Studio of Painting and Sculpture. Abela died in 1965.
