= Cundo Bermúdez =

Cuban artist (1914–2008)

- Born: Secundino Bermúdez y Delgado; September 3, 1914; Havana, Cuba
- Died: October 30, 2008 (aged 94); Westchester, Florida, United States
- Education: Academia Nacional de Bellas Artes San Alejandro; University of Havana; Academy of San Carlos
- Known for: Painting
- Movement: Vanguardia, Modernism

Secundino Bermúdez y Delgado or simply Cundo Bermúdez (September 3, 1914 – October 30, 2008), was a Cuban painter.

== Biography ==
Born in Havana, Cuba, he died of a heart attack in his Westchester home on October 30, 2008.

In 1926, Bermudez was admitted at the 'Institute of Havana,' and in 1930 enrolled at the renowned Academia Nacional de Bellas Artes San Alejandro, where he studied painting for two years. In 1934, he entered the University of Havana to study law and social sciences. He graduated in 1941. Later, he traveled to Mexico and studied at the Academy of San Carlos. In 1949 he founded the Asociación de Pintores y Escultores de Cuba (APEC).

== Individual exhibitions ==
- 1942 – "Cundo Bermúdez. Gouaches y Acuarelas", Lyceum, Havana, Cuba
- 1946 – Palace of Fine Arts in Mexico
- 1946 – Palacio de Bellas Artes de Buenos Aires, Buenos Aires, Argentina
- 1957 – "Exposición de Cundo Bermúdez", Instituto de Arte Contemporáneo, Lima, Peru
- 1974 – "Cundo Bermúdez Painting/Alfredo Lozano Sculptures", Bacardí Art Gallery, Miami, Florida
- 1979 – Museum of Modern Art of Latin America, Washington, D.C.

== Collective exhibitions ==
He was part of many collectives exhibitions such as:

- 1938 – "National Exhibition of Paintings and Sculptures" at the Castillo de la Fuerza, Havana, Cuba
- 1940 – "Three hundred Years of Art in Cuba", University of Havana, Havana, Cuba
- 1941 – "Cuban Contemporary Art Exhibition", Lyceum, Havana, Cuba
- 1942 – "Some Contemporary Painters", Lyceum, Havana, Cuba
- 1943 – "An Exhibition of Painting and Sculpture Modern Cuban", José Gómez-Sicre Institution, Havana, Cuba
- 1944 – Cuban Painting Exhibition at the Museum of Modern Art (MOMA), New York City
- 1950 – "Pinturas". Cundo Bermúdez, Amelia Peláez and Martínez Pedro. Lyceum, Havana, Cuba
- 1951 – "I São Paulo Art Biennial", São Paulo, Brazil
- 1952 – "XXVI Biennale di Venezia", Venice, Italy
- 1953 – "II Bienal de San Juan del Grabado Latinoamericano", Instituto de Cultura Puertorriqueña, San Juan, Puerto Rico
- 1994 – "Cuban Artists: Expressions in Graphics", Jadite Galleries, New York City

== Awards ==
- Prize of Acquisition of the Gulf Caribbean Art Exhibition, Museum of Fine Arts of Houston, Houston, Texas
- 1972 – Hororable Mention, "Segunda Bienal de San Juan del Grabado Latinoamericano", Instituto de Cultura Puertorriqueña, San Juan, Puerto Rico
- 1973 – "Homenaje a Picasso", Organización de Estados Americanos (OEA), Washington, D.C.
- 1973 – 'Cintas Foundation Fellowship', New York City.

== Collections ==
- Lowe Art Museum, University of Miami, Coral Gables, Florida
- Kendall Art Center, Miami, Florida
- Museo Nacional de Bellas Artes de La Habana, Havana, Cuba
- Hotel Riviera, Havana, Cuba
