= Cuba Nostalgia =

Annual festival in Miami, Florida, US

Cuba Nostalgia is an annual three-day festival in Little Havana, a neighbourhood in Miami, Florida, where Cuban-Americans celebrate Cuba as it was before Castro. The festival has also hosted a database to reconnect those who were trafficked from Cuba as children during Operation Peter Pan.
