= Víctor Manuel García Valdés =

Cuban painter (1897–1969)

Víctor Manuel
- Víctor Manuel García Valdés, Havana, Cuba, 1933. Photo by Walker Evans. © Walker Evans Archive, The Metropolitan Museum of Art
- Born: Víctor Manuel García Valdés; October 31, 1897; Havana, Cuba
- Died: February 1, 1969 (aged 71); Havana, Cuba
- Education: Academia Nacional de Bellas Artes San Alejandro
- Known for: Painting, lithography
- Movement: Vanguardia, Modernism

Víctor Manuel García Valdés (October 31, 1897 – February 1, 1969) was a Cuban painter. He was an early member of the "Vanguardia" movement of artists who, beginning in the 1920s, combined European concepts of Modern art with native Primitivism to create a distinctly Cuban aesthetic.

== Life and career ==
Born in Havana, at age six Victor Manuel already showed a precocious aptitude for drawing. At age 12 he enrolled in the Escuela Nacional de Bellas Artes "San Alejandro", the most prominent art school in Cuba, where he studied under the famous painter Leopoldo Romañach. By his mid-teens he was acting as an unofficial professor of elementary drawing.

By age 19 Manuel's talent started becoming evident. Nevertheless, he didn't have his first personal exhibition until 1924, at the Gallery of San Rafael in Havana, when he was 26 years old. In 1925 he traveled to France for a year of study in Paris. There, he was exposed to the various Modernist trends of the city's bustling art scene; he found particular resonance in Paul Gauguin's Primitivist style of painting. It was in Montparnasse that a group of French artists advised him to sign his paintings only as "Víctor Manuel" (until then, he had used his entire name and surname).

La Gitana Tropical, 1929, Victor Manuel.

After returning to Cuba, Manuel's work was featured in both a solo show (Feb. 1927) and in the Exhibition of New Work group show (May 1927) at the Painters and Sculptors Association of Havana. Sponsored by Revista de Avance, a magazine which was the main voice of the Vanguardia artists, these shows are considered to be important starting points of the Cuban modern painting era. In 1929, following another period of study and travel in Europe, Manuel created his most famous painting, La Gitana Tropical (The Tropical Gipsy), popularly known as "La Gioconda Americana" ("The American Mona Lisa"), which is in the Museo Nacional de Bellas Artes in Havana. It is considered by critics to be one of the defining pieces of Cuban Avant-garde art.

In 1935, Víctor Manuel began to reap awards for his work, receiving prizes in the first two exhibitions of painting and sculpture, held in 1935 and 1938 respectively, at Havana's Lyceum. He was given solo exhibitions at the University of Havana (1945), the Association of Reporters (1951), and the Lex Gallery (1959), and was the subject of a career retrospective at the national galleries in 1959. In 1964, he began a new stage in which he expressed himself through lithography, holding experimental graphic workshops in Havana's Plaza de la Catedral. He also continued exhibiting his works abroad.

He died in 1969, in Havana.

== Style ==
Víctor Manuel's style was not monolithic, but it evolved greatly during his lifetime. His early paintings show a tendency to mix European styles with an earthy primitivism, such as La Gitana Tropical (1929). In the 1940s and 1950s he adopted the more stylized look that became distinctive of his work. During the last years of his life, his style became almost abstract, with his portraits suggesting cubism.

He was very inconsistent in signing his work, ranging from a simple "VICTOR MANUEL" in all capitalized letters, to fluid and complicated script, to not signing his paintings at all. He even used a pseudonym in a period of his life .

His subjects were the constant point of his work. He was eminently a portraitist of female faces, as well as painter of landscapes, both rural and urban.
