= Amelia Peláez =

Cuban painter

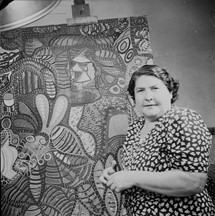
- Born: Amelia Peláez del Casal; 5 January 1896; Yaguajay, Cuba
- Died: 8 April 1968 (aged 72); Havana, Cuba
- Education: Academia Nacional de Bellas Artes San Alejandro; Art Students League of New York; École nationale supérieure des Beaux-Arts; Académie de la Grande Chaumière; École du Louvre
- Known for: Painting, ceramics, murals

Amelia Peláez del Casal (5 January 1896 – 8 April 1968) was an important Cuban painter of the Avant-garde generation.

== Biography ==
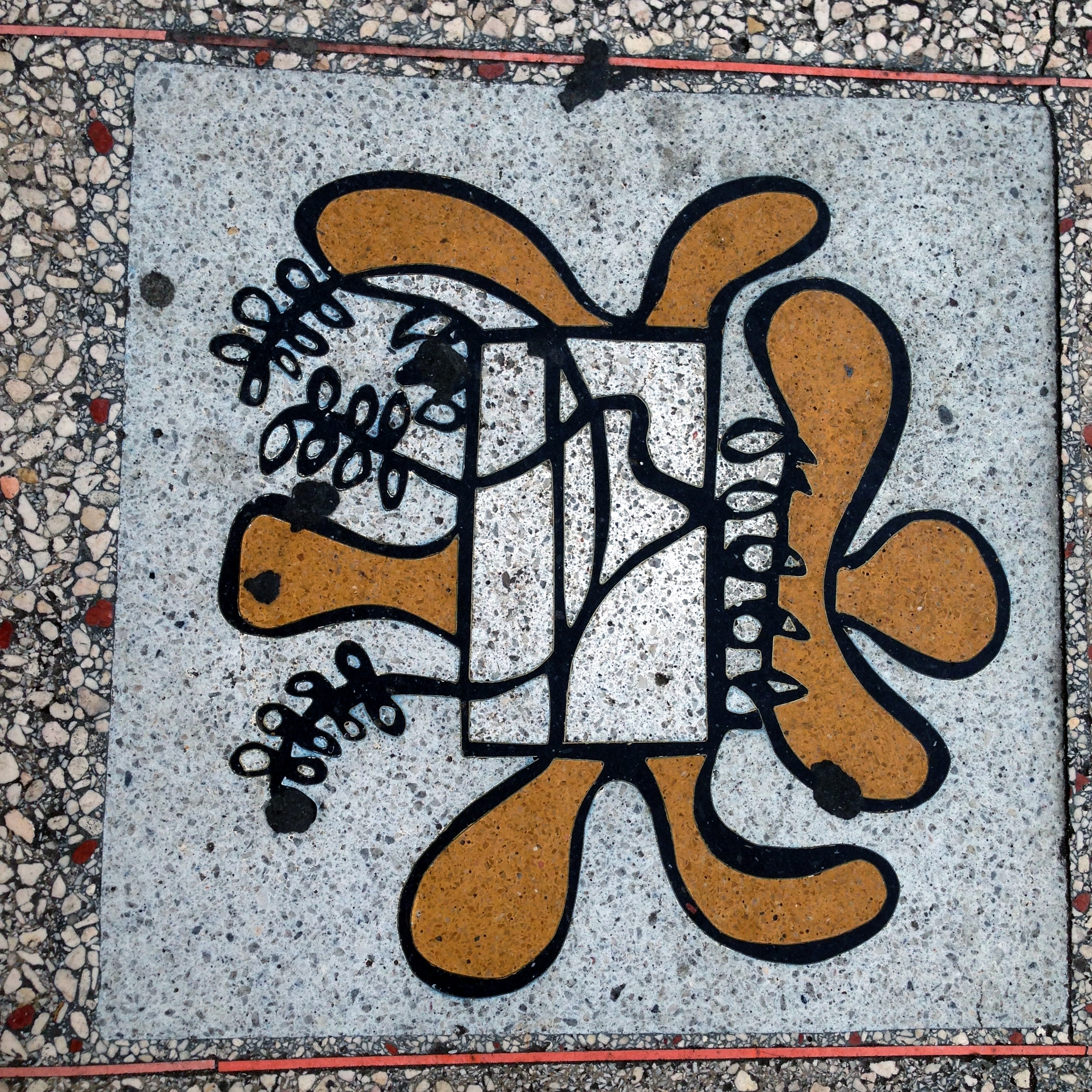
Salón de Mayo, 1967. Sidewalk insert in front of Radiocentro CMQ Building by Amelia Peláez.

Amelia Peláez was born on 5 January 1896 in Yaguajay, Cuba, in the former Cuban province of Las Villas (now Sancti Spíritus Province). She was the fifth born of eleven siblings in a family that was part of the Cuban-Creole middle class. Her father was a doctor, Manuel Pelaez y Laredo, and her mother, Maria del Carmen del Casal y Lastra, stayed at home with her children. Amelia's uncle was Julian del Casal, who was a poet and included her family in Cuba's intellectual circles.

In 1917, her family moved to Havana, to the La Víbora district, and this gave her the opportunity to enter the Escuela Nacional de Bellas Artes "San Alejandro" at the rather late age of 20 years (students at this academy usually start at 12–13 years of age). She was among Leopoldo Romañach's favorite students. In 1924, she graduated from San Alejandro and exhibited her paintings for the first time, along with another Cuban female painter, María Pepa Lamarque, at the Association of Painters and Sculptors in Havana. Receiving a small government grant, she travelled to New York City in the summer of 1924 and began six months of study at the Art Students' League. In 1927, after being awarded a larger grant, she began studying in France, while paying short visits to Spain, Italy, and other countries.

== Student life in Paris ==
Pelaez moved to Paris, accompanied by Cuban writer Lydia Cabrera, after she received a grant from the government in order to pursue art. Both took painting and art history courses at École Nationale Supérieure des Beaux-Arts. She also took drawing and art history courses at the Académie de la Grande Chaumière and the École du Louvre. In 1931, Pelaez enrolled, along with Cabrera, in Fernand Léger's Academie Contemporaine. She then began studying with Russian painter Alexandra Exter, whose friendship and classes in color theory and design were an important influence.

Galerie Zak hosted a solo exhibition of her paintings in 1933, where she exhibited thirty-eight works. In that same year, she participated in the eleventh Salon des Tuileries and “was also included in an exhibition of illustrated manuscripts by the calligrapher Guido at the Galerie Myrbor”, in which she illustrated Sept Poemes of Leon Paul Fargue. In her years in Paris, her work was highly praised by French critics.

== Life in Havana ==
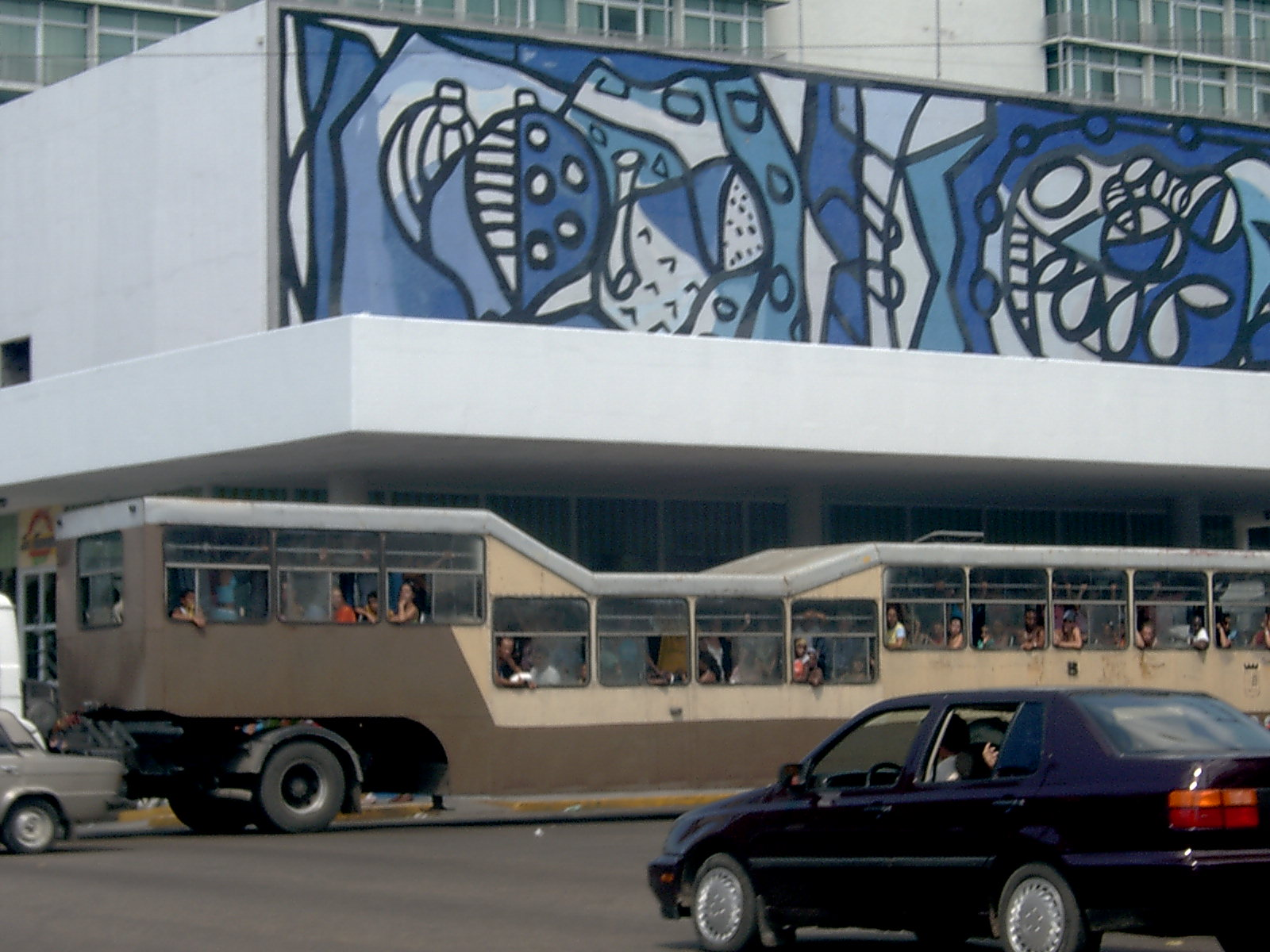
Mural by Amelia Peláez for the Habana Hilton

In 1934, following a showing at the Salon des Independants, Pelaez returned to live in her mother’s colonial-style house in Cuba. The Cuba Pelaez returned to was in a state of economic uncertainty and political unrest. Beginning in the late 1920s, Cuba was searching for a new art that would reflect the national identity. In response, Pelaez departed from earlier vanguard strategies and turned to new approaches that involved depictions of Afro-Cuban and guajiro (peasant) subjects, while representing them in the adoption of European modernism. According to Ingrid Williams Elliot, Pelaez’s vibrant colors as well as thick lines are derived from Spanish-colonial architecture “integrating domestic objects with architectural decorations”. Peláez uses "Baroque ornamentation in her use of domestic colonial interiors to engage and merge multiple histories and assorted styles -- past and present -- to arrive at a contemporary Cuban idiom.”

In 1935, Pelaez had a solo exhibition at a women’s club in Havana called the Lyceum, which helped gain exposure of her new modernist Cuban style.

During this time, in the mid-thirties, Peláez was experimenting with "patterns, shapes and geometric relationships of tablecloths and fruit dishes, laying the groundwork for the geometric constructions and rhythmic patterns that have been associated with her architectural ornamentation in her work in the forties”, it also shows her awareness of Cubism. Her signature still life paintings were praised for the use of native fruits and flora referencing her Cuban roots.

In 1935-1936, Pelaez focused much of her paintings and drawings to the use of ink and pencil. The treatment of these drawings differs than her previous oil works, by distorting and exaggerating the figure with "sinuous line and light shading" that reference Cubism and European Modernism.

Peláez received a prize in the National Exposition of Painters and Sculptors in 1938, and collaborated on several art magazines in Cuba, such as Orígenes, Nadie Parecía, and Espuela de Plata. In 1950 she opened a workshop at San Antonio de los Baños, a small city near Havana, where she dedicated herself, until 1962, to her favourite pastime of pottery. She sent her paintings to the São Paulo Art Biennial in 1951 and 1957, and participated in 1952's Venice Biennale. In 1958 she was a guest of honour and jury member at the First Inter-American Biennial of Painting and Printmaking in Mexico City, although she pulled out of the raucous and controversial jury discussions based on what she reported to be “an openly Communist bias in the decisions.” Aside from painting and pottery, she dedicated time to murals, located mainly at different schools in Cuba. Her most important works of this type are a ceramic mural at the Tribunal de Cuentas in Havana (1953) and the facade of the Habana Hilton hotel (1957). She had a hard time selling her paintings as a living artists—she and her paintings, later named Amelias, achieved fame much later in life.

Peláez died in Havana in 1968.

== Estrada Palma 261 ==
Amelia lived in her mother's house, which was a mix between a neoclassical design and a more traditional Cuban Creole architectural style house, for the rest of her years after her return to Havana, Cuba. Her house was a main source of inspiration after returning to a reclusive domestic lifestyle. The house was built in 1912, filled with colonial furniture of the baroque style. The house contained marble, crystal, wood, and ceramics in its interior. Amelia would also hang her paintings as decor.

== Exhibitions ==
- 1924 Amelia Pelaez y Maria Pepa Lamarque, Asociacion de Pintores y Escultores, Havana
- 1933 Amelia Pelaez Del Casal, Galerie Zak, Paris
- 1935 Amelia Pelaez Del Casal, Lyceum, Havana
- 1941 Amelia Pelaez, Norte Gallery, New York
- 1943 Amelia Pelaez: Retrospectiva, Institucion Hispano—Cubana de Cultura, Havana
- 1956 Amelia Pelaez, Nuestro Tiempo, Havana
- 1957 Amelia Pelaez, Lyceum, Havana
- 1959 Pintura de Amelia Pelaez, Instituto Municipal de Cultura, Marianao, Havana
- 1960 Amelia Pelaez, Pintura y Ceramida 1920–1960 Lyceum Havana, Cuba
- 1964 Oleos y Temperas de Amelia Pelaez, Galeria de la Habana, Havana
- 1967 Dibujos de Amelia Pelaez, Museo de Arte Moderno Bogota. Amelia Pelaez; Goaches y Ceramicas, Lyceum, Havana
- 1968 Amelia Pelaez: Exposicion Retrospectiva, Museo Nacional, Havana
- 1977 Amelia Pelaez, Metropolitan Museum & Art Center, Miami
- 1979 La Gran Pintora Cubana Amelia Pelaez, Museo de Arte Moderno, Mexico City
- 1980 Amelia Pelaez, Museo de Arte Moderno, Bogota
- 1987 Amelia Pelaez, Nineteenth Sao Paulo Biennial, Sao Paulo
- 1988 Amelia Pelaez; A Retrospective, Cuban Museum of Arts & Culture, Miami
- 2013 Amelia Peláez: The Craft of Modernity, Pérez Art Museum Miami

== Collections (selection) ==
The works of Peláez are held in the Museo Nacional de Bellas Artes de La Habana, the Pérez Art Museum Miami, Moderna Museet in Stockholm, and the Museum of Modern Art, New York.
