= Antonio Permuy =

American art patron, curator, and collector

- Born: New York City, New York
- Education: Belen Jesuit Preparatory School; University of South Florida
- Occupations: Art patron; curator; art collector; writer
- Years active: c. 2016 – Present
- Family: Marta Permuy (grandmother); Jesús Permuy (grandfather)

Antonio Permuy is an American art patron, curator, art collector, writer, philanthropist, and advocate. He has curated notable exhibitions of Cuban, American, and European art and his writings have been published in the United States and Europe. Permuy has donated works into the permanent collections of museums as well as cultural and educational institutions including the Tampa Museum of Art, Frost Art Museum, Nova Southeastern University, and Hillsborough College.

== Background ==
Antonio Permuy was born in the Lenox Hill neighborhood of New York City and raised in Coral Gables, Florida. He is a grandson of art patron Marta Permuy and international human rights advocate Jesús Permuy. Permuy graduated from Belen Jesuit Preparatory School and the University of South Florida. While a university student, he founded the University of South Florida St. Petersburg campus’ first student art club, which became his first vehicle for organizing and curating art events and expanding the presence of the arts.

Permuy has remained active in the arts, as well as in other fields. In 2017 he began leading the Permuy Architecture Communications Department, where he oversaw the firm's expanded media presence with coverage for its projects on several major outlets including Architectural Digest, Dezeen, The Miami Herald, and The Real Deal, as well as securing design recognitions such as the Chicago Athenaeum's 2020 American Architecture Award. Permuy also led efforts to sponsor and organize community events through the firm with the office of then-Congresswoman Ileana Ros-Lehtinen as well as the Miami-Dade County Commission to honor the public service of firm board member Jesús Permuy. He also currently serves as co-founder of BlackOUT Art LLC., as well as founder and president of legacy consulting firm Permuy Legacies LLC.

== Curatorial and writing career ==
As a curator, Permuy has curated art exhibitions in Miami, Tampa, St. Petersburg, Coral Gables, Gulfport, and Miami Beach. His exhibitions have centered on various themes including emerging artists, biology-inspired art, Florida art, and Cuban art. Permuy has exhibited several established as well as emerging American, Cuban, and European artists from the 20th and 21st centuries.

Beginning in 2018, he initiated and curated Permuy Architecture’s annual art exhibition series titled Art + Architecture during Miami Art Week as a homage to the history of Permuy Gallery. The exhibitions have featured the work of several established Cuban and local South Florida artists. The exhibition series is also notable for its media coverage and being attended by South Florida political and business leaders.

Permuy’s other notable exhibitions include Forbidden Fruit: The Art of Cuban Sexuality, the largest documented exhibition of Cuban erotic art. The exhibition opened during Miami Art Week of 2024 and was officially affiliated with Art Basel Miami Beach, garnering international visibility and media coverage. Forbidden Fruit featured 72 artists and 153 works, as well as three photographic works by American guest artist Mariette Pathy Allen that were taken during her visits to Cuba. The exhibition was also the first exhibition of Cuban art to be held in the World Erotic Art Museum (WEAM) ahead of its 20th anniversary. Forbidden Fruit also marked the final career exhibitions with the active involvement of Baruj Salinas and Margarita Cano, who had both died in 2024.

In 2024 Permuy co-curated Flourishing Dichotomies: Florida Art, Past & Present with Amanda Poss, an exhibition held in Tampa that spanned a century of Florida-themed art. Hosted by HCC Art Galleries, Flourishing Dichotomies was significant for its extensive loan from the Harn Museum of Art’s Vicker’s Collection, one of the largest existing collections of Florida themed art. Flourishing Dichotomies received printed, televised, radio and online coverage and included painted as well as photographic works. The exhibition was unveiled with a panel discussion featuring Permuy, Poss, and several of the featured contemporary artists held on September 5, 2024.

In 2025, Permuy co-curated the religious solo exhibition Sacred Pilgrimage: Gaudí and Galban with Tarin Mohajeri. Sacred Pilgrimage featured 25 original works by AGalban created in honor of the architecture of Antoní Gaudí, with most based primarily on the Basilica of the Sagrada Familia. The exhibition was notable for its published media coverage, spiritual origin story, as well as being AGalban’s first traveling exhibition. Sacred Pilgrimage exhibited in churches, as well as galleries and community spaces, to serve as a conceptual “pilgrimage” and is set to end in Barcelona, Spain to mark the 100th anniversary of Gaudí's death and the completion of the Sagrada Familia in 2026. It received a sponsorship grant from the Gobioff Foundation and had an education partnership with the American Institute of Architects Tampa Bay Center for Architecture and Design. Through its tour, the exhibition also spawned other events that supported its cultural and educational programming, including The Art of Architecture: A Panel Discussion. Held in The Portico Tampa on August 8th 2025, the architecture panel was co-organized by AIA Tampa Bay and moderated by Permuy.

Permuy has curated the work of several notable Cuban artists. They include leading members of the Cuban Vangaurdia generation such as Wifredo Lam, Victor Manuel, Amelia Peláez, René Portocarrero, Mario Carreño, Carlos Enriquez, and Mariano Rodríguez, as well as subsequent notable Cuban figures such as Servando Cabrera. He has also curated the work of prominent Cuban artists in exile such as Josignacio, Agustín Fernández, Roberto Estopiñán, Baruj Salinas, Rafael Soriano, José Mijares, Rafael Consuegra, Lourdes Gómez Franca, Dionisio Perkins, Juan González, Emilio Falero, Ramon Unzueta, Adriano Nicot, Miguel Fleitas, AGalban, Luis Marín, Pedro Hernandez, Ramón Alejandro, Miguel Rodez, Mario Torroella, Pablo and Margarita Cano, as well as living contemporary Cuban artists based in Cuba such as Manuel Mendive, Roberto Fabelo, and Oscar Alfonso.

Permuy has also curated the work of European artists including Mathias Alten and Lajos Jámbor, and American artists such as Virginia Berresford, Neith Nevelson, Florence Baran Wise, Jenny Carrey, and Florida Highwaymen member Johnny “Hook” Daniels. His exhibitions are also notable for having secured loans from prominent collections including the Harn Museum of Art, the Kendall Art Center, the Alfredo Martinez Collection, as well as several fine art galleries.

As a writer, Permuy has written published articles and analysis on Baruj Salinas, Miguel Jorge, Edel Alvarez Galban, Yamilet Sempé, Duncan McClellan and other artists. His work has been published in various publications including Art Business News, The Artisan Magazine, Arts Coast Magazine, Gables Living Magazine, Gables Insider, Biscayne Bay Tribune, Caplin News, as well as internationally on Brussels-based Contemporary Art Issue.

His research on South Florida arts and culture has contributed to the archives of the Miami-Dade Public Library System’s Vasari Project on the post-WWII art and culture of South Florida. Permuy also contributed research and writing to the American Museum of the Cuban Diaspora’s 2023 retrospective exhibition of Ramón Unzueta, an artist connected to his grandmother Marta’s later career.

== Patronage, advocacy, and recognition ==
As an art patron, Permuy has donated works from his personal art collection by several notable artists including Josignacio, Ramon Unzueta, Mario Torroella, Adriano Nicot, Miguel Fleitas, Edel Alvarez Galban, Pedro Hernandez, Neith Nevelson, Margarita Cano, and Ramón Alejandro.

He has donated artwork to several cultural and educational museums and institutions including the Tampa Museum of Art, Frost Art Museum, Museum of Fine Arts St. Petersburg, The Wilzig Museum Building, the Alvin Sherman Library, and Hillsborough College.

Many of his donations have also notable for being the respective artist’s first inclusion into a museum permanent collection, as well as for being made in memory of his grandmother, art patron and collector Marta Permuy. Some of the works were previously in Marta Permuy’s private collection. In October 2024 Permuy donated twelve works to the Alvin Sherman Library established the “Marta Permuy Legacy Collection” within the library’s permanent collection of art. The collection was unveiled in an exhibition on October 1 to coincide with Hispanic Heritage Month due to the number of works by Cuban artists.

Permuy’s December 2024 donation of 30 artworks to the Wilzig Museum Building marked the largest donation of art received by the museum outside of the Wilzig family. The museum released a statement announcing the donation stating “it is a gift to the residents of Miami who will now call the donated works of art their own, and will include them in their collective memory for generations.”

As a cultural writer, researcher, curator, and advocate, Permuy has publicly addressed and testified to government commissions and semi-judicial boards on the findings of his research in support of efforts to document and spotlight cultural history. He has also served other public roles including as an arts panelist, architecture panel moderator, and fine art competition judge.

His career has been covered on El Nuevo Herald, Market Watch, Morningstar, Diario Las Americas, SWO Magazine, The Malaysian Reserve, Eastern Progress, The Charleston Gazette, Creative Pinellas, Coral Gables News, The Longview New Journal, West Orlando News, CNHI News, Library Link, 83 Degrees Media, WMAS Art Talks, WMNF radio, and on television.

Permuy was featured on the cover of the December 2024 issue of South Florida Magazine (Vol. 8, No. 12).

In 2025, Permuy was featured on the Fall 2025 cover of Library Link. In December 2025 Permuy delivered the keynote address for the Alvin Sherman Library's Annual Recognition Breakfast discussing art patronage and safekeeping cultural histories.

In 2026, Permuy was inducted into the NSU Fellows Society, Nova Southeastern University's premier philanthropic recognition group, honoring individuals, corporations, and foundations that have made significant cumulative gifts to the institution.

== See also ==
- Marta Permuy
- Jesús Permuy
- Alvin Sherman Library
