= Oscar Alfonso =

Cuban artist (born 1956)

- Born: Oscar Alfonso Acosta; January 8, 1952; Havana, Cuba
- Education: Instituto Politécnico de Diseño Industrial (IPDI)
- Occupations: Visual artist, animator, film director
- Known for: Cuban contemporary painting, film animation
- Notable work: Instrumentos series
- Movement: Cuban and Caribbean Contemporary art

Oscar Alfonso Acosta (born January 8, 1952, Havana, Cuba), known artistically as Oscar Alfonso, is a Cuban painter, sculptor, draftsman, and multidisciplinary visual artist and former filmmaker. Known for a career spanning painting, animation, and sculpture, Alfonso has exhibited in major Cuban cultural institutions and has developed an international collector base across Europe and the Americas. His work is held in public institutional collections in the United States, including the Wilzig Museum in Miami Beach and the Nova Southeastern University (NSU) Alvin Sherman Library in Fort Lauderdale, Florida.

Alfonso gained national recognition in Cuba following exhibitions at the National Museum of Fine Arts in Havana and has participated in exhibitions alongside historically significant Cuban artists such as Wifredo Lam, René Portocarrero, Mario Carreño, Carlos Enríquez, Mariano Rodríguez, and Manuel Mendive. In 2024, he was featured in Forbidden Fruit, an Art Basel Miami Beach–affiliated exhibition recognized as the largest documented exhibition of Cuban erotic art.

== Early life and education ==
Alfonso was born January 8, 1952, in Havana, Cuba, into a family of artisans and creatives. His father, Claudio Alfonso, had a creative background as a draftsman and craftsman, while his mother, Leonela Acosta, worked professionally as a seamstress and also held strong drawing abilities. This environment fostered Alfonso's early interest in visual arts and manual craftsmanship. He attended public schools in Old Havana and Centro Habana, where he began participating in drawing competitions and artistic workshops. During his adolescence, he learned techniques such as papier-mâché and developed foundational skills in drawing and design. Alfonso later trained as an automotive mechanic and completed technical studies in informational illustration and design at the Instituto Politécnico de Diseño Industrial (IPDI). He is largely self-taught as an artist, developing his practice independently across multiple disciplines including painting, sculpture, and animation.

== Career ==
=== Early career and war experience ===
In the early 1970s, Alfonso worked as a teacher and administrator before becoming a photojournalist. He served as a war correspondent in Angola during Cuba's military involvement in Africa. In February 1978, he was seriously injured in combat and lost a leg. During his recovery, Alfonso turned to painting as a form of psychological rehabilitation while battling Post-Traumatic Stress Disorder. He produced a series of works depicting African figures, which were then exhibited at the National Museum of Fine Arts in 1980. This exhibition marked his first formal entry into Cuba's national art scene.

=== Film and animation work ===
Beginning in the 1980s, Alfonso worked in the animation and film industry within Cuba's military film studios. He contributed as a line and background artist, typographic designer, and animator for films, television programs, and documentaries. He directed and produced animated works, including the short film Historia de amor, and collaborated on the stop-motion film La deuda, which was presented at the Leipzig International Film Festival for Documentary and Animated Film in Germany. His work in audiovisual media included design and animation for Cuban television, documentaries, and advertising.

=== Visual arts career ===
By the late 1990s, Alfonso transitioned fully to painting and independent artistic production. In 2001, he began working with Galería Pintores de la Plaza, part of the Fondo Cubano de Bienes Culturales in Havana's historic district. This affiliation integrated him into one of the principal state-supported art distribution networks in Cuba. He also became associated with the Festival de las Artes community complex on Havana's Paseo del Prado, working alongside a collective of artists and artisans under the direction of noted Cuban filmmaker, designer, and comic artist Cecilio Avilés (1944–2022). Alfonso's work spans a wide range of styles—from academic realism to abstraction—and frequently incorporates symbolic, surrealist, and figurative elements. His series Instrumentos (Instruments), for example, explores the intersection of utilitarian objects and metaphysical symbolism through anthropomorphic forms. Works by Alfonso have also been offered at auction outside of Cuba, including in the United States.

== Exhibitions ==
Alfonso has participated in numerous exhibitions internationally in Cuba and the United States. His work has been exhibited is several of Cuba's leading venues including the National Museum of Fine Arts (Havana, 1980), Casa de África Museum (Havana, 1988), Casa de la Obra Pía Museum (Havana, 1998), Museum of the Revolution (Havana, 2000), Plaza Hotel (Havana, 1999), as well as various other cultural venues across Havana, including Teatro Avenida (2007) and Tarará Cultural Spaces (2007). His work has also been shown internationally through private galleries and exhibitions.

In 2024, Alfonso was featured in Forbidden Fruit: The Art of Cuban Sexuality, an Art Basel Miami Beach–affiliated exhibition showcasing historic and contemporary Cuban artists spanning 90 years, becoming the largest documented exhibition of Cuban erotic art. Alfonso's inclusion was also notable for being among the few living Contemporary artists still based in Cuba, including Manuel Mendive and Roberto Fabelo. Alfonso's work has also been featured alongside other notable Cuban artists including Wifredo Lam, Rene Portocarrero, Mario Carreno, Carlos Enriquez, Mariano Rodriguez, José María Mijares, Rafael Soriano, Agustin Fernandez, Josignacio, Ramon Alejandro, Lourdes Gomez Franca, Baruj Salinas, and Miguel Fleitas. Following the exhibition, Alfonso's featured works were acquired by the World Erotic Art Museum and are now included in its permanent collection.

== Collections and recognition ==
Alfonso's work is included in several public and private collections, including the Wilzig Museum in Miami Beach and the Nova Southeastern University Alvin Sherman Library. The NSU Alvin Sherman is noted for being one of the largest libraries in the Southeast United States while its permanent collection places his work in dialogue with holdings by internationally recognized artists such as Salvador Dalí, Dale Chihuly, and Peter Max. In addition to his public institutional collections, Alfonso's work is also held in private collections in France, Italy, Spain, Chile, Cuba, and the United States.

== Awards and honors ==
Alfonso has received multiple awards and recognitions throughout his career, including:

- Second Prize, ACLIFIM Fine Arts Contest (2000)
- Third Prize, ACLIFIM Fine Arts Contest (1999)
- Special Recognition, Cuban Fund of Cultural Goods (1991)
- Recognition, Casa de la Cultura (2000)
- Recognition from the Ethiopian Embassy for audiovisual contributions (1986)
- Awards and mentions for animation and audiovisual production in Cuban national competitions

== Artistic style and themes ==
Alfonso's work is characterized by its stylistic diversity and thematic flexibility. Rather than adhering to a single movement, his practice moves fluidly between figurative, abstract, and symbolic modes.

Recurring themes in his work include Human resilience and transformation, spiritual and metaphysical symbolism, the relationship between material necessity and inner life, Afro-Caribbean cultural references, and social contemporary Cuban life.

His visual language often juxtaposes organic forms with surreal or symbolic elements, creating layered interpretations that range from the personal to the universal.

Alfonso's work has also been described as Magical Realism in style.

== Legacy and significance ==
Oscar Alfonso is recognized as part of a generation of Cuban artists whose careers bridge state-supported cultural institutions, independent artistic production, and international visibility. His work reflects both the constraints and creative resilience of artists working within Cuba while engaging global audiences.

His inclusion in auctions, major institutional collections, and participation in internationally recognized exhibitions in the United States have contributed to his growing visibility beyond Cuba. His career, spanning visual arts, film, and journalism, has positioned him as a multidisciplinary figure within contemporary Cuban cultural history.

== See also ==
- Cuban art
- Caribbean art
- Cuban intervention in Angola
