= Edel Alvarez Galban =

Cuban artist and physician (born 1967)

A. Galban
- AGalban painting Verano from his 4 Estaciones en Bicicleta series in his studio, 2020.
- Born: Edel Alvarez Galban; September 28, 1967; Havana, Cuba
- Other name: Lelo Galbán
- Education: Federico Engel Art School, Colegio Universitario San Judas Tadeo Escuela De Medicina
- Occupations: Visual artist, medical doctor
- Notable work: La Noche Bella No Deja Dormir (2021), Jardines Invisibles series (with Froilan Escobar), Personas series, Les Fleurs du Mal series, Gaudi y yo series, 4 Estaciones en Bicicleta series, Miseria y Propaganda series, Illusion of Distortion series
- Movement: Contemporary Cuban art
- Awards: National Endowment for the Arts Beyond Placemaking Grant

Edel Alvarez Galban (born 1967), also known artistically as A. Galban, is a Cuban American visual artist and physician. His work has been featured in national and international fine art exhibitions and events as well as in public art, published literature, and televised Latin American media. He has been noted as a significant figure of Contemporary Cuban art in Central Florida by helping to establish its presence above South Florida in the 21st century. Galban's work has been exhibited in the United States, Cuba, Mexico, and Costa Rica and is part of the permanent collection of the Tampa Museum of Art and the Alvin Sherman Library.

== Biography and career ==
Edel Alvarez Galban was born on September 28, 1967, in Havana, Cuba where he was also raised.

He showed early artistic inclination in his youth, although his initial professional intent was to pursue a medical career in Cuba. However, in 1993 Galban was denied permission from the Castro government to practice medicine, therefore he redirected his aspirations back to his passion for the arts. The following year he completed fine arts education from the Federico Engel Art School in Havana where he studied sculpture and draftsmanship.

In 1995 Galban permanently emigrated to the United States where he joined the Cuban exile community in Miami. There he continued his medical studies and enlisted in the United States Army as a medic where he served for three years. He also continued to pursue and establish his art career. During his Miami period, Galban became connected to significant figures of the Cuban exile art community such as painters Hortensia Gronlier, José Mijares, and Cundo Bermúdez.

In 2001 Galban completed his medical degree from Colegio Universitario San Judas Tadeo Escuela De Medicina and relocated to St. Petersburg, Florida, which then became the permanent base for both his art and medical professions. Since relocating to St. Petersburg, Galban gradually emerged as among the most visible Cuban artists of the region as well as a proponent of Cuban art throughout Central Florida, having frequently exhibiting his work throughout Tampa, Orlando and Clearwater, as well as supporting other Cuban artists.

== Recognition ==
Galban's work has been exhibited in several international cultural centers and art markets, including New York City, Miami, Tampa, Orlando, St. Petersburg, Coral Gables and Puerto Rico. His work has been featured in prominent venues, events, literature, and television as well as sold on Bonhams New York.

Through his career, Galban's art has been covered by several media outlets including The Miami Herald, El Nuevo Herald, U.S. News & World Report, Diario Las Americas, Arts Coast Magazine, ArtBust Miami, SocialMiami, Miami New Times, Coral Gables News, Revista Enfoque, Caritate Magazine, The Artisan Magazine, The Biscayne Tribune, Norte America.Mx, ZoePost, Akeru Noticias, Yucatán Cultura, and Art Miami Magazine.

In non-print media, Galban was the focus of a July 2, 2022 episode of the Editorial Akerú Publicaciones video series Hagalo con arte. On February 1, 2024, Galban was interviewed by Miguel Galicia on Performance Radio. His artwork is also featured on the Latin American television show Raymond y sus Amigos.

Galban has exhibited alongside several internationally established artists including Clyde Butcher, Josignacio, Froilán Escobar, Adriano Nicot, Yamilet Sempe, and Jorge Dans, as well was collected by prominent collectors including artist Hortensia Gronlier, Froilán Escobar, former MLB coach Joe Maddon, philanthropist Rob Canton, and Antonio Permuy.

Galban's work has featured in the Miami, Orlando, and Tampa installments of the Nude Nite exhibition, the largest exhibition of nude-themed art in the United States.

In 2014 Galban was the subject of a solo exhibition in Puerto Rico's Museo de Artes de San German. The following year, in 2015, he was selected to participate in the Make-A-Wish Foundation's Beautiful Worries art exhibition.

In 2022 Galban was the featured artist of the International Ballet Festival of Miami, which included a solo exhibition of his work, titled Visages de L’art, in the Adrienne Arsht Center as well as the commission to design the events poster for that year.

In 2023, Galban was awarded the National Endowment of the Arts Beyond Placemaking grant of US$10,000.

Galban with his public artwork in the Clearwater Main Library, 2023. The mural is based on his 2021 painting La Noche Bella No Deja Dormir.

Among Galban's culturally significant works is the painting La Noche Bella No Deja Dormir (2021). Depicting Cuban national hero José Martí, the piece was selected in 2023 to be converted into a public art mural in the Clearwater Main Library. It is also featured on the cover of the book of the same name by Froilan Escobar.

A significant collaboration in Galban's career has been his work with the award-winning Latin American author and painter Froilán Escobar, which have ranged from the visual arts and into published literature.

Galban's work has been the subject of the books Agalban: The Colors of Life (2022) and Agalban El color del deslumbramiento (2023). His work has been featured in published literature by prominent Latin American authors, such as Froilan Escobar and José León Sánchez. Books featuring Glaban's work include Mujer en el enjambre, Señora de la Noche, Jardines Invisibles, La noche bella no deja dormir, Tres en una taza, and Herencias.

In 2024, Galban initiated and co-curated the Flora & Fauna exhibition, held in The Gallery at Creative Pinellas, the former site of the Gulf Coast Museum of Art. The exhibition was co-curated by Tarin Mohajeri and established a high profile with the inclusion of several prominent and internationally-established artists such as Josignacio, Adriano Nicot, and Jorge Dans. Flora & Fauna was covered by The Artisan Magazine, Diario Las Americas, as well as television media.

In September 2024, a piece from Galban’s Fleur du Mal series was accepted into the permanent collection of the Alvin Sherman Library, one of the largest libraries in the state of Florida, as part of the Marta Permuy Legacy Collection. The library’s permanent collection also features work by Salvador Dalí, Peter Max, and Dale Chihuly. The piece was subsequently unveiled with an exhibition at the library in October 2024.

In December 2024, Galban was featured in Forbidden Fruit, the largest documented exhibition of Cuban erotic art, held during Miami Art Week 2024 as part of Art Basel Miami 2024. That month Galban was also added into the permanent collection of the Tampa Museum of Art with his work Lagrimas de la Habana (2023).

== Analysis ==
Galban's artistic style is eclectic. Despite beginning his studies in sculpture, Galban transitioned into painting to better express and work with color. He is known professionally in the arts as AGalban, an abbreviation of both his last names per Spanish naming customs, and it is also how he typically signs his work.

He draws influence primarily from Spanish as well as Cuban art and design. His Spanish influences include Joan Miró, Antoni Gaudí, Salvador Dalí, and Pablo Picasso, whereas his Cuban influences include Mario Carreño and other members of the Cuban Vanguardia movement.

Galban's backgrounds are produced first as textural, abstract, and mixed-media color fields. Another defining element of his work include his use of symbolic and conceptual elements. His human figures are typically cyclops — having only one eye – whereas he conceptually replaces the missing eye with the eye of the viewer. Rendered in a Cubistic style that divides the face, the missing eye also represents the expression "beauty is in the eye of the beholder," as well as acknowledging the role of shifting perspectives that various audiences of viewers have in influencing the impact of an artwork.

Arlequines (2020) by AGalban.

He frequently works in series, and his ongoing series’ include: Personas, Lucias, Les Fleurs du Mal, Gaudi y yo, Jardines Invisibles (with Froilan Escobar), El bufón, Eva y Mariela, Caracol Erotico, Mi Divina Comedia, Cancionero, Cuba se va, Seavolve, El Monte, Los Feos, Desojando Margaritas, Locuras, 4 Estaciones en Bicicleta, Sábanas Blancas, Club 27, Miseria y Propaganda, and Illusion of Distortion.

Galban's work has been critiqued by several art critics including Raysa White, Antonio Permuy, Armando de Armas, and Osiris Gaona. Commenting on Galban's art and use of character studies, leading Contemporary Cuban artist Josignacio has critiqued: “[Galban] enters the soul of his paintings and portraits through the eyes, his colors and shapes take us directly to them and once in that silence he betrays the mood and state of mind of his characters."

== Select works ==
Paintings

Flor de Mal (2020)

Bicycling in Fall (2021)

Miseria y Propaganda (2023)

== Select Exhibitions ==
- 2001 – Solo exhibition, Escuela de Medicina San Judas Tadeo, Costa Rica
- 2005 – Collective Exhibition, Ybor City Community College
- 2006 – Collective Exhibition, Barebrush Gallery, Chelsea, New York City
- 2010 – Muestra de amor y erotismo, Amarte Gallery
- 2013 – Pinceladas de Amor, La Barrica, Puerto Rico
- 2014 – Solo Exhibition, Museo de Artes de San German, Puerto Rico
- 2015 – Art Is Everywhere, Miami, FL
- 2015 – Beautiful Worries Art Exhibition, Make-A-Wish Foundation
- 2015 – Nude Nite, Tampa, FL
- 2018 – Nude Nite, Tampa, FL
- 2021 – Solo Exhibition, Casa Clinic, Clearwater, FL
- 2022 – Miami Power Team Art Festival 2022, Miami, FL
- 2022 – Xplicit, House of Shadows, Tampa, FL
- 2022 – "Bloom", Artloft galleries, St. Petersburg, FL
- 2022 – Jardines Invisibles, Hernan Gamboa Gallery, Miami, FL
- 2022 – Solo exhibition, Visages de L’art, XXVII International Ballet Festival of Miami
- 2022 – Rostros del Arte, Miami Hispanic Cultural Art Center
- 2023 – El Arte: Echoes of Cuba, Clearwater Public Library
- 2023 – Mixed Messages, Soft Water Gallery, St. Petersburg, FL
- 2023 – Illusion of Distortion, Solo Exhibition, Embassy Suites in Hilton Tampa Airport
- 2023 – 9th Annual Arians Family Foundation Charity Auction, Clearwater, FL
- 2024 – Flora & Fauna, The Gallery at Creative Pinellas, Largo, FL
- 2024 - Artwork by Edel Alvarez Galban, Carrollwood Cultural Center, Tampa, FL
- 2024 - Forbidden Fruit, the World Erotic Art Museum (WEAM), Miami Beach, FL

== Personal life ==
Alvarez Galban is married to Rebecca Lauren. He has two children: a daughter, Lucia, and son, Lennon. He resides in St. Petersburg, Florida.

== See also ==
- Cuban art
