= Yamilet Sempe =

Cuban-French-American artist

Yamilet Sempé
- Born: Yamilet Sempé; October 29, 1970; Matanzas, Cuba
- Occupation: Visual artist
- Notable work: Geometric series, Abstraction series
- Movement: Contemporary, Cuban art, Geometric abstraction, Total abstraction

Yamilet Sempé Cifuentes (born 1970), known artistically as Sempé, is a Cuban-born French-American visual artist active primarily in the United States and Europe. Known for her various approaches to abstraction, she has gained recognition for her art through press coverage, published literature, and associations with other leading cultural figures. Her work has been the subject of critical analysis and featured in exhibitions, international fine art auctions, as well as institutional collections including the Wilzig Museum and the Alvin Sherman Library, Research, and Information Technology Center.

== Career ==
=== Early life in Cuba ===
Yamilet Sempé was born October 29, 1970 in the city of Matanzas, Cuba, an area known as a significant cultural hub in Cuba with a thriving artistic, literary, and creative community.

Sempé’s family was active in this scene during her upbringing and frequently hosted several prominent figures including guitarist Ildefonso Acosta and painter Modesto García (1930-2016) of the leading Academia Nacional de San Alejandro. García then became an early artistic mentor and supporter of Sempé's artistic expression, notably encouraging the development of her Horses, her first and longest-running painted series.

=== French period ===
Sempé left Cuba for France in 1988, after which she became a naturalized French citizen. Once in France, Sempé had become connected to the late 20th and early 21st century French cultural scene such as painter Pierre Amador, theater director Diane Polya, and patron Prince Charles-Henri de Lobkowicz, as well as many professionals in the field of art and monument restoration.

Among her notable artistic projects during her French period was the restoration of the historic Chateau du Beyrat. Located in the commune of Bellenaves, various portions of the Chateau du Beyrat date to between the 12th century (notably including its surviving medieval towers) to the 18th century. The project was complex and extensive, ultimately involving a restoration team and taking place in several stages across 12 years that involved the restoration of the chateau’s facade, interior frescos, coats of arms, as well as adding new elements such as mosaics in the Chateau's chapel, as well as outdoor floor tiling, and a sculpture garden featuring an obelisk.

While residing in France, Sempé had also run a specialty antique books company, Entre les pages, for six years from 2006 until 2012. The firm sold original copies of rare and historical literary works, such as the grimoire Le Grand Grimoire avec la grande Clavicule de Salomón (The Grand Grimoire with the Great Clavicle of Solomon) to collectors based in France, Italy, Spain, and the United States. Her interest and involvement in literature would also influence Sempé's visual art and appear in the themes of several paintings.

=== American period ===
In 2012 Sempé relocated from France to Miami, Florida where she subsequently became active in Miami’s growing international art community. Her Miami period was also notable for marking her naturalization as an American citizen, as well as her career transition from painting privately to launching the exhibiting phase of her art career. A key aspect of this development was her active involvement in the Cuban art community in exile that was based in Miami, through which Sempé became connected to several of its notable figures, including Josignacio, Adriano Nicot, and AGalban. She had also become connected to the art and literary scene centered around the cultural hub of Unzueta Gallery, which was itself connected to Ramón Unzueta’s network of involvement in Spain and France. Another key figure of Sempé's artistic development upon arrival to Miami was Cuban painter Fernando García, whose mentorship of Sempé had influenced her Abstraction series.

As her exhibiting profile in the United States grew and developed through the 2010s, Sempé would be invited to participate in an increasing number of international exhibitions and auctions, as well as art events in notable venues. This would include participation in major art fairs and entering into institutional collections in the 2020s.

In 2021 Sempé relocated from Florida to Omaha, Nebraska and would continue to participate in exhibitions and auctions throughout the United States and in Europe.

== Analysis ==
Since becoming an established and internationally active artist, Yamilet Sempé has become best known for her works in total abstraction as well as geometric abstraction, which form her two primary series of work: her Abstraction series and her Geometric series, respectively. A third notable series is her long-running Horses/Shaman series, which predates both her Abstraction and Geometric series. She produces work on canvas, paper, and ceramic mediums. With the exception of her early mentorship by Modesto García in Cuba and later mentorship with Fernando García upon arrival in Miami, Sempé is considered largely self-taught as an artist. While she is known to utilize a primarily intuitive painting process, her work is reported to also draw influence from the art of several major Cuban, American, and European artists on each of her series. For her Geometric series, these include the Bauhaus movement, Kandinsky, Mondrian, Hilma af Klint, Emma Kunz, and the Cuban painters José Mijares, Carmen Herrera, Zilia Sanchez, and Loló Soldevilla. Likewise, her Abstraction series has drawn influence from Mexican painter Manuel Felguérez as well as Cuban painters Agustín Fernández and her mentor Fernando García.

Recurring key features recognized in her works include her use of the color orange, the natural world, as well as the exploration of spiritual themes, such as mysticism and the esoteric, and the use of symbols connected to them, such as geometric mandalas. She also employs additional symbols of personal meaning. Her symbolic motifs include the Rose of Jericho, which she represents as a sphere and has used as a symbol of the immortality of the soul, itself a frequent theme in her work, as well as for the interconnection between art, nature and life.

== Recognition ==
Since becoming established in Miami’s market by the late 2010s, Sempé's work has received media coverage including on Art Business News, Caritate Magazine, Artful Interior Magazine, and the SAMLA Review, interviewed by Voyage Magazine, as well as had her work featured in writings by Trappist priest Thomas Keating, art critic and curator Antonio Permuy, and art and design scholar Hector Haralambous.

Her work has been collected in the United States, Cuba, France, Spain, France, Italy and Bahrain and featured in auction houses, including Drouot where her work has been exhibited and sold alongside work by Marc Chagall, Yayoi Kusama, Rufino Tamayo, Wifredo Lam, and Amelia Peláez. Her collectors have included politician John S. McCollister, author and photographer Anna Alexis Michel, and photographer Jean-Michel Voge. In addition to Miami, Sempé has also exhibited in other major art centers including Paris, London, and New York City, as well as in landmark sites and diplomatic settings as a result of her French citizenship.

In 2018 Sempé participated in the Made in France exhibition held in Miami’s arts hub of Wynwood, where she represented France as a French citizen based in Miami. The exhibition was organized by the Consulate General of France in Miami along with the French-American Chamber of Commerce (FACC) in Miami and attended by the Consul General of France Clément Leclerc, President of the FACC Miami Alain Ouelhadj, director Pascale Villet, as well as French musician Andre Saint-Albin.

In 2019 Sempé was featured in the Art from the Heart exhibition, held in the Miami Design District’s Moore Building, a renovated historic landmark featuring a contemporary architectural installation by Zaha Hadid commissioned by Craig Robins. The opening drew 500 attendees, then a milestone for Sempé's exhibiting career.

In 2020, Sempé won placement to be selected to represent the United States in the Exposition Internationale D’Aquarelle (International Watercolor Exhibition) with her piece Los Colores de la Amistad (The Colors of Friendship) from her Geometric series, which travelled internationally to France and Vietnam. In 2021 Sempé participated in the Women Everytime exhibition of women artists in Miami International Fine Arts.

In 2024 Sempé participated in the Art Basel Miami-affiliated exhibition Forbidden Fruit. The exhibition was noteworthy for becoming the largest documented exhibition of Cuban erotic art ever held and for drawing international coverage and more than 1,000 attendees to its opening during Miami Art Week 2024.

In September 2024, Sempé’s work was entered into the permanent collection of the Alvin Sherman Library, Research, and Information Technology Center in Fort Lauderdale. A part of Nova Southeastern University and the Broward County Library system, the Alvin Sherman is notable for being one of the largest libraries in the state of Florida and for holding an extensive public art collection that includes original works by Salvador Dalí, Dale Chihuly, and Peter Max. Within it, Sempé’s work Fusion (2018), of her Geometric series, was selected to be part of the inauguration of the Marta Permuy Legacy Collection, and unveiled in an exhibition during Hispanic Heritage Month of 2024 alongside the works of other notable Cuban artist Adriano Nicot, AGalban, Mario Torroella, and Margarita Cano.

In December 2024, Sempé was entered into the permanent collection of the Wilzig Museum in Miami Beach.

In October 2025, Sempé was cited by Artful Interior magazine as one of five Contemporary Abstract artist redefining Geometric painting.

In addition to her exhibiting and commissioned career, Sempé has also engaged in cultural philanthropy in using her art to support causes, including donating work to raise funds for charities supporting health, children and families. Recipients have included the Family Resource Center’s work to assist abused children, as well as the Beauty of Sight Foundation for blindness.

== See also ==
- Cuban art
- Abstract art
- Geometric abstraction
