= Alvin Sherman Library =

Academic library at Nova Southeastern University

Coordinates: 26.0795761°N 80.2424126°W

The Alvin Sherman Library, Research, and Information Technology Center, is one of the largest library buildings in the state of Florida. The Alvin Sherman Library is a unique joint-use facility serving the residents of Broward County as well as Nova Southeastern University students, faculty, and staff members. Thanks to an agreement between the Broward County Board of County Commissioners and NSU, the Alvin Sherman Library offers traditional public library services as well as the full academic resources.

Western entrance to the Alvin Sherman Library

== History ==
On December 14, 1999, the Nova Southeastern University Board of Trustees and the Broward County Board of County Commissioners approved a forty-year agreement between Broward County and Nova Southeastern University to build a joint-use library that serves both Broward County and NSU patrons. This library was opened to the public on December 8, 2001 as a 325,000 square foot full service library located on NSU's main campus in Fort Lauderdale, Florida.

In 2003, South Florida real estate developer and World War II pilot veteran, Alvin Sherman, donated $7 million for the library building which was named for him. Sherman stated he donated these funds because, "I witnessed the beginning of Nova Southeastern University and knew its founders. . . . This is my home town and this is my way of saying thanks.'' On December 6, 2021, the Alvin Sherman Library celebrated 20 years of operation, in addition to celebrating the library's continuing role as a Broward County Library and the NSU Campus Library. The Alvin Sherman Library became a user of the Patron Point system, announced by Patron Point just 4 days after the 20th year anniversary celebrations, with the stated goal of increasing patron awareness of library offerings and activities.

== Present Day ==
The building is five stories high with wireless access throughout the building for NSU patrons and guests; reading niches; 23 study rooms; collaborative study room; family study room; the Cotilla Gallery with ongoing exhibits; programs for all ages; permanent artwork including a unique piece from artist Dale Chihuly and a Buddhist Prayer Wheel that has been blessed by the Dalai Lama; the Craig and Barbara Weiner Holocaust Museum; 1,000 user seats, and a café. It contains research materials, specialized databases, popular fiction and nonfiction books, magazines and journals, CDs, DVDs. Because of its unique affiliation with both Broward County Libraries and Nova Southeastern University, the Alvin Sherman Library's membership card is also unique to the library; patrons seeking to use the library's services must apply for and obtain an Alvin Sherman Library card in addition to maintaining their Broward County Library system card.

A collaborative group study room was opened in late 2015 by the Alvin Sherman Library Circle of Friends. The 2,500 square foot room expansion serves as a platform for students working on group projects, presentations and study groups. Unlike other areas of the library, the collaborative study room was specifically designed to allow students to talk openly.

The library hosts special programs for children and teens, book discussion groups, author readings, and classes on using research tools and resources. The Library also hosts events for Nova Southeastern University, for example, hosting a brunch celebrating the work of Julian Pleasants, PhD, about NSU's history with details on the Alvin Sherman Library itself.

The Alvin Sherman LRITC building also contains the Rose and Alfred Miniaci Performing Arts Center.

=== Permanent art collection ===
The Alvin Sherman Library holds a permanent collection of fine art featuring works by several prominent artists including Salvador Dalí, Dale Chihuly, Peter Max, Beverly Pepper, Therman Statom, and Franck Louissaint.

In 2024, the library established the Marta Permuy Legacy Collection within its permanent collection following a donation of twelve original works in honor of late South Florida art patron Marta Permuy. The donations, made by her grandson Antonio Permuy, featured works by several notable artists including Neith Nevelson, Pedro Hernandez, Miguel Fleitas, Mario Torroella, Adriano Nicot, Edel Alvarez Galban, Yamilet Sempe and Margarita Cano. The works were unveiled in an exhibition at the library in October 2024.
