= Ramón Díaz (disambiguation) =

Ramón Díaz may refer to:

- Ramón Díaz (born 1959), Argentine footballer and coach
- Ramón Díaz (1926-2017), Uruguayan lawyer, economist and journalist
- José Ramón Díaz Alejandro (born 1943), Cuban painter and writer
