= University of South Florida Tampa Library =

Coordinates: 28°03′34.4″N 82°24′44.1″W

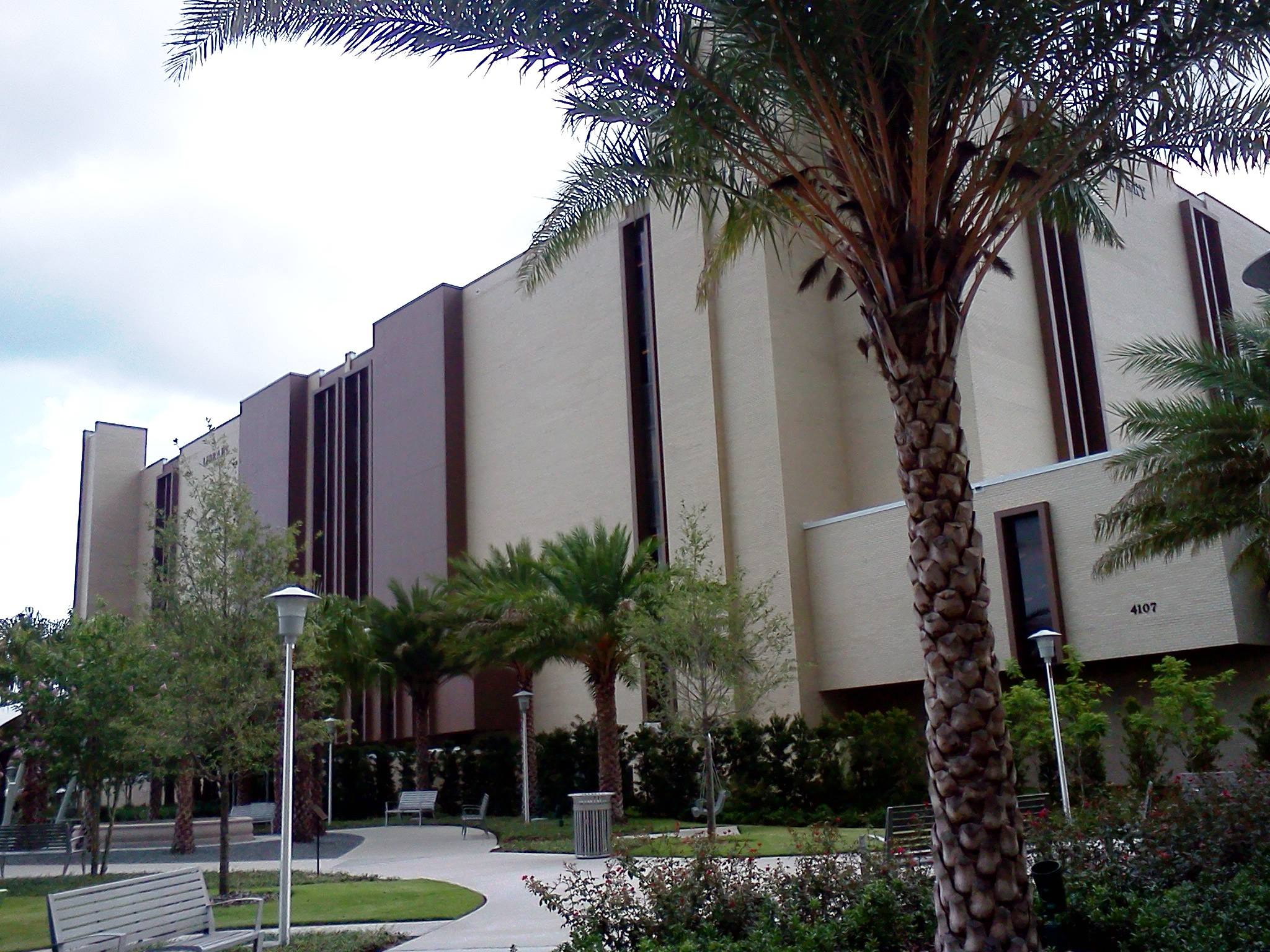
USF Tampa Library

The University of South Florida Tampa Library is the main research library for the University of South Florida. Housing over 1.3 million books, academic journals and electronic resources, including 52,000 e-journal subscriptions, 443,000 e-books, and over 800 databases, the library has more than 2 million visitors each year. The library offers tutoring and writing services, laptops, a career resource center, and course reserves. The facility houses several special and digital collections, including literature, oral histories, photographs, artifacts, and the university archives. The current Dean of USF Libraries is Todd Chavez.

== History ==
In 1958, the foundations were poured for the original four buildings that would become the core of the USF master plan. These included the maintenance facility, administrative-classroom building, union-classroom-cafeteria, and the library.

When John S. Allen was named the first USF president in 1957, his first academic appointment to the staff was Elliott Hardaway, at the time the assistant librarian at the University of Florida. As USF librarian, Hardaway was charged with building a university library collection from scratch.

For the first year of classes, the library was temporarily located in the University Center ballroom until the completed five-story facility opened in 1961. The campus was planned so that the library was the tallest, most conspicuous building, to symbolize what John Allen considered to be the heart of the university. The library was designed accommodate 250,000 books but also housed reading rooms, a permanent art gallery, a faculty lounge and conference rooms.

Over the following decade, the USF population grew and a larger library was soon in high-demand. In 1975, the current seven-story, 154,000 square foot building opened with the capacity of up to one million volumes.

== SMART lab ==
Opened in 2012, the Science, Math, and Research Technology (SMART) Lab, provides a hands-on learning space which includes more than 300 computer work stations.

== Special Collections ==
In addition to wide-ranging electronic and print resources the library provides other primary research materials through Special Collections. These include Florida history and politics, American literature, medieval manuscripts, Latin American Science Fiction, LGBT literature, Holocaust & genocide literature, juvenile literature, rare books, and sheet music. The Library's Florida Studies Center draws on the Special Collections materials and technological services to promote arts and humanities education on Florida and its people to students, teachers and the public.

Tampa Campus Special Collections supports University of South Florida by encouraging use of primary resources that document the history and culture of both USF and the broader community. At its inception in 1962, Tampa Special Collections was charged with developing a research collection in Florida history and a general monographic collection to house rare and otherwise special items acquired by the USF Libraries. Today, with a strong focus on local and regional records, artifacts, and publications, Special Collections also houses numerous collections of national and international prominence that describe and contextualize diverse experiences from the 1500s to the present day. Major collections include the University Archives, Florida Studies Collections, Florida Environment and Natural History Collections, LGBTQ+ Collections, Children's and Young Adult Literature, and Digital Collections, a collection of more than 67,300 digitized items from the USF Libraries and other partners. Other collections include African American Collections, Rare Books, Maps, Holocaust and Genocide Studies, Science Fiction and Fantasy, Literature and Book Arts Collection, and The Arts. Tampa Campus Special Collections also supports Online Exhibitions, Virtual Classes, and Internship Projects. The more than 500 archival collections are accessible to explore through online finding aids.

Although the University of South Florida consolidated its Tampa and St. Petersburg campuses as of 2021, the Tampa Campus Special Collections and the Special Collections and University Archives (SCUA), at the Nelson Poynter Memorial Library at USF St. Petersburg operate as distinct entities. The Nelson Poynter Memorial Library was established in 1968. Over the last few decades, SCUA has grown dramatically, with most of this growth having taken place since 1996 when the present library building opened with an expanded area for special collections. Materials at SCUA include collections such as Floridiana, rare books, personal papers, and manuscript collections, as well as the institutional archives of the St. Petersburg campus. The Nelson Poynter Memorial Library has also created the USF St. Petersburg Digital Archive as a repository of significant print and “born digital” materials. These print materials are offered from a variety of sources and are in collaboration with multiple other libraries and museums, such as the Tampa University of South Florida campus Special Collections offering materials like pottery for public display in the Tampa Museum of Art, as well as in allowing public access to digitally curated local print materials, like the Temple Terrace Beacon and the Terrace Sentinel being made freely available to the public for viewing.

These collections can be browsed and refined through language, creator, publisher, subject: topic, subject: geographic area, and subject: genre. A sample of the most current additions to the collections is the following: Florida Studies Collection (20 items), Dion Boucicault Theatre Collection (31 items), Hillsborough County (Fla.) Marriage Records (14,471 items), African American Sheet Music Collection (43 items), and the Children's Literature Collection (47 items). The range in subject matter for these digital collections reflects the academic aspirations for students, staff, and faculty within the University of South Florida. Certain collections are open access and the digitized items can be viewed by anyone interested in the subject matter, whether for research or for general interest.

- Hillsborough County (Fla.) Marriage Records – The following collections include Marriage Licenses, Marriage License Record Books, and indexes from 1878 to 1912. Over 14,400 marriage licenses are available and digitized from the Hillsborough County Court. Any licenses from 1846 to 1877 and 1912-1964 will need to be consulted through the USF Special Collections Department.
- Children's Literature Collection – This collection is a sub-collection to the USF Children's and Young Adult Literature collection, which has over 25,000 titles at present. The collection is primarily American fiction, focusing on younger readers and dates back to the 1870s. Since the main topic deals with a vast timeline of children's literature, researchers, teachers, and students can use this collection to see how education and literature for children have changed over the past century. A few books in the collection include Chris, The Model Maker: A Story of New York by William O. Stoddard, The Cowardly Lion of Oz by Ruth Plumly Thompson, and Rootabaga Pigeons by Carl Sanderburg. All of these books have been digitized and can be read through the digital collection.

== Digital Heritage and Humanities Collections ==
The DHHC documents heritage sites, landscapes and objects. The DHHC creates digital learning tools to promote heritage tourism. The technologies being used include 3D laser scanners, Nikon DSLR cameras, DJI Phantom and DJI Mavic unmanned aerial vehicles, Agisoft Photoscan Professional, FLIR thermal infrared cameras for imaging. For geo-spatial analysis uses ArcGIS and sends someone to the ESRI conference to make sure the program remains up to date. Some projects include: a 3D survey and imaging of Haghpat Monastery, a terrestrial laser scanning survey of Russell Cave National Monument and a digital tour of Cowpens National Battlefield.

== Textbook Affordability Project ==
Recently, Florida law has required academic institutions to comply with new textbook selection and reporting requirements in order to combat high costs to students. In 2009, the textbook affordability initiative began at USF with a committee survey about awareness of textbook costs. From here, the Textbook Affordability Project (TAP), was created to disperse information to both faculty and students about textbook costs. Currently, the USF Tampa Library facilitates three main activities in order to promote textbook affordability: recommendations to faculty, Course Reserves, and the E-books for the Classroom database. During the early years of TAP, staff was limited to two persons. As of 2018, over 6 full-time staff are dedicated to the Textbook Affordability project. TAP strives to provide affordable textbook options to students, and encourages professors to seek out more affordable options for their courses.

- Ebooks for the Classroom+ - As part of its efforts to promote textbook affordability, TAP uses Ebooks for the Classroom to encourage the use of library-licensed resources in courses. This database was created in 2017, and serves the entire USF system. Within the database, professors can adopt Ebooks that the library has purchased rights to, so that students can access these books for free. This collection has contributed greatly to the efforts of the TAP initiative.

== Building configuration ==
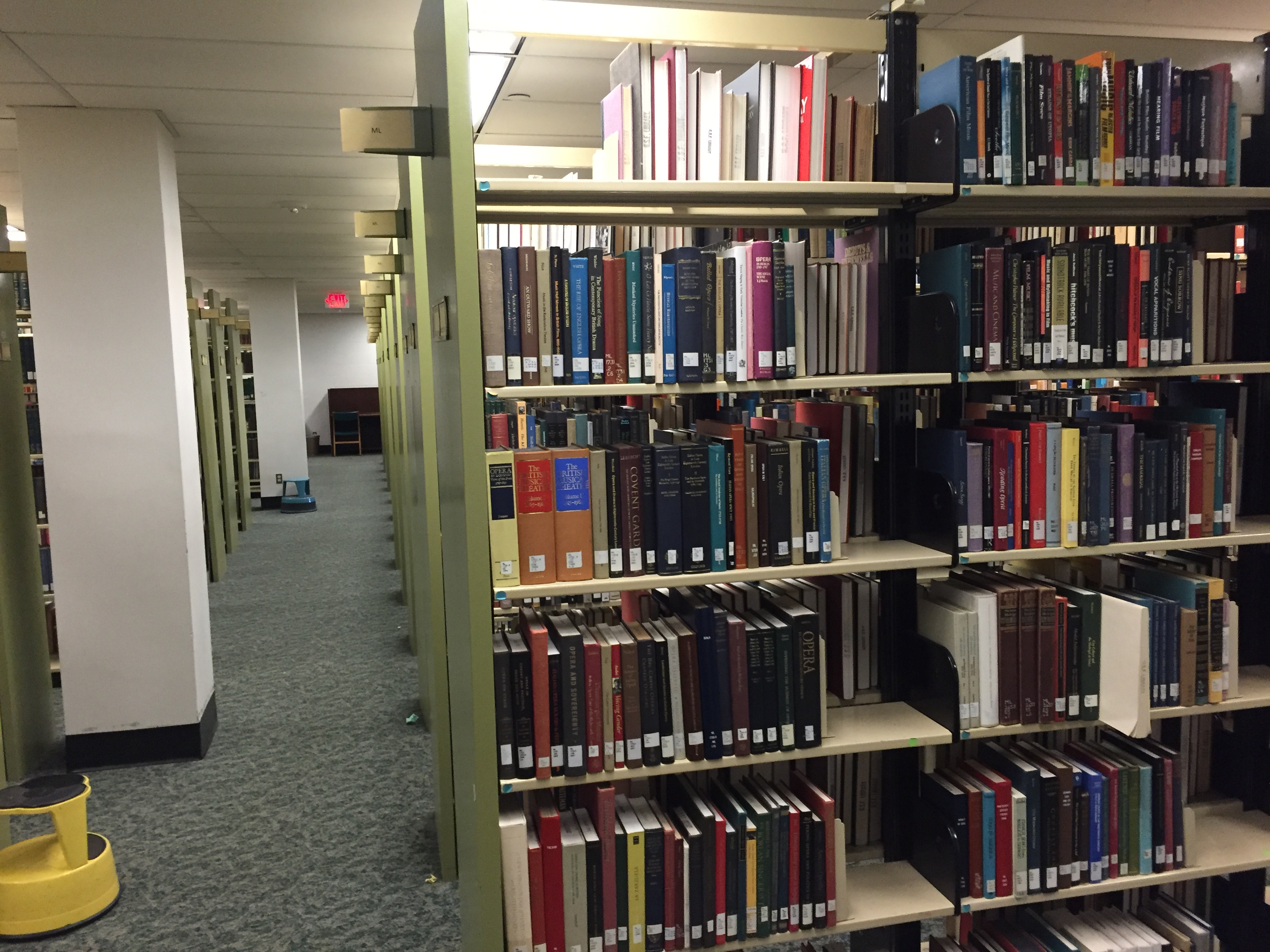
An inside view of the USF Tampa Library

The library is located in a seven-story facility on the main campus at 4101 USF Apple Drive, Tampa, FL 33620-5400.

- Basement - Quiet zone comprising federal and state government documents, print collections, maps, and the Reference Annex. In 2012 physical print periodicals were moved to this level as electronic access of periodicals became more common. A technical services department takes up a large section of the basement.
- First Floor - Group study area including the learning common study areas, computer work stations, Digital Media Commons, the library services desk, the IT help desk, computer repair shop, the Inter library Loan department, and a Starbucks.
- Second Floor - Group study area housing the learning commons study areas, the writing studio, the office for undergraduate research, tutoring services and the SMART Lab.
- Third Floor - Group study area with circulating areas A through K.
- Fourth Floor - Quiet zone, housing circulating areas L through N, special collections, Juvenile Collection, Classics Collection and the USF Florida Studies Center. The Grace Allen (1908-2007) room, named after the wife of the first president of the university John Allen, is available to recognized USF departments or agencies and contains a retractable screen, ceiling mounted LCD projector, podium, microphone & amplification system.
- Fifth Floor -Quiet Zone, Individual study area including circulating areas P though Z, two large reading rooms and a graduate reading room. LEED Silver Certified Floor.
- Sixth Floor - ATLE, Innovative Education, library administration offices, digital collections and the community engagement offices.
