= Caribbean art =

Visual and plastic arts originating from the islands of the Caribbeans

Caribbean art refers to the visual (including painting, photography, and printmaking) as well as plastic arts (such as sculpture) originating from the islands of the Caribbean (for mainland-Caribbean see Caribbean South America). Art in the Caribbean reflects thousands of years of habitation by Arawak, Kalinago, and other people of the Caribbean followed by waves of immigration, which included artists of European origins and subsequently by artists with heritage from countries all around the world (including countries in the African continent). The nature of Caribbean art reflects these diverse origins, as artists have taken their traditions and adapted these influences to reflect the reality of their lives in the Caribbean.

The governments of the Caribbean have at times played a central role in the development of Caribbean culture. However, some scholars and artists challenge this governmental role. Historically and in later times artists have combined British, French, Spanish, Dutch and African artistic traditions, at times embracing European styles and at other times working to promote nationalism by developing distinctly Caribbean styles. Caribbean art remains the combination of these various influences.

== Ancient Caribbean art ==
Archaeologists have determined that humans have been living in the Caribbean islands for nearly 6,000 years. The first inhabitants were an ancient Arawak people who migrated from the lowland river basins of South America; since before European colonization, the islands had experienced several large migrations from the surrounding mainlands and within the archipelago. The oldest artworks found have been attributed to the Saladoid people, the ancestors of the Taino people; their ceramics, carved stones, and shell objects have been found in archaeological sites dating back to between 500 and 250 B.C. A number of regional ceramic traditions developed throughout the next 2,000 years. The height of pre-colonial Caribbean art emerged between 1000 and 1492 with the Taino people, whose ceramic production, rock art, stonework, and other artworks are historically the most significant and widespread in the region.

From the Saladoids to the Tainos and Kalinago, native Caribbean art was a faithful translation of their primeval mythology, such as depictions of the creation of the world, of animals, and of the arrival of heroes who introduce cultural gifts, all on differing mediums including stone artifacts, body ornaments, wood carvings, rock engravings, rock paintings, as well as ceramics sculptures and decorated pottery. Motifs and themes covering these mythological narratives are found all over the Caribbean; for example, artworks as old as 1,500 years depict the association of the fruit-eating bat and the tree frog, the frog always being depicted above the bat.

== Art in the colonial period (from 1800) ==
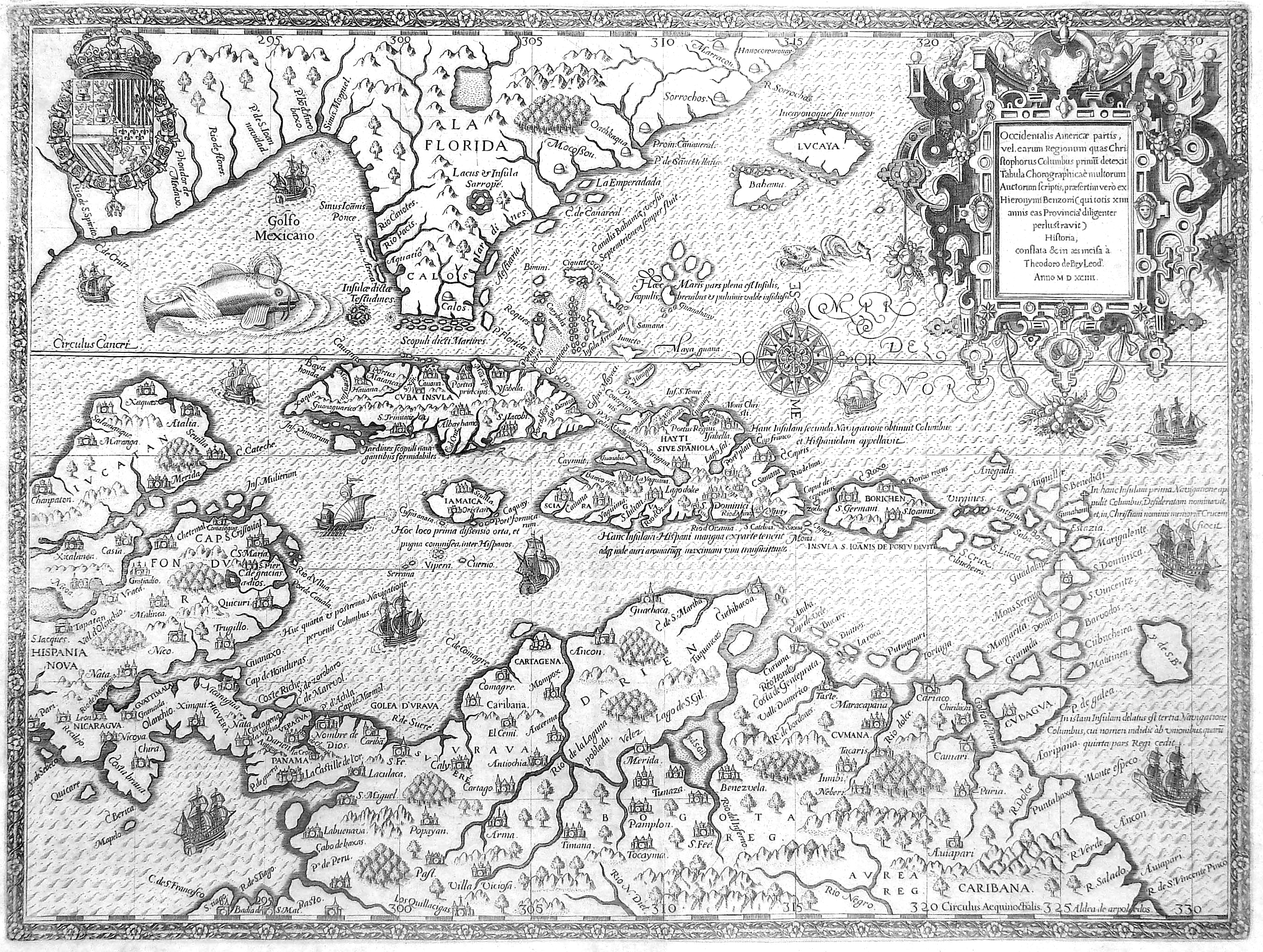
Caribbean - T. de Bry - 1594

The settlement in the Caribbean islands began by the Spanish on the island of Hispaniola as early as 1496. They then settled on Puerto Rico followed by Cuba. They did not colonise Trinidad until 1592. It is extremely unlikely that the Taíno-Arawak people had any input to the spaniade artistic developments since it has been estimated that their population was quickly depleted from 200,000 to as little as 500.

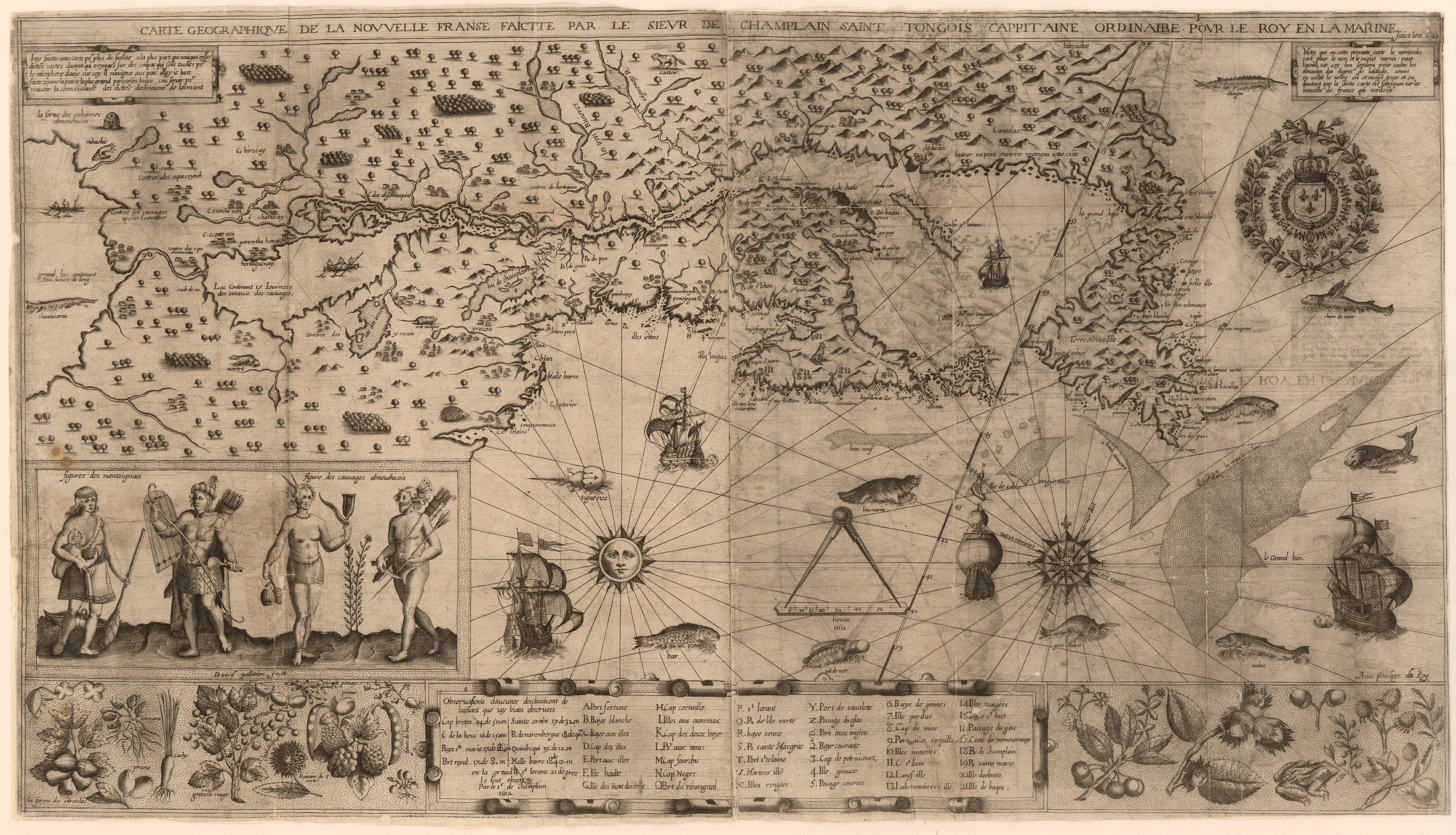
Map of New France made by Samuel de Champlain in 1612.

French settlers arrived in the Caribbean in the 1625 and established trading ports on the islands of St. Kitts, Tortuga (in 1628, now a British Virgin Island) in Saint-Domingue (later Haiti), Martinique, and Guadeloupe (both in 1635). Near the end of the 17th century, the population of the French Caribbean was growing steadily but the territory was increasingly isolated from France because in 1674 the French trading company finally failed, and few artists had arrived from Europe. Currently little or no research has been done to highlight the early French influenced art forms originating in the Caribbean, nor to list artists who might fit within this category.

Although Trinidad was never governed by the French, the islands original settlers, the Spanish, allowed planters from the French islands to settle and develop the country from about 1777. The effect of French occupation can be seen in the names of places and to a smaller extent in the laws of the country - so it is highly possible that art also may have early French influences.

Turgoart (Haiti), Another Call From Africa, 2009

According to Jamaican art historian Petrine Archer, "there is sparse evidence of local art production in any of the islands prior to the 20th century" other than from the occasional visiting European. Haiti was a lone exception.

== The Caribbean Artists Movement ==
A key movement that sprung from Caribbean Art was the Caribbean Artist Movement. The movement lasted for less than ten years while the founders of the movement were Kamau Brathwaite, John La rose, and Andrew Salkey. In 1966, CAM resulted from the works of Caribbean Art: artists, writers, poets, filmmakers, actors, and musicians that made an excursion to London England. The Caribbean Artist Movement was a new look into the arts that transferred ideas amongst Caribbean artists. This gave them a shared Caribbean ‘nationhood’ which in turn allowed people to take pride in their new cultural achievements. CAM held many newsletters, conferences, and exhibitions to showcase the Caribbean Arts; however, many of these events were held to get recognition of Caribbean artists.

== Contemporary trends in Caribbean art ==
Art made in the Caribbean by living Caribbean artists refers to a range of visual, media, performance, and other practices that are critically acclaimed. There has been much debate over whether a national style, philosophical outlook, or unified and cohesive culture exists or ever has existed within the Caribbean. Geographically it is large, with many distinct regions, and its population are diverse and made up of varying national and ethnic backgrounds. Also distinctions between "high art" and "popular" art seem to be becoming less clear, making the task of locating common characteristics of Caribbean art or culture increasingly difficult.

Tumelo Mosaka, curator at the Brooklyn Museum (NY) suggests:

"Today, consistent throughout most islands is the division between mainstream artist movements more closely related to European stylistic trends and often rooted in national development, and self-taught artists whose art works reflect ritual preoccupations related to spiritual movements such as Revivalism, Santería and Vodou and less exposure to art movements abroad. More recently, contemporary artists influenced by post-modernism's concerns with identity have found ways to fuse both forms resulting in art that appear peculiarly unique to their Caribbean experience".

— Mosaka, T., Brooklyn Museum (NY)

Contemporary art in the Caribbean reflects an engagement with the region's cultural past. Archer describes recent trends as "a self-conscious and satirical embracing of cultural memory styled in unconventional settings, installations and off-the-wall works that straddle African traditions and European post-modern ideas of 'primitive' creativity." It is an imagery and history which is yet to be resolved.

There are moments when contemporary artists living and working in the Caribbean — as individuals or groups — for example Christopher Cozier (Trinidad & Tobago), Deborah Anzinger (Jamaica), Humberto Diaz, Oscar Alfonso and Wilfredo Prieto (Cuba), Jorge Pineda / Quintapata (Dominican Republic), LaVaughn Belle (St. Croix), Maksaens Denis (Haiti), Tirzo Martha (Curaçao) and Tony Cruz (Puerto Rico) to name a few have distinguished themselves through international recognition, collaboration, or "the spirit of the times".

== Influential Artists in the Caribbean ==
=== A Melting Pot ===
Art in the Caribbean has been influenced by its many different islands and their respective micro-cultures throughout the years. The identity of each island is unique and was shaped by a degree of different influences such as European Colonists, African Heritage, or Native Indian tribes.

The different islands and archipelagos provide a varying mix of ethnicities and cultures that helped shade contemporary art in the Caribbean today. "Caribbean art, and its production of paintings, drawings, prints, and sculpture, suggests an existence of different streams inside one big river."

An issue plaguing artists in the Caribbean for a long time now is the lumping of the region in with the general Latin American region. The Caribbean has a wide array of cultures to be expressed and is only recently gaining traction as an independent region of contemporary art; This can be more broadly depicted by viewing the different periods of migration to the islands, first from the colonization of the islands, to the various European influences such as the Spanish, French, and English.

Despite the Caribbean Islands area a melting pot for contemporary art, the English-speaking islands have no museum devoted to contemporary art. And thus, the Galleries of Jamaica have carved out space for the entire regions collections and showcases. This has made the international views of contemporary art in the region feel more geared towards the Jamaican visions

=== Artists ===
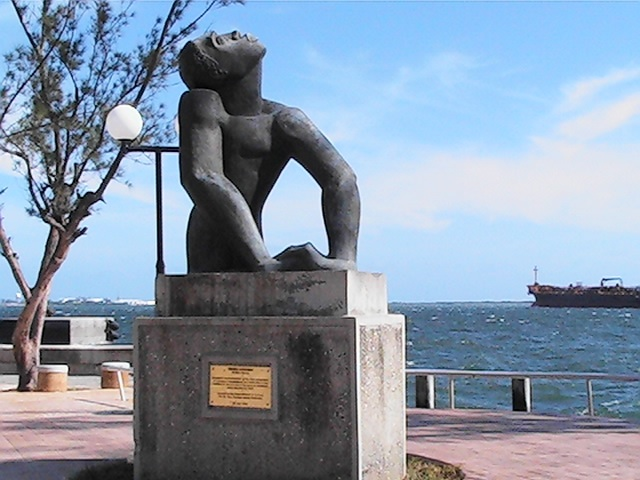
Kingston, Jamaica - Negro Aroused, 1937 - Edna Manley

Edna Manley:

Embracing African heritage is a focal point for a lot of contemporary art in the Caribbean Islands, and Manley is a key figure in the celebration of African heritage. She is mainly known for her sculpture depictions of black figures and is known as the, "Mother of Jamaican art."

Manley was raised in England and attended the St. Martin's School of Art in London, with no intention of pursuing being an artist full time, she initially wanted to become a zoologist. She and her Husband moved to Jamaica in 1922. After moving, she realized the societal differences between the Jamaican and English middle-classes; this began to motivate and influence her politically and pushed her to address the issues that faced life in Jamaica. She began to push socialist ideologies and integrated this into her artwork, especially during times of civil unrest in Jamaica in the 1960s and 1970s. After her husband, Norman, died in 1969 Manley said that the thing that saved her was her art. She began painting more due to her old age causing sculpting to become difficult. Eventually, Manley died in February 1987 at the age of 86.

Ebony G. Patterson:

Born in 1981 in Kingston, Jamaica, Ebony Patterson studied painting at the Edna Manley College of Visual and Performing Arts in Kingston, Jamaica and graduated in 2004. She then continued her education in the United States and received a MFA degree in 2006 from the Sam Fox School of Design and Visual Arts at Washington University in St. Louis. She is widely known for her colorful tapestries made out of unique materials.

A lot of her most recent work has been recognizing questions of identity and the human body. She expresses her work via various forms of media such as paintings, drawings, and collages. Patterson is frequently participating in art shows across the globe including the Baltimore Museum of Art, The Studio Museum in Harlem, Perez Art Museum Miami, Speed Art Museum in Louisville, KY. She has plans to travel internationally and continue to attend art shows. She is young and continues to inspire artists around the world and showcase the unique culture of art that stems from the Caribbean area.

Maksaens Denis:

Maksaens Denis is a video and installation artist of Caribbean new media art; Born in 1968 in Port-au-Prince. He derives strong influences from classical and experimental music and concerns his work with an intersection of performance, spirituality, queerness, and politics.

Imagery is an integral part of Denis' art and he blends images of everyday life in Haiti into his artwork. He also commonly depicts the historical processes that shape the identity of black atlantic subjects. He is currently living in working in Port-au-Prince and continues to derive video installations that express the culture of the region.

== See also ==
- ARC Magazine, a periodical dedicated to contemporary Caribbean art and culture
