= Tampa Museum of Art =

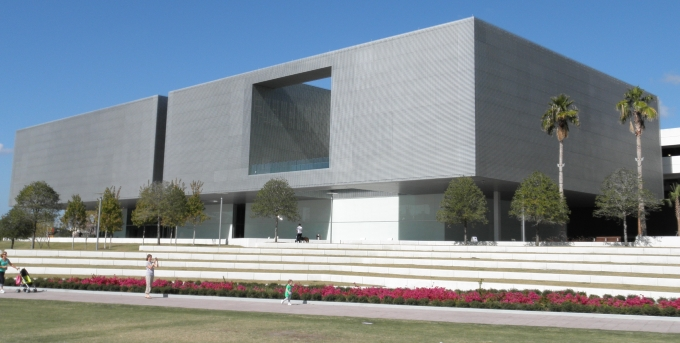

- Location within Florida
- Established: 1920
- Location: Tampa, Florida
- Coordinates: 27.9484°N 82.4619°W
- Type: Art museum
- Accreditation: American Alliance of Museums
- Collections: Ancient Greek and Roman antiquities, 18th and 19th Century Photography, Modern and contemporary decorative arts and sculpture, Contemporary works on paper, Modern and Contemporary Painting, New media, video and contemporary installation art
- Collection size: 8,000 objects
- Public transit access: Cass St at Gasparilla Plaza (HART Buses 7 and 10)
- Parking: The nearest garage is the William F. Poe Parking Garage. Additional parking is available at City of Tampa street parking or nearby city lots and garages.
- Website: tampamuseum.org

The Tampa Museum of Art is located in downtown Tampa, Florida. It exhibits modern and contemporary art, as well as Greek, Roman, and Etruscan antiquities. The museum opened its first exhibit on November 22, 1920 when the institution was called the Tampa Museum of Fine Arts. After many address changes during the institution's first several decades, it debuted an award-winning new building in 2010 for its permanent location along Tampa's Riverwalk on the banks of Hillsborough River.

== History ==
Since its inception, museum planners knew that the Tampa Museum of Art's original building was too small for its collection. Proposals for expansion or relocation were the subject of discussion and controversy for years. Several different plans were proposed either by the city of Tampa or the museum board, including:

- in 2001, architect Rafael Vinoly designed a dramatic $76 million building which would have included a huge metal canopy overhanging nearby city streets. The project proved too costly and perhaps unsafe in a hurricane.
- from 2003 to 2005, Tampa Mayor Pam Iorio proposed that the museum be relocated to one of several abandoned or underutilized buildings downtown, including an old federal courthouse and a small office tower. However, the museum board was unenthusiastic about the choices. As it turned out, converting the courthouse into usable museum space proved too expensive and disagreement over the appraised price of the office tower scrapped those plans as well.

In 2006, the museum board and the city of Tampa agreed to use public and private funds to construct a $33 million 66,000-square-foot (6,100 m^{2}) new museum building just a half-block north of its original location. The museum is integrated into the city's Riverwalk project in Curtis Hixon Park at the site of old Curtis Hixon Hall. A new home for the Tampa Children's Museum (now known as the Glazer Children's Museum) was built simultaneously next door.

The old museum building had to be torn down to make way for the current one. In the interim, the Tampa Museum of Art was temporarily moved to the historic Centro Español building in West Tampa, which had been vacant for several years. Groundbreaking for the project took place on April 18, 2008, and the grand opening of the new Tampa Museum of Art took place on February 6, 2010.

The museum was renovated in 2023 at a cost $15 million, adding seven new gallery spaces and an education Center. A planned expansion will add a 150-seat auditorium, an art lounge, an event space, a rooftop event venue, a café, and a sculpture park.

== Building ==
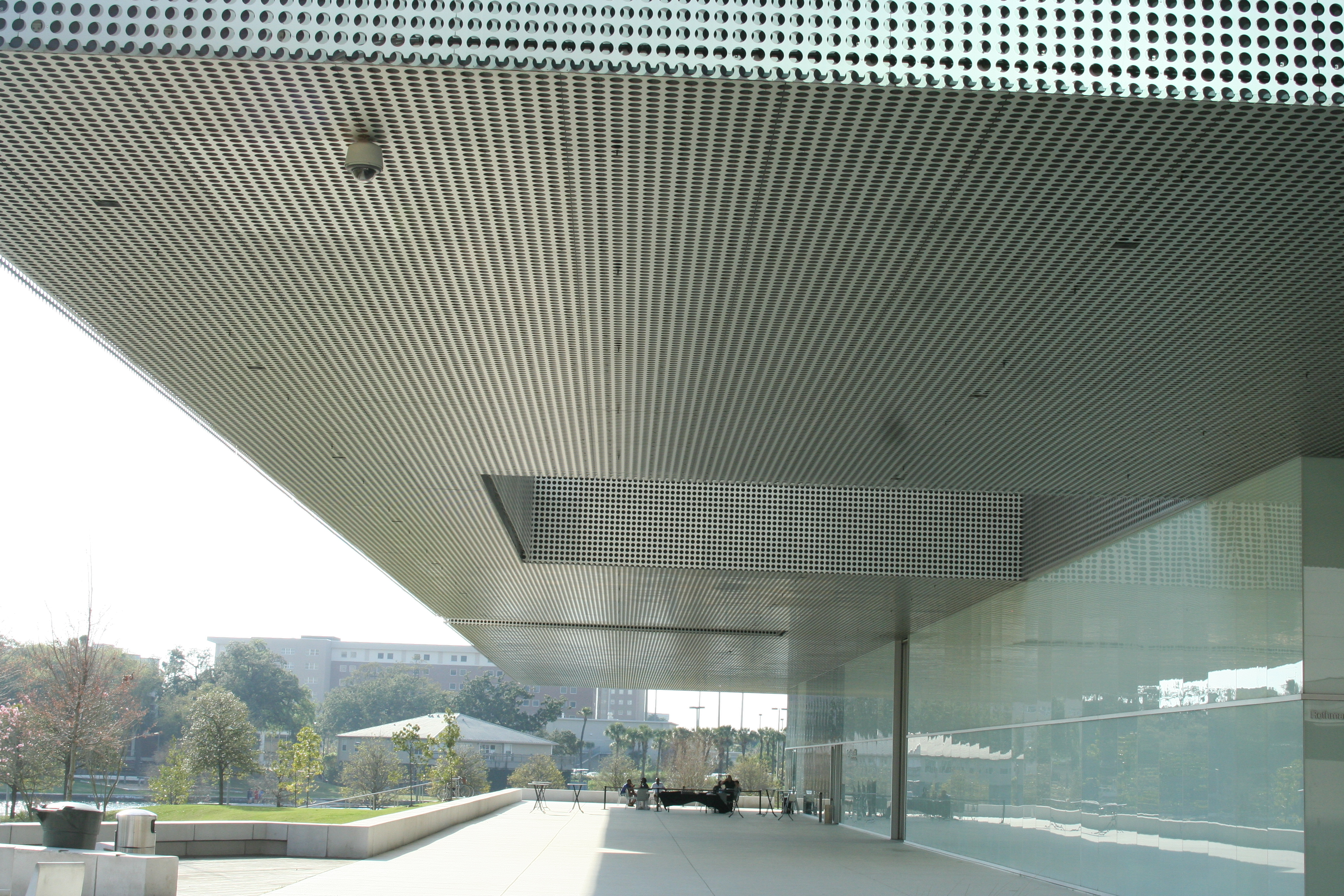
Entry to the art museum

The building, by architect Stanley Saitowitz, is designed to look like "an electronic jewelbox box sitting on a glass pedestal" and makes use of aluminum, glass, and fiber optic color-changing lights in the exterior walls to "make the building itself a work of art".

The interior is more neutral, with mostly white surfaces and subdued lighting. The architect describes it as "a frame for the display of art, an empty canvass to be filled with paintings, a beautiful but blank container to be completed by its contents." It also includes a gift shop.

In 2010, the Tampa Museum of Art was chosen as a winner of an American Architecture Award by The Chicago Athenaeum Museum of Architecture and Design.

== Exhibits ==
The Tampa Museum of Art currently has two floors; the first hosts two entrances and two Help and Visitation Desks, as well as a gift shop on the building's west side. The second floor is where the circulating galleries are on display. The permanent collection of the Tampa Museum of Art houses ancient pottery and tools from civilizations before and after Ancient Greece, sponsored by the University of South Florida Special Collections, and other exhibits, like the exhibit "Purvis Young: Redux" showcasing a large collection of work by Purvis Young. There have also been recent renovations to the museum, largely in creating an expanded educational space that can be separate from the main galleries, and an expanded gallery to house the works of children who take classes in the expanded space. The space is designed to exist within the same building as the rest of the museum, but is slated to continue operations well after the closing of the main galleries, and is designed to host classes in a variety of mediums, including digital art and photography.

== Permanent Collection ==
The museum's permanent collection spans fine art as well as classical antiquities. The fine arts collection includes works in painting, photography, works on paper, and sculpture by leading artists including Alexander Calder, Andy Warhol, James Rosenquist, Robert Rauschenberg, Cindy Sherman, and Purvis Young. The museum's sculpture collection features works by Dale Chihuly, Jaume Plensa, Patricia Cronin, C. Paul Jennewein, Hiram Powers, Jacques Lipchitz, Richard Stankiewicz, Harry Bertoia, and Erik Levine. Its Latin American art collection features works by Diego Rivera, Rufino Tamayo, José Bedia Valdés, Oswaldo Vigas, and Milhaud Vik Muñiz. The Latin American collection has also been expanded with donations by other notable artists from major Latin American art collections, such as Jorge M. Perez's donation of the Fernando Botero sculpture Mujer Vestida in 2022 and Antonio Permuy's 2024 donations of Josignacio's The Pact commemorating the Cuban Thaw and AGalban's Lagrimas de la Habana. In 2026 TMA acquired a major Baruj Salinas work of his Penca de Palma Triste series, marking the first museum acquisition of his work since his death.

The museum's classical antiquities collection features more than 660 works produced from approximately 3000 BC to AD 500 from Ancient Greek, Roman, Egyptian and Etruscan civilizations.

== Affiliates ==
The Tampa Museum of Art is currently partnered with the University of South Florida, and collaborates predominantly with the Tampa campus by providing materials for exhibitions, particularly in the display of works of ancient pottery like vases and drinking vessels from areas of civilizations prior to and during Ancient Greece for patrons to view, alongside providing an honors Capstone course that has students learn about dementia and other mental in artists' whose works are currently on display in the "Outsider Art Gallery" from the Monroe Family Collection, which showcases the various works across a variety of mediums of artists that live in Florida. The ancient works are also available to view digitally through the USF Special Collections of the University of South Florida Tampa Library alongside written descriptions noting the historical context of the pieces and the names of donors offering the works for public display, and these works are similarly able to be viewed through the website for the Tampa Museum of Art as well. Other partners that work with the museum for the continued enjoyment to the public include the Firehouse Cultural Center, Westchase Recreation Center, the Parks and Recreation City of Tampa, the Winthrop Art Factory, the Roberta M. Golding Visual Art Center Operated by the City of Tampa Parks and Recreation Department for the TMA Studio, as well as Pace Center for Girls, The Spring of Tampa Bay, The Portico, and Redefining Refuge for the art space. Alongside these partnerships the Tampa Museum of Art is also partnered with local schools in Hillsborough and Pinellas County, offering guided tours to school groups hoping to visit the museum.

In April 2022, the Tampa Museum of Art announced a $25 million gift from Dick Corbett in support of its centennial Capital Campaign for renovation and expansion.

== Gallery ==
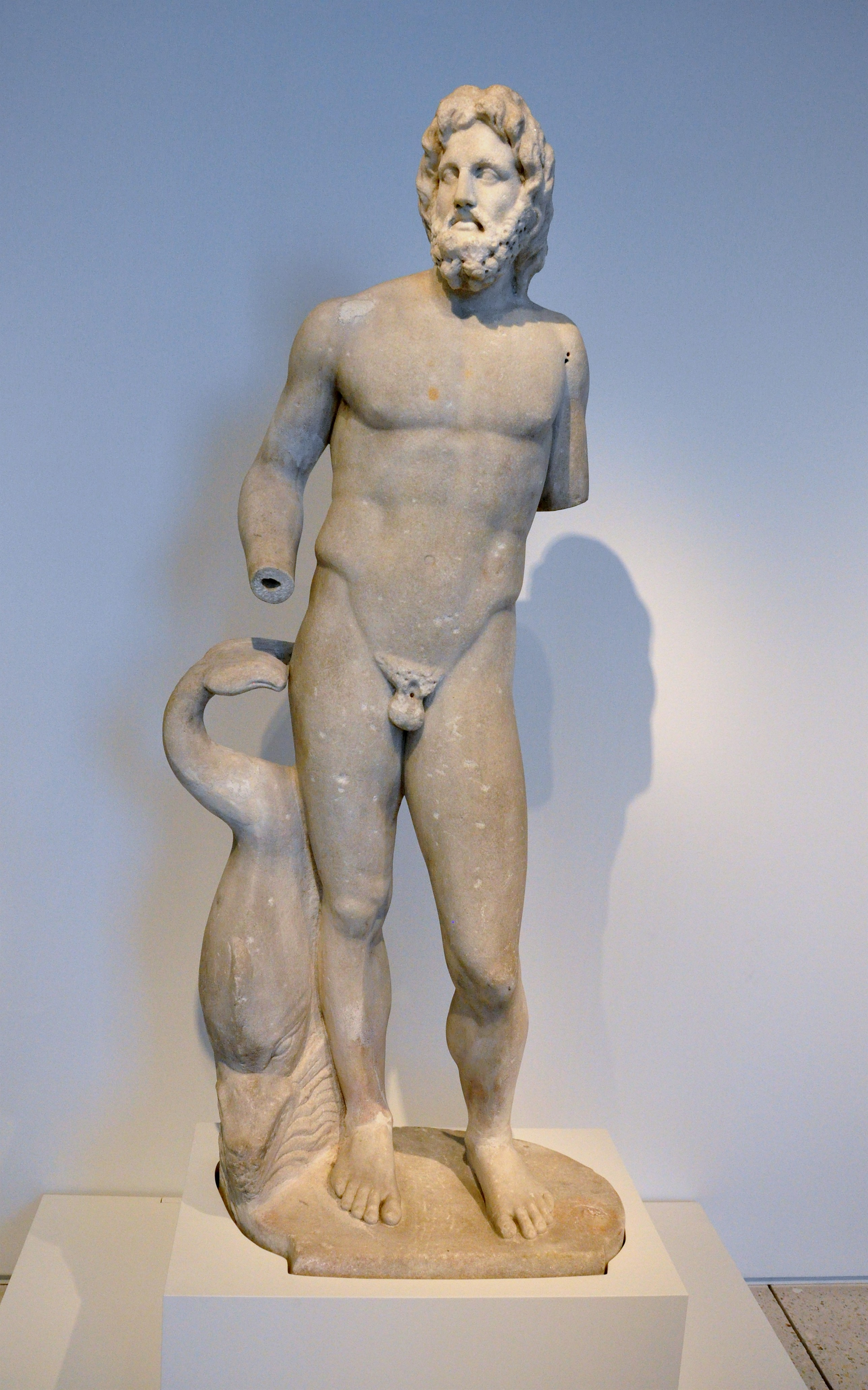
Roman sculpture, Statue of Neptune, 1st Century A.D.

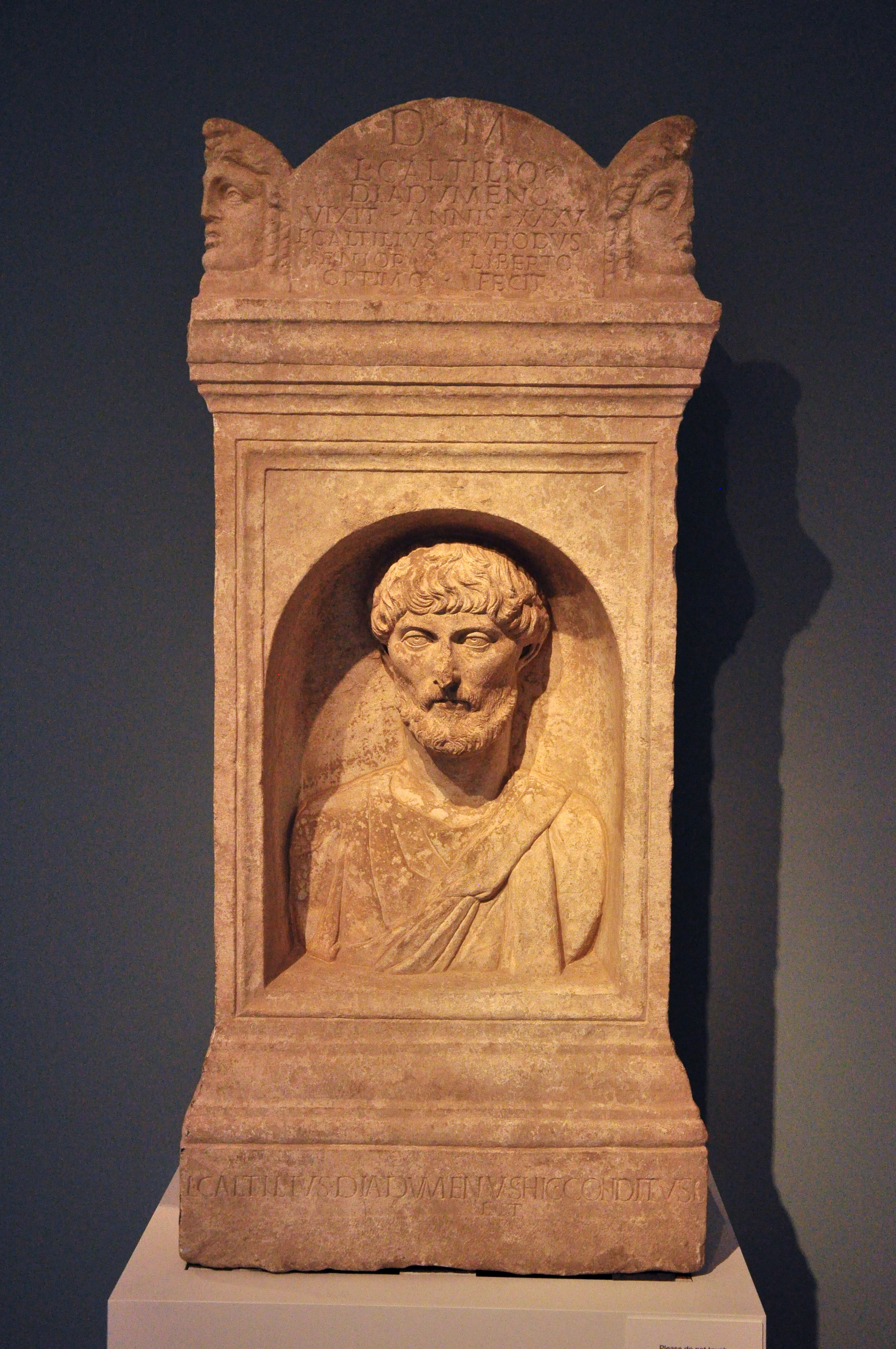
Roman grave altar, Grave of Caltilus Diadumenus, A.D. 140–170
