= Paul Kagan =

American photographer, graphic artist and author (1943–1993)

Paul Kagan (1943–1993) was an American photographer, graphic artist, and author. A photographer, graphic artist and author, Kagan is remembered for the rock concert posters featuring his photographs, and graphics published during San Francisco’s psychedelic Sixties and the book of photographs depicting Utopian communities he published in 1975.

Kagan was born in Chicago in 1943, but his family moved to Los Angeles in the late 1950s. As a teenager, he was active in political protests; by the time he began college at the University of California at Berkeley, he was listed by the House Un-American Activities Committees as one of the country’s most dangerous radicals.

He graduated in 1965 with a degree in history. following graduation he pursued a career as a commercial photographer, magazine art director and television news writer as well as a fine-art photographer. In the late 1960s he photographed the Monterey Pop Festival, the Human Be-In of 1967, and the People’s Park protests of 1969.

== Photography ==
Kagan exhibited his photographs at Stanford University in 1966 and the University of California Extension campus in San Francisco in 1973. He was in a group show at the Light Sound Dimension Gallery in one of the several Rolling Renaissance exhibitions in San Francisco in 1968.

In the late 1960s Kagan shot a series of erotic photographs that were used by designers in rock concert posters. Designers who used his photos included Victor Moscoso and David Smith. These images became some of his most widely known work.

Kagan also designed some posters of his own, including some of his photographs, for 1968 Avalon Ballroom concerts. He worked with Family Dog, a production company in San Francisco run by Chet Helms, which organized concerts. In 1966 Kagan photographed Country Joe and the Fish, and the images were used on four covers for albums released in 1967. Kagan’s photographs appeared in Rolling Stone magazine, the Berkeley Barb and Berkeley Tribe weekly newspapers, and on the cover of Ramparts magazine. They also appeared in the Night Times.

Kagan's photographs were the subject of a retrospective exhibition in 2014 at the World Erotic Art Museum in Miami.

== New World Utopias ==
Around 1970 Kagan began to research and photograph California Utopian communities. This work was supported first by a grant from the National Institute of Mental Health and then by the California Historical Society. Following five years of research, in 1975 Kagan published a book titled New World Utopias: A Photographic History of the Search for Community. The book profiles ten Utopian communities in California, dating from 1870 to 1970, and includes photographs Kagan took when he visited sites of current and former communities. An exhibition of these photographs was mounted at the Oakland Museum in 1975.

New World Utopias was included in the exhibition Sources (incomplete parts) by Martin Beck at 47 Canal, 2020.

By the late 1970s he was working as a photographer with a San Francisco advertising agency, Dailey & Associates, where he won trade group awards for several advertisements featuring his photographs.

Kagan died in New York City in 1993.
