= American School & University =

- Categories: Trade magazine
- Founded: 1929; 97 years ago
- Company: Endeavor Business Media
- Country: United States
- Based in: Philadelphia, Pennsylvania, U S.
- Language: English
- Website: www.asumag.com
- ISSN: 0003-0945

American School & University (AS&U) is a magazine published by Endeavor Business Media that covers the operations of educational facilities, including design and construction of new school buildings, maintenance, and renovation of existing ones, and school building management. The publication is marketed to administrators of primary and secondary schools and tertiary institutions. The publication is based in Philadelphia. Its senior editor is Mike Kennedy.
