= Franck Louissaint =

Haitian painter (1949–2021)

- Born: 22 October 1949; Aquin, Haiti
- Died: 5 February 2021 (aged 71); Pétion-Ville, Haiti
- Occupation: Painter

Franck Louissaint (22 October 1949 – 5 February 2021) was a Haitian painter.

== Biography ==
After his studies at the Lycée Anténor Firmin in Port-au-Prince, Louissaint attended the Centre d’art de Port-au-Prince, where he would subsequently teach. He also taught at the Ecole Nationale des Arts from 1983 until his death.

Louissaint followed a figurative style of artwork with landmarks from around Haiti, both urban and rural. His style was similar to hyperrealism, giving the scenography a very natural look that was common with Dutch artists in the 16th Century.

Franck Louissaint died in Pétion-Ville on 5 February 2021 at the age of 71.
