= Mario Torroella =

Cuban artist and architect

- Born: Mario Jaime Torroella y Martín-Rivero; March 30, 1935; Havana, Cuba
- Education: Dartmouth College, Harvard Graduate School of Design
- Occupations: Artist, architect
- Notable work: Storm Cloud
- Movement: Cuban Expressionism (art), Modernism (architecture)
- Spouse: Isabelle Torroella

Mario Torroella (born March 30, 1935) is a Cuban-American visual artist and architect based in Cambridge, Massachusetts. He is a co-founder of the firm HMFH Architects and a Fellow of the American Institute of Architects. His art is closely associated with the Cuban exile experience and has become well known in the broader international Cuban diaspora.

== Early life ==
=== Background ===
Mario Jaime Torroella y Martín-Rivero was born on March 30, 1935, in Havana's el Vedado neighborhood, then raised in the city of Marianao. His parents, Juan Torroella y Rooney and Graciela Martín-Rivero y Martínez, were both from prominent Cuban families and were educated in the United States. His mother was an artist educated first in the Corcoran School of the Arts and Design in Washington, D.C. and then at Havana's Academy of San Alejandro while his father attended Cornell University and returned to Cuba to become a contractor-architect.

Mario Torroella is the youngest of their three sons, following Juan III, the eldest, and Luis, a Cuban revolutionary who opposed the Castro regime. Like their parents, all three were educated in the United States where they attended Hebron Academy in Maine.

Torroella then attended Dartmouth College where he was influenced by the books of Swiss-French architect Le Corbusier and Swiss architecture critic Sigfried Giedion. He graduated with his Bachelors of Arts in 1957 after which he enrolled in Harvard Graduate School of Design, receiving his master's degree in architecture in 1962.

=== Cuban Revolution ===
Torroella's graduate studies were interrupted by the outbreak of the Cuban Revolution, after which Torroella returned to Cuba to assist the post-Batista revolutionary government, working under architect Frank Martínez in the Ministry of Public Works. Martinez and his wife Cira (later Cira Porta) were well-connected figures in Havana arts and associates of several prominent Cuban and international art and design figures including Walter Gropius, Roberto Estopiñán, and Cundo Bermúdez. Through them Torroella would meet leading members of the Cuban art community including René Portocarrero, Raul Milián, Eduardo Abela, Hugo Consuegra, Estopiñán and others. Torroella and Martinez worked on several ambitious though unrealized public works projects, including the new revolutionary government Film Studios, the National Aquarium, and public housing for agricultural workers.

During this period his brother, Luis Torroella, an economist and revolutionary who had worked against Batista and was part of the 26th of July Movement, headed the Ministry of Finance's table of economists at the age of 27. As Fidel Castro's regime became overtly aligned to Communism and under the Soviet sphere of influence, Torroella, his brother Luis, and the Martínezes each became involved in the clandestine counterrevolution against Castro, with each eventually resigning from their posts. Mario Torroella had come under suspicion from the Castro regime amidst widespread government crackdowns on dissent, leading Torroella to re-enroll in Harvard, leaving Cuba permanently on September 13, 1960.

His brother Luis sent his daughter and American wife to the United States while he remained in Cuba to coordinate with Martínez and his wife Cira. Luis Torroella was eventually captured by Castro's forces in Santiago de Cuba, after which he was imprisoned for one year in Havana's La Cabaña before being sent back to Santiago for his execution in October 1962.

=== Josep Lluís Sert mentorship ===
Upon returning to the Harvard Graduate School of Design, Torroella studied under prominent Spanish architect and HGSD Dean, Josep Lluís Sert, a close associate of several leading art and design figures of the 20th century, including Le Corbusier, Pablo Picasso, Alexander Calder, Joan Miró and others. The two bonded over their Cuban and Catalonian heritage and an admiration for the arts, leading Sert to become an influential mentor to Torroella that helped shape his early career.

Following Torroella's graduation in 1962, he was hired by Sert to work in his architecture firm, Torroella's first private sector architecture role in the United States. He remained with Sert through the early 1960s, during which time he also met his future wife Isabelle Berangere Gambier, a French citizen who went on to study fashion design in Paris. Torroella also continued to paint alongside his architecture career and began exhibiting his work. When he resigned from Sert's firm later in the decade to pursue other opportunities, Torroella gifted Sert one of his early works at Sert's residence in the presence of Calder.

== Architecture career ==
Torroella is a Modernist known for his unique approach of integrating color into public buildings in a departure from the standard neutral tones, as well as an emphasis on human scale as espoused by Le Corbusier and Josep Lluis Sert.

In 1969 Torroella co-founded HMFH Architects with Harvard classmates. As a co-founder, principal, and design director, he led the firm to win several architecture awards, including the William Caudill Citation from the American School & University Magazine, as well as four Walter Taylor Awards from the AASA and the AIA.

In 1986 Torroella won the CINTAS Fellowship in architecture. In 1989 he designed his private residence, The Torroella House, which would go on to win the Boston Society of Architects’ 1993 Excellence in Design Award.

Another high-profile Torroella project is the Coastal Cement Corporation facility located within the Boston Marine Industrial Park in Boston, Massachusetts. The facility spans 14,000 square feet of office space and a bagging facility, as well as four large-scale storage silos. The silos make up the most noticeable portion of the complex with each reaching 120 feet, weighing 7,000 metric tons, and collectively holding 41,000 tons of cement. In addition to its scale, the project was noteworthy for showcasing Torroella’s signature use of color to offset Modernism’s tendency toward imposing and industrial aesthetics. Completed in 1989, Torroella led the HMFH Architects team as Design Director and utilized an unconventional application of vivid red accent coloring to add vibrancy and contrast the widespread gray of the concrete. Another departure from most industrial facilities was the extensive use of landscaping, which also added natural greens to the color scheme. These elements drew significant attention to the project, earning it the 1990 New England Regional Council/AIA Honor Award for New Commercial Construction, the Washington Waterfront Center’s national Excellence on the Waterfront Award, as well as the Excellence in Concrete Building Design Award from the Portland Cement Association & the Association of General Contractors. The project was also covered by Architectural Record and reviewed in detail by The Boston Globe which described it as “a beautiful, bold composition” that “Manifests raw power, but also surprising delicacy [...] with much of the drama and sculptural power of the great industrial buildings of America’s past.” The project was also mentioned in the 1994 book Waterfronts: Cities Reclaim Their Edge.

In 2013 Torroella became a member of the College of Fellows of the American Institute of Architecture.

== Art career ==
Torroella is largely self-taught in the arts, though he had been influenced by repeated exposure. His first contact with the arts came from his mother, Graciela Martín-Rivero y Martínez, an artist, who taught him techniques of watercolor and oil painting. He began painting informally as a child at the age of five under the broad guidance of his mother and continued to evolve in a self-taught method throughout his career.

Following his return to the United States and graduation from the Harvard Graduate School of Design, Torroella began exhibiting his art in 1962 following an invitation by the prominent Puerto Rican art critic, professor, and El Mirador Azul co-founder Ernesto Jaime Ruiz de la Mata at the museum of the University of Puerto Rico, Río Piedras. Torroella has since participated in over 40 individual and group exhibitions throughout his career in the United States and Europe. His artwork has been exhibited in Harvard University, North Eastern University, the University of Massachusetts, the Barcelona International Art Forum, El Museo de América in Madrid, and the Menton Biennale.

=== Select works ===
Works by Mario Torroella

=== Selected solo exhibitions ===
As an individual artist, Torroella's paintings and tapestries have been exhibited throughout the United States and France in over 15 one-man exhibitions since 1962.

They include:

- 2018 Larkin Gallery, Provincetown, Massachusetts, USA
- 2009 Boston Arts Academy, Boston, Massachusetts, USA
- 2003 Ars Atelier, Union City, New Jersey, USA
- 2003 Agustin Gainza Gallery, Miami, Florida, USA
- 2001 La Galerie Absidial, Vannes, France
- 1999 Gallery Bershad, Somerville, Massachusetts, USA
- 1996 Harvard University, Cambridge, Massachusetts, USA
- 1993 La Galeria Marrozzini, San Juan, Puerto Rico
- 1988 La Galerie Absidial, Nantes, France
- 1986 The Copley Society, Boston, Massachusetts, USA
- 1984 Longy School of Music, Cambridge, Massachusetts, USA
- 1973 Boston City Hall, Boston, Massachusetts, USA
- 1967 The Pan American Society, Boston, Massachusetts, USA
- 1967 La Casa del Arte, San Juan, Puerto Rico
- 1962 The Museum of the University of Puerto Rico, Rio Piedras, Puerto Rico

=== Selected group exhibitions ===
Torroella has participated in over 30 group exhibitions throughout the United States, France, Spain, and Switzerland since 1967.

They include:

- 2024 Forbidden Fruit, Wilzig Museum, Miami Beach, Florida, USA
- 2016 Villa Victoria Cultural Center, Boston, Massachusetts, USA
- 2010 Two painters, one sculptor, three visions. Atrium on the Brook, New Jersey, USA
- 2006 Florida International University and Art Basel in Miami Beach, Florida, USA
- 2006 Cuban Cultural Center of New York, New York, USA
- 2005 Museo de America, Madrid, Spain
- 2002 La Galerie Editart, Geneva, Switzerland
- 1998 La Galeria Raices, San Juan, Puerto Rico
- 1994 Cuban Graphics at the Miami Herald, Miami, Florida, USA
- 1992 Javier Lumbreras Fine Art, Coral Gables, Florida, USA
- 1992 Cambridge Multicultural Art Center, Cambridge, Massachusetts, USA
- 1992 La Casa de Cuba, San Juan, Puerto Rico
- 1991 Bunker Hill Community College, Boston, Massachusetts, USA
- 1991 Chandler Gallery, Provincetown, Massachusetts, USA
- 1991 The Jamaica Plains Multicultural Arts Center, Boston, Massachusetts, USA
- 1990 Bank of Boston Gallery, Boston, Massachusetts, USA
- 1990 The Elite Fine Arts Gallery, Coral Gables, Florida, USA
- 1990 The Kimberly Gallery, Washington, D.C., USA
- 1989 Barcelona International Art Forum, Barcelona, Spain
- 1987 North Eastern University Art Gallery, Boston, Massachusetts, USA
- 1986 University of Massachusetts Boston Art Gallery, Massachusetts, USA
- 1984 The Copley Society of Boston, Boston, Massachusetts, USA
- 1976 The 11th Menton Biennale, Menton, France
- 1974 The 10th Menton Biennale, Menton, France
- 1967 Commonwealth of Massachusetts Council on the Arts and Humanities Artists Exhibition, Boston, Massachusetts, USA
- 1967 The Museum of Fine Arts, Ponce, Puerto Rico

== Style ==
In architecture, Torroella is a Modernist influenced by Le Corbusier, Sigfried Giedion, and Josep Lluís Sert. He is known for his unique approach of integrating color into public buildings, such as schools, in a departure from the standard neutrality of whites and grays, as well as an emphasis on human scale.

In his art Torroella is an Expressionist. His artwork is largely abstract with an emphasis on vivid, saturated color and primal forms. Torroella draws influence from the work of Joan Miró, Diego Velázquez, Francisco Goya, Max Beckmann, Oskar Kokoschka, Edvard Munch, as well as traditional African art. His mediums include oil on canvas, ink and gouache, and tapestry.

The themes and subjects explored in Torroella's work include alienation, violence, beauty, sorrow, mysticism, spirituality, and death. He utilizes creative analysis and social criticism as a means of expression. Examples include his exploration of the concept of justice as well as the tension between superficial aesthetic principles and deeper moral principles. These themes are represented abstractly in Torroella's work through layered symbolism.

In explaining his art, Torroella has stated “expression and feeling is what my art is about.” He has also explained the role of his background as an influence in much of his work, stating “I paint in order to communicate and/or alleviate an alienation brought about by coming from where extreme beauty and natural abundance have been the backdrop for a society which has often erupted in self-violence, thus causing great sorrow to all concerned” in reference to his Cuban cultural and upbringing, as well as his experiences with the Cuban Revolution and its lingering impact on his life in the United States.

== Recognition and legacy ==
Torroella has become a regarded figure in both art and architecture over the course of his career since the 1960s.

He co-founded the firm HMFH Architects and with them has won the American School & University’s William Caudill Citation and four Walter Taylor Awards from the AASA and the AIA. Before retiring in 2016 at the age of 81, he served as a HMFH principal as well as Director of Design.

Torroella’s individual architecture recognitions include the 1986 CINTAS Fellowship in architecture, the Boston Society of Architects’ 1993 Excellence in Design Award for his private residence, The Torroella House, as well as membership in the College of Fellows of the American Institute of Architecture as of 2013. He was profiled by The Boston Globe for his work on The Torroella House and has also been listed as a notable architect and artist by Marquis Who's Who.

Torroella's career in both art and architecture has been covered in several books and publications, including Catálago General de Artistas Iberoamericanos 1900-1990, Signes, Numero Neuf by Luc Vidal (1988), Lugares donde detener la Mirada, en homenaje a Maria Zambrano (2005), Cuban-American Art in Miami, Exile, identity and the Neo-Baroque (2004), and Art of Cuba in Exile (1987). Additionally, the books Entre Dos Luces (2003), Olorun Rainbow (2001), and Transiciones, Migraciones (1993) feature his artwork on their covers.

He has also been widely covered by various media outlets throughout his career, including the newspapers The Boston Globe, The Miami Herald, El Nuevo Herald, The Charlotte Observer, and The Lowell Sun. Additionally, Torroella has also been covered by a number of magazines including Architect Magazine, Linden Lane Magazine, Progressive Architecture Magazine, Architectural Record, The Washingtonian Latin American Art, Art Now, and La Nuez, revista de arte y literatura. Torroella has also been featured on Ars Atelier City Magazine, including two lead cover stories: “Mario Torroella” (2012) and "Essential Torroella” (2014).

In 1992 Torroella as his artwork were prominently covered on the “Mosaics in Boston” news feature broadcast on Boston's Channel 56.

In 2013 he was interviewed and featured in the documentary Josep Lluis Sert, A Nomadic Dream released to commemorate the 30th anniversary of Sert's death.

His work is featured in several prominent public and private fine art collections including those of the Josep Lluís Sert, Cira Porta, and Marta Permuy as well as Harvard University, the University of Puerto Rico, the Museum of Contemporary Art of Velez-Malaga, and the Fundacion Maria Zambrano in Andalucia, Spain. In 2024, Torroella’s piece Storm Cloud was accepted into the permanent collection of the Alvin Sherman Library, one of the largest libraries in the state of Florida, as part of the inauguration of the Marta Permuy Legacy Collection. The piece was notable for already having a public profile after having been previously featured on the cover of Ars Atelier magazine in 2012. The library’s permanent collection also features work by other prominent artists including Dale Chihuly, Salvador Dalí, and Peter Max. In 2025, Torroella was accepted into the permanent collection of the Museum of Fine Arts St. Petersburg with the work Dos Palmeras Con Fondo Rojo from 2017.

== Personal life ==
Torroella met his wife Isabelle in 1963 in Cambridge during which time both lacked formal US citizenship. Torroella had internally displaced persons (IDPs) protection owing to his unique circumstances with Cuba, though as a French citizen Isabelle was required to return to France and they would remain in contact through correspondences and occasional visits. They married in 1971 while she was a fashion designer for Christian Dior, after which Torroella had attained dual US-French citizenship. By the end of the decade Isabelle served as Head of the Art Department for the School of Fashion Design (SFD) in Boston and featured in the American Art Directory. After retiring from her Paris fashion career, Isabelle Torroella is now an author. In 2004 she released the book Dare Asking Your Dreams for Answers, through Trafford Publishing.

The couple has two children: stylist and fashion editor Eugénie Torroella and writer Pablo Torroella.

Mario Torroella's eldest brother, Juan A. Torroella III (also known as John Torroella in the US), graduated from the U.S. Naval Academy in Annapolis, Maryland in 1955. Upon returning to Cuba he was employed by Esso (now Exxon) in Havana until the Cuban Revolution, when he transferred and relocated permanently to the United States. He remained with Exxon for the duration of his career until retiring in the early 2000s as an executive of their International Division four decades later, after which he relocated to the Brickell area of Miami. He died in 2010.

Mario Torroella's second elder brother, Luis, graduated from Dartmouth College and worked in Havana as a prominent economist, eventually heading the Ministry of Finance's table of economists. He later joined the counterrevolution and was captured by Castro's forces in Santiago de Cuba, after which he was imprisoned for one year in Havana's La Cabaña prison before being returned to Santiago for execution in October 1962.

== Ancestry ==
Both of Mario Torroella's parents come from prominent Cuban families.

In his mother's family, his maternal grandfather is Antonio Martín-Rivero y Aguiar, a leading Cuban minister and diplomat from the early years of the Cuban Republic. Throughout his career he was a Plenipotentiary Minister and one of the first Cuban ambassadors to the United States in Washington, D.C. as well as ambassador to Mexico, Italy and Holland. He was included in the journal Historia de familias cubanas. Antonio Martin-Rivero's father, Pedro Martin Rivero, was a leader of the Cuban Independence movement and owned a pro-independence newspaper in Havana that was banished by the Spanish government, causing him to emigrate to Philadelphia. There he came in contact with José Martí, then a journalist in New York, and the two coordinated on the movement for the independence of Cuba. Martin-Rivero also participated in the 1868 “Grito de Yara.” More distantly, Mario Torroella's mother is descendant of Diego Velázquez de Cuéllar, the first Governor of Cuba.

Torroella's father, Juan Torroella y Rooney, is of Spanish and Irish ancestry. He was sent to the United States early in the Republic of Cuba's history by his father, Juan Torroella I, a Spaniard from Cataluña. He attended Cornell University before returning to Cuba to practice architecture. Torroella y Rooney's mother, Mario Torroella's paternal grandmother, was Irish and served as governess of the children of the influential Cuban businessman Vicente Martínez-Ybor, who started the tobacco industry in the region of Tampa now known as Ybor City. As governess, she was charged with the care of Martínez-Ybor's children, initially in their New York City residence shortly after she first arrived to the area from Ireland. She became acquainted with Juan Torroella I, a close friend of Martínez-Ybor, in Tampa and after their eventual marriage they settled permanently in Havana.
