= José Ramón Díaz Alejandro =

Cuban painter and writer

Ramon Alejandro
- José Ramón Díaz Alejandro
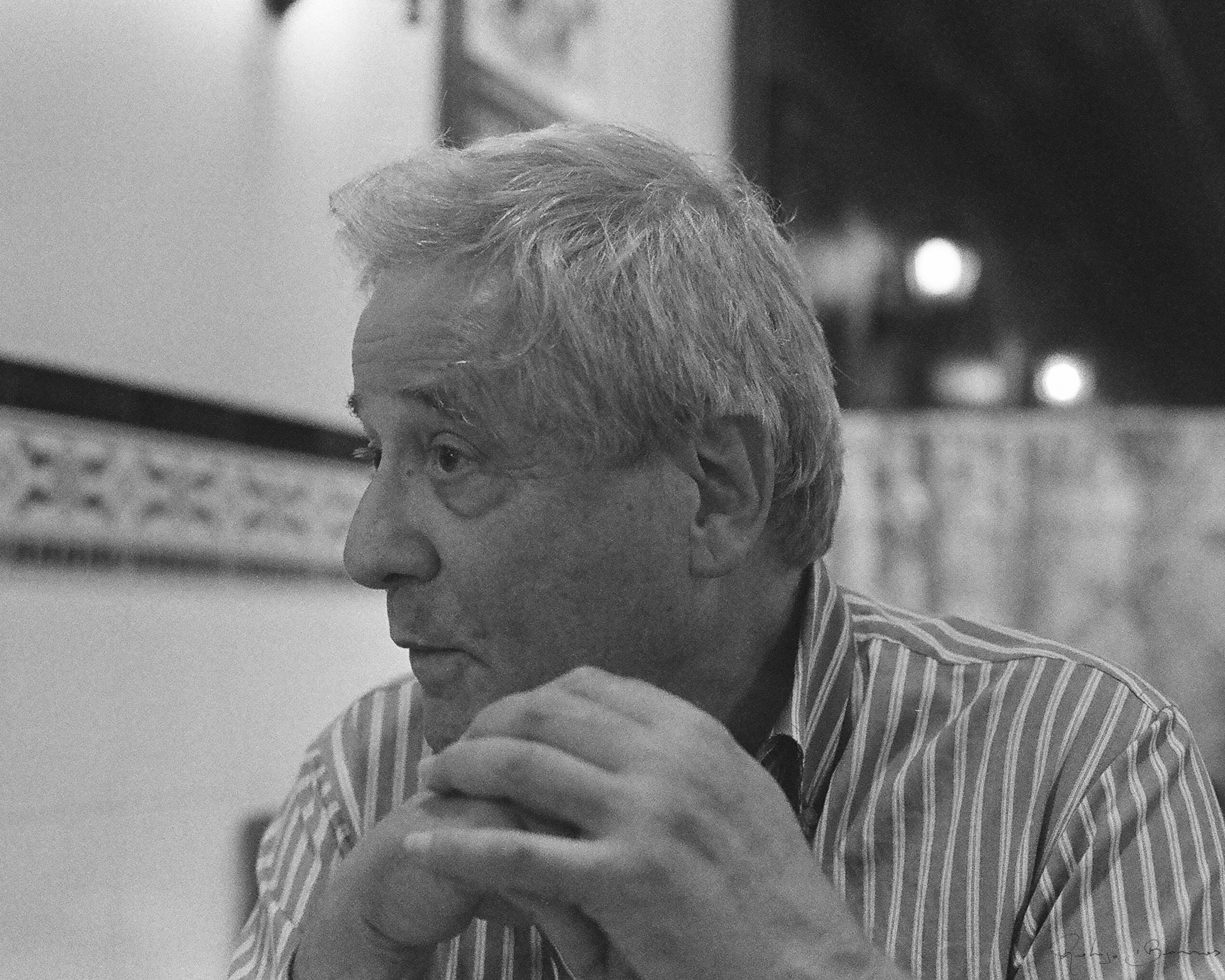
- Born: José Ramón Díaz Alejandro; February 16, 1943 (age 82); Havana, Cuba
- Known for: Painting; writing
- Awards: Cintas Foundation Fellowship (1969–1971)

José Ramón Díaz Alejandro, painting and writing under the name of Ramon Alejandro, (born February 1943, Havana, Cuba) is a Cuban painter and writer who has lived in exile in Argentina, Uruguay and Paris, France. He now lives in Miami, Florida.

== Individual exhibitions ==
He began his artistic life in 1969 with the exhibition Alejandro. Galerie Maya, Brussels, Belgium. In 1971 the exhibit Alejandro was seen at the Galerie Jacques Desbrière, Paris. Later in 1987 the same show was presented at the Galerie Du Dragon, Paris.

== Collective exhibitions ==
He has been involved in several collective projects. In 1965 his work was shown as part of the Exposición de La Habana at the Galería Latinoamericana, Casa de las Américas, La Habana, Cuba. In 1967 Mostra Grafica Latinoamericana was seen at the Istituto Italo Latinoamericano, Rome, Italy. In 1984 he participated in the Foire Internationale d’Art Contemporain (FIAC) at the Grand Palais in Paris. In 2001, he was selected for the exhibition New Art of Cuba, seen at the José Alonso Fine Arts Gallery in Miami, Florida.

== Awards ==
From 1969 to 1971 he obtained the Cintas Foundation Fellowship, in New York.

== Collections ==
His work is part of the permanent collections of:

- Bibliothèque Municipale d’Angers, Angers, France, Cabinet des Estampes
- Bibliothèque Nationale de France, París, France
- San Diego Museum of Art, San Diego, California
