= Mario Carreño =

Cuban-Chilean painter (1913–1999)

- Born: Mario Carreño y Morales; May 24, 1913; Havana, Cuba
- Died: December 20, 1999 (aged 86)
- Education: Academia de San Alejandro; Real Academia de Bellas Artes de San Fernando; École des Arts appliqués; Académie Julian
- Known for: Painting
- Notable work: Cortadores de Caña, Danza Afro-Cubana, Fuego en el Batey, La Siesta, El Azulejo, Equinocio, Los Olvidados, Mar y Luna, Atardecer de Nostalgia, La Caída de los Grandes Mitos
- Style: Nativist-baroque, Cubism, Geometric abstraction, Surrealism
- Movement: Orígenes movement

Mario Carreño y Morales, better known as Mario Carreño (May 24, 1913 – December 20, 1999) was a Cuban-Chilean painter.

== Biography ==
Morales was born on May 24, 1913 in Havana, Cuba. He studied painting at the Academia de San Alejandro, Havana from 1925 until 1926. In 1934, he studied at the Real Academia de Bellas Artes de San Fernando, Madrid, Spain. In 1937 he was a student at the Ecole des Arts appliqués, Paris, France and that same year, at the Académie Julian, Paris, France. Among his teachers and contemporaries were Pablo Picasso and Jaime Colson who provided him formal and stylistic guidance which he brought with him upon his return to Cuba. Circa 1935, he painted a mural in Havana with David Alfaro Siqueiros, which was later destroyed. He was an original member of the Origenes (nativist-baroque) movement. In 1944 he was one of several painters displayed in the New York Museum of Modern Art's-- Exhibition of Modern Cuban Painters. Works such as "Cortadores de Caña", "Danza Afro-Cubana", and "Fuego en el Batey" characterize the nativist-baroque style of this period, while at the same time, paintings such as "La Siesta" and "El Azulejo", evince classical and cubist inspiration. In the 1950s his style evolved towards geometric abstraction with works such as "Equinocio", and in the 1960s towards a poetic style, which could be described as surreal-metaphysical. This latter period is represented by works such as "Los Olvidados", "Mar y Luna", "Atardecer de Nostalgia" and "La Caida de Los Grandes Mitos". Besides a prolific output he also taught painting at numerous institutions such as the New School for Social Research in New York City, the Escuela de San Alejandro in Havana, Cuba, and the Universidad Catolica of Santiago, Chile.

== Solo exhibitions ==
- 1930 – "Mario Carreño", Salón de Merás y Rico, Havana, Cuba
- 1947 – "Carreño: Recent Paintings", Perls Galleries, New York City
- 1978 – "Mario Carreño. Pinturas", Museo de Bellas Artes de Caracas, Caracas, Venezuela
- 2000 – "Exposición en Homenaje a Mario Carreño", Galería de Arte Patricia Ready, Santiago, Chile

== Group exhibitions ==
- 1932 – "Exposición Única de Pintores y Escultores Cubanos", Lyceum, Havana, Cuba
- 1943 – "The Latin American Collection", Museum of Modern Art, New York City
- 1944 – " Exhibition of Modern Cuban Painters, March 17, 1944, Museum of Modern Art, MoMA, New York City
- 1951 – I São Paulo Art Biennial, São Paulo, Brazil
- 1952 – XXVI Venice Biennale, Venice, Italy
- 1953 – II São Paulo Art Biennial, São Paulo, Brazil

== Awards ==
- 1956 – Guggenheim International Award, New York City
- 1982 – National Prize of Art of Chile, Santiago, Chile
- 1987 – Cintas Foundation Fellowship, New York City

== Collections ==
Many of his pieces are in the permanent collections of:

- Carrol Reece Museum, East Tennessee State University, Johnson City, Tennessee
- Metropolitan Museum and Art Center, Coral Gables, Florida
- Colección D.O.P. by DOP Foundation, Paris
- Museo de Bellas Artes, Santiago, Chile,
- Museo Nacional de Bellas Artes de La Habana, Havana, Cuba
- Museum of Modern Art, New York City
- International Business Machine, New York City
- Comesana Family, Havana, Cuba
- Muscarelle Museum of Art, Williamsburg, Virginia
- Art Museum of the Americas, Washington, D.C.

== Selected bibliography ==
- Alden Jewell, Edward. "Carreño's Painting." The New York Times, New York, U.S.A., September, 1947.
- Blanc, Giulio V. "Mario Carreño: A Retrospective." cat. Mario Carreño: A Retrospective, Sotheby’s Latin American Painting, Sotheby’s. La Puerta del Sol, Coral Gables [illus.], unpaginated, U.S.A., January 4-6, 1995.*
- Boullier, Renée. "Carreño." Candide, Paris, France, Mai, 1962.
- Brandao, Aurasil. "Carreño en la Bienal de Sâo Paulo." A Noite, Brazil, October, 1951.
- Carpentier, Alejo. "Reencuentro en el Tiempo." El Universal, Caracas, Venezuela, 1957.
- Casamayor, Enrique. "Literatura Pictórica Antillana en el Pintor Cubano Mario Carreño." Cuadernos Hispanoamericanos, Madrid, No. 17, Spain, September, 1950.
- Castellanos, Orlando. "Mario Carreño. Pintura y Vida [interview]." Unión, Havana, Vol. 7, No. 18, pp. 90–96, CUBA, January-March, 1995.
- Cockcroft, Eva Sperling. "Los Estados Unidos y el Arte Latinoamericano de Compromiso Social." cat. El Espíritu Latinoamericano: Arte y Artistas en los Estados Unidos, 1920-1970, The Bronx Museum of Arts, New York, [illus.], pp. 191–192, 199, U.S.A., September 29/1988-January 29/1989.
- Cruz, Isabel. El Arte en Chile. Ed. Biblioteca Antártica, Santiago, Chile, 1987.
- Darie, Sandú. "Mario Carreño en la Aventura Plástica de este Siglo." cat. Carreño, 1950 1957, Museo Nacional de Bellas Artes, Havana [illus.], 21 pp., CUBA, February, 1957.*
- Elgar, Frank. "Carreño." Carrefour, Paris, France, Mai 3, 1962.
- Frost, Rosamond. "Mario Carreño." ArtNews, New York, [illus.], p. 43, U.S.A., March 15, 1941.
- Jones, Catherine. "Cuban Artist Gives Color." The Oregonian, Portland, Oregon [illus.], p. 3, Sección 6, U.S.A., January 14, 1945.
- Karvaly, Imre. "El Pintor Carreño." Revista Humboldt, No. 38, GERMANY, 1969. KEMPER RILEY, Maude. "Carreño Seen in New York." The Art Digest, New York, U.S.A., March, 1944.
- Karvaly, Imre. "Un Moderno Intérprete de las Culturas de Indios Cubanos." The Art Digest, New York, U.S.A., May 1, 1951.
- Krasne, Belle. "The Accomplished Facts of Cuba's Carreño." The Art Digest, New York, p. 14, U.S.A., February, 1950.
- Lopez Oliva, Manuel. "Nuevo Encuentro con Mario Carreño." Granma, Havana, CUBA, May 26, 1993.
- Martinez, Juan A. "Mario Carreño, Mariano Rodríguez and Cuban Modern Painting." cat. Christie's Part I, New York, U.S.A., May, 1995.
- McBride, Henry. "Carreño." ArtNews, New York, U.S.A., 1947.
- Michel, Jacques. "Carreño." Le Monde, Paris, France, April 27, 1962.
- Neruda, Pablo. "M. Carreño." cat. Galería Central de Arte, Santiago, Chile, November, 1970.
- Preston, Stuart. "Carreño's Painting." The New York Times, New York, U.S.A., January 29, 1950.
- Salpeter, Harry. "Carreño the Cubanist." Esquire, Chicago, Illinois, [illus.], pp. 74-75, 170, U.S.A., September, 1944.
- Seuphor, Michel. "M. Carreño." Diccionario de la Pintura Abstracta, Buenos Aires, Argentina, 1964.
- Štěpánek, Pavel. "Carreño." Výtvarný život, Prague, Czechoslovakia, November, 1966.
- Szyszlo, Fernando de. "Un Pintor Cubano." La Nación, Lima, Peru, June 14, 1947.
- Szyszlo, Fernando de. "El Pintor Carreño." Las Moradas, Lima, Vol. II, No. 4, pp. 65–67, Peru, April, 1948.
- Zendegui, Guillermo de. "El Cosmos Luminoso de Carreño." Americas, Washington, D.C., U.S.A., 1977.
