= World Erotic Art Museum =

Art museum in Florida, United States

Coordinates: 25.783295°N 80.132102°W

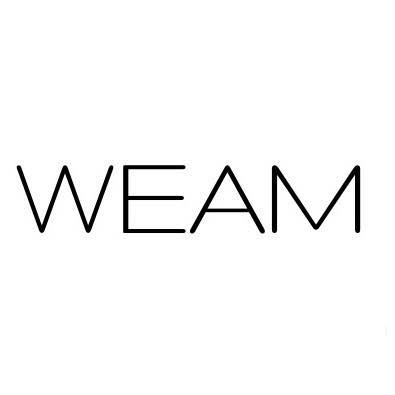

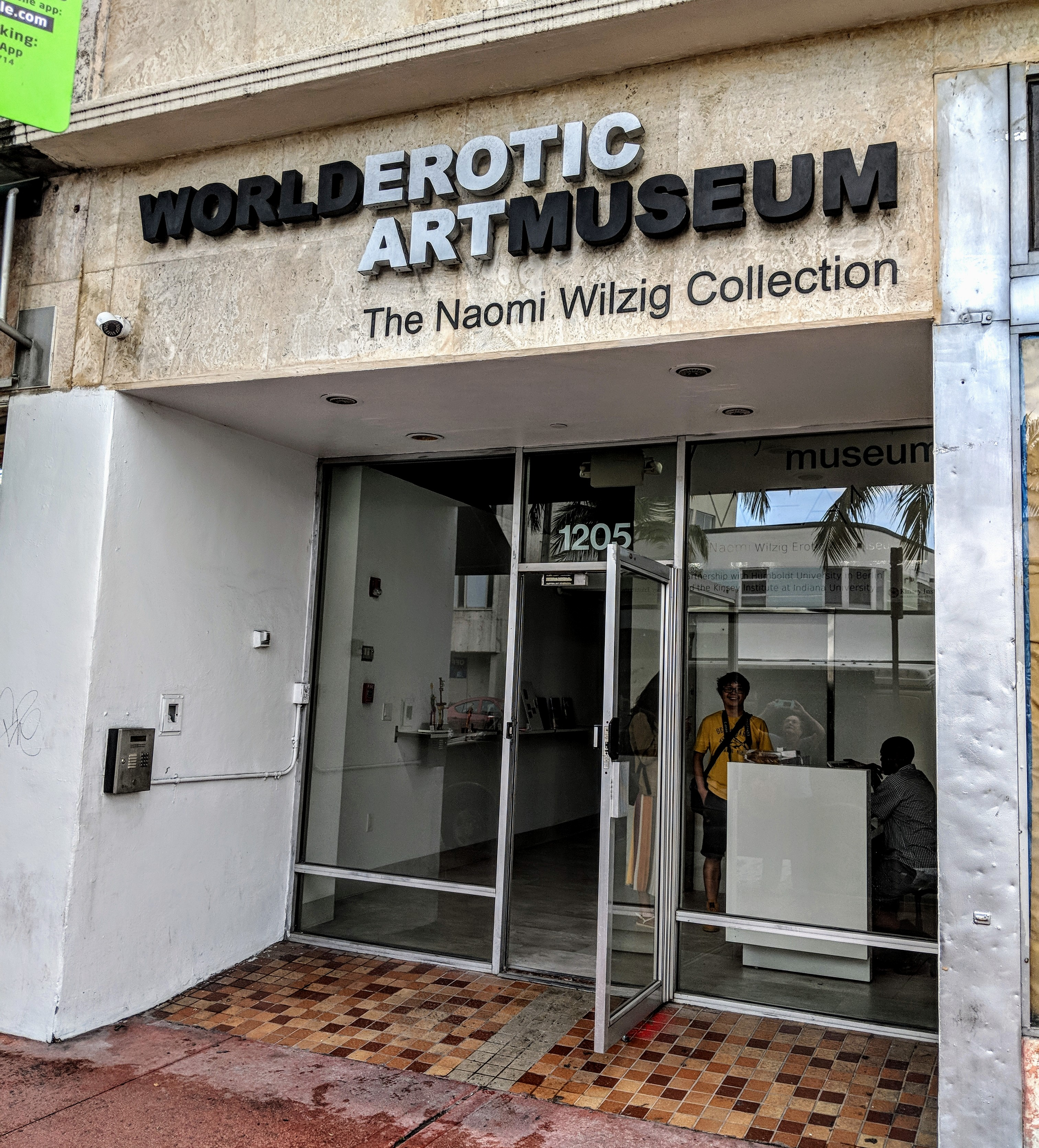
- Established: 2005
- Location: 1205 Washington Avenue; Miami Beach, Florida, United States
- Director: Helmut Schuster
- Owner: Wilzig Family
- Website: www.weam.com

The World Erotic Art Museum is a museum, library, and education think tank for erotic art, located in the Art Deco District of Miami Beach, Florida, United States. It contains the collection of Naomi Wilzig.

== Collection ==
The collection includes sculptures, drawings, paintings, and photographs. The collection ranges from folk art to the work of famous artists. The Museum shows artwork from artists like Rembrandt, Picasso, Salvador Dalí, Fernando Botero as well as Robert Mapplethorpe, Paul Kagan, Helmut Newton and Bunny Yeager to name just a few out of more than 4000.

== Exhibitions ==
In 2011 WEAM premiered the first US exhibition of rare erotic Rembrandt etchings belonging to the Barony of Fulwood Trust, the exhibition was curated by the Baron of Fulwood and Dirleton. In 2012 the curator Helmut Schuster arranged the first solo show of Helmut Newton in Florida in cooperation with the MDM in Salzburg.

== Gallery ==
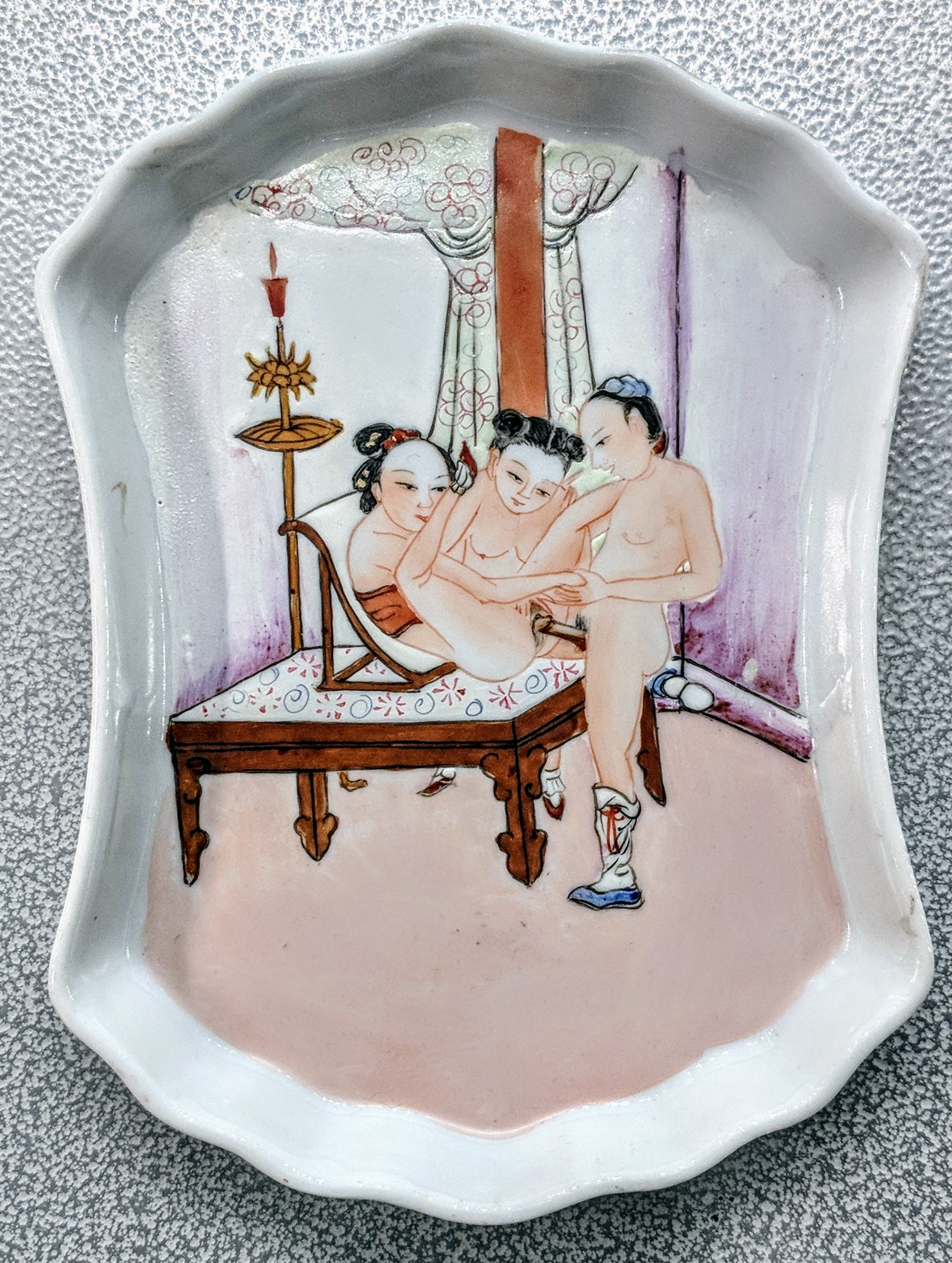
A Chinese porcelain plate, c. 1900, depicting a man having sexual intercourse with a woman with bound feet.

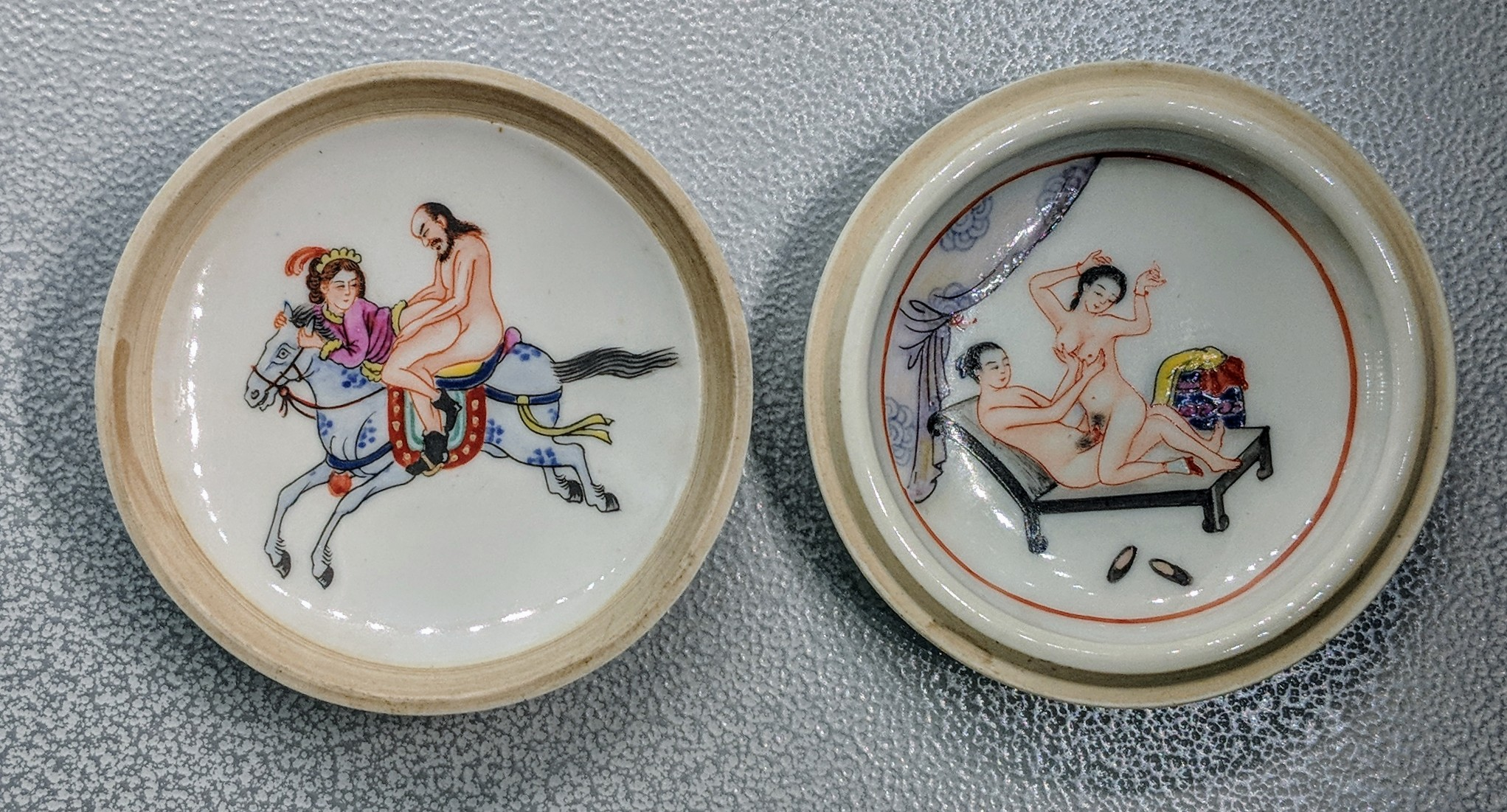
A covered Chinese porcelain plate, c. 1900, showing two scenes of couples having sexual intercourse, one on horseback

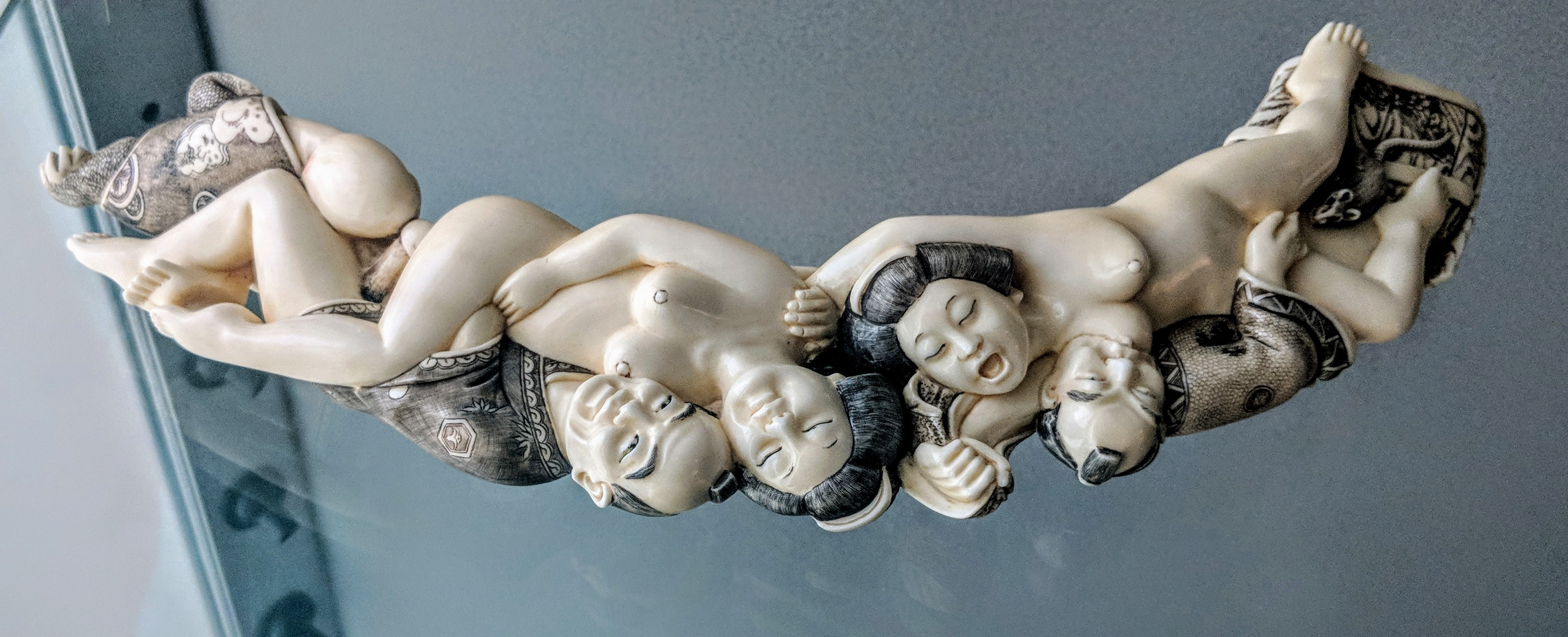
An erotic Japanese carving of an ivory tusk, c. 1900

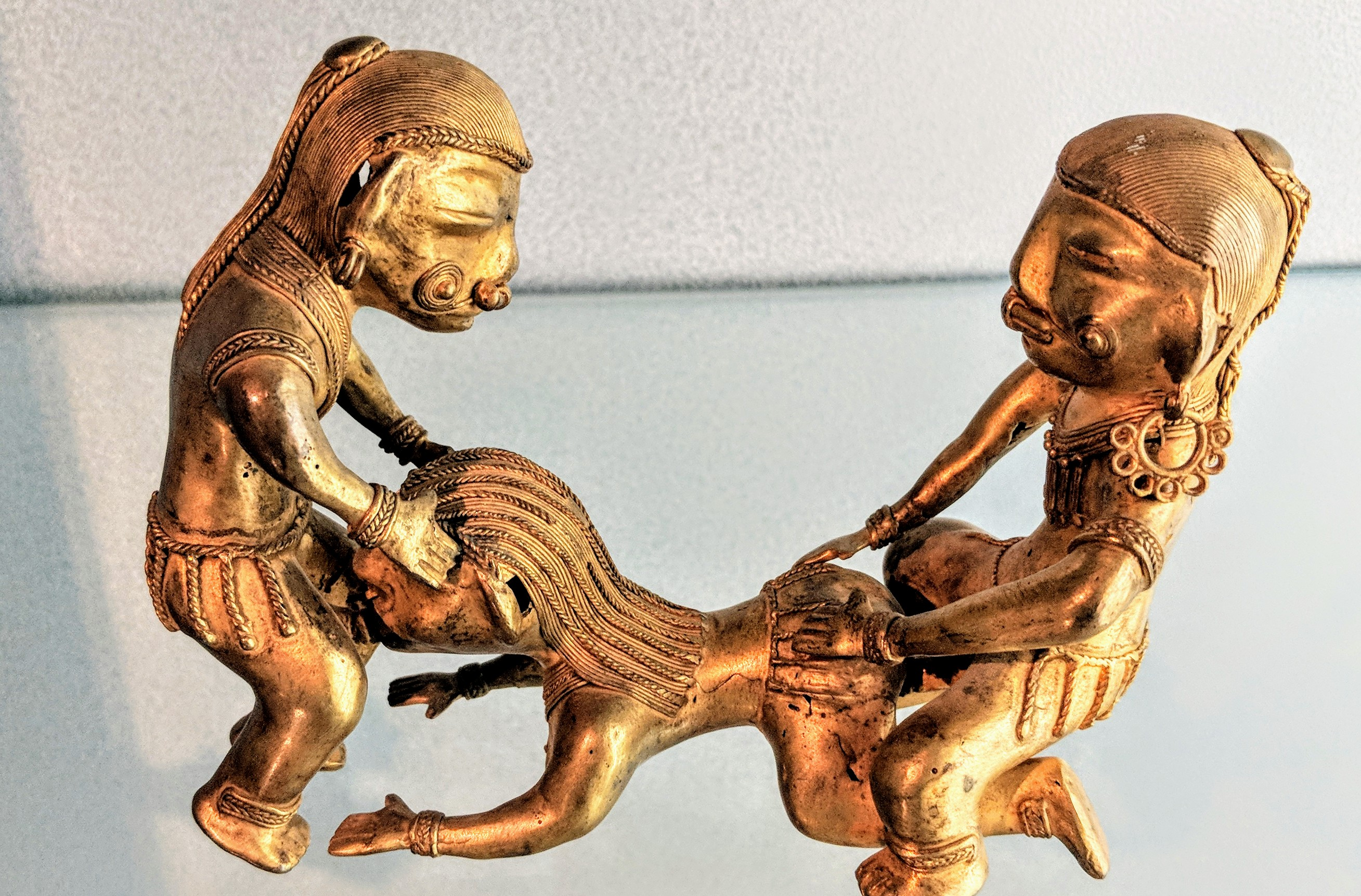
A pre-Columbian figurine from the Tairona culture, using the Tumbaga metalworking technique

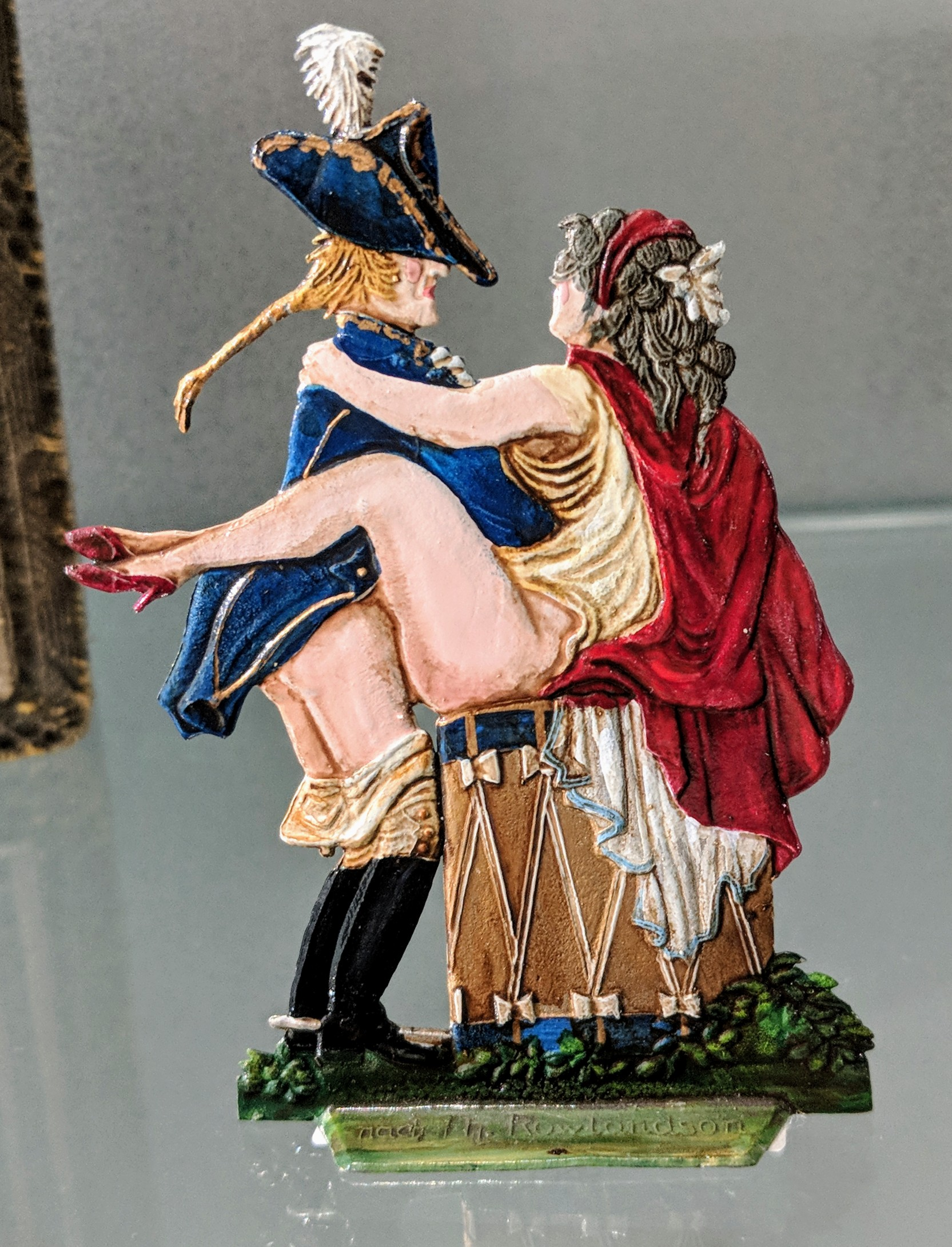
French painted metal figurine, c 1900, showing a Chevalier seducing his mistress on a campaign drum
