= List of Seton Hall Preparatory School alumni =

Alumni of Seton Hall Preparatory School

This is a list of notable Seton Hall Preparatory School alumni. This includes graduates and non-graduate former students of Seton Hall Prep.

== Military ==
- Admiral Robert J. Kelly (born 1938, class of 1955), former Commander-in-Chief of the U.S. Pacific Fleet
- John P. Washington (1908–1943), Army chaplain who was one of the Four Chaplains who gave their lives to save soldiers during the sinking of the troop transport Dorchester
- Charles J. Watters (1927–1967), Army chaplain who was awarded the Medal of Honor posthumously for bravery exhibited while rescuing wounded men in the Battle of Dak To, Vietnam

== Business, government and academia ==
- John P. Caufield (1918–1986), politician and public safety official from Newark who served 20 years as the Fire Director for the Newark Fire Department and seven years in the New Jersey Senate
- Thomas P. Giblin (born 1947), politician who has served since 2006 in the New Jersey General Assembly where he has represented the 34th legislative district
- Patrick E. Hobbs (born 1960), dean of Seton Hall University School of Law
- Shavar Jeffries, attorney and candidate in the 2014 election for Mayor of Newark
- James F. Kelley (1902–1996), president of Seton Hall College (since renamed as Seton Hall University) from 1936 to 1949
- W.J. "Jim" Lane (born 1951), Mayor of Scottsdale, Arizona
- Mike Purzycki (born 1945), Mayor of Wilmington, Delaware
- Jay P. Rolison Jr. (1929–2007, class of 1947), lawyer and politician from New York who served in the New York Senate from 1967 to 1990
- Robert A. Salerno, associate judge on the Superior Court of the District of Columbia
- Paul V. Scura, former executive vice president and head of investment bank of Prudential Securities and current Trustee of Seton Hall Prep
- John Sheridan (1942–2014), lawyer and government official who served as Commissioner of the New Jersey Department of Transportation
- James R. Zazzali (born 1937), former Chief Justice of the New Jersey Supreme Court

== Religion ==
- Thomas George Fahy (1922–1976), Catholic priest and academic administrator, who was the 14th President of Seton Hall University, serving from 1970 until his death
- Frank Joseph Rodimer (1927-2018), Bishop of the Diocese of Paterson
- Arthur J. Serratelli (born 1944), Bishop of the Diocese of Paterson

== Literature and entertainment ==
- Bill Bellamy (born 1965), actor, comedian
- Troy CLE, author of The Marvelous Effect
- Al Eschbach, radio personality
- Ted Leo (born 1970), vocalist/guitarist of Ted Leo and the Pharmacists
- Braden Peters (born 2005), online streamer and influencer known as Clavicular
- Brandon Scoop B Robinson (born 1985), NBA analyst
- Matt Sweeney (born 1969), guitarist/vocalist who has played in various groups, including 1990s bands Zwan with Billy Corgan, Skunk and Chavez

== Sports ==
- Jabri Abdur-Rahim (born 2002), college basketball player for the Georgia Bulldogs
- Ira Bowman (born 1973), assistant coach at Auburn University and retired professional basketball player formerly in the NBA
- Alex Buzbee (born 1985), former defensive end for the Washington Redskins
- Nick Christiani (born 1987), former Major League Baseball player
- Brandon Costner (born 1987, class of 2005), former professional basketball player for Patriots BBC of the Basketball Africa League
- Jaden Craig, American football quarterback for the TCU Horned Frogs
- Walter Dukes (1930–2001), former center for Seton Hall University, and NBA center for the Knicks, Lakers, and Pistons
- Eric Duncan (born 1984), First Round Draft pick of the New York Yankees Minor league baseball player
- David Festa (born 2000), professional baseball pitcher for the Minnesota Twins
- Ashton Gibbs (born 1990), former point guard for the University of Pittsburgh basketball team
- Sterling Gibbs (born 1993), former professional basketball player for Kolossos Rodou of the Greek Basket League
- Jules Heningburg (born 1996), professional lacrosse player on the Redwoods Lacrosse Club of the Premier Lacrosse League and New England Black Wolves of the National Lacrosse League
- Jarrod Johnson (born 1969), former professional football player who played for the Pittsburgh Steelers, San Diego Chargers and the Sacramento Surge of the World League of American Football
- Kerry Keating (born 1971), head coach, Santa Clara University Broncos and former UCLA Bruins' assistant coach
- Jack Kiley (1929–1982), NBA basketball player who played for the Fort Wayne Pistons
- Brandin Knight (born 1981), University of Pittsburgh basketball coach and player, NBA athlete
- Brevin Knight (born 1975), former Stanford basketball player, NBA athlete
- Jim Lansing (1919–2000), All-American end for the Fordham Rams football team and former Fordham football head coach
- Sean Maguire (born 1994), formerfootball quarterback
- Michael Malone (born 1971), NBA championship head coach formerly of the Denver Nuggets
- Joe Martinez (born 1983), pitcher for the Cleveland Indians
- Jaylen McClain (born 2006), college football safety for the Ohio State Buckeyes
- Keven McDonald (born 1956, class of 1974), college basketball player from 1974 to 1978 with the Penn Quakers men's basketball team
- Harry "Moose" Miller (1923–2007), former center/forward for the Seton Hall University basketball team who played one season for the Toronto Huskies of the Basketball Association of America
- Kevin Monangai (born 1993), former running back for the Philadelphia Eagles of the NFL
- John Morrison (born 1945), former professional basketball player who played in the American Basketball Association for the Denver Rockets
- Chet Parlavecchio (born 1960), former college and NFL linebacker who has been a Tennessee Titans assistant special teams coach
- Gorgi Popstefanov (born 1987, class of 2005), Macedonian road racing cyclist
- Rick Porcello (born 1988), former Cy Young winning pitcher with the Boston Red Sox and 2018 World Series Champion
- Dorian Scott (born 1982), Jamaican Olympian shotputter
- Mason Toye (born 1998, class of 2017), soccer player with Minnesota United of Major League Soccer
- Tom Verducci (born 1960), senior writer for Sports Illustrated and field reporter for the MLB postseason on TBS
- Spencer Weisz (born 1995, class of 2013), basketball player for Hapoel Haifa of the Israeli Basketball Premier League
- Tony Woods (born 1965), former NFL linebacker for the Seattle Seahawks, Los Angeles Rams and Washington Redskins
