= Naomi Wilzig =

American erotic art collector

Naomi Wilzig (December 5, 1934 – April 7, 2015) was an American erotic art collector. She was the founder and director of the World Erotic Art Museum in Miami Beach, Florida, which contains her collection.

== Early years ==
Wilzig was one of six children born to real estate developer H. Jerome Sisselman, known as the Hackensack Meadowlands czar, who amassed a large tract of land to build Berry’s Creek Center. Wilzig was born in Newark, New Jersey in 1934. Wilzig graduated from Weequahic High School in Newark, and attended New Jersey’s Montclair State Teachers College, currently Montclair State University. In the early 1950s she married Siggi Wilzig, an Auschwitz survivor and an early leader of the U.S. Holocaust Museum, as well as president of the Trust Company of New Jersey until his death in 2003. The Wilzigs lived most of their married life in Clifton, New Jersey, and had three children: Ivan, Alan, and Sherry. In 2005, following her husband's death in 2003, Wilzig moved to Miami Beach, Florida.

== The collector and the museum ==
In 1983 Wilzig began collecting erotic art for herself. Between 2003 and 2005 she accumulated more than 4,000 pieces from around the world. Her personal collection became the base of the World Erotic Art Museum, which opened in 2005. The collection includes "Kama Sutra temple carvings from India, peek-a-boo Victorian figurines that flash their booties, and a prop from the sexual thriller 'A Clockwork Orange'".

== Civic activism ==
Numerous organizations have benefited from the insight and service of Wilzig. She served at the helm of many of them: as Founder and a Lifetime Member of Hadassah Hospital in Jerusalem, Israel; as a member of the Israel Bonds’ President’s Club; as founder of the Wilzig Hospital Center in Jersey City, N.J.; and the Parents Association of Cardozo Law School of Yeshiva University. She was a Lifetime Member of the Congregation Adas Israel Synagogue in Passaic, N.J., and held the distinction of being the only woman ever honored as Woman of the Year by the Synagogue. Naomi was also a Lifetime Member of the Florida Holocaust Museum in Saint Petersburg. Naomi was also on board of directors of the Holocaust Memorial of the Greater Miami Jewish Federation, Life Member and Director of Daughters of Miriam Center for the Aged, and a member of the American Association of Museums.

== Honors ==
In 2006, on the first anniversary of WEAM, Wilzig was honored with the Key to the City of Miami Beach. In 2011, the City of Miami Beach proclaimed October 16 "World Erotic Art Museum Day" in honor of Wilzig's museum's fifth anniversary.

On October 16, 2010, the city of Miami Beach issued a Proclamation declaring the day "World Erotic Art Museum Day," commemorating the fifth anniversary of the museum. On May 12, 2011, The Institute for Advanced Study of Human Sexuality presented Wilzig with "Doctor of Arts Honors Causa Sexuality/Erotology." On October 16, 2011, the city of Miami Beach issued a proclamation declaring it Naomi Wilzig Day at her public investiture of her doctorate degree ceremony.

On May 12, 2011, the Institute for Advanced Study of Human Sexuality presented Wilzig with "Doctor of Arts Honors Causa Sexuality/Erotology." In 2011 she was chosen as Business Person of the year by the Miami-Dade Gay & Lesbian Chamber of Commerce.
