= Alan Wilzig =

American entrepreneur

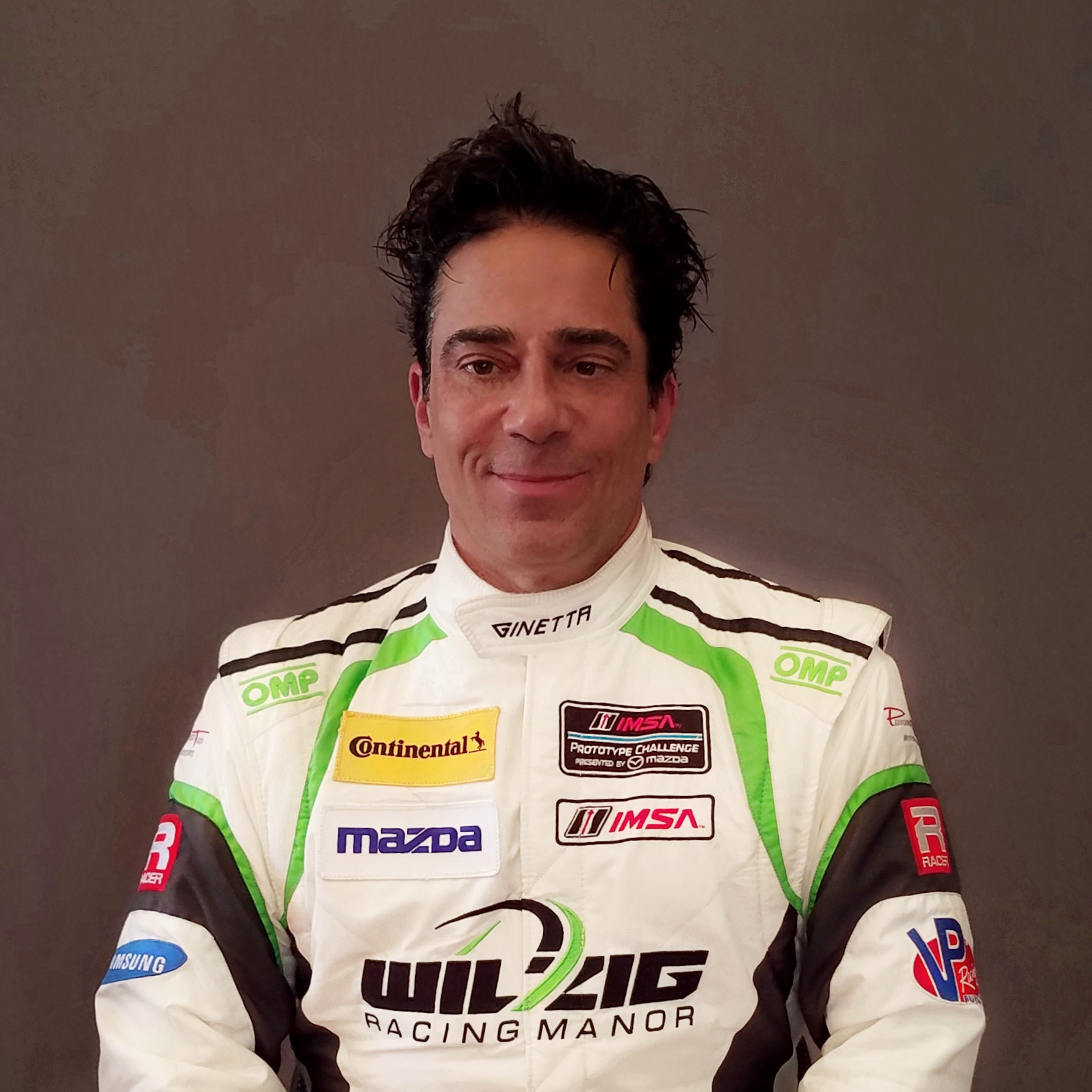
- Wilzig in Sebring, Florida, in 2017
- Born: Clifton, New Jersey, U.S.
- Education: University of Pennsylvania
- Occupation: Entrepreneur
- Years active: 1987–present
- Partner: Karin Hanssen (m. 2003; div. 2016)
- Children: 2
- Website: alanmoto.com

Alan Wilzig is an American entrepreneur, philanthropist, semi-professional race car driver, and restaurateur. He was formerly CEO, president and chairman of the Trust Company of New Jersey.

== Background and early life ==
Wilzig was born and raised in Clifton, New Jersey, to Siggi Wilzig, a Polish Holocaust survivor, and Naomi (né Sisselman), a New Jersey native. He is Jewish. He has two siblings, Ivan Wilzig and Sherry Wilzig. Siggi Wilzig purchased the Trust Company of New Jersey (TCNJ) in 1968, and built it into a 45-branch franchise.

== Career ==
=== Finance ===
After graduating from the Wharton School of the University of Pennsylvania in 1987, Wilzig joined the Trust Company of New Jersey. He was elected to the board of directors in 1997, promoted to senior executive vice president and chief operating officer in 1999, and named president and CEO in 2002. After his father's passing in 2003, he was appointed chairman of the board, while continuing in his role as president and CEO. During this period, the bank expanded to 75 branches and nearly doubled in market value. In December 2003, North Fork Bank agreed to purchase TCNJ for approximately $752 million in cash and stock. North Fork officially acquired TCNJ on May 17, 2004. Following the merger, Wilzig became a director at North Fork.

=== Restaurant ===
Wilzig was a co-owner of the restaurant Kutsher's Tribeca, a modern Jewish-American bistro which opened in Tribeca in 2011. He spent over a year helping refine the restaurant's concept, based in part on Kutsher's Country Club in Monticello, New York.

== Philanthropy ==
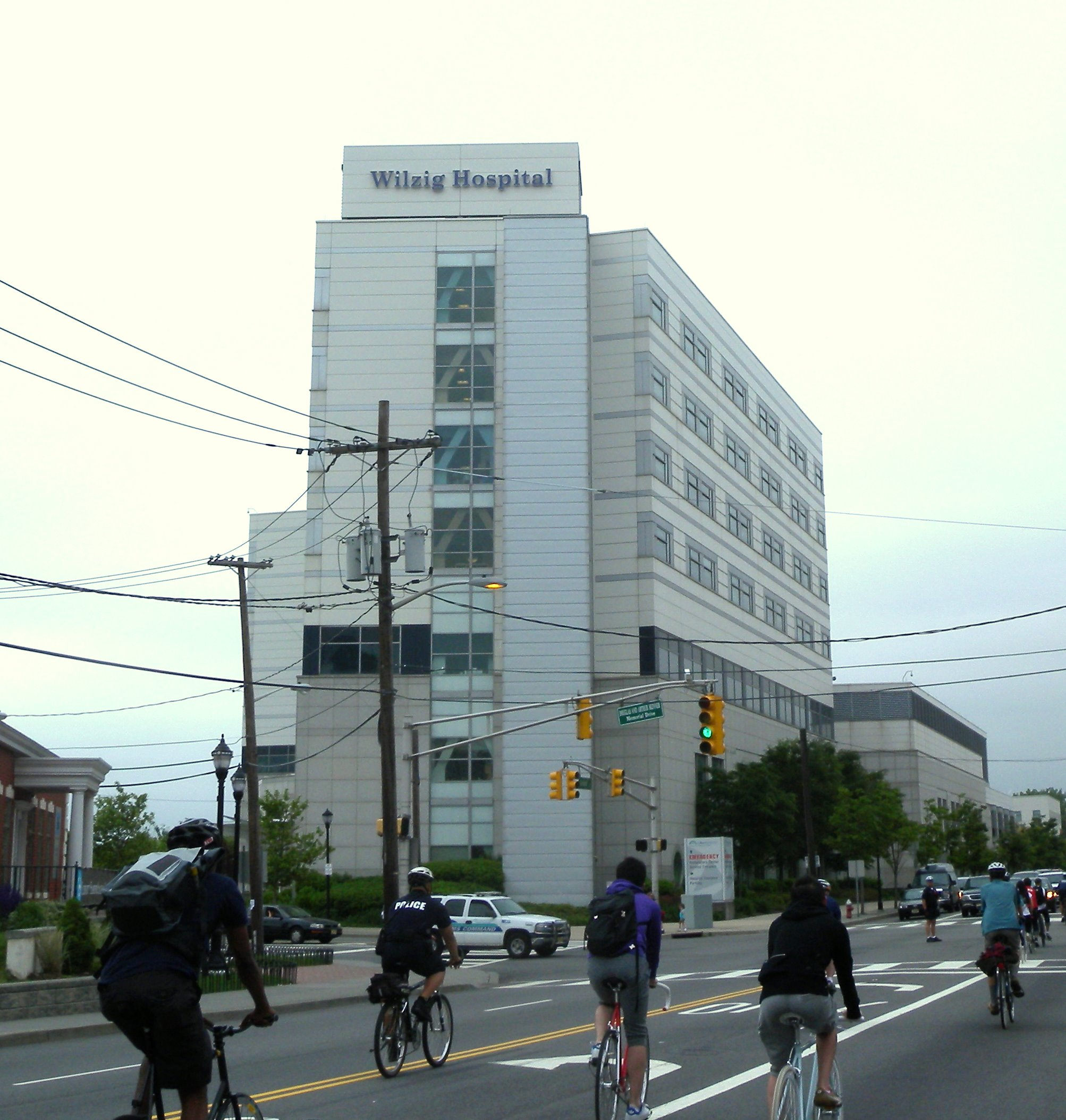
Wilzig Hospital

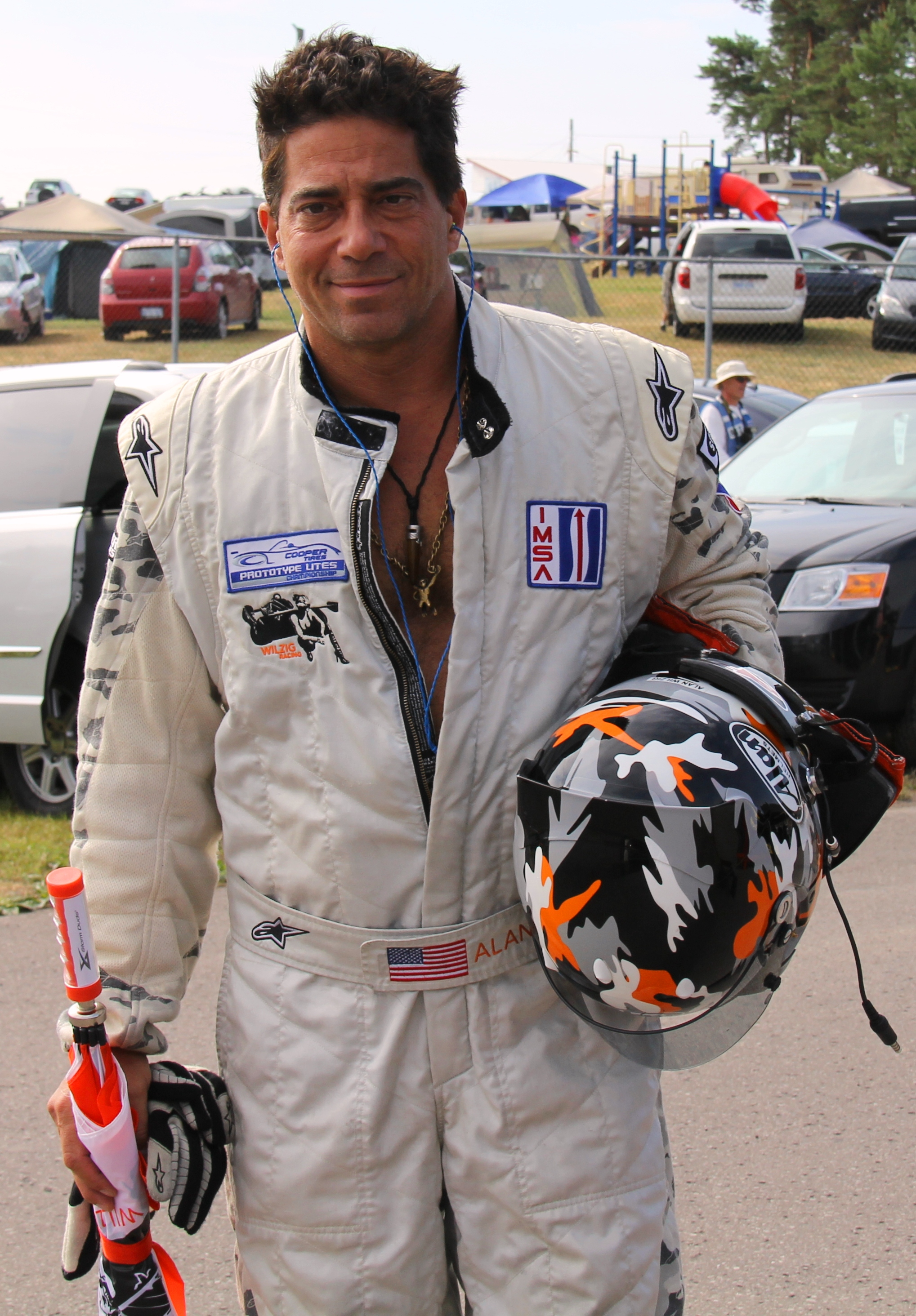
Wilzig at a car race in 2011

After his father's death, Wilzig and his family memorialized him with an endowment, naming one of the facilities at the Jersey City Medical Center "Wilzig Hospital"

Wilzig is the founding director of the Jewish Community Project of Lower Manhattan, created in 2001; a board member of the Rainforest Alliance; was elected vice chairman of the board at Liberty Health in 2008 and remains on the board; and a co-founder of the Chabad of Southampton synagogue. He is a director on the board of the Wilzig Family Foundation, which has donated over $1 million to the University of Pennsylvania.

== Automotive racing and collecting ==
=== Professional racing ===
A semi-professional race car driver and member of the Performance Tech team, Wilzig won the 2011 and 2012 Master's Championship in the L2 class of the Cooper Tires Prototype Lites. He then made the jump to L1 class. He placed second in each of the first two rounds of the Cooper Tires Prototype Lites support series (Masters class) as part of the 2012 Mobil 1 Twelve Hours of Sebring event held in Sebring, Florida. He returned to IMSA competition with the Performance Tech team in the 2017 IMSA Prototype Challenge.

=== Wilzig Racing Manor ===
In 2005, Wilzig purchased a 275-acre property in Taghkanic, New York. The following year, he asked the town zoning board for permission to build a racetrack on the property, which he planned to call Wilzig Racing Manor. Wilzig was fined $50,000 by the New York State Department of Environmental Conservation for proceeding with construction work without an approved stormwater pollution prevention plan. The track was initially denied approval as a "customary accessory use" for a residential property by the Taghkanic Zoning Board of Appeals, a decision initially upheld in court. But continued legal disputes pitting Wilzig against local activists the Granger Group, continued for several years. The Granger Group formed in 2006 to oppose the track's construction, citing concerns about noise, safety, and general quality of life. After the Granger Group's initial victory in the lower New York courts, the New York State Court of Appeals reversed the decision and reinstated the original zoning order, in favor of Wilzig.

The racetrack was completed in 2011 at a cost of $7.5 million. It is the largest racetrack zoned for private recreational use in the US. The track is over a mile in length and 40 feet wide, contains an elevation change of 80 feet from the highest to lowest point, and is capable of being run in several configurations. The longest such configuration, intended for time trials, allows for a 2.75 mile lap with only one pair of consecutive turns in the same direction.

=== Collection ===
Wilzig owns over 100 cars, motorcycles and off-road vehicles, which he houses at the Wilzig Racing Manor. His car collection includes a Gardner-Douglas Lola T70, Lotus Esprit V8, 2008 Lotus 2-Eleven, 2006 West WR1000, 2006 Ariel Atom, Toyota-powered Indy car, McLaren 650S and Ginetta LMP3. His motorcycle collection includes 24 Bimotas, a 1953 Moto Guzzi, 1974 Ducati Sport, 1976 Ducati 900ss and 1992 Honda NR750. He also owns KTM adventure bikes. Cycle World referred to his motorcycle collection as the envy of motorcycle collectors, dubbing his garage the "Garaj Mahal". He has appeared on a variety of motorsports-oriented programming.

In 2004, Wilzig created a motorcycle combining parts and features from the Ducati 998 and MV Agusta F4. Considered a tribute to the motorcycles' original designer, Massimo Tamburini, the fusion motorcycle was judged by the Robb Report to be an ideal motorcycle for fans of Tamburini's designs.

== Wilzig Castle ==
In 1996, Wilzig began building a 14,000 square foot Medieval-style homestead in Water Mill on Long Island, New York. The Wilzig Castle, as Wilzig named it, was featured on the Travel Channel's 2005 hour-long special Grand Castles of America. In 2003, Wilzig sold his 50% share to his brother Ivan, who owned the other half, and continues to live in the castle. It is regularly the site of celebrity-filled Hamptons parties.

== Personal life ==
Wilzig married Karin Hanssen in 2003. They divorced in 2016. They have two children.

Aaron Lazar portrayed Blair Hollingsworth, a character based on Wilzig, in The Wolf of Wall Street.
