= Siggi B. Wilzig =

American businessman and Holocaust survivor

Siggi B. Wilzig, born Siegbert Wilzig (March 11, 1926 – January 7, 2003), was a survivor of concentration camps Auschwitz and Mauthausen who arrived in the USA in 1947 with little money and only a grade school education. By the time of his death in 2003, he had created an empire in oil and banking with more than $4 billion in assets. Wilzig was a frequent lecturer on the importance of Holocaust memory, an outspoken opponent of Holocaust denial, and instrumental in building the U.S. Holocaust Memorial Museum in Washington, D.C.

== Early life ==
Siegbert Wilzig was born in 1926 in Krojanke in West Prussia, Germany (now Krajenka, Poland), the son of traditional Jewish parents and the second youngest of eight children. In 1936, Siegbert and his family fled mounting antisemitism in their town and relocated to Berlin, where his father made a living selling textiles. In 1941, Siegbert was conscripted into forced labor working twelve-hour shifts for a German armament factory. In 1943, at age 16, he was deported along with his family and other Jews to the Auschwitz concentration camp in Occupied Poland. He once calculated that 59 members of his family had been murdered by the Nazis. In Auschwitz, Siegbert survived first by lying that he was eighteen (most young people under eighteen were automatically sent to be murdered in gas chambers) and then pretending to be a master tool-maker. He continued pretending to be an expert in whatever skills the camp operators needed. He survived selection for death a dozen times, multiple beatings, starvation, and other torture. By early 1945, Allied forces were winning the war and Nazi soldiers force-marched remaining prisoners to alternate camps. He survived two such death marches and was liberated from Mauthausen concentration camp in Austria in May 1945 by the US Army. Siegbert was the only child in his Jewish school class of 1,500 students to survive the Holocaust. Wilzig credited his survival to his foxlike instincts and to “the hand of the Almighty.”

== Life after the Holocaust ==
On May 5, 1945, Wilzig was rescued by the U.S. Army from the Mauthausen-Gusen concentration camp. He expressed his gratitude by spending the next two years as a volunteer helping the U.S. Counter-Intelligence Corps track down former SS and other operators of Hitler's camps. In 1947, his service earned him a visa to the United States of America. Soon after he came to the U.S., he legally changed his name to Siggi Bert Wilzig -- "Siggi B. Wilzig." Wilzig arrived in New York at age 21, with only $240, no education beyond grade school, and no business contacts. He earned his first dollar shoveling snow in the Bronx after a fierce blizzard. His next job was laboring in toxic sweatshops.

In the 1950s Wilzig accepted whatever jobs he could find, including bow-tie presser, traveling salesman, and eventually general manager of a furniture store. He possessed persuasive sales skills and in a matter of months tripled the business. In 1952 a produce vendor working from his truck introduced him to Naomi Sisselman, daughter of a successful orthodox Jewish businessman, and on New Year's Eve 1953, Wilzig and Naomi were married before a judge. Later they had a traditional Jewish wedding service. The couple had three children over the course of their marriage: two sons, Ivan and Alan, and a daughter named Sherry.

== Business career ==
In the early 1960s, Wilzig began spending his sales commissions to purchase stock in Wilshire Oil Company of Texas. A chance meeting with a more experienced investor led to Wilzig spearheading a takeover of Wilshire. Despite his ignorance of the oil and gas industry, he demonstrated to Wilshire's board of directors that he possessed extraordinary insight when it came to business decisions. By 1965, he had grown Wilshire's bottom line, and the board elected him the company's new president. Six months later, at the age of 39, he was elected president and chief executive of the company.

Sensing that future growth would depend on access to large amounts of cash, Wilzig led Wilshire in acquiring a controlling interest in the Trust Company of New Jersey (TCNJ), a full-service commercial bank. Once again, despite his lack of experience in the particulars of the industry, Wilzig grew TCNJ into one of the largest, most profitable mid-sized banks in the state of New Jersey. In 1969 the bank board elected him its new president, chairman of the board and chief executive officer. Cancer forced him to step down from his duties as president in 2002. By then, Wilzig had grown TCNJ's assets from $181 million to more than $4 billion. He was succeeded as president by his son, Alan, and in 2003, less than a year after Wilzig's death, the bank was sold to North Fork Bank for $726 million in an all-stock transaction. Two years later, North Fork Bank was sold to Capital One.

== Philanthropy ==
In addition to his business interests, Wilzig was a leading figure in Jewish humanitarian and philanthropic affairs, particularly projects relating to the Holocaust. In 1975 he became the first Holocaust survivor to lecture before cadets and officers of the United States Military Academy at West Point. In 1980, when Nobel Prize laureate author Elie Wiesel was appointed to head the U.S. Holocaust Memorial Council by President Jimmy Carter, the first person Wiesel nominated to serve with him was Wilzig, who was sworn in as one of the Museum Council's founding members. In 1985, Wilzig received an honorary doctorate of law from Hofstra University Law School, where the Siggi B. Wilzig Distinguished Professor of Constitutional Rights was endowed. He received a second honorary doctorate of law from the Benjamin N. Cardozo Law School, where he was a founding director. He was a recipient of the Ellis Island Medal of Honor in recognition of his contributions to the nation.

Wilzig's successes enabled him to support a number of charities, including Wilzig Hospital at the Jersey City Medical Center, the Daughters of Miriam Home for the Aged, and the Jewish Home and Rehabilitation Center. He raised more than $100 million in Israeli bonds, and for his support of the State of Israel was awarded the nation's Prime Minister's Medal.

In 2003 at age 76, Siggi B. Wilzig died after a struggle with multiple myeloma. He was survived by his wife, Naomi (who died in 2015), his sons Ivan Wilzig and Alan Wilzig, his daughter Sherry Wilzig Izak.
