= John L. McNulty =

The Very Right Reverend Monsignor John L. McNulty, Ph.D., (b. 1898) was an American Roman Catholic Domestic prelate and the 13th President of Seton Hall University. McNulty received an A.B. (1921) and an M.A. (1922) from Seton Hall. He received his Ph.D. from NYU in 1935 and a Dipl. from d’ Écoles Supérieures at the Lille Catholic University in 1937. McNulty was ordained a priest of the Roman Catholic Church in 1925. He was an educator at Seton Hall University from 1928 and its president from 1949 - 1959, succeeding James F. Kelley. McNulty was invested as a Domestic Prelate of His Holiness Pius XII in 1950. Seton Hall University's Science and Technology Center at McNulty Hall, containing the famed “Atomic Wall” artwork depicting the gift of scientific knowledge from god to man, is named for the Right Reverend Dr. John McNulty. Monsignor John Laurence McNulty established Seton Hall University's Institute of Far Eastern Studies in 1951 in the midst of the Korean War.

== See also ==
- Seton Hall University § Buildings
- Very Reverend
