= Ivan Wilzig =

American recording artist and songwriter (born 1956)

Ivan L. Wilzig
- Also known as: Sir Ivan, Peaceman, Mr. Mitzvah
- Born: January 6, 1956 (age 70)
- Origin: Newark, New Jersey, US
- Genres: EDM, dance/pop
- Occupations: Singer-songwriter, recording artist, philanthropist
- Years active: 2000-present
- Labels: Peaceman Music, Tommy Boy Records, Jellybean Recordings, Artemis Records, Coldharbour Recordings
- Website: SirIvan.com

Ivan L. Wilzig (born January 6, 1956) is an American recording artist and songwriter who is best known for his pop-dance remakes of 1960s and early 1970s peace and anti-war songs.

He created The Peaceman Foundation, a non-profit organization that battles hatred, violence and post traumatic stress disorder (PTSD). In the US alone, he has appeared on various reality television shows, such as Who Wants to be a Superhero?, on Syfy, Epic Castle on the Destination America channel The Fabulous Life of the Hamptons on VH1, Chef Roble & Co. on Bravo, and most recently on Super Heroes in 3D TV on 3Net.

== Early life and banking career ==
Ivan Wilzig was born in 1956 and raised with his two younger siblings, Alan and sister Sherry, in Clifton, New Jersey, where he attended Clifton High School. Wilzig's father Siggi Wilzig (1926–2003) came to the United States as a Holocaust survivor from Germany. Fifty-nine of his relatives were murdered by the Nazis during the Holocaust. His mother was an art collector Naomi Wilzig (1934-2015). After multiple salesman positions, Siggi Wilzig ultimately became chairman, President and CEO of Wilshire Oil Company of Texas, then listed on the NYSE; and chairman, President and CEO of The Trust Company of New Jersey, then listed on NASDAQ.

Wilzig graduated from the University of Pennsylvania, in 1977, with a BA degree in European intellectual history. He then earned his JD degree at Benjamin N. Cardozo School of Law at Yeshiva University in 1980. Instead of practicing law, he joined his father in running The Trust Company of New Jersey, a full-service commercial bank founded in 1896. Under Wilzig the Trust Company brokered various deals that allowed 50 bank mini-branches to open up in A&P, Pathmark and ShopRite supermarkets, in affluent New Jersey counties.

== Music career ==
Wilzig began voice lessons at the age of 10. In his youth, he attended an Orthodox Hebrew school, and sang in the synagogue choir. His first professional gigs were singing at Kutsher's Country Club in the Catskill Mountains, and then as a soloist at Town Hall in New York City with the Samuel Sterner Choir. Later, he performed in both high school (Fiddler on the Roof) and college (Bye Bye Birdie) musicals. His father Siggi discouraged him from continuing in music as a career, wanting his son to have a more secure profession.

In 2001, Ivan Wilzig met recording industry executive Dave Jurman, Senior Director of Dance Music at Columbia Records. Jurman introduced Wilzig to two-time Grammy Award nominee and record producer Ernie Lake, who produced Ivan's remake of John Lennon's "Imagine" with Ivan performing vocals. Tom Silverman, owner of Tommy Boy Records signed the track and released it on September 4, 2001. "Imagine", sold 10,000 vinyl copies in its first three months and became a Top-40 hit on the Billboard Club Play Chart. It was the first time a Beatles or John Lennon song had been remade as an electronic dance music song.

His follow-up single, "San Francisco" was signed by label owner Jellybean Benitez, and released on Jellybean Recordings, reaching #7 on the Billboard Singles Sales Chart. Wilzig's third single, "Peace on Earth", was his first original song, and was released by Artemis Records, making the Billboard Charts and reached number #2 on the DMC (Dance Music Community) World Chart in the UK.

== Television and film ==
=== Reality TV ===
During the first season of Who Wants to be a Superhero? in 2006, Ivan attempted to audition with the producers as Peaceman, but he was too late to be included. He was encouraged to audition for the next season. His Peaceman character made the cut for Season Two, but as a precondition, the SyFy channel owned by NBC, was to obtain the trademarks to contestant characters. Ivan refused to give up the trademark to Peaceman, and attempted to create a new character Mitzvah Man, but the name had already been trademarked. Mr. Mitzvah, however, was not trademarked, and he took on the identity of Mr. Mitzvah for the show. He was, however, eliminated after the 3rd episode by Stan Lee.

=== Other ===
Ivan has appeared on numerous lifestyle and reality television shows since 2000. He was on the Travel Channel's Manhattan on the Beach in 2000, the WE show Single in the Hamptons in 2002. VH1's Hopelessly Rich (Hopelessly Rich) in 2003, VH1's (The Fabulous Life of the Hamptons). in 2007. In 2012, Wilzig appeared on "The Crazy Hamptons Blowout," Episode 5 of Bravo's Chef Roble and Co., which aired January 1, 2012. Most recently, Sir Ivan made his first 3D TV appeared on 3Net's Super Heroes show, which first aired on February 10, 2013.

He appeared on the German television channel ProSieben right after the September 11, 2001 terrorist attacks, where he discussed his single, "Imagine". In early 2004, this time as part of the series So lebt ein Milliardaer! Lifestyle of a Billionaire, he appeared as Peaceman next to supermodel Naomi Campbell, DJ Paul Oakenfold and tennis player Venus Williams. In 2006, ProSieben featured him in Die Maedchen und der Milliardaer (The Girls and the Billionaire). In the late 1990s Ivan and Alan Wilzig built a 15,000-square-foot (1,400 m^{2}) medieval-style castle in Water Mill, in the Hamptons, on Long Island, New York, commonly referred to now as "Sir Ivan's Castle".

== Discography ==
Singles

- "Imagine" (2001, Peaceman Music)
- "San Francisco (Be Sure to Wear Flowers in Your Hair)" (2004, Peaceman Music)
- "Peace on Earth" (2004, Peaceman Music)
- "For What It's Worth" Remix (2008, Peaceman Music)
- "Kumbaya" (2009, Peaceman Music)
- "Hare Krishna" Remix (2010, Peaceman Music)
- "Live For Today" (2011, Peaceman Music)
- "La La Land" (2012, Peaceman Music)
- "Here Comes The Sun" (2014 Peaceman Music)
- "Kiss All The Bullies Goodbye" (2015 Peaceman Music)
- "Imagine 2016" (2016 Peaceman Music)
- "I Am Peaceman" (2017 Peaceman Music)
- "Get Together" (The Remixes) (2018, Peaceman Music)
- "Turn! Turn! Turn!" with Markus Schulz (2024, Coldharbour Recordings)

Albums

- For What It's Worth (2008, Peaceman Music)
- Kumbaya (2009, Peaceman Music)
- Hare Krishna (2010, Peaceman Music)
- Live For Today (2011, Peaceman Music)
- I Am Peaceman (2010, Peaceman Music)
- I Am Peaceman (2012, Peaceman Music/ Worldwide Records) - India
- Here Comes The Sun (2013, Peaceman Music)
- Kiss All The Bullies Goodybye (2015 Peaceman Music)
- Peaceman Shines 2016 (2016 Peaceman Music)
