= The Marvelous Effect =

2007 novel by Troy CLE

- Author: Troy CLE
- Language: English
- Series: Marvelous World
- Genre: Science fiction
- Publication date: 2007
- Publication place: United States

The Marvelous Effect is a science fiction novel by Troy CLE first published in May 2007. It is the first book in the Marvelous World series.

== Plot summary ==
The novel tells the story of 13-year-old Louis Proof, an African-American native to East Orange, NJ who is a CLE. (Celestial Like Entity), and how a race of CEs (Celestial Entities) called the "eNoli" (E-No-Lie) led by Galonius, try to drive the world into chaos. Louis's best friend, Brandon, his younger cousin Lacey, and the iLone (Eye-Low-Nay) Timothy, team together to free the world from Galonius's influence, as Louis masters his CLE abilities.

The story is heavily action driven being influenced by on the author's love of video games and action films. Surprisingly, the book rests upon a foundation of classical literature and the philosophy of Immanuel Kant and David Hume.

== Reception ==
Kirkus Reviews said "from the start, the action is fast, the suspense constant and the story always entertaining. Narrative techniques include an omniscient narrator, bold-faced comments and pep talks, letters and flashbacks. A complex mix of fantasy and science fiction will appeal strongly to adventure fans, gamers and reluctant readers. The combination of ambitious narrative, some overly explicit violent episodes and a few vulgarities will require maturity on the part of readers." Christi Voth Esterle in her review for School Library Journal said that "the narration has the free-flowing, engrossing rhythm of oral storytelling, punctuated by poetic interludes that comment (sometimes ironically) on the action. A worthy addition to modern-age magic tales such as Rick Riordan’s “Percy Jackson and the Olympians” series."
