= Holocaust Memorial of the Greater Miami Jewish Federation =

Public sculpture in Florida

Coordinates: 25.795506°N 80.136219°W

The Holocaust Memorial of the Greater Miami Jewish Federation is a Holocaust memorial at 1933-1945 Meridian Avenue, in Miami Beach, Florida.

It was conceived by a committee of Holocaust survivors in 1984, formally established in 1985 as the Holocaust Memorial Committee, a non-profit organization.

The memorial was designed by Kenneth Treister on a site designated by the City of Miami Beach Commission at Meridian Avenue and Dade Boulevard. This site was previously the home of Holocaust survivors William and Florrie Loeb and their son Robert, who emigrated from Rotterdam, Netherlands after the bombing and occupation by the Nazis. They purchased the home in the 1940s and Florrie sold it to the city of Miami Beach in the early 1970s who had plans to make it into a parking lot. There remain trees in the back of the Memorial that were planted by the original owners of the property in the 1920s and 1930s.

The memorial was opened on Sunday, February 4, 1990, with Nobel laureate Elie Wiesel as guest speaker at the dedication ceremonies. Miami Attorney and Holocaust survivor Andrew C. Hall serves as chairman

== Gallery ==
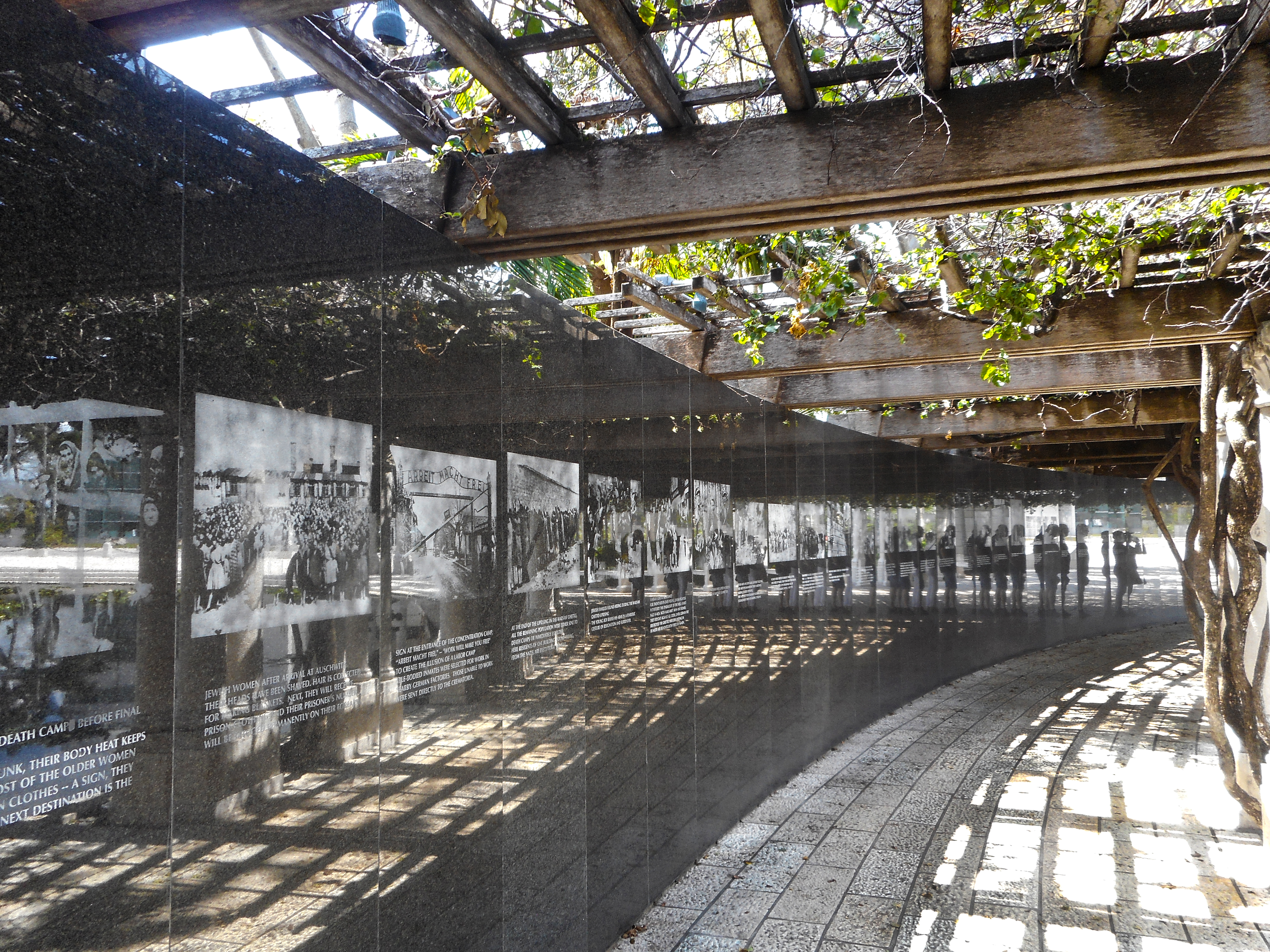

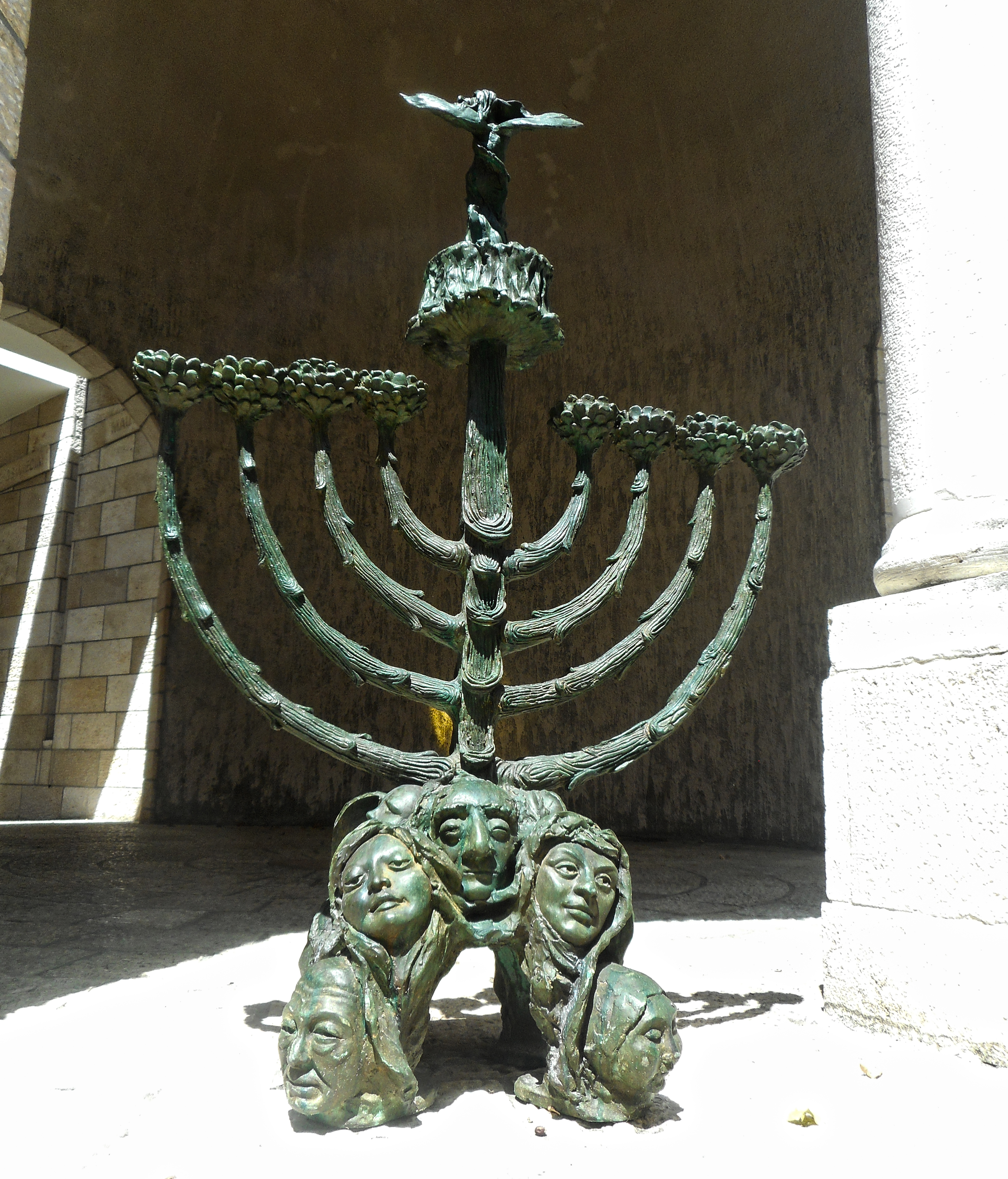

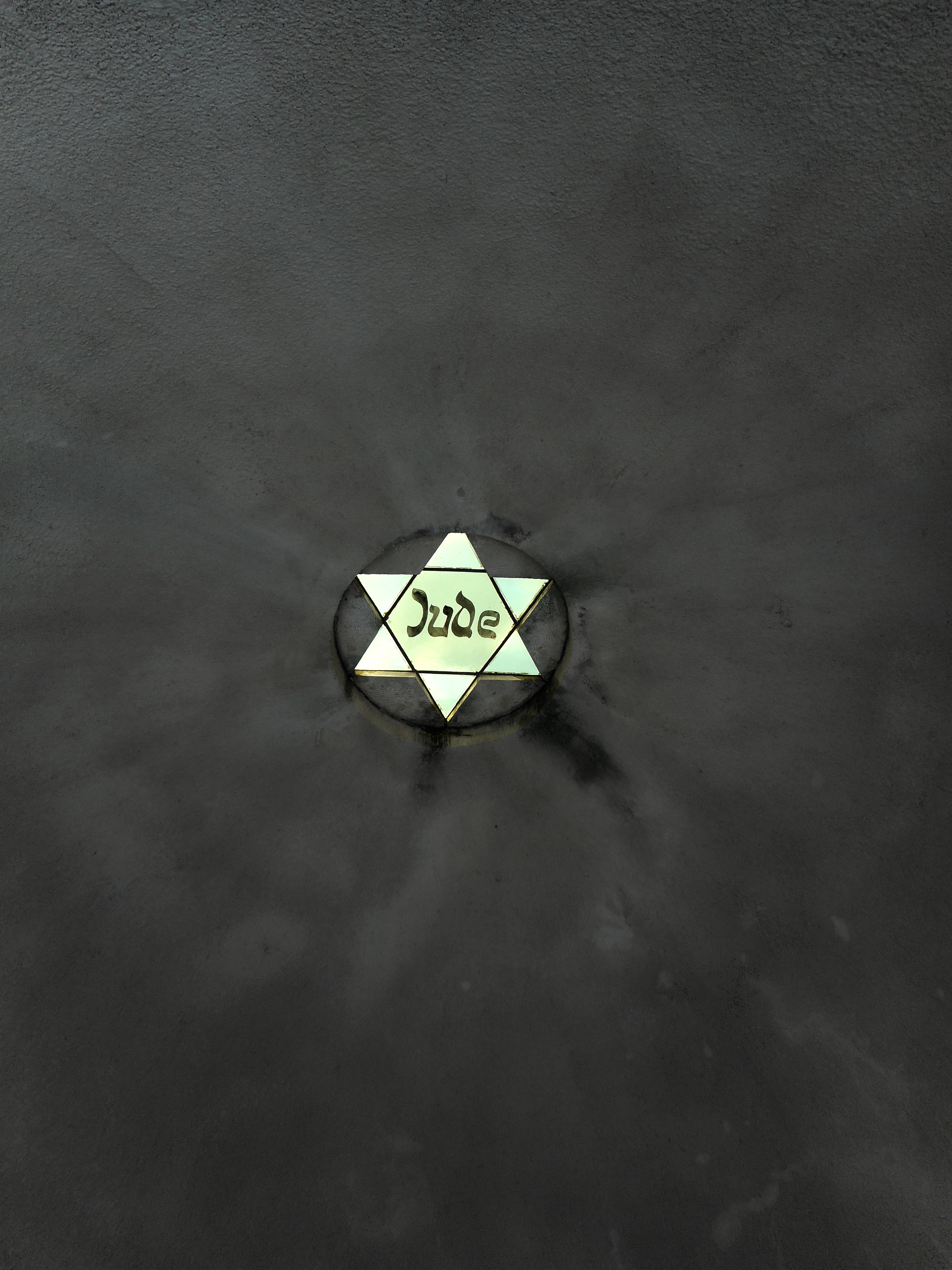

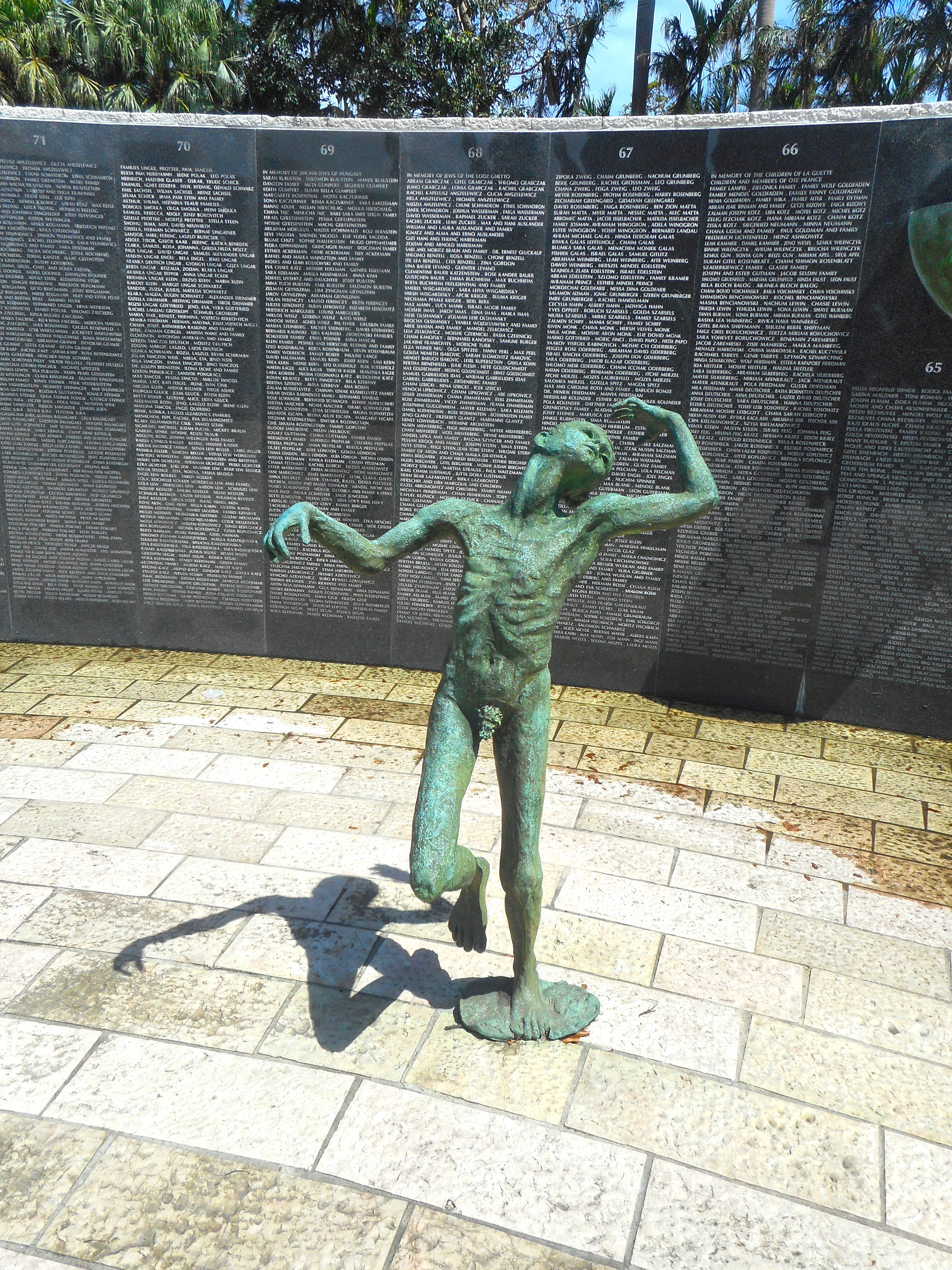

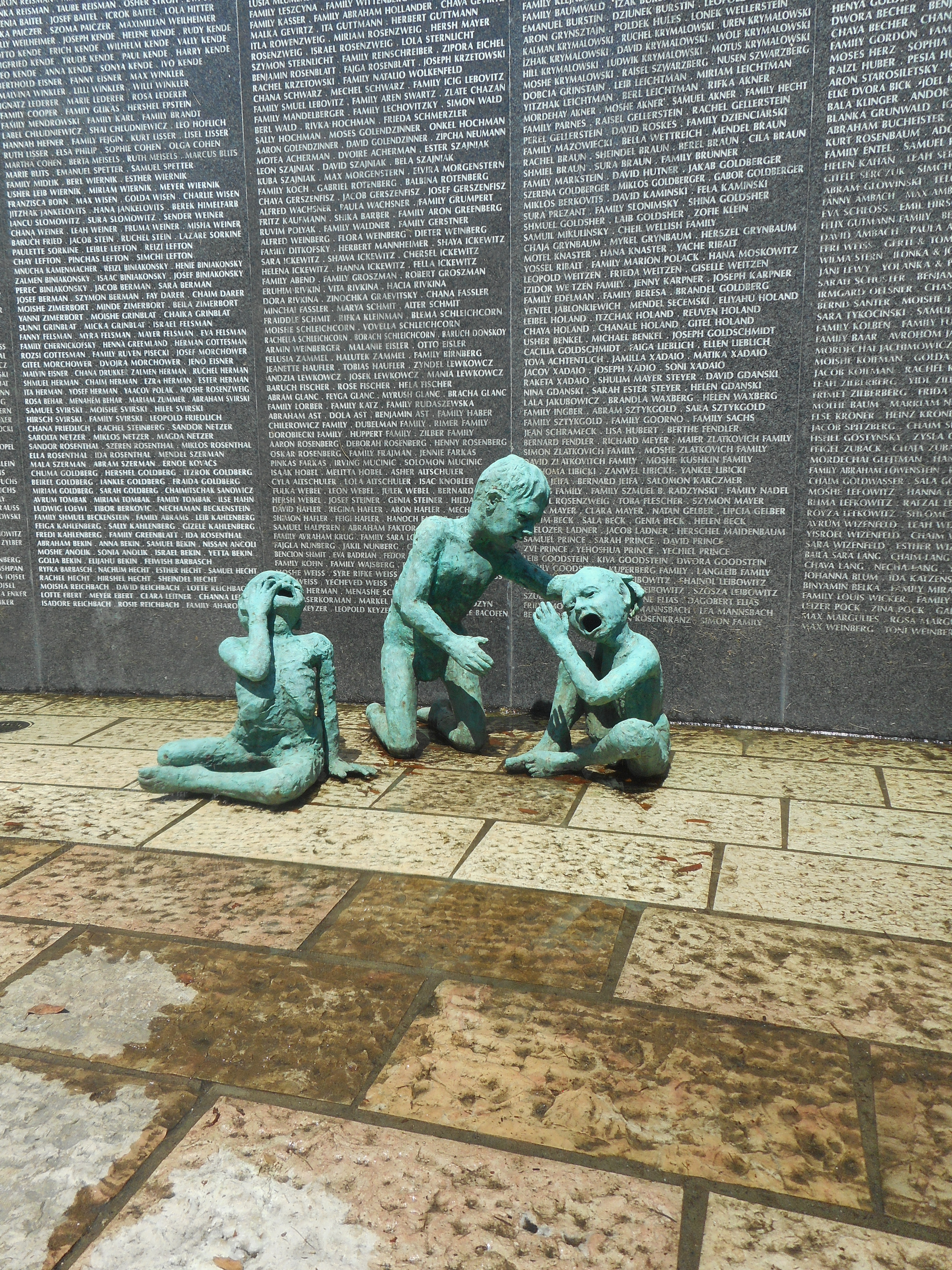

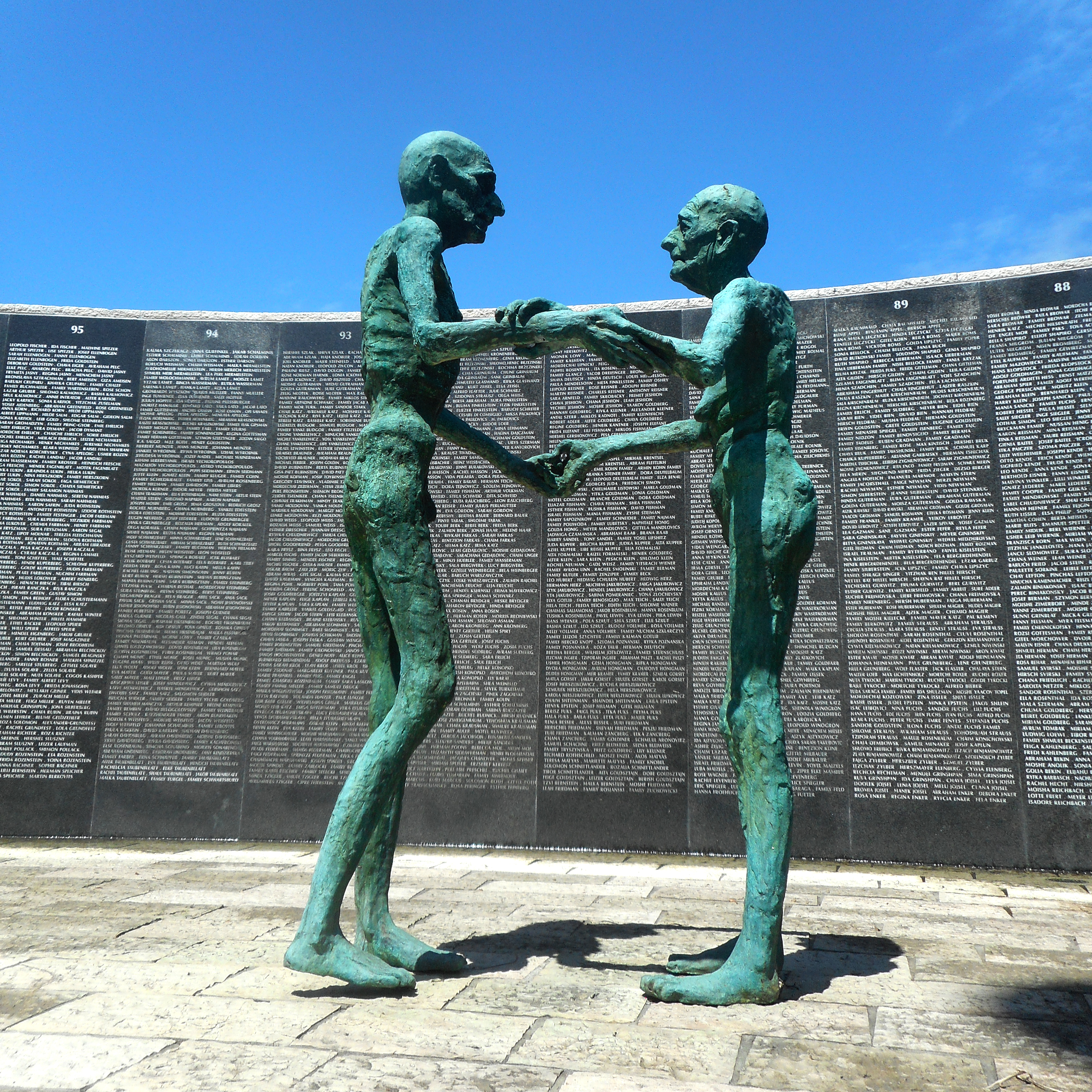

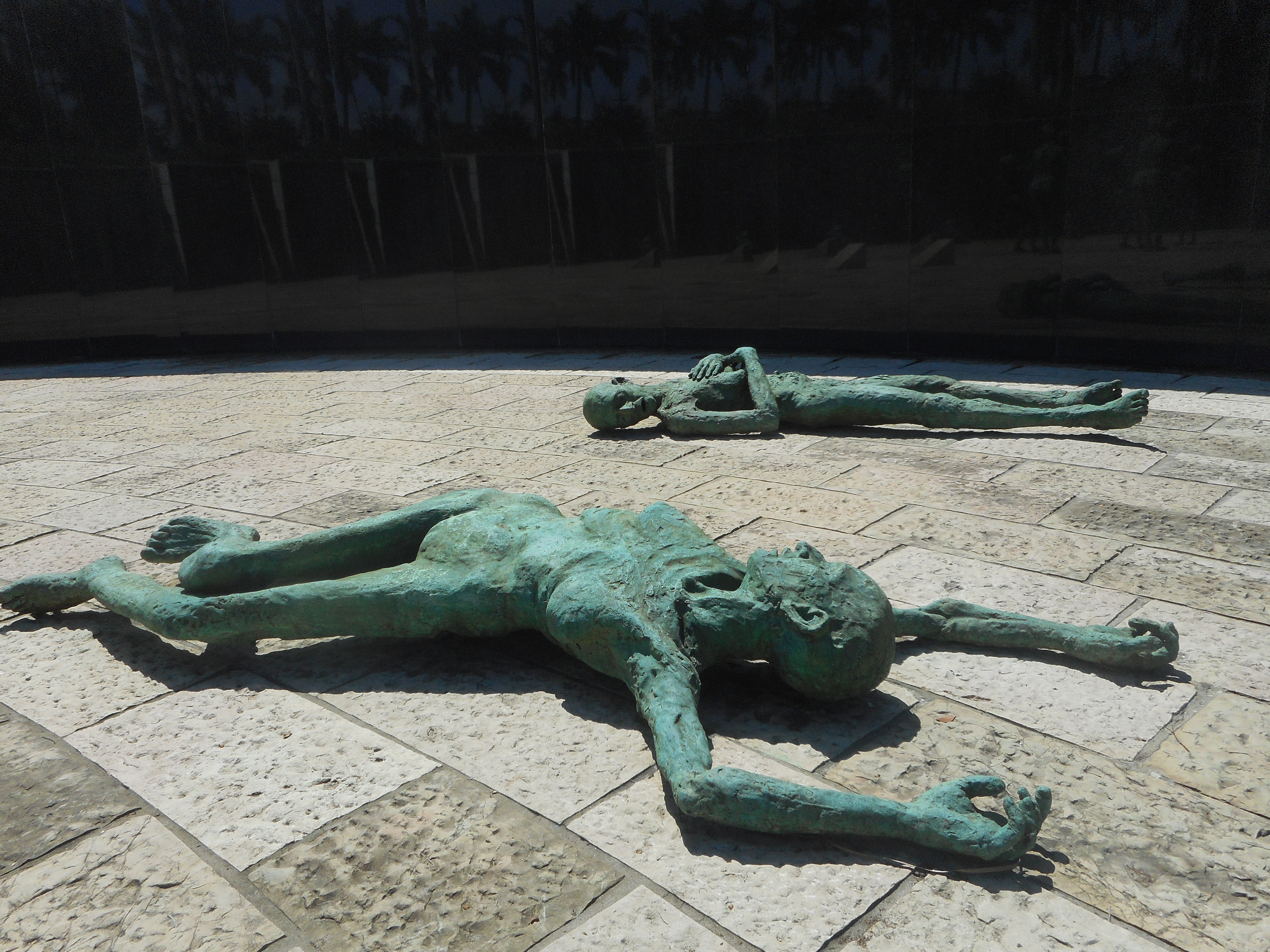

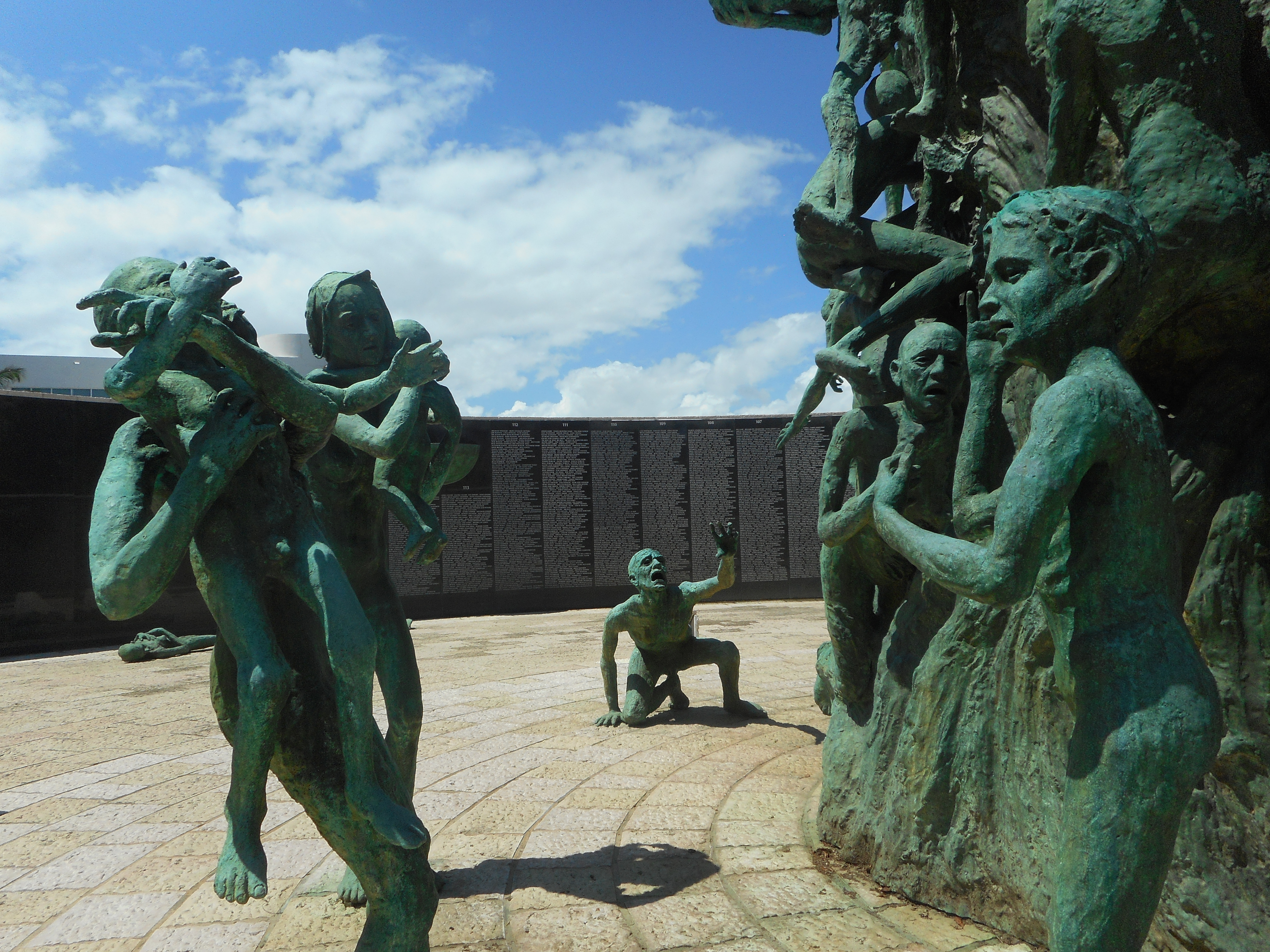

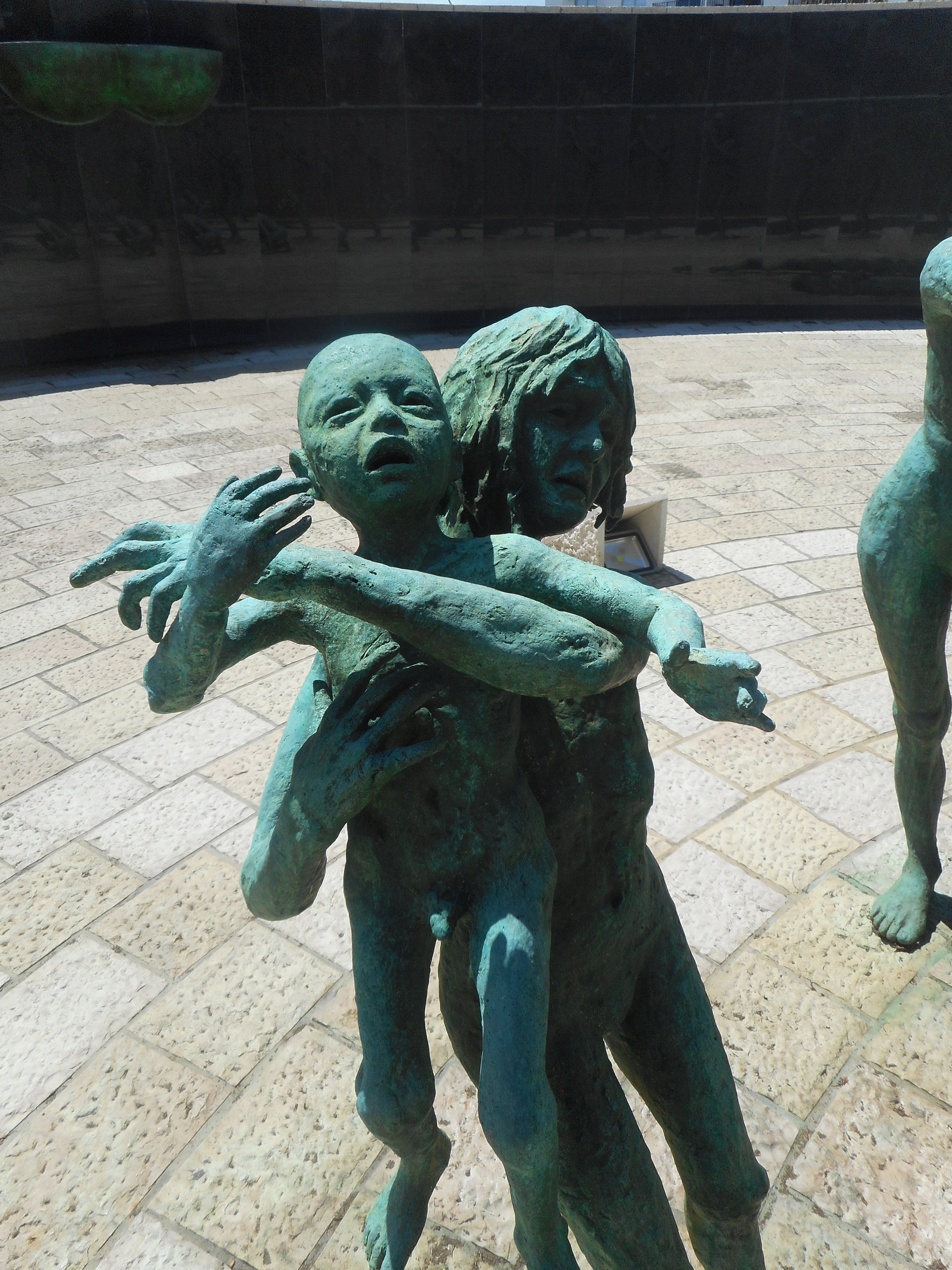

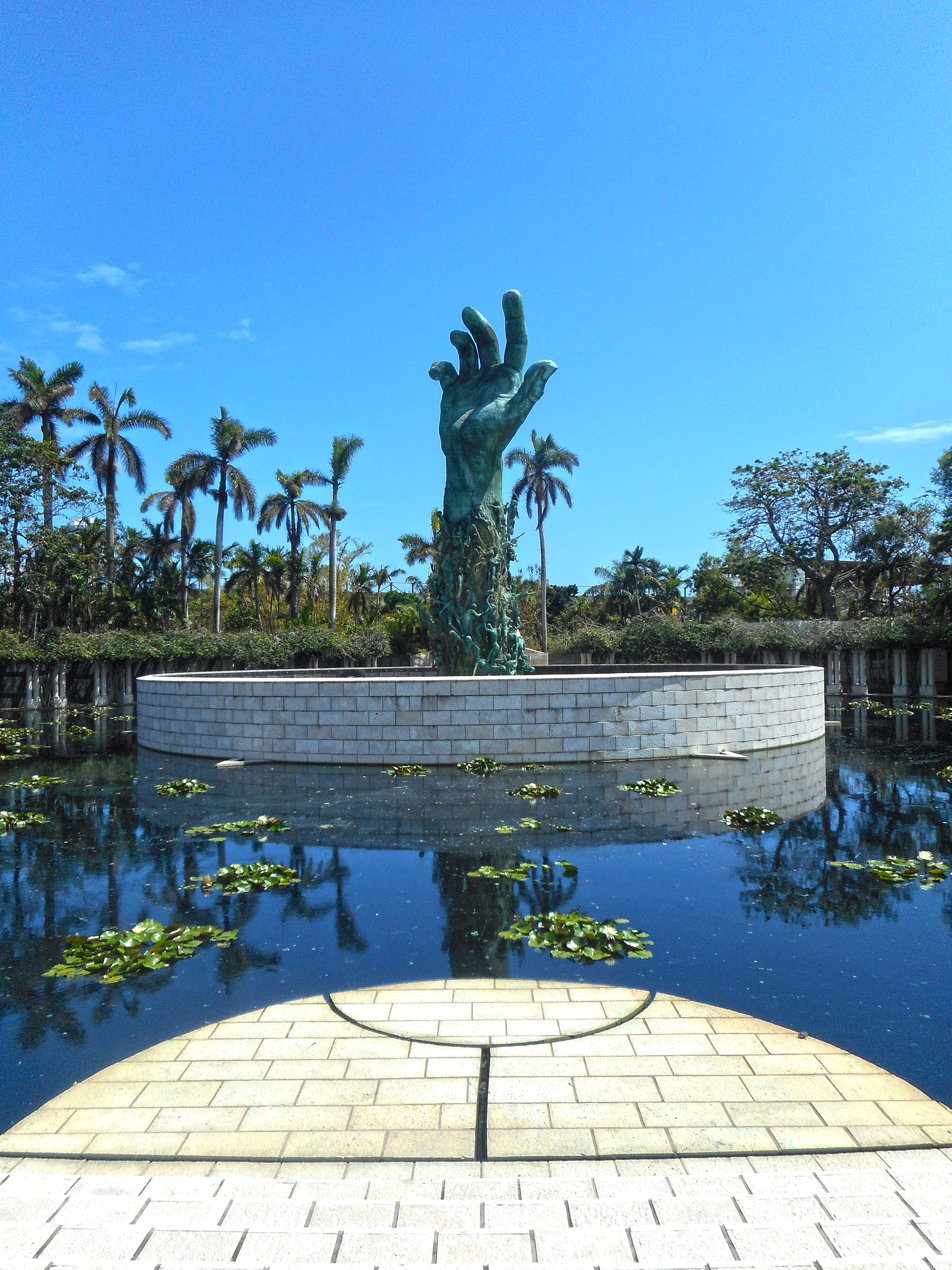
