= James F. Kelley =

American priest and academic (1902–1996)

The Reverend Monsignor James F. Kelley
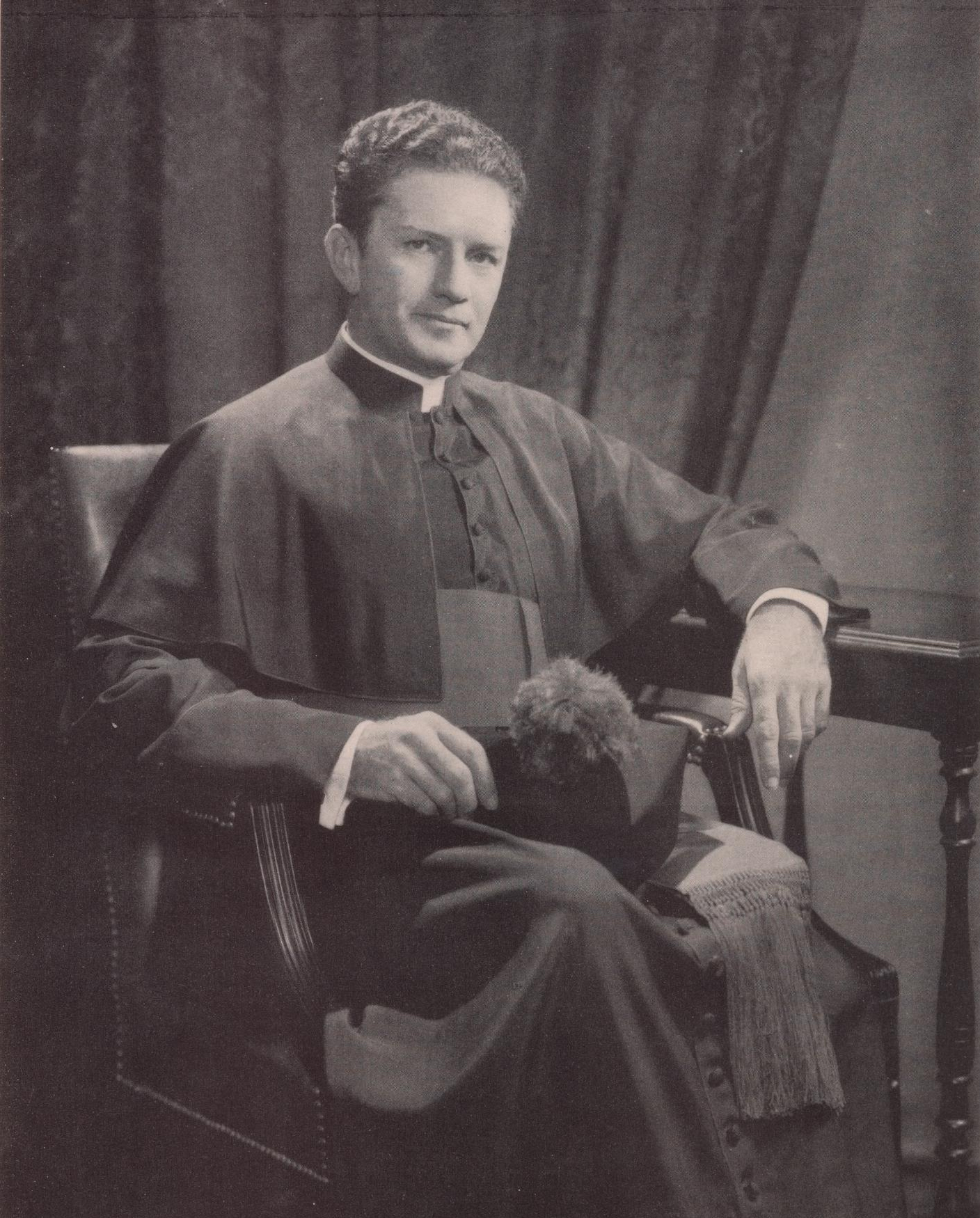

President of Seton Hall University
- In office July 11, 1936 – March 1949
- Preceded by: Francis J. Monaghan
- Succeeded by: John L. McNulty

Personal details
- Born: James Francis Kelley; July 27, 1902 Kearny, New Jersey, U.S.
- Died: September 11, 1996 (aged 94) Brick, New Jersey, U.S.
- Education: Seton Hall University (BA, MA); University of Louvain (PhD)

Orders
- Ordination: July 8, 1928

James Francis Kelley (July 27, 1902 – September 11, 1996) was an American Roman Catholic monsignor who was one of the nation's youngest college presidents when he was appointed as a 33-year-old in 1936 to lead Seton Hall College and grew the school's enrollment tenfold before he left the position in 1949, shortly before it became Seton Hall University. Decades after his retirement, he told a reporter that he was responsible for helping Amelia Earhart to live under an assumed name for decades after it was believed she crashed and died while flying across the Pacific Ocean.

== Early life and education ==
Born in Kearny, New Jersey to James F. Kelley Sr. and Frances Shaw Kelley, Kelley graduated in 1920 from Seton Hall Preparatory School and from Seton Hall College in 1924. He received his ordination in 1928 after his studies in Belgium and earned a doctorate at the Université catholique de Louvain. Kelley was named as a monsignor in 1941 by Pope Pius XII, who had been a student in an English language class that Kelley had taught.

== Career ==
When he was 33 years old and serving as head of the colleges' department of philosophy, he was appointed by Bishop (later Archbishop) Thomas J. Walsh of Newark to serve as president of Seton Hall College in July 1936, making him the nation's youngest college president. When he took office, he led a liberal arts school that had an enrollment of 300. During his tenure, he oversaw the admission of women and the construction of the Walsh Gymnasium, as part of a project initiated in 1939 that would cost $600,000 (equivalent to $13.9 million in 2025). He was named as a monsignor by Pope Pius XII in 1941, making him the youngest priest in the Newark Archdiocese to be recognized with that designation.

Kelley stepped down from office at Seton Hall in March 1949 in the wake of an investigation into the school by the federal government that looked into potential improper sales of war surplus equipment that had been given for the school's use. He was succeeded by John L. McNulty. Enrollment at the school had grown to 6,000 by the time he left office. A year later, the school was granted university status.

He was named as a pastor of Our Lady of Mount Carmel in Ridgewood, New Jersey, where he served for more than two decades and was actively involved in community organizations. After retiring in 1976, he was a resident of Rumson, New Jersey.

In 1991, Kelley told a reporter investigating the disappearance of Amelia Earhart, that she had survived the war and that he had been ordered by Francis Joseph Spellman to repatriate her to the United States, where she lived as Irene Craigmile Bolam.

He died at Ocean Medical Center on September 11, 1996.
