= Paul V. Scura =

Paul V. Scura was the former executive vice president and head of the investment bank of Prudential Securities, a subsidiary of Prudential Financial, from 1986 to 2000. He was responsible for the firm's efforts in the areas of mergers and acquisitions, restructuring and reorganization, private finance, high-yield finance and all international and US investment banking. Scura also sat on the business review committee (the firm's investment banking screening committee) and was a member of the firm's operating council. He was a voting member of the investment committee of four separate private equity funds and Prudential Securities merchant banking fund, Prudential-Bache Interfunding. In February 1998, he joint ventured with the former EMI/Capitol Music chairman Charles Koppelman for musicians to cash in on music royalties.

== Biography ==
Scura received an A.B. degree in economics from Villanova University and an M.B.A. degree in finance from the Wharton School of the University of Pennsylvania.

Scura is a trustee of the Seton Hall Preparatory School, and sat on the Business Schools Advisory Board at Villanova University. Scura began his professional career with J.P. Morgan & Co. in 1975, where he spent 11 years in both New York and London. Scura is the co-founder along with former governor James Florio and Keith D. Sernick, former deputy treasurer of Nassau County, NY of Xspand, Inc., a consulting and applications software provider, which was acquired by Bear Stearns in 2006.

He currently is managing director of Dornoch Holdings, LLC, a real estate and development company which invests in special situation real estate opportunities. In 2001, he founded Scura Partners Securities LLC, a boutique investment bank in New York City.

He currently is the non-executive chairman of Private Club Links, LLC.

== See also ==
- Business magnate
- Entrepreneur
- Financier
- Industrialist
- Gender-neutral language
