= Thomas George Fahy =

American priest and school administrator (1922-1976)

Thomas George Fahy (1922 – October 27, 1976) was an American Catholic priest and academic administrator. He was the 14th President of Seton Hall University, serving from 1970 until his death in 1976.

== Early life and education ==
Fahy was born in 1992, in Jersey City, New Jersey. He attended Seton Hall Preparatory School and then Seton Hall College (since renamed as Seton Hall University) before studying at Immaculate Conception Seminary in Mahwah, New Jersey. He was ordained in 1947.

== Career ==
In the early 1950s, Fahy joined the faculty of Seton Hall Preparatory School as an instructor in Greek and Latin. He was the school's athletic director from 1949 to 1955. In 1963, he became the vice president in charge of instruction at Seton Hall. In May 1970, Fahy was chosen by the Seton Hall board of trustees to be the school's 14th president. Under Fahy, the school built several buildings and opened Seton Hall Law School in downtown Newark.

== Death ==
On July 24, 1976, Fahy suffered a heart attack. On October 27, 1976, Fahy died after he suffered another heart attack in his quarters on the Seton Hall campus.

== Awards and honors ==
Fahy was inducted into the Seton Hall University hall of fame in 1975.
