= Seton Hall University =

Catholic university in South Orange, New Jersey, US

- Former name: Seton Hall College (1856–1950)
- Motto: Hazard Zet Forward (Norman French/English)
- Motto in English: "Despite hazards, move forward"
- Type: Private research university
- Established: September 1, 1856; 170 years ago
- Founder: James Roosevelt Bayley
- Accreditation: MSCHE
- Religious affiliation: Catholic Church (Diocesan)
- Academic affiliations: ACCU; NAICU; Space-grant; IFCU
- Endowment: $388.4 million (2025)
- President: Joseph R. Reilly
- Provost: Erik Liliquist (interim)
- Administrative staff: 1,065
- Students: 9,529 (fall 2023)
- Undergraduates: 6,109 (fall 2023)
- Postgraduates: 3,420 (fall 2023)
- Location: South Orange, New Jersey, United States; 40.7417°N 74.2449°W
- Campus: 58 acres (0.2 km^{2}); Large suburb
- Newspaper: The Setonian
- Other campuses: Newark
- Colors: Pirate blue, gray, and white
- Nicknames: Pirates; The Hall
- Sporting affiliations: NCAA Division I - Big East; ACHA; CSCHC
- Mascot: Pirate
- Website: shu.edu

Seton Hall University (SHU) is a private Catholic research university in South Orange, New Jersey, United States. Founded in 1856 by then-Bishop James Roosevelt Bayley and named after his aunt, Saint Elizabeth Ann Seton, Seton Hall is the oldest diocesan university in the United States.

Seton Hall consists of 9 schools and colleges and has an undergraduate enrollment of about 5,800 students and a graduate enrollment of about 4,400. It is classified among "R2: Doctoral Universities – High research activity".

The university is known for its men's basketball team, which has appeared in 13 NCAA Division I men's basketball tournaments after making it to the final of the 1989 tournament and losing 79–80 in overtime to the Michigan Wolverines. The resulting increase in national television exposure has led to increasing numbers of applications from prospective students.

== History ==
=== Early history ===
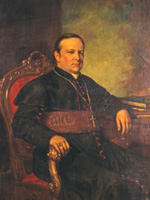
Founder Bishop James Roosevelt Bayley

Like many Catholic universities in the United States, Seton Hall arose out of the Council of Baltimore, held in Maryland in 1844, with the goal of bringing Catholicism to higher education in order to help propagate the faith. The Diocese of Newark had been established by Pope Pius IX in 1853, just three years before the founding of the college, and it necessitated an institution for higher learning. Seton Hall College was formally founded on September 1, 1856, by Newark Bishop James Roosevelt Bayley, a first cousin of James Roosevelt I, father of president Franklin Roosevelt. Bishop Bayley named the institution after his aunt, Mother Elizabeth Ann Seton, who was later named the first American-born Catholic saint.

The main campus was originally in Madison, New Jersey. Reverend Bernard J. McQuaid served as the first college president (1856–1857, 1859–1868) and directed a staff of four diocesan clergy including Reverend Alfred Young, vice-president; Reverend Daniel Fisher (the second college president, 1857–1859) and five lay instructors. Initially, Seton Hall had only five students – Leo G. Thebaud, Louis and Alfred Boisaubin, Peter Meehan, and John Moore. By the end of the first year, the student body had grown more than tenfold to 60. The college moved to its current location in 1860.

Postcard showing Stafford Hall, one of the first dormitories, in the late 19th century

By the 1860s, Seton Hall College was continuing its rapid growth and began to enroll more and more students each year. However, among other difficulties, several fires on campus slowed down the growth process. The first of several strange fires in the university's history occurred in 1867 which destroyed the college's first building. Two decades later on March 9, 1886, another fire destroyed the university's main building. In the 20th century, another campus fire burned down a classroom as well as several dormitory buildings in 1909.

During the 19th century, despite setbacks, financially tight times, and the American Civil War, the college continued to expand. Seton Hall opened a military science department (forerunner to the ROTC program) during the summer of 1893, but this program was ultimately disbanded during the Spanish–American War. Perhaps one of the most pivotal events in the history of Seton Hall came in 1897 when Seton Hall's preparatory (high school) and college (undergraduate) divisions were permanently separated.

James F. Kelley, then 33 years old, was appointed by Thomas J. Walsh of the Archdiocese of Newark to serve as president of Seton Hall College in July 1936, making him the nation's youngest college president. When he took office, Kelley led a liberal arts school that had an enrollment of 300. By 1937, Seton Hall established a University College. This marked the first matriculation of women at Seton Hall. Seton Hall became fully coeducational in 1968. In 1948, Seton Hall was given a license by the FCC for WSOU-FM. The construction of the Walsh Gymnasium began as part of a project initiated in 1939 that would cost $600,000 (equivalent to $13.9 million in 2025).

Kelley stepped down from office at Seton Hall in March 1949 in the wake of an investigation into the school by the federal government that looked into potential improper sales of war surplus equipment that had been given for the school's use. He was succeeded by John L. McNulty. Enrollment at the school had grown to 6,000 by the time Kelley left office.

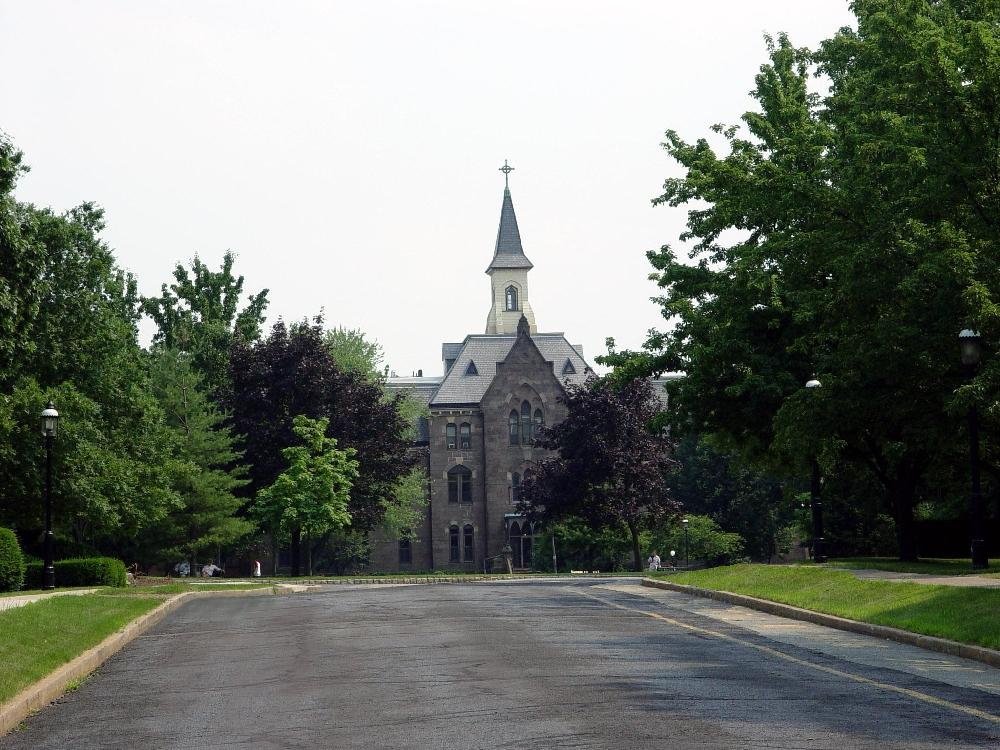
Presidents Hall, one of the university's oldest buildings

The college was organized into a university in 1950 following the unprecedented growth in enrollment. The College of Arts and Sciences and the schools of business, nursing, and education comprised the university; the School of Law opened its doors in 1951, with Miriam Rooney as dean of law.

=== College of Medicine and Dentistry ===
The Seton Hall College of Medicine and Dentistry was established in 1954 as the first medical school and dental school in New Jersey. It was located in Jersey City, adjacent to the Jersey City Medical Center, which was used for clinical education. Although the college, set up under the auspices of the Archdiocese of Newark, was a separate legal entity from the university, it had an interlocking board of trustees. The first class was enrolled in 1956 and graduated in 1960. The dental school also awarded its first degrees in 1960. From 1960 to 1964, 348 individuals received an M.D. degree. The college was sold to the state of New Jersey in 1965 for $4 million after the archdiocese could not support mounting school debt and renamed the New Jersey College of Medicine and Dentistry (which became the New Jersey Medical School, part of the University of Medicine and Dentistry of New Jersey). That entity became part of the Rutgers University system in 2013 and now exists as the Rutgers New Jersey Medical School. Seton Hall established a new School of Medicine in partnership with Hackensack University Health Network in 2015; however, in 2020, the medical school formally separated from Seton Hall becoming the independent Hackensack Meridian School of Medicine.

=== Modernization period ===
Beginning in the late 1960s and continuing in the next two decades, the university saw the construction and modernization of a large number of facilities and the construction including the library, science building, residence halls, and the university center. Many new programs and majors were inaugurated, as were important social outreach efforts. New ties were established with the private and industrial sectors, and a growing partnership developed with federal and state governments in creating programs for the economically and educationally disadvantaged.

The 1970s and 1980s continued to be a time of growth and renewal. New business and nursing classroom buildings and an art center were opened. In 1984, the Immaculate Conception Seminary returned to Seton Hall, its original home until 1926, when it moved to Darlington (a section of Mahwah centered on a grand mansion and estate). The Recreation Center was dedicated in 1987. With the construction of four new residence halls between 1986 and 1988 and the purchase of an off-campus apartment building in 1990, the university made significant changes to account for a larger number of student residents. Seton Hall is recognized as a residential campus, providing living space for about 2100 students.

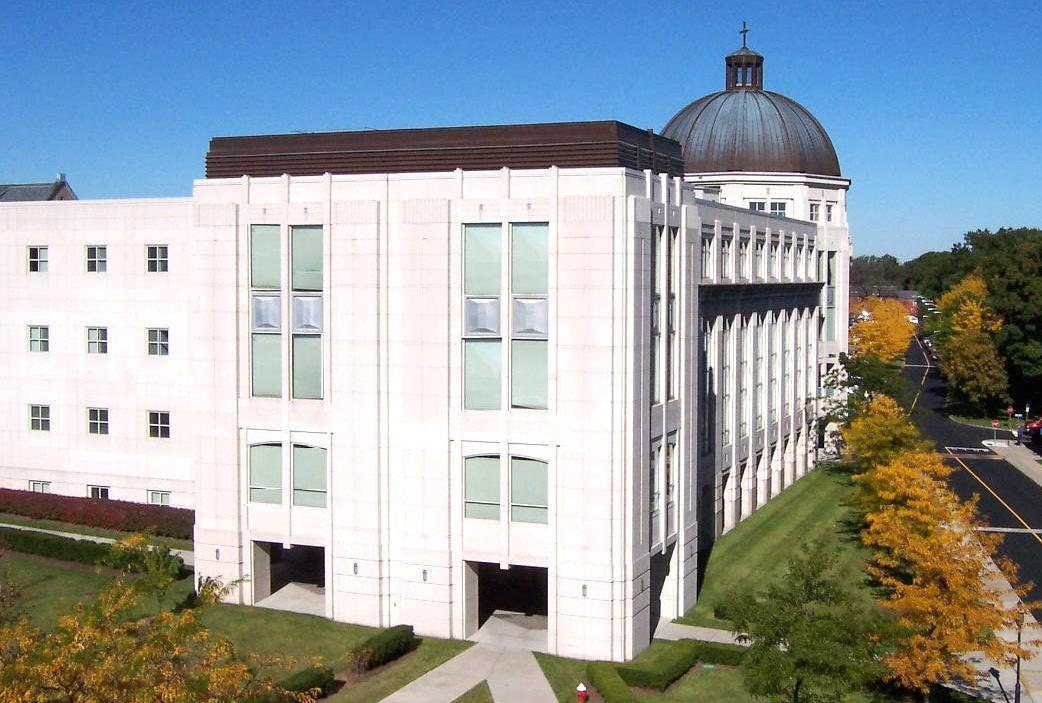
The Walsh Library in fall

The physical development of the campus continued in the 1990s. The $20 million Walsh Library opened in 1994, and its first-class study and research resources marked the beginning of a technological transformation of Seton Hall (current university library holdings are over 500,000 volumes). The university dedicated its newest academic center in 1997, originally named Kozlowski Hall for Dennis Kozlowski, former CEO of Tyco International. It was renamed Jubilee Hall following Kozlowski's criminal conviction in 2005. Its recreation center was originally named after Robert Brennan, but he was found guilty of securities fraud in 1994. It has since been renamed for athletic director Richie Regan.

=== Boland Hall fire ===
On January 19, 2000, an arson fire killed three and injured 54 students in Boland Hall, a freshman residence hall on the campus in South Orange. The incident, one of the deadliest in recent US history, occurred at 4:30 am, when most students were asleep. After a three-and-a-half-year investigation, a 60-count indictment charged two freshmen students, Sean Ryan and Joseph LePore, with starting the fire and felony murder for the deaths that resulted. LePore and Ryan pleaded guilty to third-degree arson and were sentenced to five years in a youth correctional facility with eligibility for parole 16 months after the start of their prison terms. Consequently, the student body dedicated an area in front of Boland Hall to those that suffered from the fire called "The Remember Seal" and stronger university fire safety precautions were instituted.

=== Sesquicentennial ===
On the 150th anniversary (1856–2006) of the university's founding, Seton Hall initiated the Ever Forward capital campaign to raise a total of $150 million. The campaign was the most prestigious building campaign in the university's long history. The funds were directed to many areas throughout the university, however a majority went toward building and reconstructing campus facilities and historic sites.

In fall 2007, the university opened the new $35 million Science and Technology Center, completing one of the major campaign priorities ahead of schedule. On December 17, 2007, the university announced that the campaign's fund raising goals had been met and exceeded more than two weeks ahead of the campaign's scheduled closing date.

=== 2010–present ===
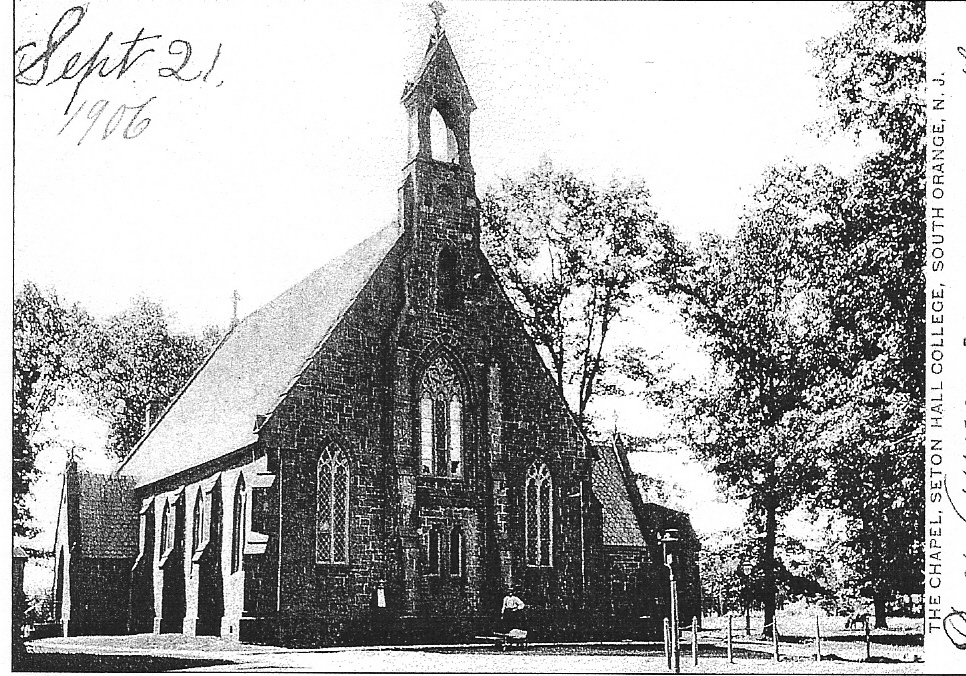
Immaculate Conception Chapel, built during the American Civil War

On April 30, 2010, the archbishop John J. Myers expressed concern about a planned offering of a course on same-sex marriage at Seton Hall University, saying it "troubles me greatly".

The university has completed a host of campus renovations and new construction while attracting more students. An initial round of improvements totaling nearly $100 million concluded in 2014 with the opening of a new fitness center, academic building, parking garage, and an expansion of the Aquinas Hall dormitory. A second round of construction is planned for 2016 and beyond, which will add the Visitors Hall.

Seton Hall announced the formation of two additional academic units in 2015 – the School of Medicine and the College of Communication and the Arts. The medical school was established in partnership with Hackensack Meridian Health, welcoming its first class in 2018. In 2020, the School of Medicine became the first independent medical school operating under Hackensack Meridian Health. The College of Communication and the Arts was a department in the College of Arts and Sciences before being elevated in the summer of 2015.

The university announced in December 2022 that employees in the law school had embezzled nearly $1 million. The school's dean resigned a month before this announcement. The following year, university president Joseph Nyre resigned in the wake of ongoing conflicts with the university's board of regents about the governance of the law school.. In 2024, a former assistant dean of the law school was sentenced to three years in federal prison for her involvement the embezzlement scheme.

== Governance ==
The university, legally incorporated as "Seton Hall University, an educational corporation of New Jersey", is governed by a 16-member board of trustees. Eleven members of the board serve on it as a virtue of their positions within the university or Archdiocese of Newark. The Archbishop of Newark, who serves as the president of the board, retains the power to appoint the remaining five members of the body. Appointed members of the board serve three-year terms, until their respective successor is appointed. The board of trustees exclusively maintains the property rights of the university and provides selection of title, scope, and location of the schools and colleges of the university.

The governance of the university includes a board of regents, which is charged with the management of the university. The board has a membership of between 25 and 39 members. Six of the members are ex-officio; the board of trustees maintains the right to elect up to thirty more. Regents maintain the exclusive hiring authority over the president of the university. Previous by-laws of the university stipulated that the president must be a Catholic priest.

== Campus ==
=== Main campus ===
A map from 1885 showing the Seton Hall College campus within the South Orange Village lines.

The main campus of Seton Hall University is situated on 58 acres (23 hectares) of suburban land on South Orange Avenue. It is home to nine of the 10 schools and colleges of the university. The South Orange Village center is just a 1/2 mile (0.80 km) west of the main campus. Directly across from the main campus to the northwest are scenic Montrose Park and the Montrose Park Historic District, which is listed in the National Register of Historic Places. The Eugene V. Kelly Carriage House, on the campus itself, is also NRHP-listed. The village itself dates back to 1666 preceding the establishment of Seton Hall College. Also since the beginning of the college, the South Orange Rail Station has served as an integral means to campus commuters. The main campus combines architectural styles including Roman, neo-Gothic and modern. The South Orange campus became a gated community during the university's Modernization Period.

=== Buildings ===
The original centerpieces of the campus were made up of three buildings built in the 19th century. Presidents, Stafford and Marshall Halls were built when the college moved from Madison to South Orange. Some of the more notable buildings on campus are:

- Presidents Hall – One of the oldest buildings on campus and a flagship of the university, Presidents Hall was completed in 1867. Located at the epicenter of the main campus, Presidents Hall is a neo-Gothic structure dressed in brownstone. It originally served as a seminary but now houses the university's administration including the Office of the University President. The halls are lined with portraits of past University presidents and include a large stained glass depicting Saint Elizabeth Ann Seton, which was commissioned in 1866 by President Bayley.
- Chapel of the Immaculate Conception – The handsome Gothic Revival brownstone building was designed by architect Jeremiah O'Rourke, who later designed the Cathedral of Newark. The chapel was built in 1863 and dedicated in 1870. Major renovations were completed in 1972 and most recently in 2008. The 2008 renovation was a primary component of Seton Hall's comprehensive Ever Forward fundraising campaign. In 2013, the chapel landed at No. 24 on Buzzfeed's survey of "31 Insanely Beautiful Colleges You Can Get Married At" and was ranked at No. 28 the following year on Collegeranker's list of "The 50 Most Beautiful College Campus Wedding Venues.
- Muscarelle Hall (formerly Stafford Hall) – In 2021, Stafford Hall was renamed to Muscarelle Hall after Sharon and Joseph L. Muscarelle Jr. The new academic building rose on the site of the former Stafford Hall in 2014. The outdated structure had been a campus fixture since the 19th century. Bearing the name of its predecessor, the new Stafford Hall features 12 classrooms of multiple sizes, nine of which can accommodate 35 students each, while the remaining rooms include two large classrooms that can hold 70 and 50 students apiece and one smaller room for 25 students.
- McQuaid Hall – Built around 1900, it was named for Bishop Bernard J. McQuaid, Seton Hall's first president from 1856 to 1857 and 1859 to 1867. McQuaid Hall was both a boarding house for students and a convent for nuns before serving its present purpose as the home of the School of Diplomacy and International Relations as well as the Seton Hall University School of Health and Medical Sciences.

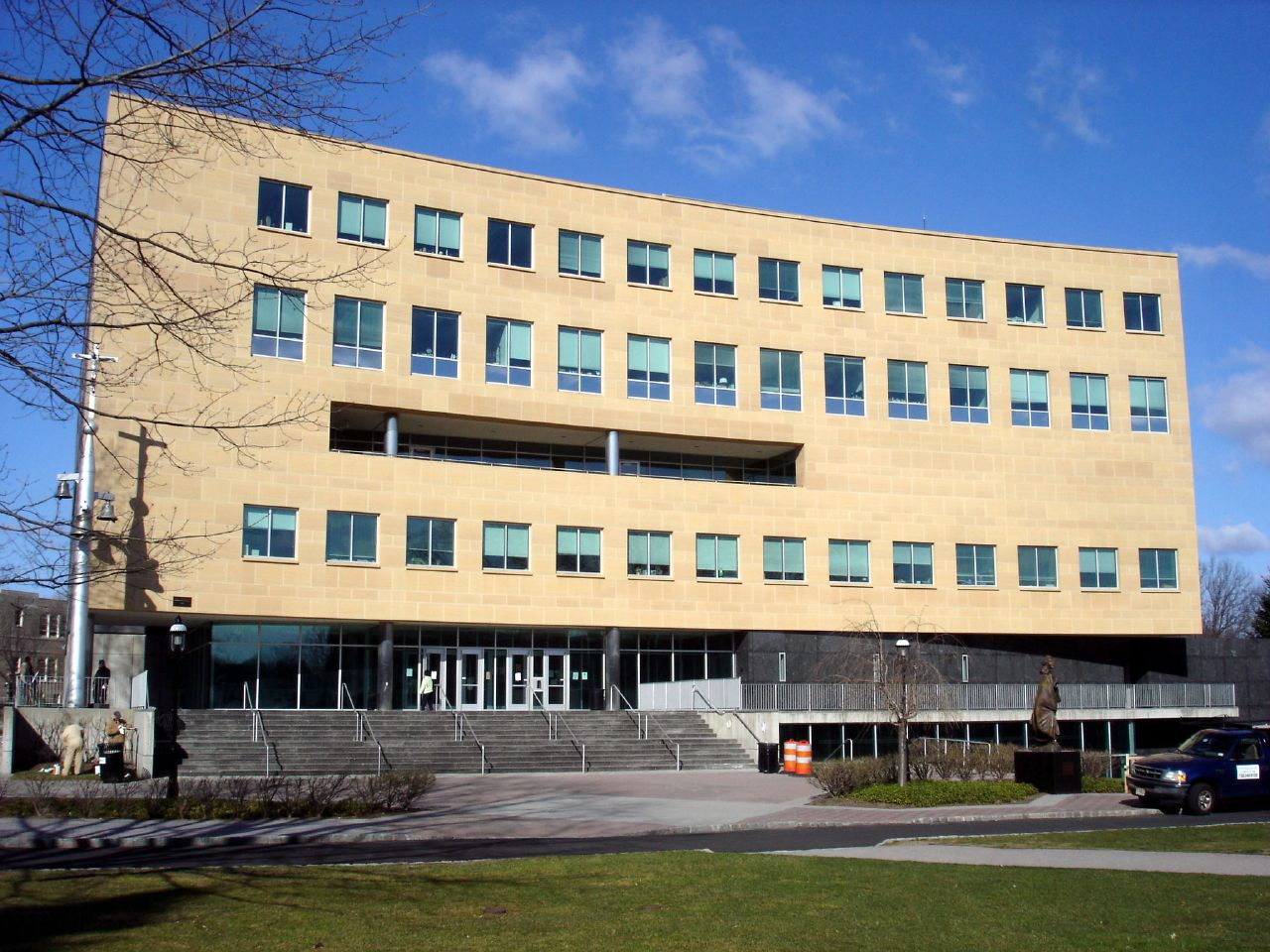
Jubilee Hall on the South Orange, New Jersey campus of Seton Hall University, is the home of the Stillman School of Business.

- Jubilee Hall houses the W. Paul Stillman School of Business in addition to the largest auditorium at the university. There are several computer labs, state-of-the-art classrooms and a Stock Exchange research room. The building was originally named Kozlowski Hall after Dennis Kozlowski, Seton Hall Alumni and former CEO of Tyco International. Following Kozlowski's conviction for securities fraud the building was renamed at his request to Jubilee Hall in honor of the Papal Jubilee. Built in 1997, it is one of the newer additions to the main campus.
- Walsh Gymnasium is a multi-purpose arena for University Sports. The arena opened in 1939 and can seat 2,600 people. It was home to the Seton Hall University Pirates men's basketball team before they moved to Continental Airlines Arena and then the Prudential Center. Currently, the arena hosts the women's basketball and volleyball teams, and is part of the Richie Regan Recreation and Athletic Center. The building, like the school's main library, is named for Thomas J. Walsh, Fifth Bishop of Newark and former president of the board of trustees.

McNulty Hall at night

- The Science and Technology Center (formerly McNulty Hall) – The building was originally named for Msgr. John L. McNulty, president of the university from 1949 to 1959, McNulty Hall was built as the university's technology and research center in 1954. One of the most famous features of the building is the Atom Wall, a relief artwork originally located on outer façade. Following renovations completed in the summer of 2007, the Atom Wall, depicting the gift of scientific knowledge from God to man, can be seen in the glass atrium of the building. McNulty also houses a large amphitheater and observatory for the chemistry, physics and biology departments.
- Fahy Hall – Built in 1968, the building houses the classrooms and faculty offices of the College of Arts and Sciences. The building was named after Monsignor Thomas George Fahy who served as president of the university from 1970 to 1976. Fahy Hall includes several student resources and facilities, including two television studios, two amphitheaters and laboratories for computing, language learning, and statistics.
- Arts and Sciences Hall and The Nursing Building – Originally built to house the Stillman School of Business in 1973, with the creation of Jubilee Hall in 1997, the building is now home to the College of Arts and Sciences in the West wing and the Caroline D. Schwartz College of Nursing in the East Wing. The College of Nursing has advanced teaching facilities including hospital beds, demonstration rooms and multi-purpose practice areas.
- Bethany Hall – The most recent addition to the campus, Bethany Hall, also known as the Welcome Center, opened in February 2018. It has event space that can hold 500–700 people and holds admissions offices.

=== Sustainability ===
Seton Hall's extensive recycling program is one of the highlights in the college's sustainability programming. Recycling is sometimes mandatory on campus as per New Jersey state laws. Additionally, Seton Hall celebrated Earth Day 2010, marking the event with demonstrations about composting and rainwater collection, a group hike, and an outdoor screening of the environmental documentary "HOME".

On the College Sustainability Report Card 2011, Seton Hall earned a grade of "B−". Lack of endowment transparency and green building initiatives hurt the grade, while the recycling programs were a plus.

=== Newark Campus ===
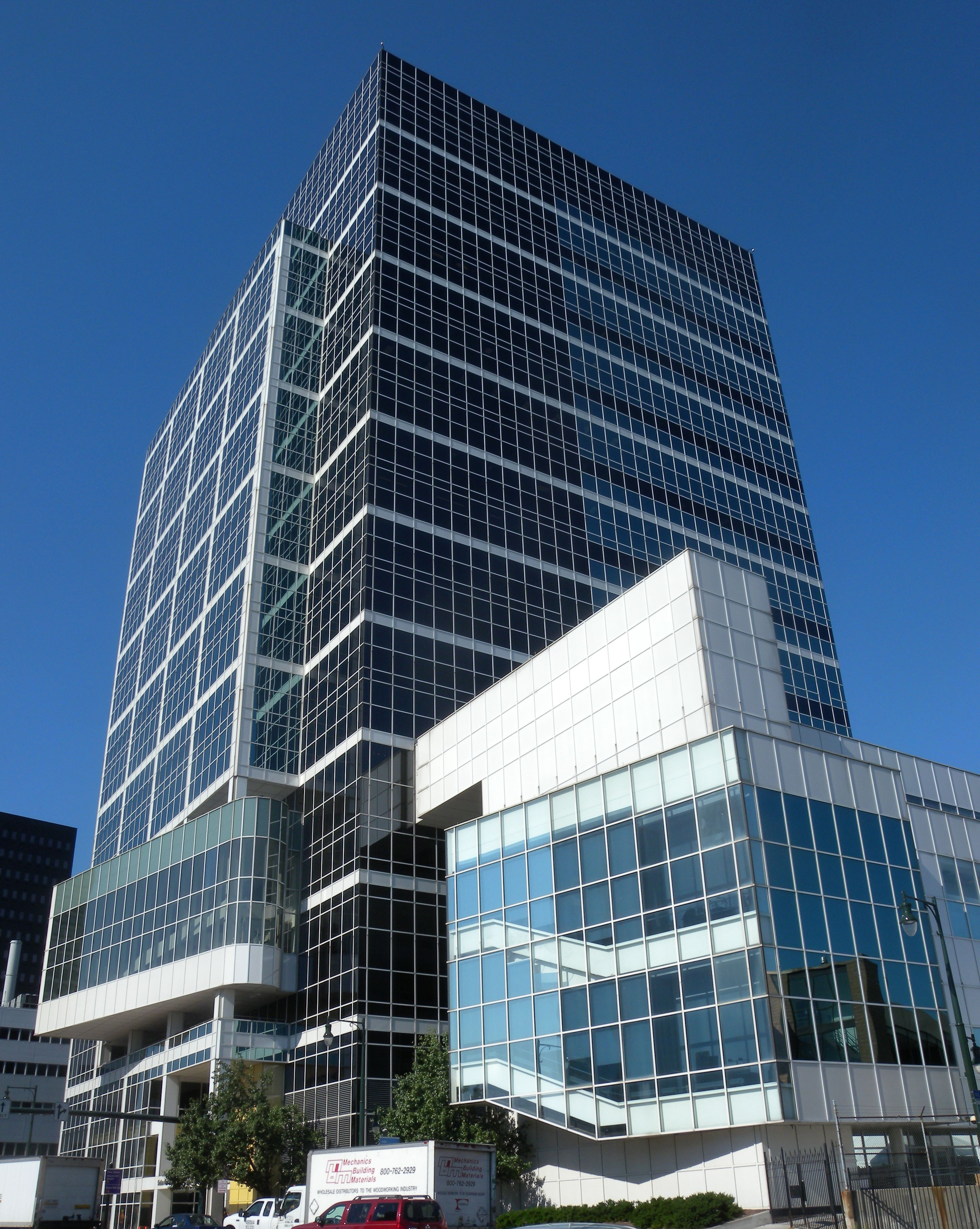
Seton Hall Law complex in Newark, New Jersey

A satellite of the main campus, the Newark Campus is home to the university's School of Law. Located at One Newark Center, the Law School and several academic centers of the university are housed in a modern 22-story skyscraper building. It is at the corner of Raymond Boulevard and McCarter Highway in the business and high-tech heart of downtown Newark, New Jersey and was completed in 1991. The Newark Campus building provides 210,000 square feet (20,000 m^{2}) and an additional 65,000 square feet (6,000 m^{2}) of library to the university.

The Seton Hall University School of Law was founded in 1951. It is accredited by the American Bar Association (ABA) since 1951 and is also a member of the Association of American Law Schools (AALS). Seton Hall is one of two law schools in the state of New Jersey. Seton Hall Law was founded by a woman, Miriam T. Rooney, who served as dean from 1951 to 1961. She was Seton Hall's first female dean. Dean Kathleen M. Boozang, who assumed the role in July 2015, is the third woman dean of Seton Hall Law.

=== Interprofessional Health Sciences Campus (IHS) campus ===
The IHS campus located in Nutley, New Jersey is dedicated to students seeking a career in health professions. The campus is home to the School of Health and Medical Sciences and the College of Nursing.

== Academics ==
Seton Hall University confers undergraduate and graduate degrees in as many as 70 academic fields. The school's academic programs are divided into nine academic units:

- College of Arts and Sciences (1856)
- Immaculate Conception Seminary School of Theology (1860)
- College of Nursing (1937)
- W. Paul Stillman School of Business (1950)
- School of Law (1951)
- School of Health and Medical Sciences (1987)
- Division of Continuing Education and Professional Studies (2005)
- School of Diplomacy and International Relations (1997)
- College of Human Development, Culture, and Media (2022) - Merging the College of Communication and the Arts (2015) and the College of Education and Human Services (1920)

=== Rankings ===
Academic rankings

National
- Forbes: 215
- U.S. News & World Report: 137
- Washington Monthly: 303
- WSJ/College Pulse: 279

Seton Hall University was ranked by U.S. News & World Report in 2025 as tied for 165th in the "National Universities" category. Seton Hall University School of Law was ranked tied at 70th best in the U.S. in 2022. The Stillman School of Business was ranked 65th of 114 undergraduate business schools in the nation by Bloomberg Businessweek in 2016.

== Student life ==
Student body composition as of May 2, 2022
Race and ethnicity	Total
White	51%
Hispanic	18%
Asian	11%
Black	8%
Other (Note: Other consists of Multiracial Americans and those who prefer to not say.)	8%
Foreign national	3%
Economic diversity
Low-income (Note: The percentage of students who received an income-based federal Pell grant intended for low-income students.)	26%
Affluent (Note: The percentage of students who are a part of the American middle class at the bare minimum.)	74%

=== Greek life ===
Twenty-four recognized fraternity and sorority chapters are chartered at Seton Hall. About 15 percent of the student body are members of a Greek-letter organization.

=== A cappella groups ===
- The Gentlemen of the Hall (all male)
- Seton Notes (co-ed)

=== Student media ===
The school's principal newspaper is The Setonian. The paper has school news, an entertainment section called "Pirate Life", sports, editorials, and an opinion section. The staff consists of undergraduates and publishes weekly on Thursday. The Stillman Exchange is the Stillman Business school's newspaper. Its stories cover ethical issues, business, and athletic stories. The Journal of Diplomacy and International Relations is a bi-annually published journal composed of writings by international leaders in government, the private sector, academia, and nongovernmental organizations. Undergraduate students studying Diplomacy and International Relations publish The Diplomatic Envoy, an international news and analysis paper that releases both weekly online and monthly print editions. The Liberty Bell, is the only political and independent newspaper on campus. Founded in 2007, it is published monthly and features news and op-ed articles about university, local, national, and international news with a focus on personal freedom. The Liberty Bell won the Collegiate Network's 2008–2009 award for Best New Paper, an award given to student newspapers no older than three years.

The Galleon Yearbook ceased publishing in the early 2000s. The original name of the Seton Hall University yearbook was title The White and Blue from 1924 to 1942, with the exception of 1940. No yearbooks were published from 1934 to 1938 or from 1943 to 1946. Publication resumed in 1947 under the title The Galleon but ceased in 2006.

WSOU is a college radio station broadcasting at 89.5 MHz FM. WSOU currently broadcasts in HD-RADIO. In 2007, the Princeton Review rated WSOU as the eighth-best college radio station in the nation.

=== Traditions ===
==== University seal ====
The university seal combines attributes from the Bayley coat of arms and the Seton family crest. The Seton crest dates back as early as 1216 and symbolizes Scottish nobility. Renowned crest-maker, William F. J. Ryan designed the current form of the Seton Hall crest, which is notable for its three crescents and three torteau. The motto on the seal Hazard Zet Forward (Hazard Zit Forward on some versions) is a combination of Norman French and archaic English meaning at whatever risk, yet go forward. Part custom and part superstition, students avoid stepping on an engraving of the seal in the middle of the university green. It is said that students who step on the seal will not graduate on time.

==== Alma mater ====
The Seton Hall University Alma Mater was adopted as the official song of Seton Hall University. Charles A. Byrne of the class of 1937 wrote the original lyrics in 1936 and the university adopted the alma mater during the 1937 school year when the dean first read it to the student body. Some students participate in the tradition of saying "blue and white" more loudly than the rest of the alma mater.

== Athletics ==
The 1908–1909 Seton Hall basketball team posted its first winning season when they went 10–4

The school's sports teams are called the Pirates. They participate in the NCAA's Division I and in the Big East Conference. The college established its first basketball squad in 1903.

Seton Hall athletics is best known for its men's basketball program, which won the 1953 National Invitation Tournament (NIT); were the 1989 NCAA tournament national runners-up following a defeat to Michigan in the final, 79–80 in overtime; and are New Jersey's most successful representative during March Madness by number of wins. Seton Hall also fields varsity teams in baseball, women's basketball, men's and women's cross country running, men's and women's golf, men's and women's soccer, softball, men's and women's swimming & diving, women's tennis, and women's volleyball.

Seton Hall also has club programs participating in ice hockey, rugby union, lacrosse, and men's volleyball and soccer. All Seton Hall sports have their home field on the South Orange campus except for the men's basketball team which currently plays at the Prudential Center in Newark after previously calling the Meadowlands home, and the club ice hockey team which plays at Richard J. Codey Arena in West Orange.

Seton Hall fielded its first varsity football program from 1882 until cancellation in 1932. The university later fielded a club football team from 1965 through 1972. In 1972, the football team won a national club championship. The next year, 1973, it was reinstated as a varsity program competing at the Division III level as the university aligned its other varsity teams with the original Big East Conference in 1979. Football was ultimately canceled after the 1981 season. During this final period of varsity football sponsorship, the team was coached by Ed Manigan.
