= Stormwater Pollution Prevention Plan =

The Stormwater Pollution Prevention Plan, often abbreviated as SWPPP or SW3P, is a plan created by constructors to show their plans for sediment and erosion control. Typically these plans are part of an overall design that details procedures to be followed during various phases of construction. This is required by a federal regulation of the United States of America governing stormwater runoff from active construction sites that are more than one acre in area. The SWPPP is considered a mitigation guideline for stormwater runoff from construction sites that have the potential to damage waterways while complying with the Clean Water Act's provisions and EPA regulations.
