= Troy CLE =

American novelist

Troy Tompkins
- Born: East Orange, New Jersey, U.S.
- Occupation: Novelist
- Writing career
- Pen name: Troy CLE
- Genres: Science fiction, fantasy
- Website: marvelousworld.com

Troy Tompkins, known as Troy CLE, is an American fiction writer from East Orange, New Jersey. He is the author of The Marvelous Effect, the first book in The Marvelous World Saga. The book follows young African-American Louis Proof. The book was released by Simon & Schuster and Random House on May 22, 2007. Tompkins is a graduate of Seton Hall Preparatory School and New York University (NYU).

His writing influences include hip hop, video games, anime, and science fiction

== Works ==
- The Marvelous Effect (2007)
- Olivion's Favorites (2009)
