= Jersey City Medical Center =

- RWJBarnabas Health

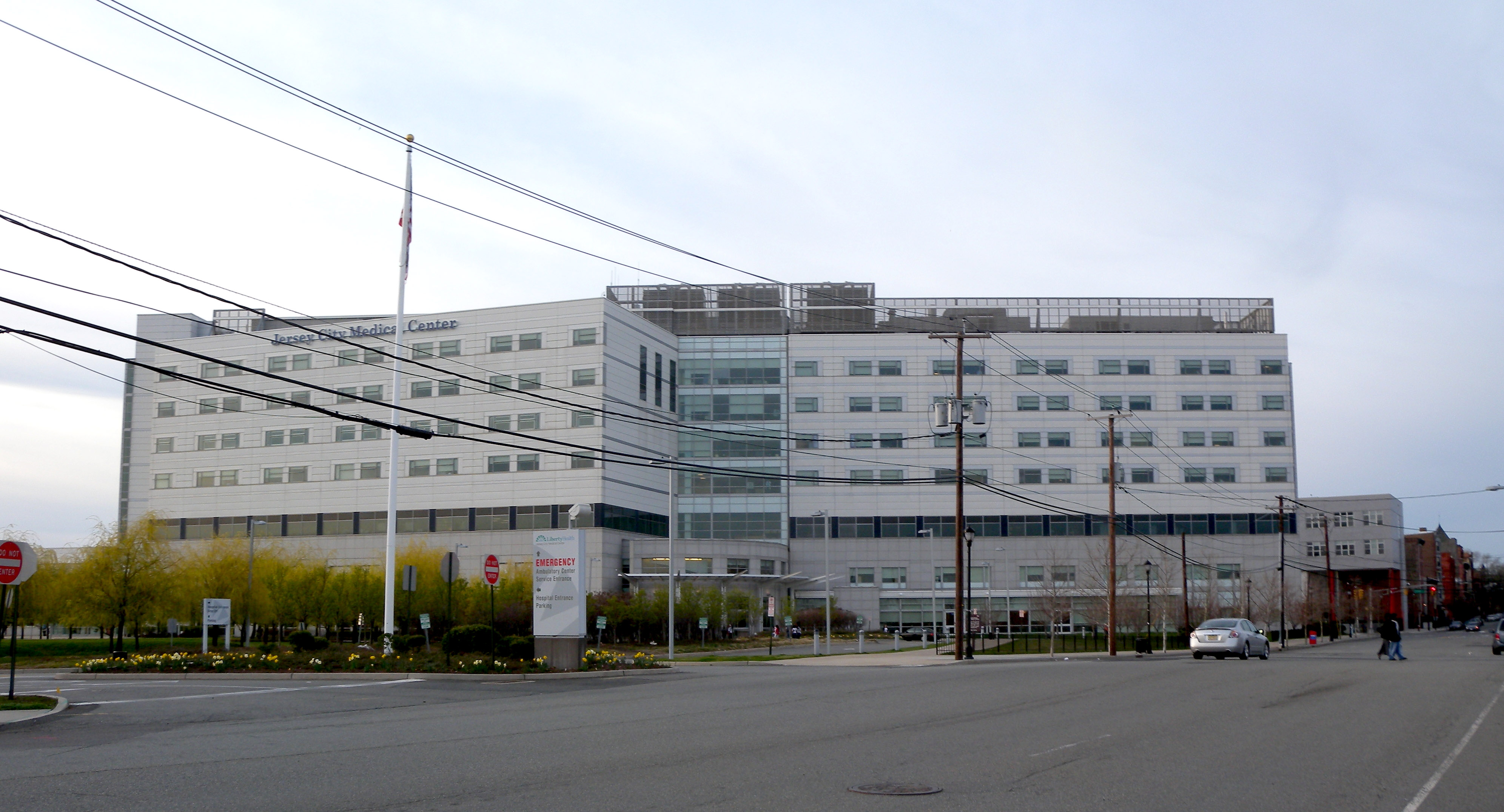
- The main building (Wilzig Hospital) as seen from Jersey Avenue

Geography
- Location: 355 Grand Street, Jersey City, Hudson County, New Jersey
- Coordinates: 40°42′58″N 74°3′1″W

Organisation
- Type: General

Services
- Emergency department: Level II Trauma Center

History
- Founded: 1882

Links
- Website: www.rwjbh.org/jersey-city-medical-center

The Jersey City Medical Center is a hospital in Jersey City, New Jersey. The hospital has had different facilities in the city. It is currently located on a 15-acre campus at Grand Street and Jersey Avenue overlooking New York Harbor and Liberty State Park. The campus includes three facilities: the Wilzig Hospital, the Provident Bank Ambulatory Center, and the Cristie Kerr Women's Health Center. The hospital serves as a regional referral and teaching hospital.

Jersey City Medical Center (JCMC) is a teaching affiliate and a member of Americas Essential Hospitals.

== History ==
The hospital began as the "Jersey City Charity Hospital" at the foot of Washington St. in Paulus Hook on December 15, 1868. In 1882, the Jersey City Board of Alderman bought land at an elevated location at Baldwin Avenue and Montgomery Street for a new hospital. The site was chosen to remove the hospital from the increasing industrial development on the waterfront at Paulus Hook. The new 200-bed facility opened in 1885 and was renamed the Jersey City Hospital. The city quickly outgrew the new hospital and in 1909, the original hospital building became a men's facility and a second wing was added for women patients.

In 1917, mayor Frank Hague planned an expanded facility that would attract the best physicians and staff for Jersey City residents. The original double-wing, six-story Jersey City Hospital was renovated and a 23-story structure was constructed for surgical cases that opened in 1931. The formal dedication of the new "Jersey City Medical Center Complex", the B. S. Pollack Hospital, was on October 2, 1936, with Franklin D. Roosevelt dedicating the building.

In addition to the surgery building and the maternity hospital, the campus included the nurses' residence (Murdoch Hall), hospital for chest diseases (Pollock), a psychiatric hospital, and an outpatient clinic. The Medical Center's services were free for Jersey City residents. From 1956 to 1968, JCMC was the home of the medical school of Seton Hall College of Medicine and Dentistry, the predecessor to the University of Medicine and Dentistry of New Jersey (UMDNJ) formerly located in neighboring Newark. The Art Deco buildings of the former JCMC complex were renovated and became The Beacon Jersey City in 2016.

Jersey City Medical Center was one of the first medical centers in the United States and the first in New Jersey. By the 1940s, the medical center had grown to become the third-largest medical center in the world. Many people in Northern New Jersey still call it “The Medical Center.” The hospital also has teaching affiliations with the New York College of Osteopathic Medicine and St. George's University School of Medicine.

In 2004, JCMC moved to new quarters at Grand Street and Jersey Avenue designed by Philadelphia A/E firm Ballinger and RBSD of New York. The campus is across the street from the Jersey Avenue station of the Hudson–Bergen Light Rail which provides connections to ferries to New York City, PATH trains and the Liberty Science Center. The facility, currently operated by RWJBarnabas Health, is the region's state-designated Level II trauma center and the only hospital in Hudson County to do open heart surgery. Several additional buildings are being planned for the site.

In 2022, the medical center opened a 60,000 sq ft (5,600 m^{2}) $100 million expansion of its Emergency Department that included a new pediatric emergency department.

== Current operations ==
JCMC received among the highest scores in Hudson County in the New Jersey Department of Health's 2009 Hospital Performance Report. The Center scored in the top 10 percent of hospitals in the state for their care of heart attacks, surgical improvements, and heart failure, receiving the second-highest score behind North Bergen's Palisades Medical Center. JCMC received a 95 in pneumonia treatment, 97 in heart attack, heart failure and surgical care, percentages that represent the number of patients treated properly and released.

The JCMC comprises two main hospital facilities, the Wilzig Hospital (named after Siggi Wilzig) and the Provident Bank Ambulatory Center.

While not directly connected to the JCMC, a 2.5-acre parcel owned by the city is planned to become a proton therapy treatment center, though the deal is contingent on tax-abatements the city is reluctant to give.

In October 2012 the JCMC announced that it would implement an on-line appointment service for non-threatening emergency room treatment, becoming the first hospital in the New York metro area to do so.

== Departments and centers ==
=== Behavioral Health Services ===
Inpatient Detoxification

Short-term acute private bed unit, led by a multi-disciplinary team. Patients receive a comprehensive assessment / care and discharge plan.

Psychiatric Emergency/ Screening

Located at the Jersey City Medical Center. Hudson County's designated Screening Center, offering six extended crisis evaluation beds, operates 24x7 providing psychiatric assessment and stabilization / referral as well as specialized psychiatric screening services for children, adolescents and adults.

Mobile Outreach

Located at the Jersey City Medical Center. Certified Screeners provide psychiatric screening in Hudson County and provide assistance with any trauma / emergency on a 24/7 basis. Outreach staff are stationed at the County Youth House, Jersey City Municipal Court and Hudson County Superior Court.

Acute Psychiatric and Detoxification Inpatient Care

Located at the Jersey City Medical Center. A psychiatric unit and detoxification unit are available 24x7. The closed acute section of the psychiatric unit is Hudson County's designated Short Term Facility. Admissions to the detoxification unit must meet ASAM criteria. A multi-disciplinary team provides a comprehensive assessment/treatment and discharge referral/linkage for all patients.

Partial Hospitalization Programs

Located at the Jersey City Medical Center. Day hospital services are available for children, adolescents, and adults. A Therapeutic Nursery is available for 3-5 year olds. Day and after-school partial hospital programs are available for children/adolescents with a serious emotional disorder. Two-day programs are available for adults: an Acute Partial Hospitalization Program for individuals being discharged from acute hospital stays as well as those needing a higher level of care to divert them from hospitalization, and a psychosocial rehabilitation program with specialized services for MICA patients.

Outpatient Programs

Located at the Jersey City Medical Center. A full range of services, individual, group, marital, family, psychological testing, and medication management are available for children, adolescents and adults who present with emotional, psychiatric, behavioral, interpersonal, or post traumatic issues. Anger management and Domestic Violence groups are available for men and women. Addiction treatment services and drug testing/monitoring are available for adults, including intensive outpatient groups, and after care. A School Based Clinic at Snyder High School provides onsite counseling services.

Integrated Case Management Services

Located at the Jersey City Medical Center. Hudson County's designated ICMS provider is available for Hudson County adults who have a serious psychiatric disorder and require assertive community outreach to assist with community stabilization.

Residential Services

Located at the Jersey City Medical Center. A 24x7 supervised 15 bed specialized residence, Liberty Park Residence, is available for long-term care for seriously disabled adults. A Supportive Housing Project assists adults with a psychiatric problem who want to live independently but require assistance.

Consultation and Education/ Traumatic Loss Program

Located at the Jersey City Medical Center.

=== Fannie E. Rippel Foundation Heart Institute ===
Cardiac services including:

- Angioplasty
- Diagnostic Cardiac Catheterization
- Echocardiograms
- Stress Testing
- Tilt Table
- Nuclear Medicine
- 64-slice CT Scan
- Intravascular Ultrasound
- Percutaneous Coronary Intervention
- Pacemaker & Implantable Cardioverter
- Defibrillator (ICD) Therapy
- Minimally Invasive Vein Harvesting
- Revascularization including on and off pump
- MAZE Procedure
- Aneurysm Surgery
- Mitral Valve Repair and Replacement

Additionally, this institute is the only center in Hudson County that provides:

- Cardiac Catheterization & Cardiac Surgery Center for the Diagnosis & Treatment of Cardiac Disorders
- Fully Licensed Angioplasty Program
- Full-Service Cardiac Surgery Program

=== Jersey City Medical Center at Greenville ===
Opened in 2019 at the former Greenville Hospital on Kennedy Boulevard in Greenville. The facility began as a small outpatient dispensary in 1898. The current building was completed in 1964, with a west wing added in 1971. The hospital became part of Liberty HealthCare System, the former JCMC parent, in 1990. After it closed, the building was used for two years as headquarters for Jersey City Medical Center's Emergency Medical Service. The building was later sold to Community Healthcare Associates, which renovated it and leased it back to the JCMC.

=== Jersey City Emergency Medical Services ===
History 1868 – Charity Hospital was Built in Jersey City

1882 – Jersey City Medical Center Moved to Montgomery and Baldwin

1883 – JCMC EMS Responded to 691 EMS Calls

1916 – JCMC EMS Responds to Black Tom Explosion

1919 – JCMC EMS begins utilizing Motorized Ambulances

1930 – JCMC EMS maintains a fleet of 11 ambulances and responds to a record 17,000 requests for aid

1978 – JCMC EMS is one of the nine original paramedic projects in New Jersey

1996 – Achieved Accreditation by the State of New Jersey for the EMT training program

2003 – Partnered with Hudson County Community College to establish an associate degree program in Pre-Hospital Medicine: Paramedic Science

2005 & 2007 – The American Heart Association Training Center successfully obtained American Heart Association accreditation in BLS, PALS, and ACLS

2006 – Implemented real time driver feedback system, Implemented nationally recognized System Status Management GPS Deployment Strategy

2007 – Designed the first in New Jersey "HeartSafe and Emergency Ready Communities", Implemented Electronic Scheduling

2008 – Created Operational Dashboard Reporting, Deployed MARVLIS system

2009 – Implemented electronic charting system, Began the process of certifying EMS Billing Employees through the National Academy of Ambulance Coding

2010 – Achieved Accreditation from the Commission on Accreditation of Ambulance Services (CAAS), Achieved Accreditation by the Commission of Accreditation of Allied Health Education Programs (CAAHEP), Achieved Accredited Center of Excellence from the National Academy of Emergency Dispatch, Jersey City Medical Center EMS Department maintains a fleet of 35 emergency vehicles and responds to more than 90,000 incidents a year

== Hospital rating data ==
The HealthGrades website contains the clinical quality data for Jersey City Medical Center, as of 2018. For this rating section clinical quality rating data, patient safety ratings and patient experience ratings are presented.

For inpatient conditions and procedures, there are three possible ratings: worse than expected, as expected, better than expected. For this hospital the data for this category is:

- Worse than expected - 5
- As expected - 20
- Better than expected - 2

For patient safety ratings the same three possible ratings are used. For this hospital they are"

- Worse than expected - 2
- As expected - 11
- Better than expected - 0

Percentage of patients rating this hospital as a 9 or 10 - 67% Percentage of patients who on average rank hospitals as a 9 or 10 - 69%

== See also ==
- Seton Hall University
