= Reijn =

Reijn or van Reijn is a Dutch surname. Notable people with the surname include:

- Halina Reijn (born 1975), Dutch actress, writer and film director
- Theo van Reijn (1884–1954), Dutch sculptor
