= Joop Beljon =

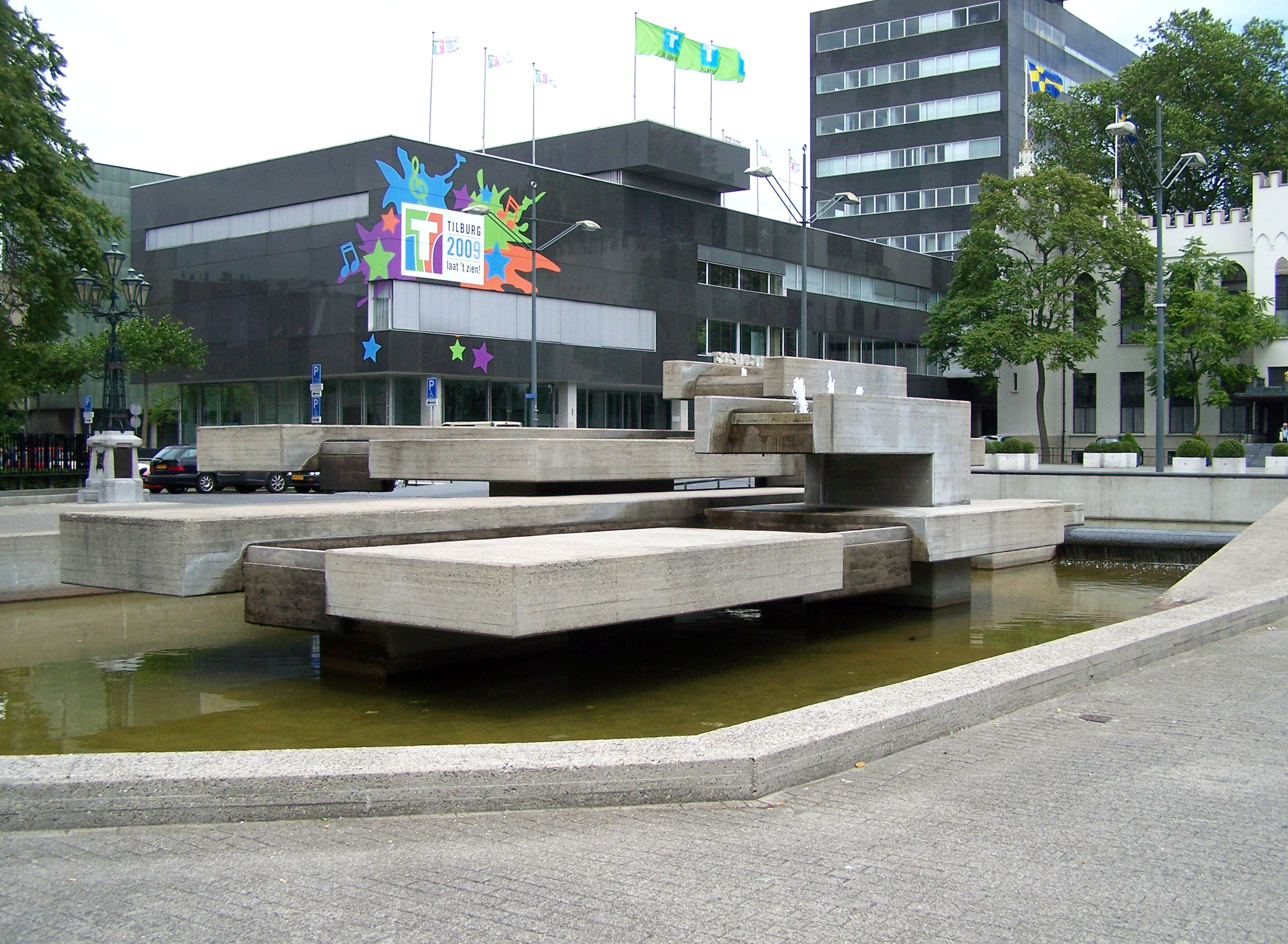
Fountain (1972), Willemsplein Tilburg

Johannes Jacobus (Joop) Beljon (11 January 1922 - 12 December 2002) was a Dutch artist, academy lecturer, director of academy and writer. As artist he was active as sculptor, fiber artist, lithographer, jeweler, environmental artists, and jewelry designer. Under the name J.J. Beljon and the pseudonym Bernard Majorick, Beljon was also writer. Beljon had taken over that pseudonym from the writer Godfried Bomans.

== Biography ==
Beljon was born in Schoten (Haarlem) in 1922. His father was a blacksmith, who had worked at Walden commune of Frederik van Eeden in Bussum. Beljon began his secondary education at the Triniteitslyceum at the Zijlweg in Haarlem. In Haarlem he dropped out to become a pupil of the sculptor Theo van Reijn, and of the painter, draftsman Floris de Groot. At age 18 these educational opportunities for Beljon were interrupted by the Nazis' 1940 invasion of the Netherlands. After the Nazi’s invaded, Beljon became part of a resistance group called onderduikers (the hidden). Beljon went into hiding and attempted to interrupt Nazi activity by forging travel documents for the Dutch. After the Allied Forces relieved the Netherlands in 1945, Beljon worked at a stoneyard.

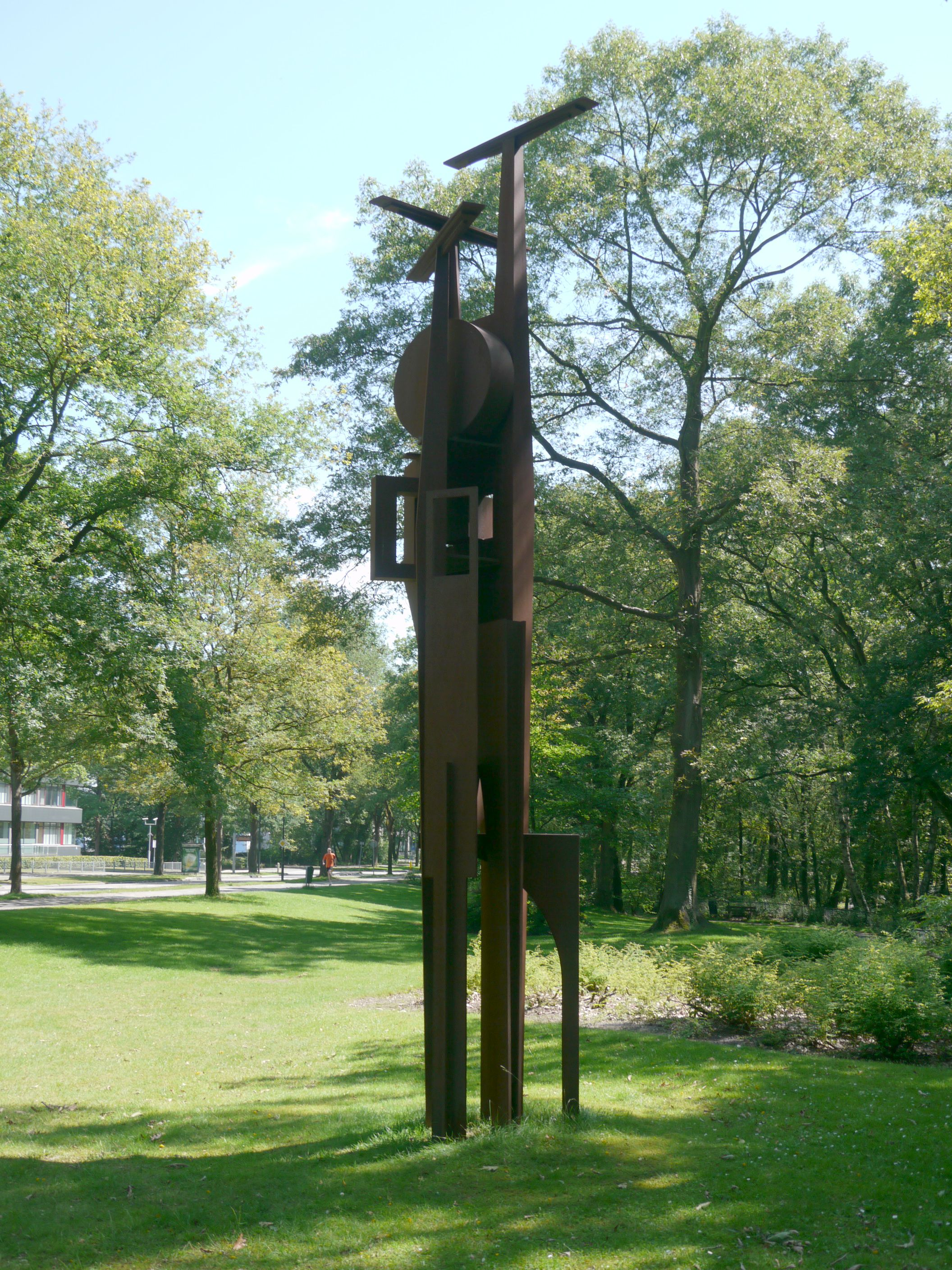
De Versmelting (1999), Apeldoorn

Beljon settled as independent artist in Haarlem, and later moved to Haarlemmermeer in the 1940s. In 1948, he was listed as one of the foremost Dutch contemporary sculptors in a publication by Theo van Reijn. In 1960, he moved to The Hague, where from 1961 to 1985 he served as director of the Royal Academy of Art, The Hague. At the art academy, he also lectured environmental design from 1978 to 1980, and design from 1978 to 1980. In 1969, he had moved his art studio to Capelle aan den IJssel, and in 1993 to Oud-Beijerland. He made study trips to Italy and Switzerland.

In 1998, he received the lifetime achievement award for Dutch sculpture, the Wilhelmina-ring, for which he was commissioned a sculpture in the Sprengenstein Park in Apeldoorn (see image). Beljon was married to Gabriëlle Dernison, and died in Oud-Beijerland on 12 December 2002.

== Work ==
Beljon has described himself as an integrationist. Beljon was an environment artist and he worked extensively with architects on projects commissioned by the Government Buildings Agency, among others in The Hague, Arnhem, Apeldoorn, Nijmegen, Groningen and Utrecht.

He carried out work in various countries, such as:

- United States: Homage to Sam Rodia (1965), campus California State University - Long Beach (painted white concrete, 19-piece and 4 to 5 meters high).

Beljon, as a writer and integrationist, has referenced multiple inspirations for his work “Homage to Sam Rodia”. Sam Rodia is obviously one influence. In the months prior to Beljons arrival in Long Beach, Rodia had died. Beljon was excited by Rodias spontaneous and intuitive process which he employed in creating the design for this wall. There is a detail in a niche of the wall of two interlocked rococo style hearts that are a motif in Rodia’s work Nuestro Pueblo. Rodia’s famous Watt’s Towers are not far from Long Beach. According to Beljon, this work was done in the spirit of the great American authors. Beljon also said that he was inspired by light on the streets of New York. Homage to Sam Rodia is made of 19 concrete pieces, each individually named by Beljon. The curtain of concrete is spread over 60 meters/ 395 feet in length and weighs roughly 260 tons.

- Mexico: Tertulia de los Gigantes (1968) in Mexico City (7 brightly colored concrete towers); sculpture Al Alimon (2001) on the island of Isla Mujeres and sculpture Caballo Negro (posthumous, 2003) in Chetumal, capital of Quintana Roo on the peninsula of Yucatán.
- Bahrain: three gardens, fountains and pool annex (1981) in Bahrain.
- Israel: plastic Dukdalf (1984), Shaltielgebouw in Jerusalem (project with other artists such as Sheila Hicks and Alexander Calder).

== Gallery ==
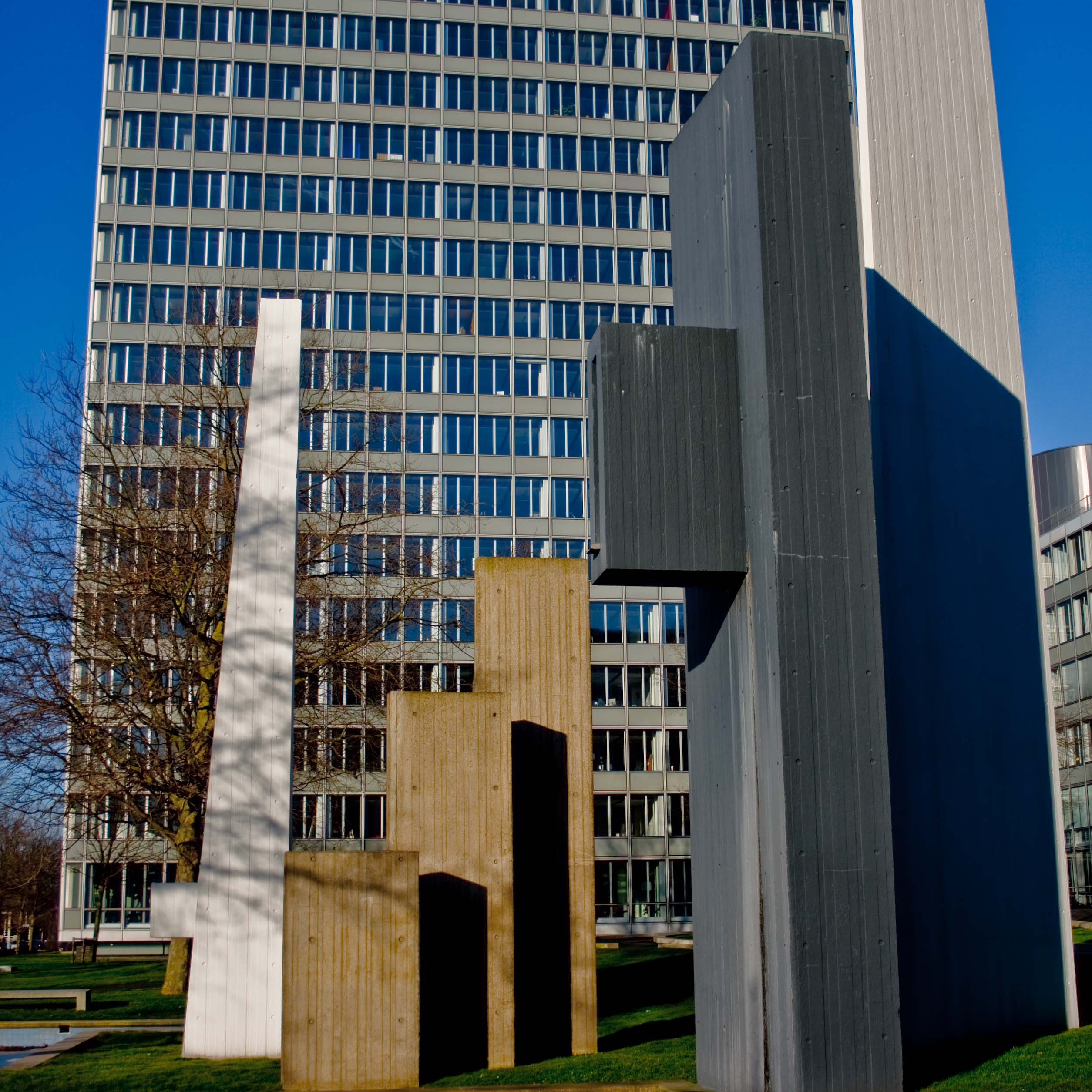
Monument Rijkswaterstaat in Den Haag

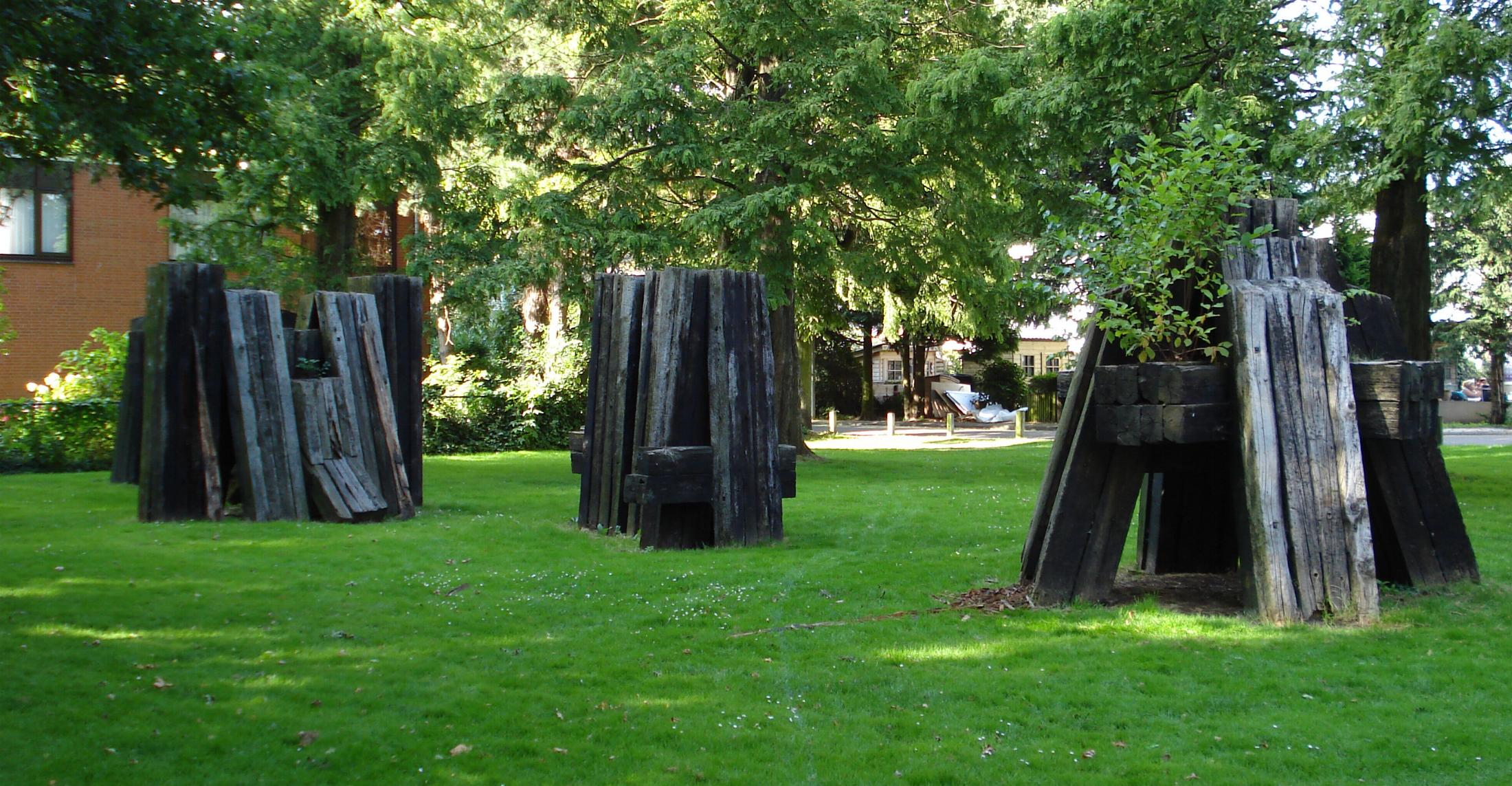
Acht objecten in Den Haag

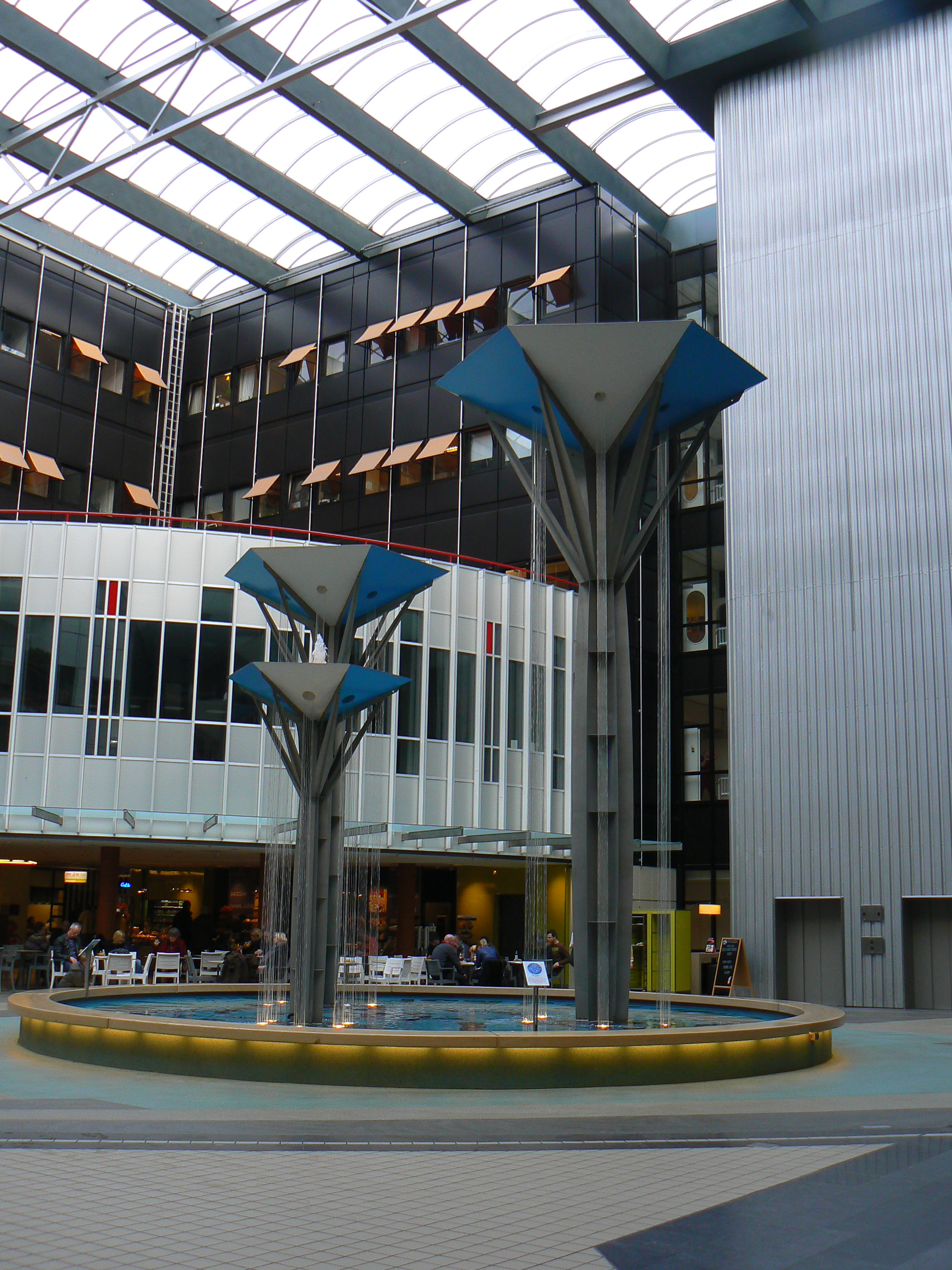
Fonteinplastiek (1992) in Groningen

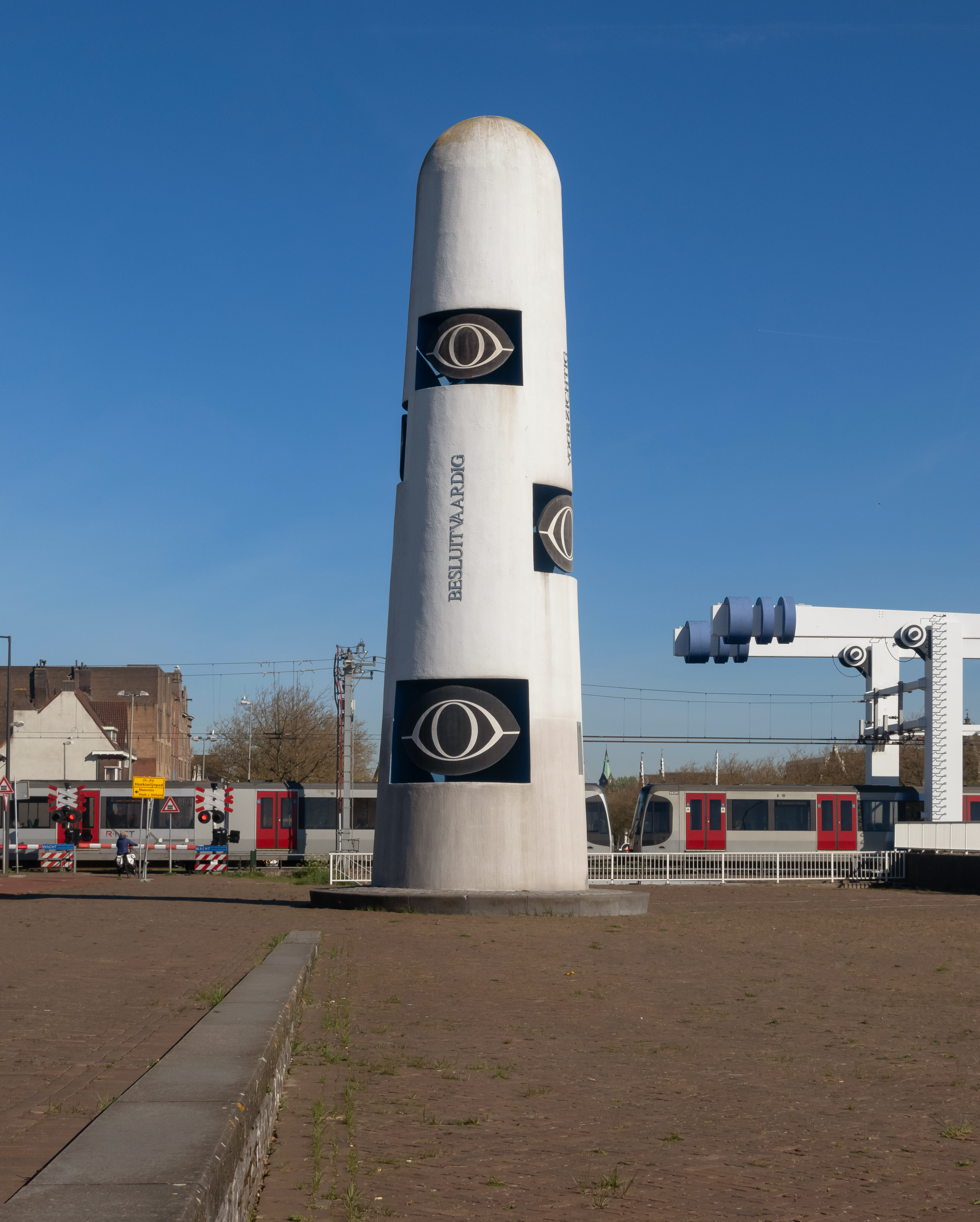
Pilaar met de wakende ogen (1993), Vlaardingen
