= Tirzo Martha =

Curaçaoan artist (born 1965)

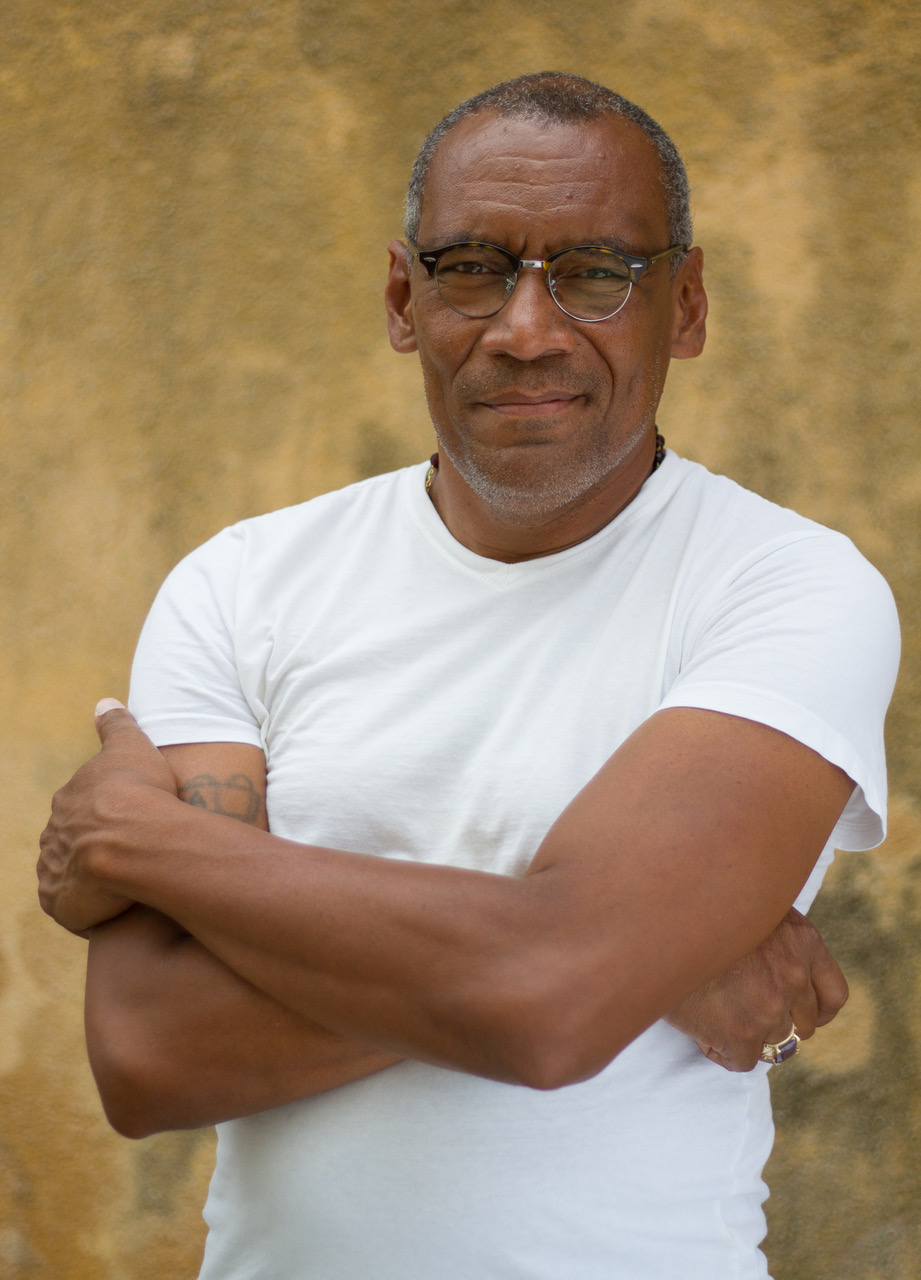
- Tirzo Martha in 2017
- Born: 16 June 1965; Willemstad, Curaçao
- Known for: Tronie van Sideron (2017); Monument van het Samen (2017)
- Awards: Wilhelmina-ring (2019), Cola Debrotprijs (2009)

Tirzo Martha is a Dutch visual and performance artist living and working in Curaçao.

== Early life and education ==
Martha grew up in a socially engaged family in the Buena Vista neighborhood. Even as a child he responded critically to conditions in his neighborhood and shared his food with friends who had none. He studied at the Akademia di Arte Korsou in Curaçao (1983-1986), at the Utrecht School of the Arts (Hogeschool voor de Kunsten Utrecht) (1986-1989), and at Frans Molenaar's fashion school (1989-1991). In 1991 he returned to Curaçao.

== Artistic career ==
Martha's drive to make art stems from his humanitarian and social engagement. In his sculptures, installations and performances he brings different communities together: in his installations he uses all kinds of materials and everyday objects, holding up a mirror of society's socio-political condition to the viewer; in his performances he brings to life the hero Captain Caribbean, who fights for justice, equality and a sustainable society.

Tirzo Martha is an artist who works with many mediums. He works with sculpture and video for his installations as well as performing in his own performance art. He accumulates many different objects to use for his artworks. Some of the objects he uses are concrete blocks, corrugated iron, wood, grout tubs, reinforcement baskets, car tires, tins, buckets, cages, lamps, straps, chairs and toilet bowls. These objects pay homage to his home country, Curaçao.

=== Instituto Buena Bista, Curaçao Centre for Contemporary Art ===
In 2006, Martha partnered up with artist David Bade and founded the Instituto Buena Bista (IBB), Curaçao Centre for Contemporary Art, of which they are both directors. The IBB is a preparatory program for young people (aged 14 to 25) who aspire to further education at an art academy or another creative program. The IBB also runs four artist-in-residence programs and organizes numerous socio-cultural projects, exhibitions and lectures. The students are taught on a college level through a master to apprentice approach to learn the lifestyle of a working artists.

== Works ==
On the occasion of Queen Beatrix's 25th anniversary on the throne, Tirzo Martha designed the 5- and 10-guilder coins of the Netherlands Antilles, minted in 2005.

In 2010 he was a guest artist during the First Trienniale of Caribbean Art at the Museo de Arte Moderno, Dominican Republic. As a guest lecturer he worked at, among others, the Sandberg Institute, Leiden University, the University of Curaçao, the University of Bordeaux Montaigne, the University of Lisbon, the Witte de With Center for Contemporary Art, the Royal Academy of Art in The Hague, and the Utrecht School of the Arts.

Martha participated twice in the Havana Biennale: in the 10th edition in 2009, and in the 12th edition in 2015, together with David Bade. In 2011-2012 he took part in the exhibition The Global Contemporary. Art Worlds after 1989 at ZKM Karlsruhe, part of the research project Global Art and the Museum. The project's aim was to decenter the Western art world and make new, parallel art worlds in Asia, Africa, the Middle East, Latin America and the Caribbean visible. The list of participants included more than a hundred international artists. Martha's participation as one of the relatively few artists chosen to represent the Caribbean region was a mark of recognition within that theoretical framework.

For the exhibition Open at Museum de Fundatie, Zwolle, in 2015–2016, Martha and other artists created works based on the lyrics of the songs on the album of the same name. In 2017 his installations were displayed in the exhibition Afrikaanse Bedienden aan het Haagse Hof ("African Servants at the Court of The Hague") at the Haags Historisch Museum, the major solo exhibition No Excuses at museum Beelden aan Zee, All You Can Art II at the Kunsthal, and Black Rebels, V2 at the International Film Festival Rotterdam. No Excuses was nominated for the Exhibition of the Year award.

In 2019 Martha's work De dematerialisatie van de vijf geboden in de vijf zintuigen ("The Dematerialization of the Five Commandments in the Five Senses") was installed in front of The Hague city hall. Overcoming Ourselves in Order to Overcome, from 2020, was his second work in a public space in the Netherlands. For the sculpture exhibition ARTZUID 2021 he made two sculptures. Together with David Bade he worked on the project Look at Me Now, contributing to the exhibition on slavery at the Rijksmuseum in 2021. They invited all visitors to jointly create ten new artworks based on the stories from the exhibition.

At the invitation of the Dutch Senate, he created the artwork Zitten, zat, gezeten, nu ga ik staan! ("To Sit, Sat, Seated, but Now I'm Going to Stand up!"), made of more than a hundred chairs on the theme of "Reflection," on the Plein in The Hague in May 2023, on the occasion of the renovation of the Binnenhof. For ARTZUID 2023 he and David Bade created the work Another Blòki in the Wall.

In 2024 the exhibition Intensive Care at Museum van Bommel van Dam featured an extensive series of largely white installations devoted to societal problems. They are part of the series Chronisch Monochroom ("Chronic Monochrome"), the idea for which arose during Martha's stays in hospitals in Colombia and Curaçao.

In 2025 Martha led the collective performance Act of Valor by Caribbean artists at the Pérez Art Museum Miami. That same year he was also a guest curator of the two-person exhibition Aan de andere kant van de oceaan ("On the Other Side of the Ocean") at Museum Schunck, where the work of Charles Eyck and Rinella Alfonso were shown together for the first time.

Besides Curaçao and the Netherlands, Tirzo Martha's work has also been exhibited in the United States, Germany, France, Italy, Portugal, Martinique, Argentina, Brazil, the Dominican Republic and Cuba.

== Solo exhibitions ==
- 2025 - CODA Museum, Apeldoorn
- 2024 - Intensive Care, van Bommel van Dam Museum, Venlo, The Netherlands
- 2023 - Zitten, Zat, Gezeten, Nu Ga Ik Zwemmen! Museum Beelden Aan Zee, The Hague, The Netherlands
- 2023 - Zitten, Zat, Gezeten, Nu Ga Ik Staan! The Hague, The Netherlands
- 2022 - Chronisch Monochroom, Museo di Kòrsou, Curaçao
- 2022–2023 - The Oceans and the Interpreters, Hong-Gah Museum, Taipei
- 2020 - Het Huis Dat Nooit Af Is, CODA Museum, Apeldoorn, The Netherlands
- 2020 - Paris Fashion Week
- 2017 - 'Tirzo Martha, No Excuses', Museum Beelden Aan Zee, The Hague, The Netherlands
- 2011 - Afro Victimize, The Patricia & Phillip Frost Art Museum, Miami
- 2011 - The Global Contemporary. Art Worlds after 1989 at ZKM Karlsruhe, Germany
- 2010 - San Juan San Pedro, Centre For Contemporary Art, Dordrecht, The Netherlands
- 2010 - Performance Captain Caribbean, The Conquest of the Netherlands, Amsterdam
- 2010 - Performance Captain Caribbean, The Initiation of Captain Caribbean, National Heroes Park, Kingston
- 2008 - The Republic of the Caribbean, Instituto Buena Bista, Curaçao
- 2006 - Made in Curaçao with a Dutch Component, intervention
- 20)4 - Digestion, Art Studio Insight, Aruba
- 2003 - Destiny; Shunning the Journey, BCN Art Directe, Barcelona
- 2002 - De Drenkeling ("The Drowned Man"), Center for Contemporary Art (CBK), Dordrecht

== Awards ==
In 2009 Martha won the Cola Debrotprijs. In 2019 he received the eleventh Wilhelmina-ring for his entire body of work. The prize came with, among other things, an exhibition at the CODA Museum and a commission to realize an artwork in the Sprengenpark in Apeldoorn. The exhibition Het Huis Dat Nooit Af Is, running from 6 September to 6 December 2020, showed seven installations from his body of work. The work Overcoming Ourselves in Order to Overcome was created in collaboration with nine residents of Apeldoorn and was installed in the Sprengenpark on 9 December 2020. At the end of 2021, a primary school in the Buena Vista neighborhood based on the "Integraal Kindcentrum" (Integrated Child Center) education model was named after him.

== Bibliography ==
- Rob Perrée (ed.) (2017). Tirzo Martha. I Wonder If They'll Laugh When I'm Dead. Jap Sam Books. ISBN 978-94-90322-88-5. (Best Dutch Book Design award, 2017[24][25])
- Tirzo Martha, Sjors Bindels, Adi Martis, Rob Perrée (July 2024). Chronic Monochrome. Jap Sam Books. ISBN 978-94-93329-18-8.
- (nl) Michiel van Kempen, "Papiamentu – Met heel haar klankenweelde, is geen vreugde of verdriet voor mij onzegbaar" ("Papiamentu – With all its wealth of sound, no joy or sorrow is unspeakable to me") in: Zwarte Pracht; Cultuur uit de voormalige Nederlandse koloniën ("Black Splendor; Culture from the former Dutch colonies"). Amsterdam: Uitgeverij Van Oorschot, 2025, pp. 207–214, ISBN 9789745242326. (On the work Protehá e Wardador, with image.)

== Works ==
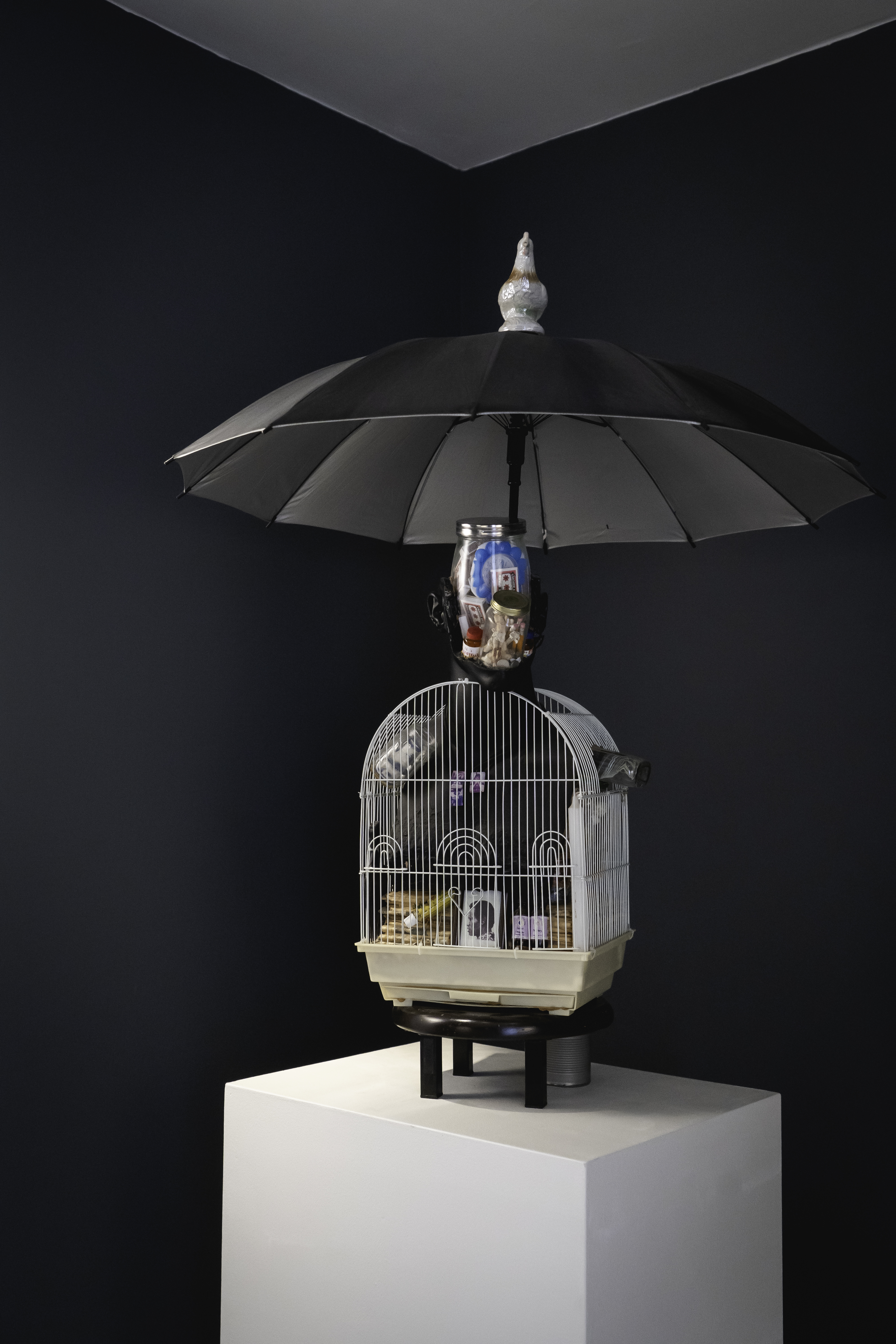
Protehá e Wardador / Protect the Protector (2009)

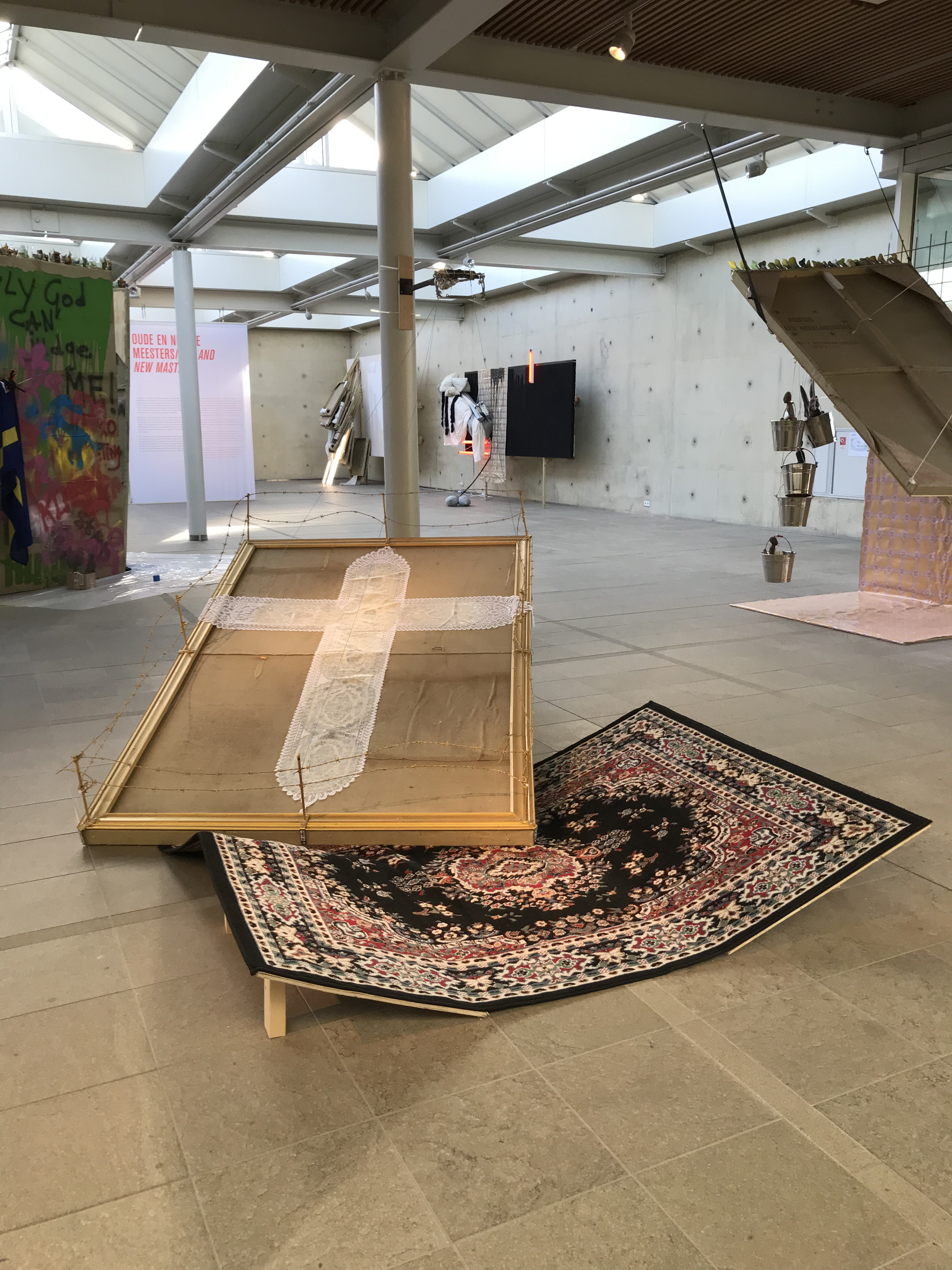
The banned partnership (2015)

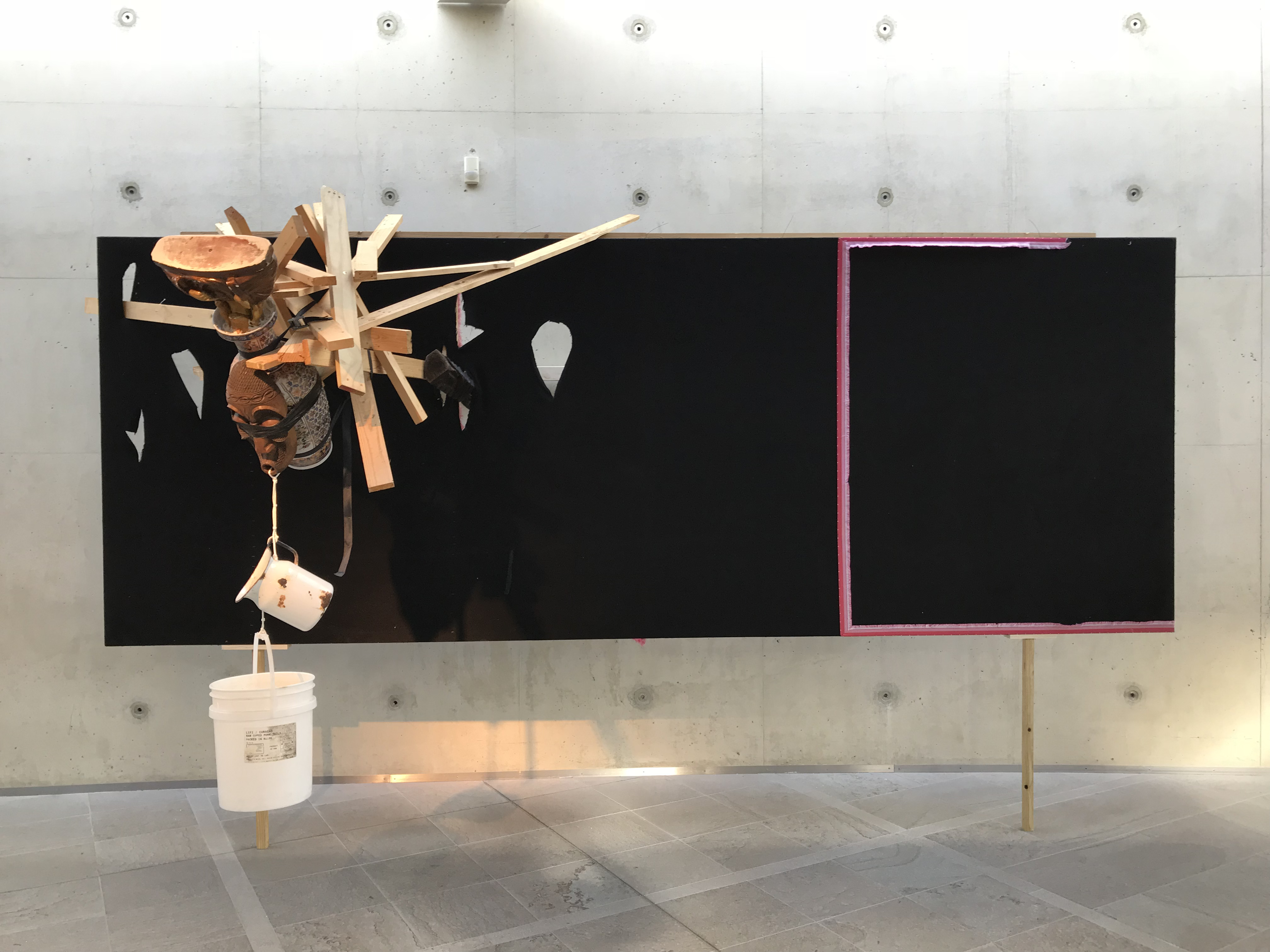
Ai Wei Wei sate batata hopi saus (2016)

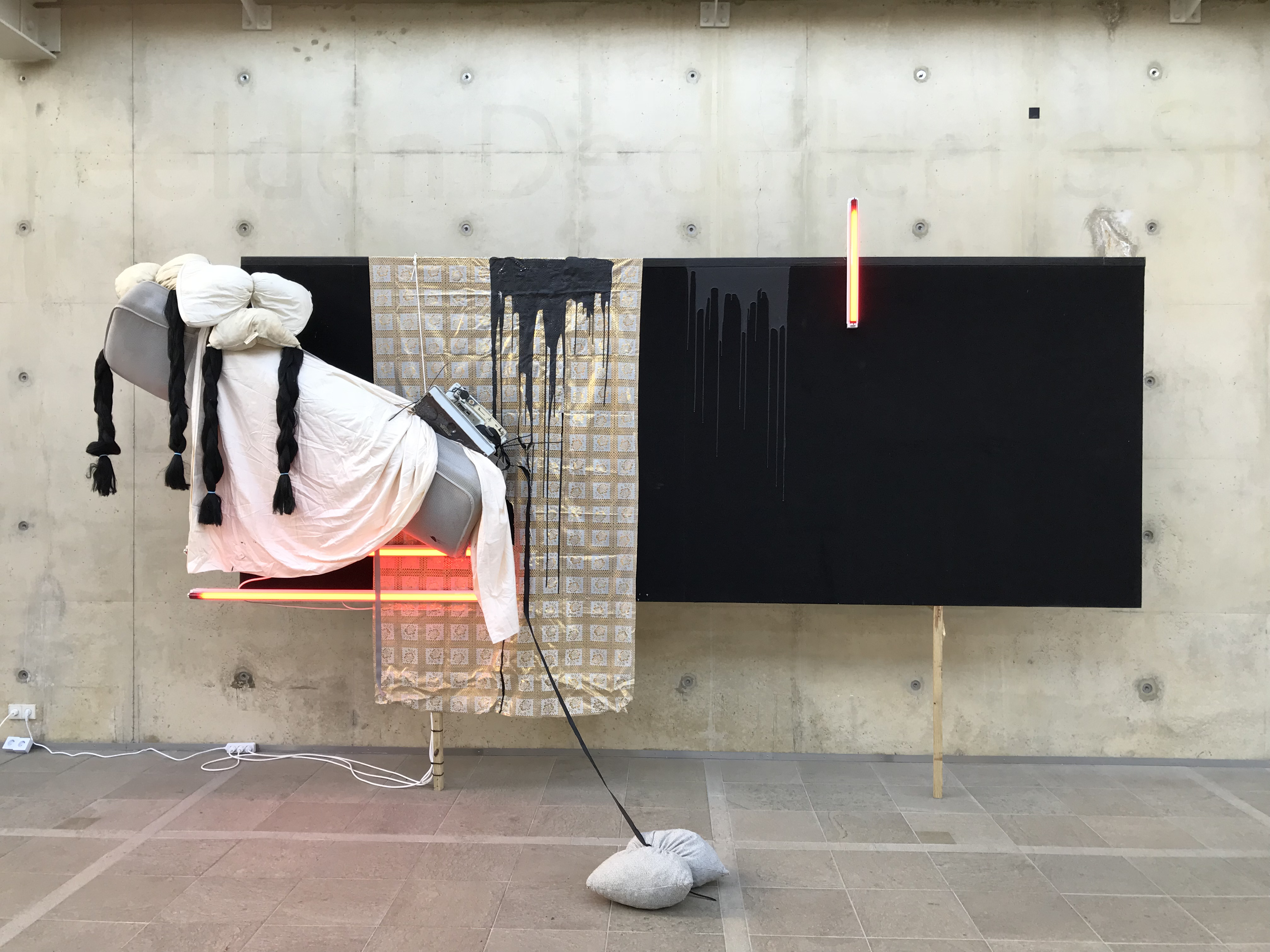
The Venus of Kawa Curaçao (2017)

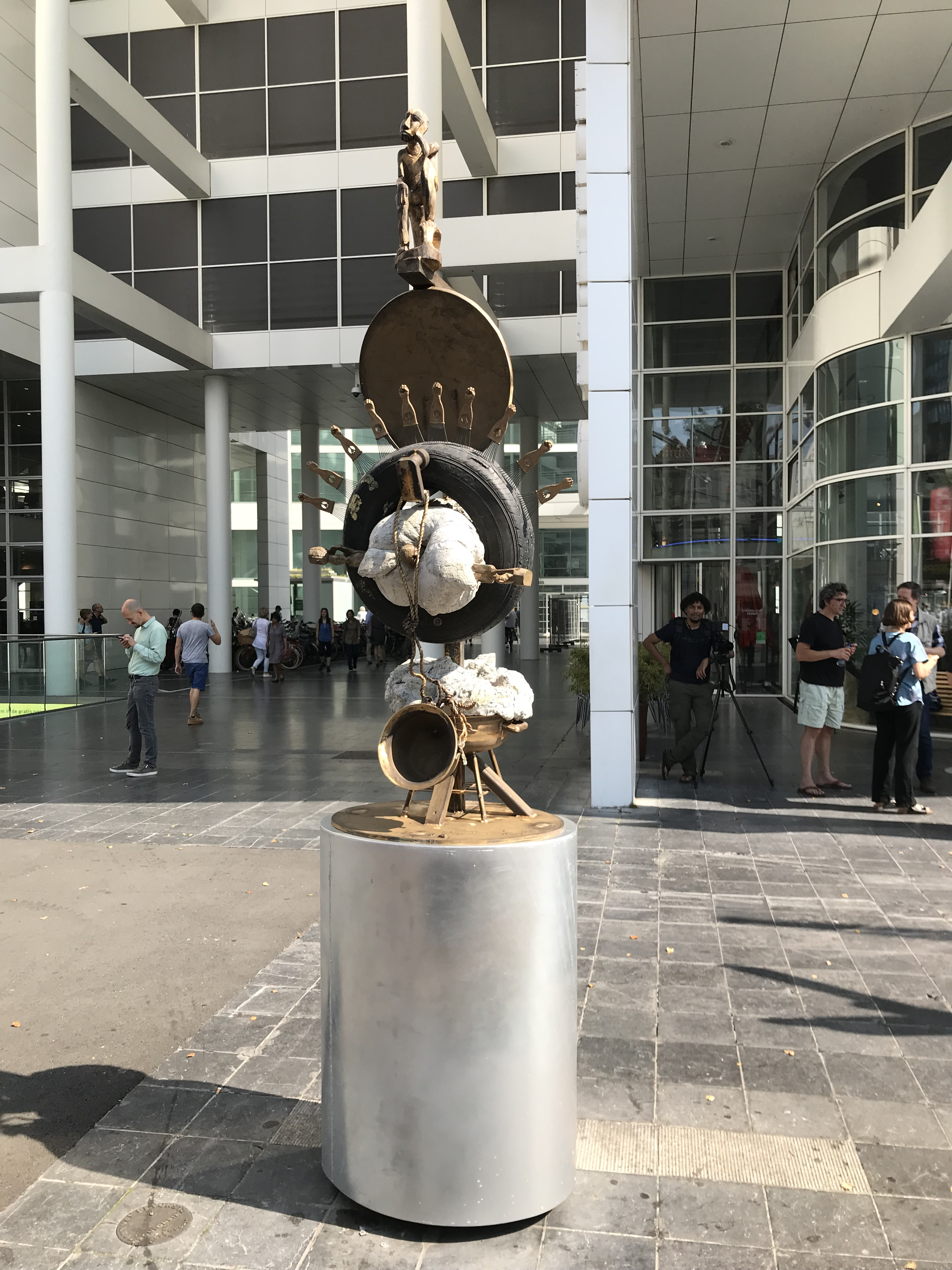
The Dematerialization of the Five Commandments in the Five Senses (2019), Spui / Grote Marktstraat / Kalvermarkt, The Hague

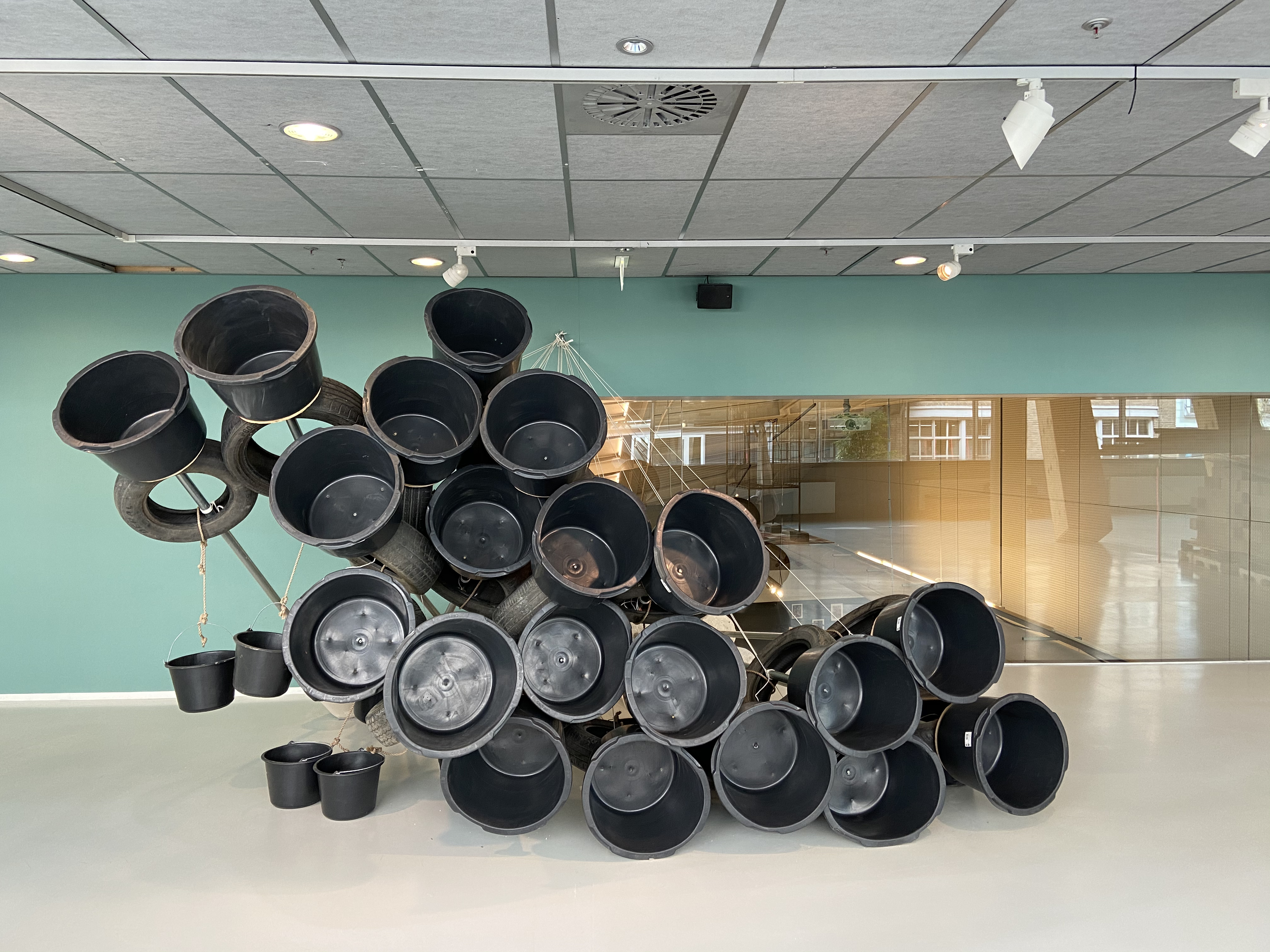
The Reasoning of the Remains (2020), Codamuseum, Apeldoorn

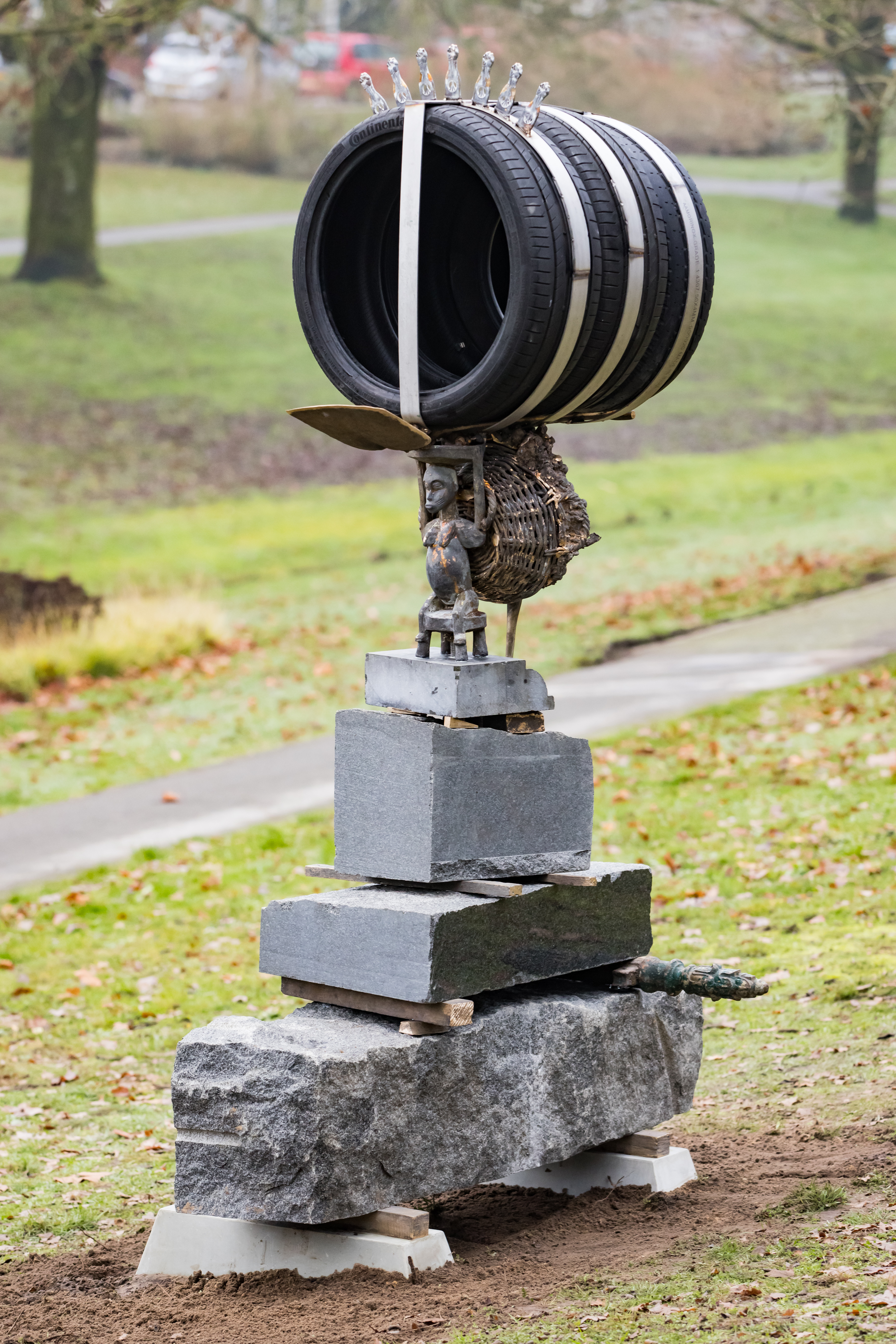
Overcoming ourselves in order to overcome (2020), Sprengenpark, Apeldoorn

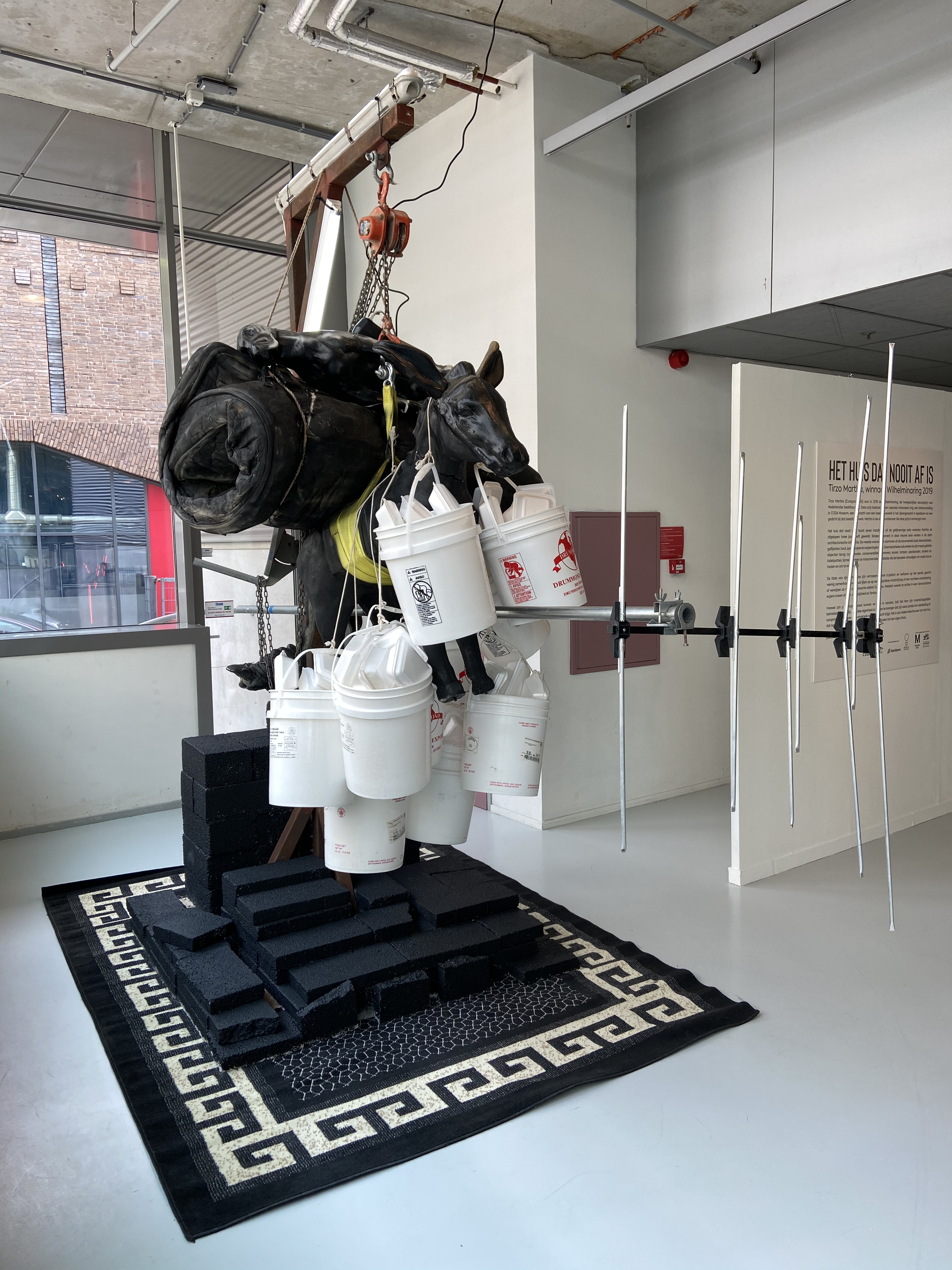
Still Life of the Curaçao Landscape with Donkey and Antenna (2020)

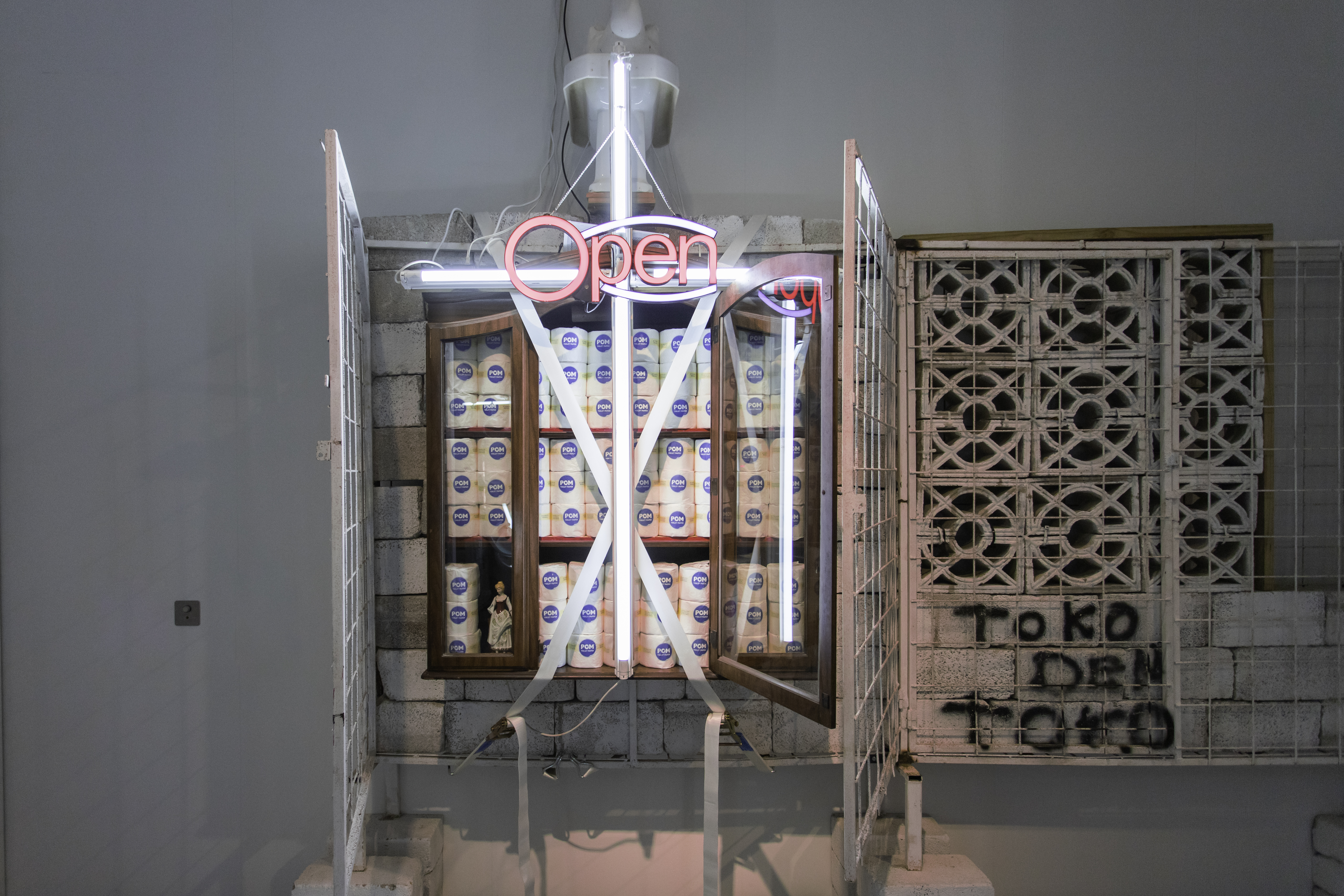
Untitled (2022)

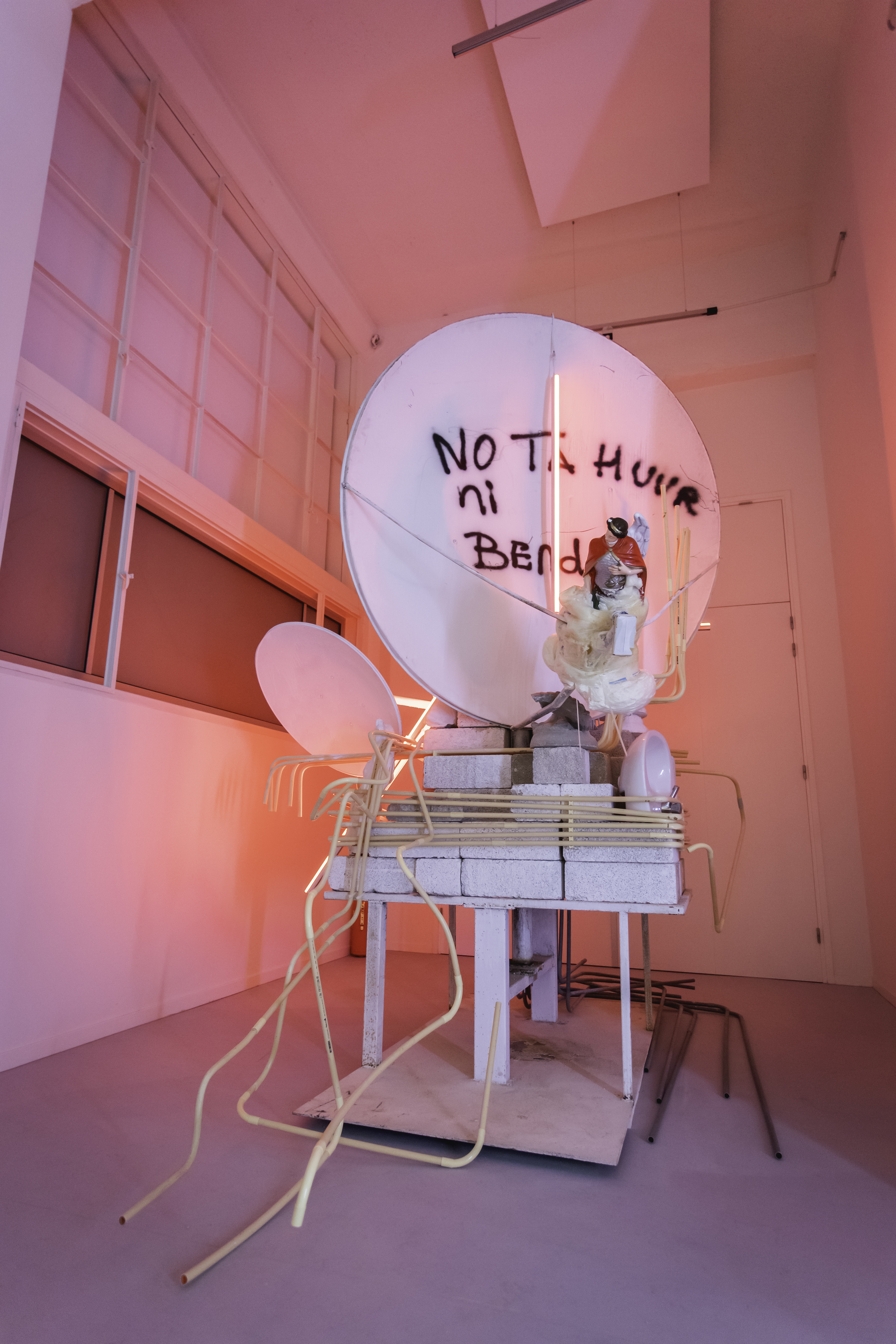
No ta huur ni bende (2022)

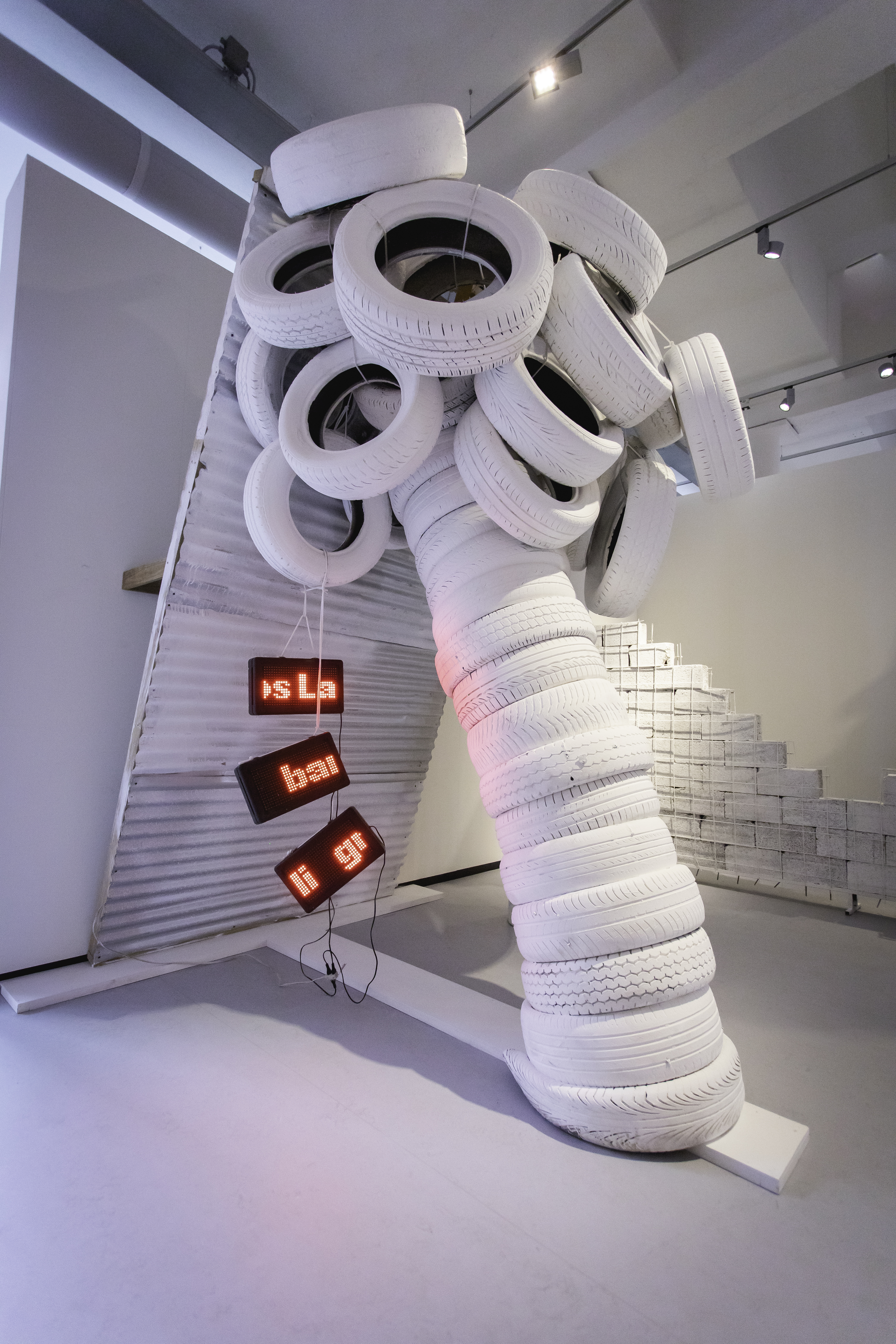
Untitled (2022)

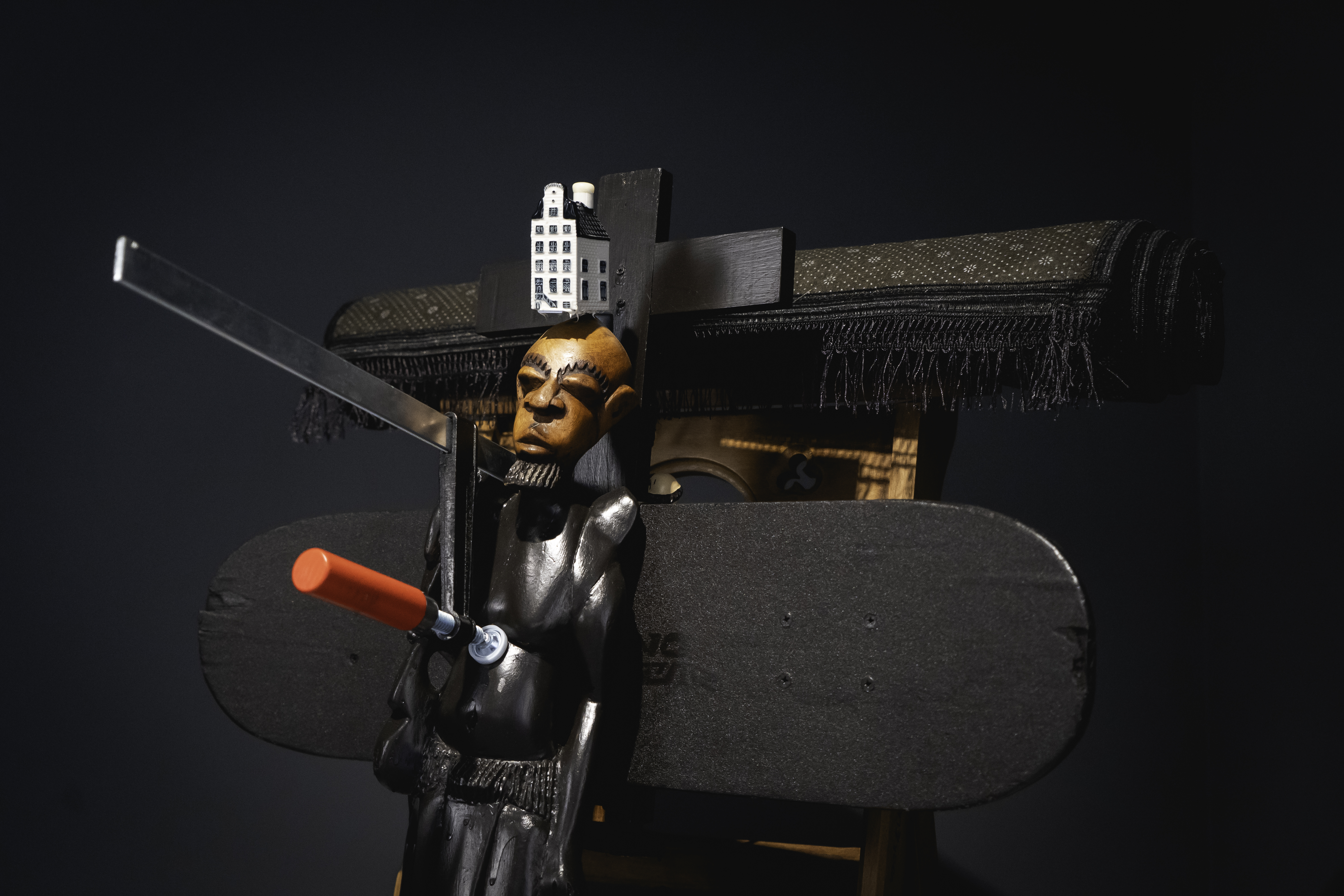
The Paradox of identifying identity and diversity no. 2 (2023)
