= Wilhelmina-ring =

Dutch lifetime achievement award

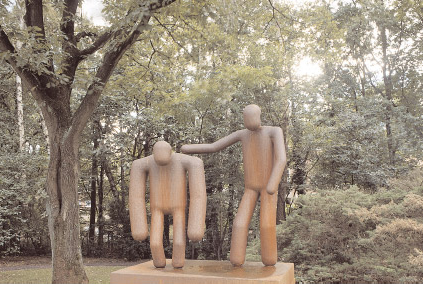
Apedoorn (2002) by Joep van Lieshout.

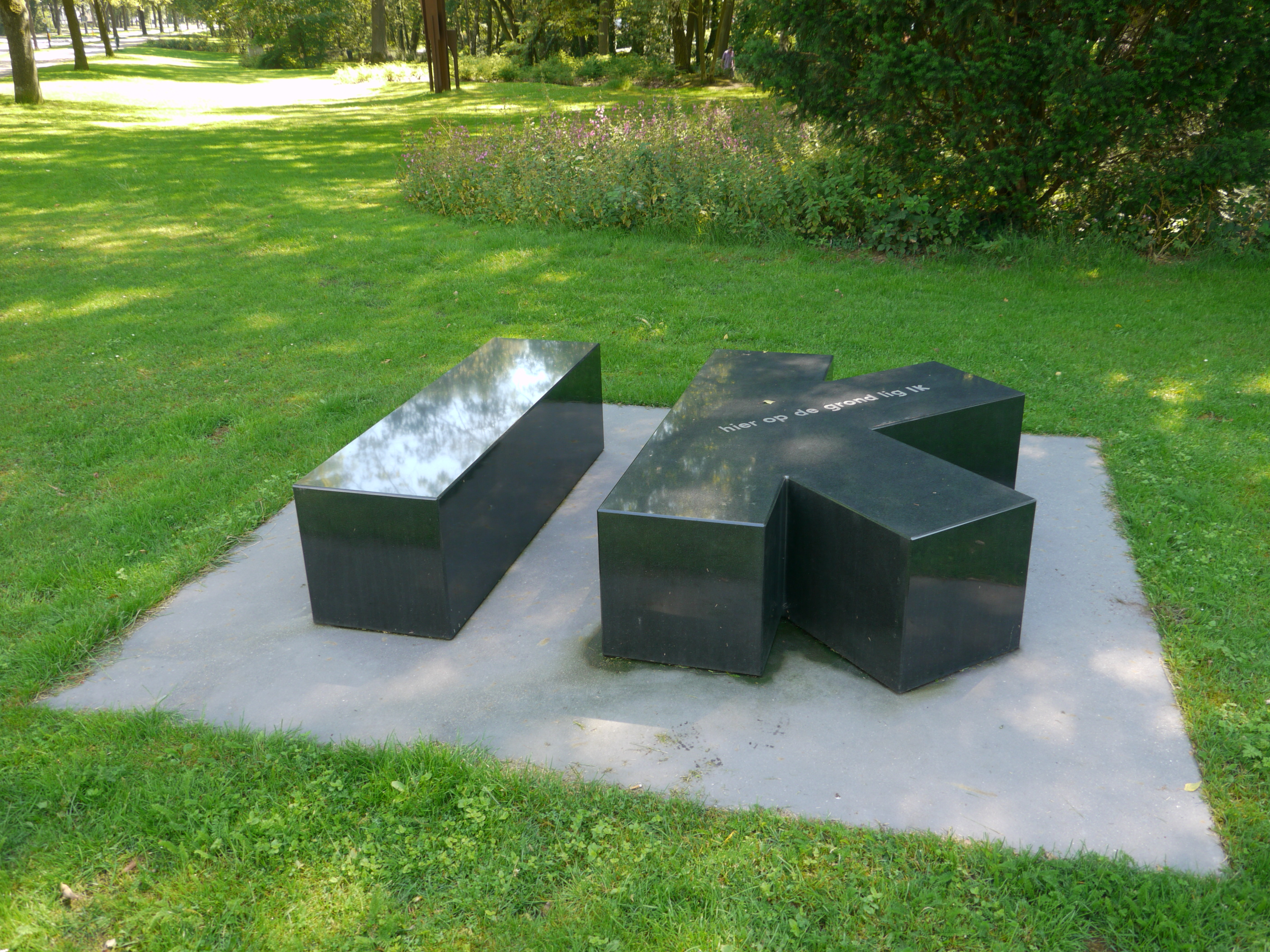
IK (2002) by Jan van Munster.

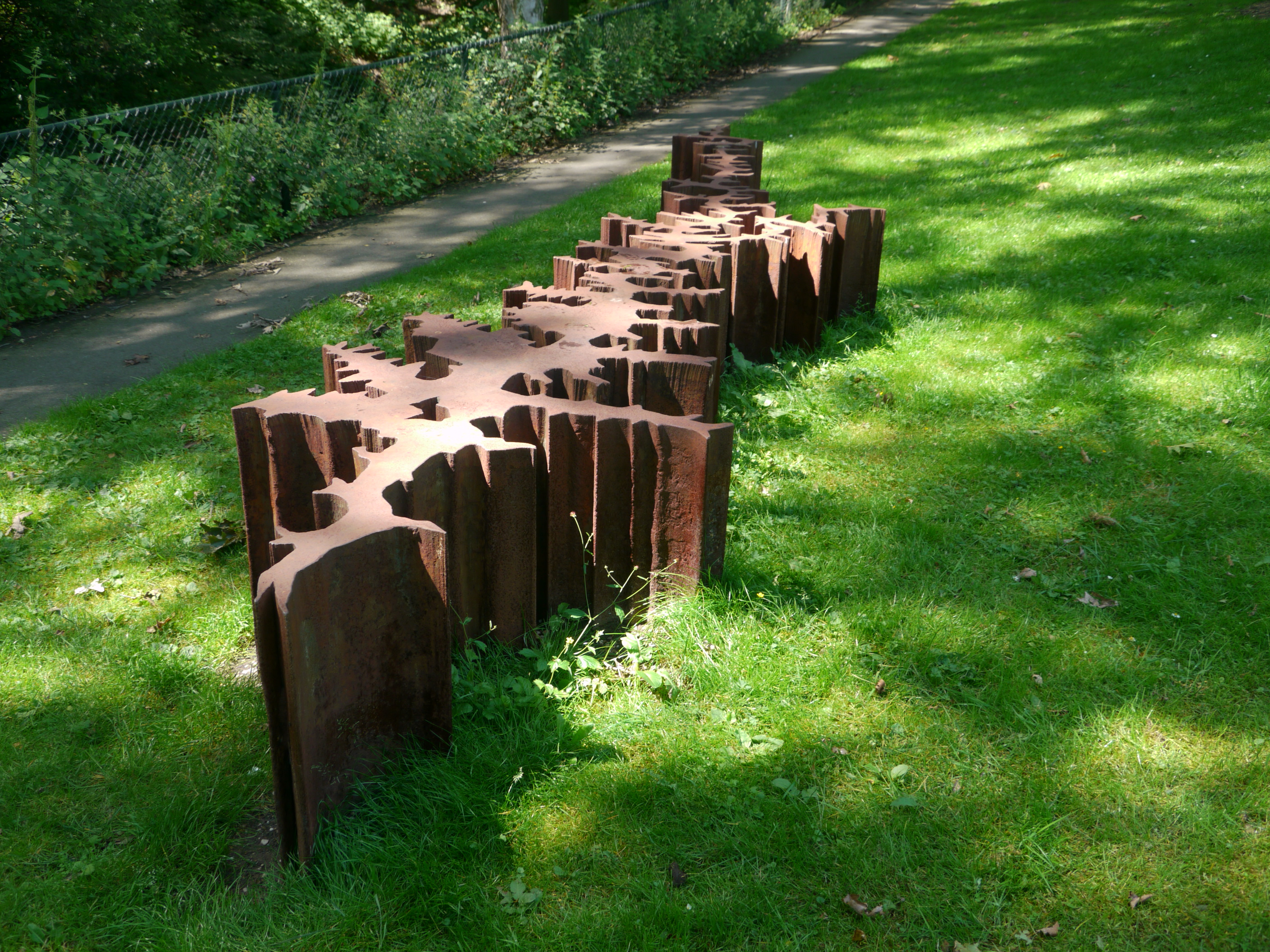
Meer (2004) by Carel Visser.

The Wilhelmina-ring is a bi-annual lifetime achievement award granted to a prominent Dutch sculptor. The prize was initiated in 1998 by the Foundation Wilhelmina-ring to memoralize that year Wilhelmina of the Netherlands was inaugurated as queen 100 years earlier.

By awarding the prize the Foundation Wilhelmina-ring want to encourage the interest in Dutch sculpture. The prize consists of a specially designed ring, an exhibition at the CODA art center in Apeldoorn, and a commission by the municipality of Apeldoorn to produce a sculpture, to be placed in the Sprengen Park.

== Prize winners ==
- 1998 : Joop Beljon; ring design: Lara Kassenaar; sculpture De versmelting (The fusion), unveiled on 7 June 2000.
- 2000 : Joep van Lieshout; ring design: Cees Post; sculpture Apedoorn, unveiled on 15 October 2001.
- 2002 : Jan van Munster; ring design: Jan Matthesius; sculpture Ik (I), unveiled on 13 November 2003.
- 2004 : Carel Visser : ring design: Ralph Bakker; sculpture Meer (Lake), unveiled on 26 April 2006.
- 2006: Maria Roosen; ring design: Cees de Vries; sculpture Boomsieraad (Tree Jewellery), unveiled on 3 December 2008.
- 2009: John Körmeling; ring design Dinie Besems; sculpture The Origin of 1 Metre, unveiled on 13 December 2013.
- 2011: Piet Slegers; ring design Beate Klockmann; sculpture Kringloop (Recycled), unveiled on 28 June 2013.
- 2013: Hans van Houwelingen; ring design Truike Verdegaal; sculpture (data missing)
- 2015: Auke de Vries; ring design Lucy Sarneel
- 2017: Eja Siepman van den Berg; ring design Katja Prins
- 2019: Tirzo Martha
- 2023: Henk Visch

In the years 2002 and 2004 also a prestigious prize was awarded.

== See also ==
- List of European art awards
