= Theo van Reijn =

Dutch sculptor

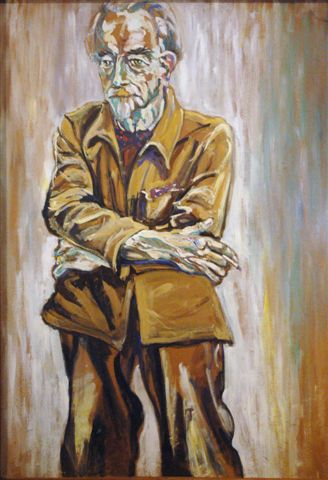
Portrait of Theo van Reijn by Cock Pijnacker Hordijk, 1949

Theo van Reijn (Breda, 28 May 1884 - Haarlem, 6 August 1954) was a Dutch sculptor.

== Life and work ==
Van Reijn attended classes in 1905 at the Rijksakademie van beeldende kunsten in Amsterdam, where Bart van Hove was one of the teachers. In 1911 he won the Dutch Prix de Rome and spent a year in Rome, and in 1914 worked in Paris. Back in The Netherlands he settled in Haarlem, where he worked until 1954. One of his pupils in Haarlem was Joop Beljon.

Van Reijn's work was included in the 1939 exhibition and sale Onze Kunst van Heden (Our Art of Today) at the Rijksmuseum in Amsterdam.

In 1948 van Reijn wrote a book about the foremost Dutch contemporary sculptures, which was published by Elsevier. In 1949 an honorary exposition of the work of Van Reijn was held in the Frans Hals Museum in Haarlem. The poster for the exhibition was designed by the Haarlem artist Coks Pijnacker Hordijk, a longtime friend of his.

The collection of Breda's Museum contains a clock by Van Reijn in the style of the Amsterdam School. Other practical objects he made include lamp bases, door knockers, fonts and bells.

== Works ==
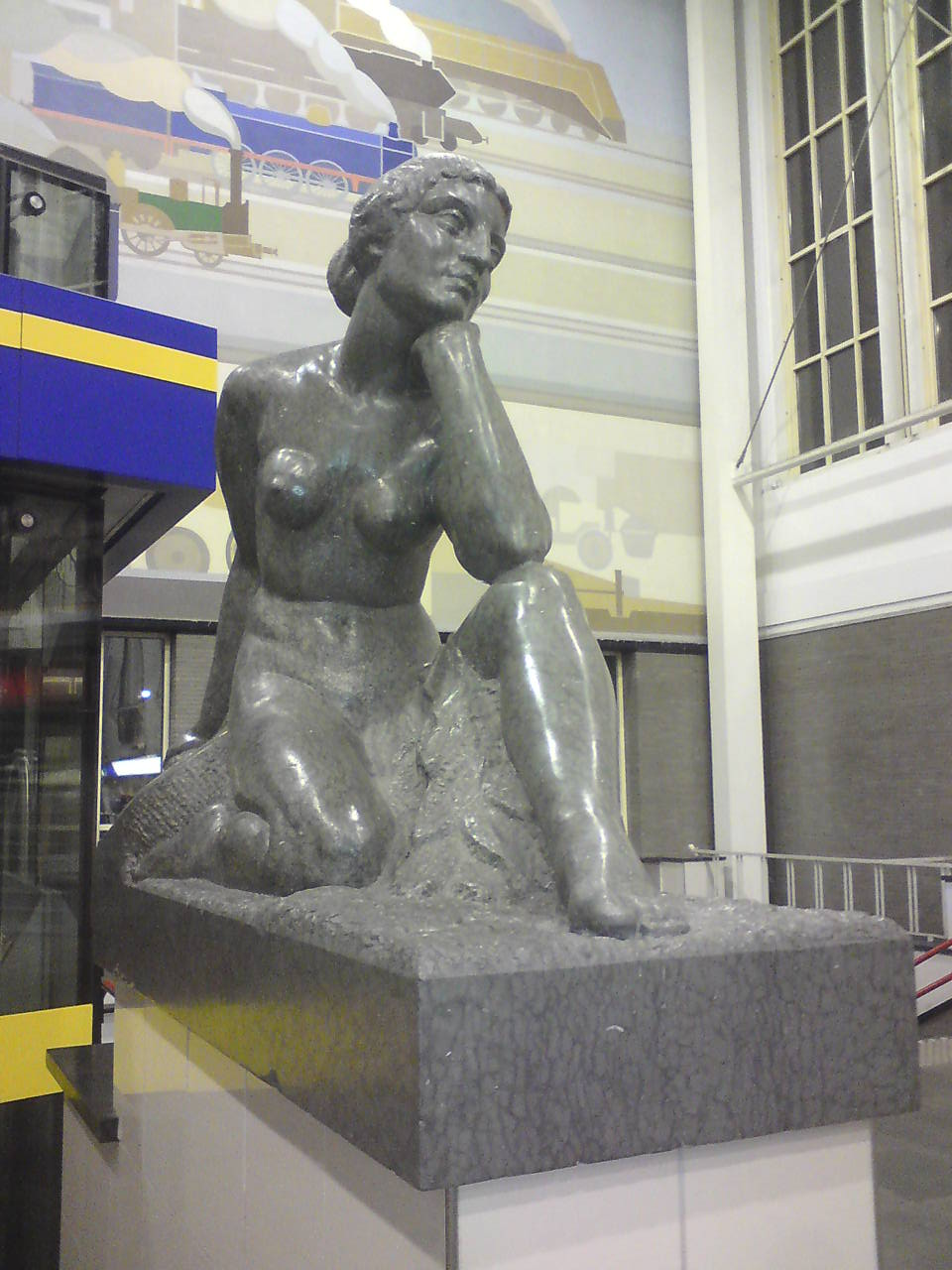
Terugblik (1939)

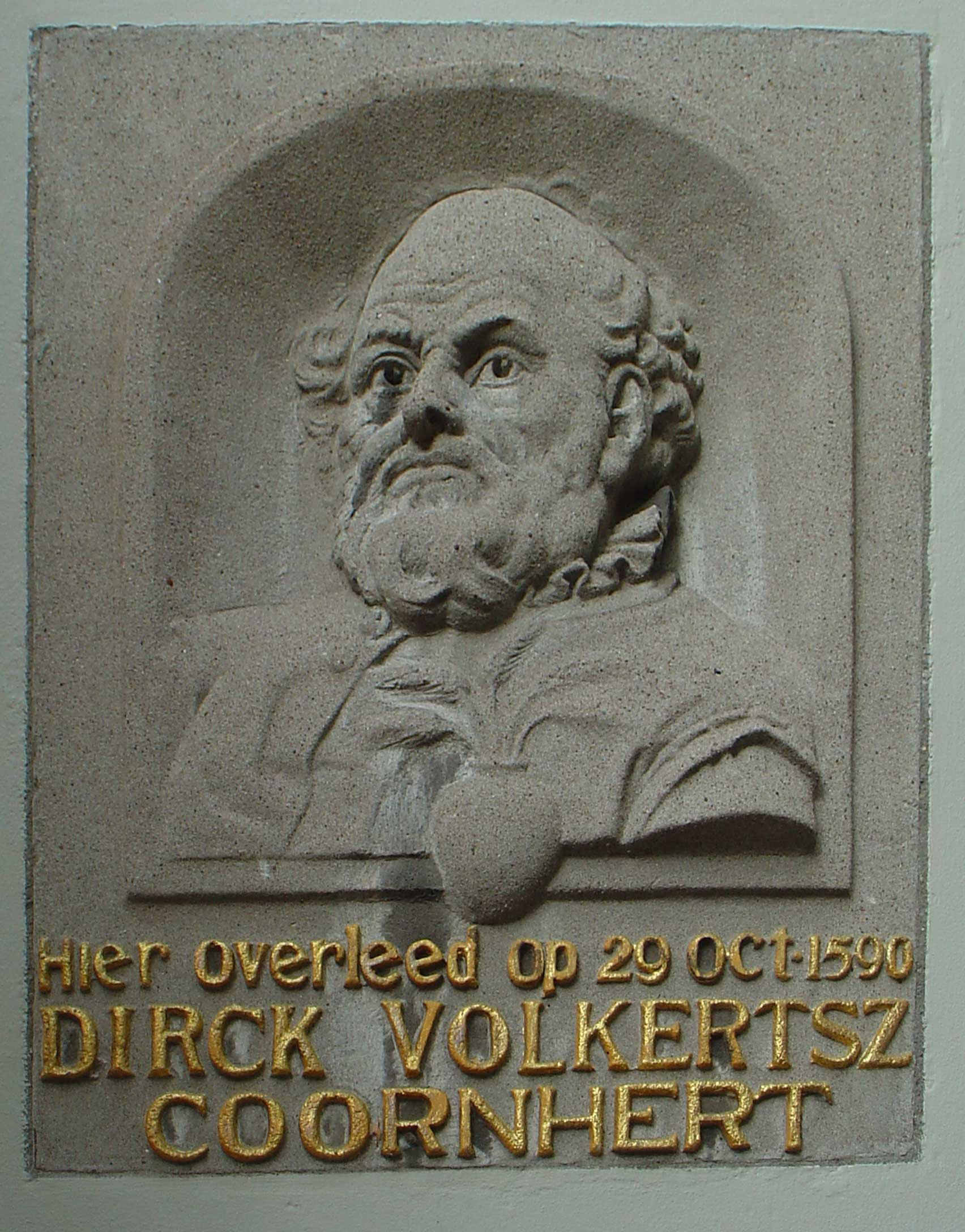
Reliëf Coornhert (1940)

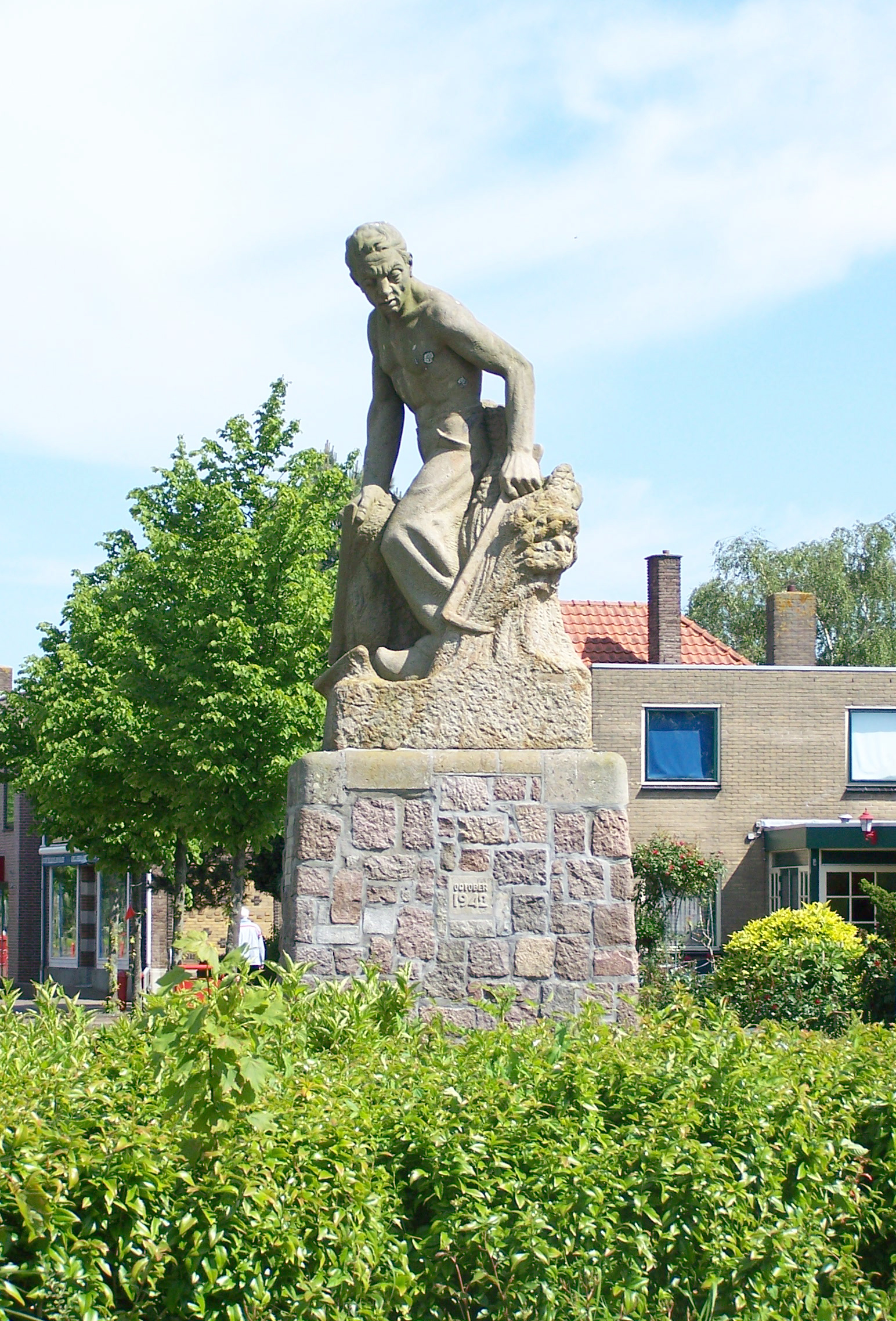
De Maaier (1941)

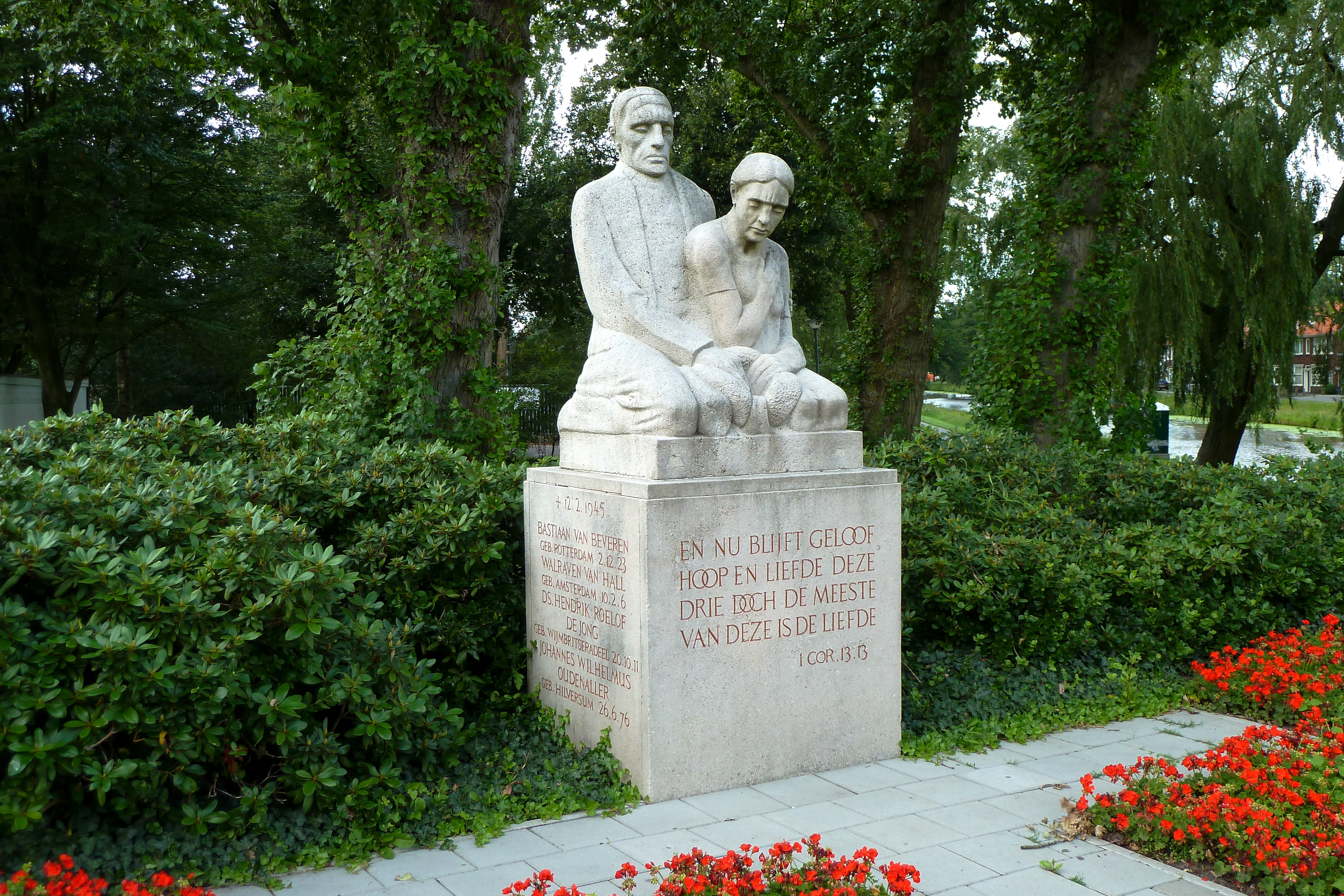
Verzetsmonument Haarlem (1950)
