= Claudio Girola =

Argentine-Chilean sculptor (1923–1994)

- Born: Claudio Mario Girola Iommi; 1923; Rosario, Argentina
- Died: October 1994 (aged 70-71); Viña del Mar, Chile
- Resting place: Quintero, Chile
- Citizenship: Argentina; Chile (1953–1994)
- Education: Manuel Belgrano National Fine Arts School; National University of the Arts
- Occupations: sculptor; painter; professor; poet
- Years active: 1946–1992
- Employer: Pontifical Catholic University of Valparaíso
- Style: concrete art; avant-garde
- Relatives: Enio Iommi (brother); Godofredo Iommi (uncle)
- Awards: Braque Prize (1963)

Claudio Mario Girola Iommi (1923, Rosario – October 1994, Viña del Mar) was an Argentine-Chilean visual artist, poet, and professor, known for his avant-garde sculptures, many of which are on display in Argentina and Chile. He is considered one of the driving forces behind the revival of Latin American visual art in the latter half of the 20th century.

He is also known for being a signatory of the Manifiesto de Cuatro Jóvenes (Manifesto of Four Young Artists) in 1942 which protested the annual National Art Exhibition of Buenos Aires (Salón Nacional de Buenos Aires) competition and its effects on art education in Argentina, as well as Argentine art education as a whole.

== Early life and education ==
Claudio Girola Iommi was born in 1923 in Rosario, Argentina, to Santiago Girola and Maria Iommi. His parents were Italian immigrants, his father from Milan and his mother from Ancona. He had two younger siblings, Enio Iommi (1926–2013), a prolific sculptor, and Nidia Girola Iommi (1929–?). His family relocated to Buenos Aires shortly after his birth. His maternal uncle, Godofredo Iommi (1917–2001), was a notable poet, architect, and educator.

Girola began studying art with his brother Enio in their father's workshop, where they learned sculpting from their father. He later studied drawing under Spanish-Argentine artist Eugenio Fornells. In 1939, he began attending the Manuel Belgrano National Fine Arts School and studied under Antonio Sibellino. He attended the National University of the Arts from 1940 to 1943, where he switched from studying drawing to studying sculpting.

== Career ==
In 1942, Girola and fellow Buenos Aires art students Jorge Brito, Tomas Maldonado, and Alfredo Hlito wrote and signed a pamphlet entitled Manifiesto de Cuatro Jóvenes which protested the annual National Art Exhibition of Buenos Aires (Salón Nacional de Buenos Aires) competition hosted at Palais de Glace and its effects on art education.

The document thrust the four young artists into a spotlight, which led to Girola, Maldonado, and Hlito forming the Concrete Art-Invention Association (Asociación Arte Concreto-Invención, AACI) in 1945 with Enio Iommi, Lidy Prati, Raúl Lozza, Manuel Espinoza, and Juan Melé. The group had its first exhibition in 1946 and disbanded in 1947. Girola's first solo exhibition was in 1947 at the Kraft Hall in Buenos Aires.

In 1949, he relocated to Europe where he would reside between Paris and Milan and studied sculpting under Georges Vantongerloo. He has his first solo exhibition in Europe that year, located at the Salto Bookstore Gallery in Milan. His work with Group MAC in Milan allowed him to gain exposure in Como.

In 1951, Girola briefly returned to Buenos Aires where he joined the Group of Modern Argentine Artists (Grupo de Artistas Modernos de la Argentina, GAMA) and participated in an exhibition of theirs at the Viau Gallery in Buenos Aires. The following year, he was invited by the Pontifical Catholic University of Valparaíso (PUCV) to exhibit at the Ministry of Education Exhibition Hall in Santiago and the Miramar Hotel in Viña del Mar. Following this exhibition, he was invited in 1953 to become a professor of visual arts at the university, which he accepted and immigrated to Chile, settling in Viña del Mar. That year, he was featured in the International Exhibition of Abstract Sculpture at the Stedelijk Museum in Amsterdam during a biennial celebration in the city. In 1956, he became a founding professor of the School of Architecture at PUCV.

In 1962, Girola exhibited at the 31st Venice Biennale. The following year, he was featured in a retrospective art exhibition at the National Museum of Fine Arts in Buenos Aires, which won him the 1963 Braque Prize awarded by the French government. Around this time, he began his works in the field of poetry when he began in 1964 as a collaborator for the French poetry review journal Revue de Poésie.

In 1965, Girola and his uncle Godofredo took part in the first Travesía de Amereida, an annual artistic expedition from Punta Arenas to Santa Cruz de la Sierra which consisted of designers, sculptors, poets, painters, and architects from Latin America and Europe. He was a contributor to the 1967 multi-authored poem about the expedition, Amereida. Following his return from this expedition, his works were featured in two high-profile exhibits at the Visual Arts Center of the Di Tella Institute: the Argentina in the World Exhibition in 1965, and the Beyond Geometry Exhibition in 1967.

In the 1970s and 80s, Girola primarily exhibited at galleries in Buenos Aires and Santiago. He also exhibited at the 11th biennale celebration at the Middelheim Open Air Sculpture Museum in Antwerp in 1971. Starting in 1973, he became a professor of graphic design and industrial design at PUCV. In 1976, he became one of the founders of Ciudad Abierta (Open City), an experimental architecture project founded by his uncle Godofredo and led by PUCV staff in the Ritoque locality of the Quintero commune which features several unique works of architecture. He designed the project's "El Pozo" space, an area designed to appeal to the senses individually. In 1988, he designed seven statues in the park of the Church of Santa Rosa de Lima in Freirina.

In 1990, Girola was featured in the international Art in Latin America exhibit that exhibited in London, Stockholm, and Madrid. The next year, PUCV hosted an exhibition called Claudio Girola Sculpture and Journey 1940-1991 in the Providencia Sculpture Park of Santiago which was a retrospective of his works over the years. After a series of four exhibitions in Chile and Spain in 1992, he retired from sculpting until his death in 1994.

As of 2025, Girola's sculptures and paintings can be found on display in collections throughout Argentina and Chile. In Buenos Aires, his works can be found in the collections of the Museum of Latin American Art, the National Museum of Fine Arts, and the Aldo de Souza Art Gallery. In Chile, his works can be found in the collections of PUCV's Exhibition Hall at its Valparaíso campus, the Amereida Cultural Corporation in Viña del Mar, and the Policentro Building and Museum of Contemporary Art in Santiago. He also has sculptures in the collection of the Faculty of Architecture at the National University of Córdoba. There are sculptures of his on display in Santiago's Providencia Sculpture Park, and a sculpture in Valparaíso's La Matriz Square dedicated to Dionisio Faúndez, a young man who gained minor popularity in Valparaíso around 1966 for his profession as a wanderer.

== Style ==
Girola primarily created abstract works of sculpture and painting within the concrete art style. He originally started creating sculptures in the traditional Argentine figurative style before transitioning to an abstract planar style with oblique, horizontal, or curved forms that broke traditional mass into spatial planes. Instead of traditional solid mass, his sculptures became constructs of planes (vertical, horizontal, or oblique) interacting in space to suggest movement and tension.

A defining characteristic of his mature style is the integration, or elimination, of the pedestal, turning the support into an active component of the artwork itself. This challenged viewers’ expectations and created a spatial ambiguity, as the artwork no longer sat on something but often appeared suspended or dispersed. His later works often employed fragmentation, cut planes, and voids.

He acknowledged his intention to “build a void” and to put dispersion in operation in his later works. This was part of a larger artistic and philosophical inquiry he pursued while working on the Ciudad Abierta. There, his works engaged not only with sculptural tradition but also with landscape, poetry, and architecture, blurring disciplines.

Girola’s drawings and collages are crucial in understanding his thought process: they are not only studies but parallel fields of invention. His two-dimensional works often contain layered planes, rhythmic structures, and material experiments echoing his sculptural explorations.

== Personal life ==
Girola married in 1982 to a Chilean woman named Maria Eliana del Corazón de Jesús Lira Calvo in Viña del Mar. Claudio Girola Iommi died in Viña del Mar in October 1994. He was buried at Cementerio de la Ciudad Abierta at the Ciudad Abierta in Ritoque.

== Works ==
=== Notable solo exhibitions ===
- 1947: New Art Exhibition, Kraft Hall, Buenos Aires
- 1948: Concrete Art Exhibition, Müller Gallery, Buenos Aires
- 1949: Salto Bookstore Gallery, Milan
- 1949: Concrete Art Exhibition 1949-1950, Como
- 1952: Argentine Concrete Artists, Exhibition Hall, Ministry of Education, Santiago
- 1952: Concrete Art, Miramar Hotel, Viña del Mar
- 1953: Argentine Sculpture, Krayd Gallery, Buenos Aires
- 1953: Concrete Art, Museum of Modern Art, Rio de Janeiro
- 1953: Ten Great Masters, Paseo Defensa, San Telmo
- 1961: Claudio Girola, Sculptures, Retrospective 1945-1960, National Museum of Fine Arts, Santiago
- 1962: XXXI Venice Biennale, Venice
- 1963: From Concrete Art to the New Argentine Tendency 1944-1963, Museum of Modern Art, Buenos Aires
- 1964: Pascal Gallery, Paris
- 1965: Eight Sculptors, La Ruche Gallery, Buenos Aires
- 1965: Argentina in the World, Visual Arts Center of the Di Tella Institute, Buenos Aires
- 1967: Beyond Geometry, Visual Arts Center of the Di Tella Institute, Buenos Aires
- 1968: International Exhibition of Abstract Sculpture, Amsterdam Biennial, Stedelijk Museum, Amsterdam
- 1968: Drawings by Claudio Girola, Exhibition Hall of the School of Architecture of the Pontifical Catholic University of Valparaíso, Valparaíso
- 1970: Abstract Sculpture, Hebrew Society of Argentina, Buenos Aires
- 1970: Claudio Girola, Sculptures, Rubbers Gallery, Buenos Aires
- 1971: Claudio Girola, Sculptures, Central Art Gallery, Santiago
- 1971: XI Biënale Middelheim Antwerpen, Antwerp
- 1971: Fifty Years of Argentine Sculpture, National Museum of Fine Arts, Buenos Aires
- 1971: The Family, Carmen Waugh Gallery, Santiago
- 1974: Claudio Girola, Sculptures, Temperas and Inks, Carmen Waugh Gallery, Buenos Aires
- 1976: Avant-garde of the 1940s, Eduardo Sivori Museum of Plastic Arts, Buenos Aires
- 1977: Eleven Spaces, Ruth Bencazar Gallery, Buenos Aires
- 1978: Braque Prize Retrospective 1963-1969, Eduardo Sivori Museum of Plastic Arts, Buenos Aires
- 1985: Eleven Artists from Valparaíso, National Museum of Fine Arts, Santiago
- 1985: Contemporary Chilean Sculpture, Art Gallery of the University of Concepción, Concepción
- 1985: Abstraction in the 20th Century, Museum of Modern Art, Buenos Aires
- 1987: Argentine Sculpture, the Last 15 Years, Center for Modern Art, Buenos Aires
- 1987: Dispersa II, Carmen Waugh Gallery, Santiago
- 1990: Art in Latin America, London, Stockholm, Madrid
- 1991: Claudio Girola Sculpture and Journey 1940-1991, Providencia Sculpture Park, Santiago
- 1992: Chilean Pavilion at the Universal Exposition, Seville
- 1992: Sculptural Presence, Providencia Sculpture Park, Santiago
- 1992: Thirty Years of Sculpture, Praxis Gallery, Santiago
- 1992: Academic Artists of the Universities of Valparaíso, El Farol Hall, Valparaíso

=== Group exhibitions ===
- 1946: Concrete Art-Invention Association Exhibition, Peuser Hall, Buenos Aires (with AACI)
- 1947: Concrete Art-Invention Association Exhibition, Van Riel Gallery, Buenos Aires (with AACI)
- 1952: Modern Artists of Argentina, Viau Gallery, Buenos Aires (with GAMA)
- 1953: Group of Modern Artists, Krayd Gallery, Buenos Aires (with GAMA)
- 1953: Museum of Modern Art, Rio de Janeiro (with GAMA)
- 1955: Viau Gallery, Buenos Aires (with GAMA)
- 1963: Carlos Pacheco and Claudio Girola, Nice Gallery, Buenos Aires (with Carlos Pacheco)
- 1963: Sculptures by Claudio Girola and Ennio Iommi, National Museum of Fine Arts, Buenos Aires (with Enio Iommi)
- 1981: Francisco Méndez-Claudio Girola, Sala de Arte Viña del Mar, Viña del Mar (with Francisco Méndez Labbé)

=== Posthumous exhibitions ===
- 1995: 50 Years of the Concrete Art-Invention Association, Cultural Center of Buenos Aires, Buenos Aires
- 1999: A Creative Horizon by Claudio Girola, El Farol Hall, Valparaíso
- 2001: Claudio Girola, Sculptor, National Museum of Fine Arts, Santiago
- 2007: Art and Natural Resources: Mining, Museum of Contemporary Art, University of Chile, Santiago
- 2007: Claudio Girola: Invention and Journey 1923-1994, Telefónica Foundation, Santiago
