= Juan Melé =

Argentine sculptor, painter and art critic (1923–2012

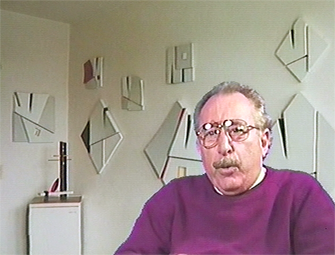
- Born: Juan Nicolás Melé; October 15, 1923; Buenos Aires, Argentina
- Died: March 29, 2012 (aged 88); Buenos Aires, Argentina
- Occupations: Painter sculptor art critic
- Known for: Concrete Art

Juan Nicolás Melé (born October 15, 1923 – March 29, 2012) was an Argentine sculptor, painter, and art critic. Melé was a member of the Asociación Arte Concreto-Invención as well as co-founder of the Grupo Arte Nuevo.

== Early life and education ==
Melé was born in Buenos Aires, Argentina. Melé credits his father, who drew and painted, with introducing him to the arts.

In 1935, at 11 years old Melé began to study drawing and painting under the guidance of artist Enrique Rodríguez. In 1938, Melé attended the Escuela de Bellas Artes Manuel Belgrano where he studied until 1945. During his time at the Escuela de Bellas Artes Manuel Belgrano he befriended fellow artists Gregorio Vardánega and Tomás Maldonado. In 1945, upon graduating from the Escuela de Bellas Artes Manuel Belgrano Melé began teaching art at the Escuela Nacional de Bellas Artes Prilidiano Pueyrredón in Buenos Aires. In 1948 Melé was awarded a scholarship by the French government to study at the École du Louvre. During his studies in Paris Melé studied at Sonia Delaunay and Georges Vantongerloo's studio.

== Career ==
In 1946, Melé joined the Asociación Arte Concreto-Invención, a concrete art group formed in 1945 by Tomás Maldonado, Lidy Prati, Alfredo Hlito, Raúl Lozza, among others. Melé participated in the group's third exhibition organized in October 1946 at the Argentinian Society of Plastic Arts.

In September 1948, along with fellow artists Carmelo Arden Quin and Gregorio Vardánega, Melé traveled to Europe eventually settling in Paris. Once in Paris Melé received a scholarship from the French Government to study at the École du Louvre. That same year in Paris Melé exhibited works at the Salon des Réalités Nouvelles and at the Maison de l'Amerique Latine. The following year Melé traveled to Italy where he met several concrete artists and exhibited work at the librería Salto in Milan. That same year while traveling in Switzerland Melé met Swiss artist and leading theorist of concrete art Max Bill.

Melé returned to Buenos Aires in 1950 and began to write as an art critic for several publications. Upon his return to Argentina, Melé also took a position as an art history professor at his alma mater, the Escuela Nacional de Bellas Artes where he remained until 1961. In 1953 Melé participated in the II Bienal de São Pablo as well as the XII Salón de Arte Mar del Plata and the Salón Anual de la Provincia de Corrientes (Argentina)where he was awarded third prize. In 1955 Melé, along with Carmelo Arden Quin, Gregorio Vardáneg and others, co-founded the Asociación Arte Nuevo.

In 1961, Melé traveled to the United States where he stayed until his return to Buenos Aires in 1971. Melé returned to the United States in 1974 and settled in New York City where he held several exhibitions. Melé returned to Buenos Aires in 1986.

Beginning in 1990, Melé lived between Buenos Aires and Paris. Melé was awarded the Alberto J. Trabucco award by the Academia Nacional de Bellas Artes in 1997.

== Selected exhibitions ==
Solo exhibitions

- 1976: Clovelly Lane Gallery (New York)
- 1978: Cayman Gallery (New York)
- 1979: Clovelly Lane Gallery (New York)
- 1982: Museo de Artes Plásticas Eduardo Sívori (Buenos Aires)
- 1983: Arch Gallery (New York)
- 1985: Arch Gallery (New York)
- 1987: Museo de Arte Moderno (Buenos Aires)
- 1995: Una investigación constructivo en los '90, Centro Cultural Borges (Buenos Aires)
- 1983: Galerie Slotine (Paris)
- 1983: Juan Melé, hoy. 60 años después, Salas Nacionales de Exposición, Palais de Glace (Buenos Aires)
- 2006: Galería Van Eyck (Buenos Aires)
- 2009: Museo de Arte Contemporáneo Latinoamericano La Plata (Buenos Aires)

Group exhibitions

- 1953: São Paulo Art Biennial / II Bienal Internacional de Arte de São Paulo (São Paulo, Brazil)
- 1989–90: Art in Latin America. The Modern Era, 1820– 1980, The Hayward Gallery (London); Nationalmuseum / Moderna Museet (Stockholm); Palacio de Velázquez (Madrid)
- 1990: Argentina. Arte Concreto Invención 1945, Grupo Madí 1946, Rachel Adler Gallery (New York)
- 1991: Arte Concreto Invención, Grupo Madí, Naus für konstruktive und konkrete Kunst (Zurich)
- 1992–93: Artistas latinoamericanos del sigle XX, Estación Plaza de Armas (Seville); Musée national d'art moderne, Centre national d'art et de culture Georges Pompidou (Paris); Josef-Haubrich-Kunsthalle (Cologne); The Museum of Modern Art (New York)
- 1994–95: Art from Argentina 1920– 1994, Museum of Modern Art (Oxford)[Traveling exhibition]
- 1997: I Bienal de Artes Visuais do Mercosur (Porto Alegre)
- 2001: Abstract Art from Rio de la Plata, Buenos Aires and Montevideo, 1933– 1953, The Americas Society (New York)
- 2002: Madí, L'art sud-américain, Musée de Grenoble (Grenoble)
- 2003–04: Arte abstracto argentino, Galleria d'arte moderna e contemporanea (Bergamo); Fundación Proa (Buenos Aires)
- 2006: The Sites of Latin American Abstraction. Cisneros Fontanals Art Foundation (Miami, Florida) [Traveling exhibition]
- 2007: Geometry of Hope. Latin American Abstract Art from the Patricia Phelps de Cisneros Collection. Blanton Museum of Art, The University of Texas Austin (Austin, Texas); Grey Art Gallery, New York University (New York)
- 2009: Expansionismo. Contemporary Latin American Artists Explore Space, The Museum of Geometric and MADI Art (Dallas, Texas)
- 2010: Géométrie hors limites. Art contemporain Latino-américain dans la collection Jean et Colette Cherqui, Maison de l'Amérique (Paris)
- 2010: Constructive spirit. Abstract art in South and North America, 1920's-50s, Newark Museum (Newark);Amon Carter Museum (Fort Worth, Texas)
- 2010: Vibración. Moderne Kunst aus Lateinamerika. The Ella Fontanals-Cisneros Collection Bundeskunsthalle (Bonn, Germany)

== Selected works ==
- Irregular Frame no. 2 at the Museum of Modern Art (1946)
- Homenaje a Mondrian at Museo de Arte Contemporaneo de Buenos Aires (1946)
- Pintura n° 42 at Museo de Arte Contemporaneo de Buenos Aires (1955)
- Planos y direcciones at Museo de Arte Contemporaneo de Buenos Aires (1955)
