= Rhod Rothfuss =

Uruguayan-Argentine artist (1920–1969)

- Born: Carlos María Rothfuss; 1920; Montevideo, Uruguay
- Died: December 31, 1969 (aged 49); Montevideo, Uruguay
- Other names: Carlos María Rothfuß; Carlos María Rothfuss
- Occupations: Painter; Sculptor
- Years active: 1938-1969

Carlos María "Rhod" Rothfuss (1920 – December 31, 1969) was a Uruguayan-Argentine artist who specialized in painting and sculpture. He was considered a key theoretician for the development of the concrete art movement in Argentina in the 1940s and was a founding member of the international Latin American abstract art movement, Grupo Madí.

== Early life and education ==
Rothfuss was born in Montevideo, Uruguay.

In 1938, Rothfuss studied art at Círculo de Bellas Artes in Montevideo. He studied with the artists Guillermo Laborde and José Cúneo. In the early 1940s, he studied at the Academia de Bellas Artes in Montevideo.

== Career ==
In 1939 while at an Emilio Pettoruti art show, Rothfuss met and became friends with the artist, Carmelo Arden Quin.

In 1942, Rothfuss moved from Uruguay to Buenos Aires, Argentina, where he lived until 1945.

Rothfuss soon became friends with fellow artists, Gyula Kosice, Tomás Maldonado, Carmelo Arden Quin.

In 1944, Rothfuss was part of the group of artists who created and edited the magazine called Arturo, which existed for only one issue, and included fellow artists, Carmelo Arden Quin, Edgar Bailey, Gyula Kosice, Raúl Lozza, Tomas Maldonado, and Lidy Prati. Rothfuss contributed an article called: "El marco. un problema de la plástica actual (The frame: A Problem of Plastic Arts Today)," which became an important text on the theory and movement of art towards geometry. Rothfuss was stating what was then a revolutionary idea, that he was advocating for the removal of the frame of the painting, saying that it got in the way of the art.

In 1945, Rothfuss participated in two seminal concrete art exhibitions called Arte Concreto-Invención in Buenos Aires.

In 1945, Rothfuss participated in Asociación Arte Concreto-Invención's first two concrete art exhibitions organized at the homes of Swiss born psychoanalyst, Enrique Pichon-Rivière, and German-Argentinian photographer, Grete Stern. Rothfuss also participated in the group's third exhibition organized in October 1946 at the Argentinian Society of Plastic Arts.

During this time, to illustrate the concrete nature of his work, Rothfuss used nontraditional materials like diamonds and employed notched and irregular shapes in his artwork.

From 1945 to 1950, Rothfuss created sculptures that had moving parts.

In 1946, Rothfuss joined the Asociación Arte Concreto-Invención, a concrete art group founded by Tomás Maldonado in 1944. Other artists in the group included Alfredo Hlito, Lidy Prati, Manuel Espinosa, Enio Iommi, Raul Lozza among others.

In 1946, Gyula Kosice, Carmelo Arden Quin, and Rothfuss founded the Grupo Madí.

== Selected exhibitions ==
Group exhibitions

- 1945: "Arte Concreto-Invención." Buenos Aires – two exhibitions
- 1976: "Homenaje a la vanguardia argentina: Dècada del 40." Galeria Arte Nuevo (Buenos Aires)
- 1980: "Vanguardias de la década del 40. Arte Concreto-Invención, Arte Madí, Perceptismo." Museo de Artes Plásticas Eduardo Sívori (Buenos Aires)
- 1992–93: "Artistas latinoamericanos del siglo XX." Estación Plaza de Armas (Seville); Musée national d’art moderne, Centre national d’art et de culture Georges Pompidou (Paris); Josef-Haubrich-Kunsthalle, Cologne; The Museum of Modern Art (New York)
- 1994–95: "Art from Argentina 1920–1994." Museum of Modern Art (Oxford) [traveling exhibition]
- 1997–98: "Arte Madí." Museo Nacional Centro de Arte Reina Sofía (Madrid); Museo Extremeño e Iberoamericano de Arte Contemporáneo (Badajoz) – Exhibition held at the Museo Nacional Centro de Arte Reina Sofia, July 1-October 27, 1997, and at the Museo Extremeño Iberoamericano de Arte Contemporaneo, November 7, 1997 – January 11, 1998
- 2000: "Heterotopías. Medio siglo sin lugar. 1918–1968." Museo Nacional Centro de Arte Reina Sofía (Madrid)
- 2001: "Abstract Art from Río de la Plata. Buenos Aires and Montevideo, 1933–1953." The Americas Society (New York)
- 2002: "Madí. L’art sud-américain." Musée de Grenoble (Grenoble)
- 2003–4: "Arte abstracto argentino, Galleria d’arte moderna e contemporanea." Bergamo; Fundación Proa (Buenos Aires)
- 2004: "Inverted Utopias. Avant-Garde Art in Latin America." Museum of Fine Arts, (Houston Texas)
- 2007: "The Geometry of Hope. Latin American Abstract Art from the Patricia Phelps de Cisneros Collection." Blanton Museum of Art, The University of Texas at Austin (Austin, Texas); Grey Art Gallery, New York University (New York)

== Selected works ==
- Composición Madí at Museum of Fine Arts, Houston (1946)
- Pintura Madí o persistencia de un contorno Madí at Fundación Proa (1946)
- Composición Madí at Museum of Fine Arts, Houston (1948)
- Yellow Oblong at the Museum of Modern Art (1955)

== Works and publications ==
- Rothfuss, Rhod (1944). "El marco. un problema de la plástica actual / The Frame: A Problem in Contemporary Art". Arturo (in Spanish and English). 1 (1).
- Arenas, Braulio; Rothfuss, Rhod (1944). Arenas, Braulio (ed.). El caballero invisible (in Spanish). Buenos Aires: Ediciones Ubu. OCLC 50043931.
- Rothfuss, Rhod (October 1948). Kosice, Gyula (ed.). "Un aspecto de la superposición". Arte Madí Universal (in Spanish and German) (2). Buenos Aires.
- Rothfuss, Rhod (June 1954). Kosice, Gyula (ed.). "Decoración y pintura". Arte Madí Universal (in Spanish) (7–8). Buenos Aires: 4–6.
- Rothfuss, Rhod (October 1948). Kosice, Gyula (ed.). "Super Estructuras". Arte Madí Universal (2). Buenos Aires: 2.
- Borràs, Maria Lluïsa (1997). "Rhod Rhothfuss: Un fantasma recorre Madí by Sagradini, Mario". Arte Madí: Exposición organizada por el Museo Nacional Centro de Arte Reina Sofía (in Spanish and English). Madrid: Ministerio de Educacion y Cultura. ISBN 978-8-480-26089-3. OCLC 698573072. – Catalog of an exhibition held at the Museo Nacional Centro de Arte Reina Sofia, July 1-October 27, 1997, and at the Museo Extreme~no e Iberoamericano de Arte Contemporaneo, November 7, 1997 – January 11, 1998
- Suárez, Osbel (exhibition concept and guest curator); García, María Amalia; Agnew, Michael (translations) (2011). Witschey, Erica; Fundación Juan March (eds.). Cold America: Geometric Abstraction in Latin América (1934–1973) (Exhibition catalog). Madrid: Fundación Juan March. ISBN 978-84-7075-588-0. OCLC 707460289. Wikidata () – Exhibition catalog of Cold America, Geometric Abstraction in Latin America (1934–1973), Fundación Juan March, Madrid, February 11-May 15, 2011
- Suárez, Osbel (exhibition concept and guest curator); García, María Amalia; Agnew, Michael (translations) (2011). Witschey, Erica; Fundación Juan March (eds.). América fría. La abstracción geométrica en Latinoamerica (1934–1973) (Exhibition catalog) (in Spanish). Madrid: Fundación Juan March. ISBN 978-8-470-75586-6. OCLC 810113820. Wikidata () – Folleto de la expoción celebrada América fría. La abstracción geométrica en Latinoamerica (1934–1973) en la Fundación Juan March en Madrid del 11 de febrero al 15 de mayo de 2011
  - "Regarding the Frame" (1950) by Rhod Rothfuss p. 432

== See also ==
- Concrete art
- Grupo Madí
