= Volf Roitman =

Uruguayan-born French painter and sculptor

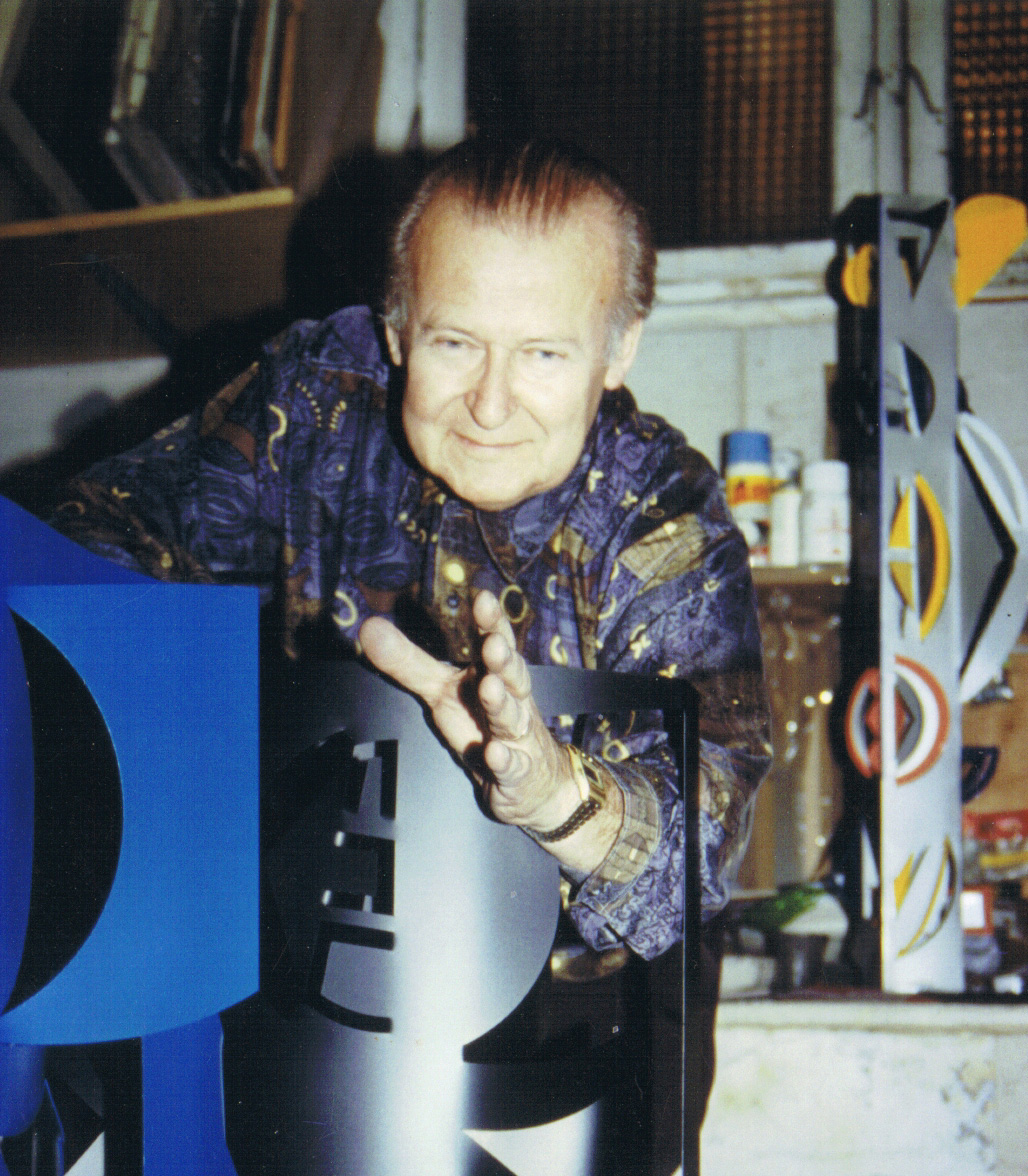
Volf Roitman

Volf Roitman (Russian: Волф Ройтман) (30 December 1930 in Montevideo, Uruguay – 25 April 2010) was a painter, sculptor and architect, sometimes referred to as a Renaissance Man, the son of Jewish Russian/Romanian parents.

He grew up in Argentina where he received a degree in architecture whilst co-editing a cult poetry magazine. At age twenty, he moved to Paris where, with Carmelo Arden Quin, founder of the Latin American movement MADI, instantly morphed into a painter while helping to relaunch MADI, first in France and eventually across four continents. Moving between countries and cultures – he has lived in Spain, the United Kingdom, Ireland, and finally outside of Tampa, Florida, in the United States– and although eventually distanced from the MADI movement's official conservative views, he remained always faithful to its concepts of ludic invention and whimsical humor within the boundaries of colorful geometric abstraction.

"Roitman is considered one of the great MADI creators. His disposition for aesthetic playfulness illustrates the very essence of the movement. Forms, colors, invention and imagination blend in a superabundance that alerts us to the existence of exceptional creation… …His sculptures - lamps, torches of the imagination – serve to corroborate the sense of liberty that runs through all of MADI creation "... Most recently, Roitman started to produce large transformable wall hangings called MADI Banners on silk and metal, some of which are applied on transparent surfaces glowing as stained glass windows. He has also taken his work to new dimensions by covering ordinary buildings, such as the Wood Building in Marshall, Texas and the MADI Museum in Dallas, with his vividly colored, three-dimensional panels, thus creating giant MADI "sculpture" pieces. Of the latter building, LA Weekly critic Peter Frank wrote, "The building … marks a landmark in recent history of art … Not since the Museum of non-Objective Art in New York morphed into the Guggenheim Museum more than half a century ago has there been anything like this in North America."

MADI has proved itself to be the longest-running, continuously active art movement in the world. The entity which Arden Quin and Roitman formed in 1951 eventually evolved into MADI International, that today comprises some sixty artists working on four continents.

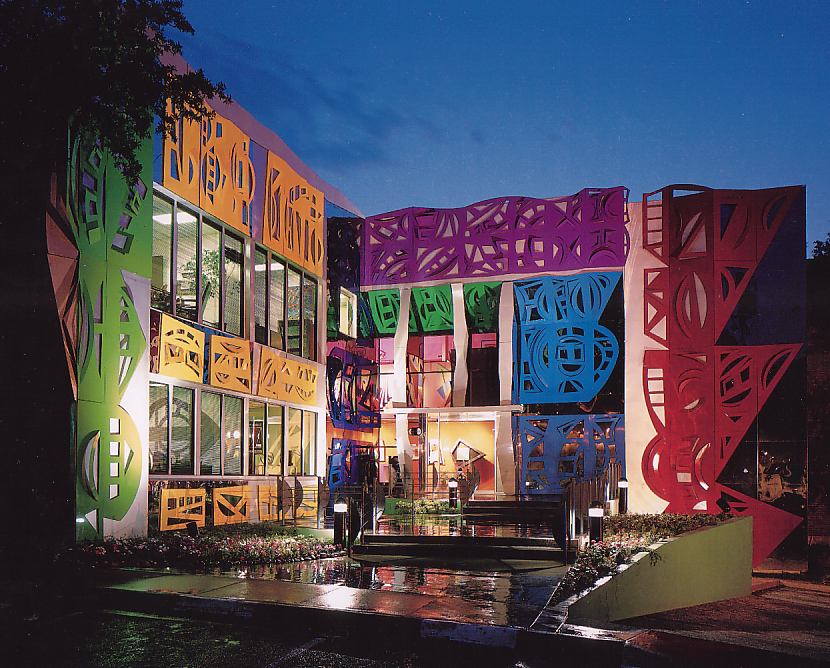
MADI Museum (Dallas, Tx.) 2002–2003. Facades designed by Volf Roitman

== Early years ==
In 1951, Roitman moved to Paris, where he met the founder of the MADI movement, the Uruguayan master painter Carmelo Arden Quin. Following Roitman's proposal, both artists created the MADI Research and Study Center (for experimental art), which functioned through the 50s in Arden Quin's Montparnasse studio, an open workshop and research facility which significantly influenced the work of numerous European and North and South American artists then studying and working in the confines of the School of Paris. The Center promoted (1) non-figurative works with irregularly-shaped forms in flat, sharply defined colors; (2) the systemization of articulated, transformable and mechanized sculpture; and (3) an interdisciplinary approach to the arts first promoted by the Futurists but systemized, starting in the 40s, by MADI and by other groups such as Fluxus. In the field of MADI sculpture, massive structures are replaced by a dynamic relationship between the liness and planes of solid forms and the openings with which these forms are pierced. Space thus becomes an integral and equally important part of the work.

Roitman navigated through the Parisian avant-garde scene of cafes, studios and galleries where he drew his main inspiration during those years from the Belgian master George Vantongerloo. He was also inspired with a work from the Musée d'Art Moderne de la Ville de Paris: Malevich's 1915 seminal work Carré blanc sur fond blanc. "Already plunged into the worlds of Celtic myths, alchemy, and Zen Buddhism, Roitman believed that somewhere in this pale world of absent color, he might discover the absolute. From the beginning, his personal style involved a predominant use of circles, a complete break with Piet Mondrian’s sacrosanct straight linear structures and his orthogonal rigidity, a heresy for which he, like Georges Vantongerloo would often be signaled out and, on occasion, rebucked." Roger Neyrat, a French artist and a veteran of MADI in the 50s, still remembers: "I held this work (a Roitman painting, called The Lost Triangle -1953) above myself, ready to make it circulate among the few dozens of people assisting at my reading at Claude Dorval Gallery (1995)…It's the most beautiful MADI work, repeated Carmelo several times. We haven't ever gone so far in our abstract works!" Roger Neyrat continues: "But beginning in 1956, Roitman initiated a series of more complex compositions where the design became more dynamic, the curves more playful and dancing. Two years later, in New York City, this process led to his series of “Memories of Balanchine” (1958–1960), real MADI ballets...A pure joy and an example for new generations. There is so much of joyful emotion on these works, a rare gift even with the great abstract masters. Roitman has gone even further!"

During this period, Roitman's paintings were exhibited at the following venues:

- Salon des Réalités Nouvelles, Paris: 1952 – 53 – 54 – 55 -56.
- Galerie Suzanne Michel, Paris, February 1953
- Cercle Paul Valéry, La Sorbonne, Paris, 15 June 1953.
- Galerie de l’Odéon, Paris February 1954.
- Galerie Cimaise, in the show "14 Abstract Artistes", Paris, January 1955 acquis les bases solides de l’évolution picturale qui se manifestait alors.
- In November, 1955, Volf Roitman's exhibition at the Galérie de Beaune in Paris constituted the first solo show by a MADI artist in Europe.
- Galerie Denise René, Paris, a group show in April 1956 .

From 1961 to 1982, Roitman consecrated himself mainly to literature and other creative activities.

== The Var – Barcelona – 1979–1998 ==
In 1979, although retaining his near Paris residence until 1984, Roitman started progressively to live most of the year in Montauroux, a village in the Var, behind the French Riviera.

In 1982, Roitman produced his first 3-dimensional collages. That same year, from 12 February to 10 March, the Espace Donguy, Paris, presented Mouvances MADI, Lieu 5, a group of artists which included works by Roitman, together with A.Q. Nunez, Neyrat, Alocco, Asis, Belleudy, Blaine, Bory, Chubac, Fejer, Monticelli and Vardánega. This exhibition marked the beginning of Roitman's return to the visual arts, even though he was also still writing and working in the film business. Since then, Roitman's work has been featured in over 100 MADI group and one-man shows, gallery and museum exhibitions, art fairs and auctions on four continents. Among the most important shows and events:

4–30 November 1984: Exhibition of Arte MADI, 1946–1984, Attualita de un Movimento, variation on the de la Salle show in Oct., held at Il Salotto Gallerie d’Arte, Como, Italy. Manifesto called Perchè Arte MADI written by Salvador Presta and signed by A.Q., Presta, de la Salle, Roitman and Esposito.

April 1991: Inauguration of Arte Concreto Invención, Arte MADI, an important historical book and retrospective organized by Miklos von Bartha at the Haus für Konstructive und Konkrete Kunst in Zurich, Switzerland. MADI historical artists in show are Arden Quin, Volf Roitman, Juan Bay, Martín Blaszko, Gyula Kosice, and Rhod Rothfuss. (see this Book)

April 1992: Abstraction Geometrique show at the Galerie de la Salle, St-Paul-de-Vence. Participants are Arden Quin, Bolivar, Chubac, Demarco, Garcia-Rossi, Lapeyrère, Melé, Poirot-Matsuda, Faucon, Belleudy, Caporicci, Desserprit, Le Cousin, Nemours, Presta, Blaszko, Caral, Decq, Girodon, Jonquière, Leppien, Piemonti, Sobrino, and Roitman, who is now working full-time on his paper collages and starting to apply the same three-dimensional principles of his collages to his first metal work, reliefs and sculpture pieces. From this period on, he will again show his work on a regular basis with the MADIstes.

From 1992 to 2005, Roitman became both head of Communication and Archivist for the MADI Movement. April 1993 : One-man show of Roitman's recent decoupages and his historical pieces from the 50s inaugurated at the St. Charles de Rose Gallery in Paris, and from May 7 to June 5 at the Helios Gallery in Calais, France. From 10 June to 15 September 1993, Roitman was one of the main organizers of a MADI show at the Chateau St-Cirq-Lapopie (Lot), France, a space formerly devoted to André Breton and the Surrealists, with 40 MADI artists participating. Painting, sculpture and poetic acts. (See catalogues)

9 April 1994: Inauguration of the one-man show Volf Roitman, Obras MADI at Centro de Arte La Rectoria, St-Pere-de-Vilamajor (Greater Barcelona), Spain, curated by Josep Plandiura. A room at the show is devoted to an introduction of the MADI concept to the Spanish public, and it was here that Roitman first showed his Proteus sculptures – cardboard decoupage encased in molded plastic frames and suspended from large metal stands.

1995: 8 June: In conjunction with Carmelo Arden Quin: 44 Ans Après, exhibition at Claude Dorval Gallery, Paris. Show commemorates meeting in Paris, 44 years earlier, of Arden Quin and Roitman and their founding of the MADI Research and Study Center in Arden Quin's Montparnasse studio. A conference, attended by Tomás Maldonado, founder of the Argentine movement, Asociación Arte Concreto-Invención, and a former member of MADI Argentina, is given by Roger Neyrat and Volf Roitman in the Dorval gallery on June 18. 6 October: Inauguration of Continuidad MADI show at the Centoira Gallery in Buenos Aires together with works by A.Q., Blaszko, Bolivar and Laperèyre. Oct. 30-Dec. 30: MADI, Anterioridad y Continuidad MADI exhibition at Museo Torres García - Montevideo., Montevideo, Uruguay. Historical and recent works with Arden Quin and Bolivar.

1996: 7 March– 3 April: MADI Internacional, 50 Ans Despuès, a groundbreaking international exhibition curated by Cesar Lopez-Osornio and shown at the Centro de Exposiciónes y Congresos of the Ibercaja Bank in Zaragoza, Spain. Roitman writes the historical section of the catalogue and the MADI chronology, and he shows his works with 56 MADI artists from France, Belgium, Italy, Hungary, Spain, Japan, Argentina, Venezuela, United States and Uruguay which officially introduces MADI art in Spain. March 28–May 10: Inauguration of MADI: Dopo Il Rettancolo show at Arte Struktura Gallery in Milan, focused on the works of three MADI artists: Arden Quin, Salvador Presta and Roitman. 20 September, at the Albuquerque Museum, Roitman gave a conference in which he introduced his philosophy of MADI-Ludico architecture, the ideas for which grew out of his works with 3-dimensional collages and laser-cut sculpture: "Strictly polygonal design of asymmetric façades ...geometric forms with sharply defined colors and contours, tri-dimensional surfaces, a clearly 'ludico' (playful) spirit...the same basic computer program can produce an almost inexhaustible series of different exterior panels. This system provides us with the means to overthrow the tyranny of the module which has, with few exceptions, ruled architecture from the time of ancient Egypt..." The same day, in the same city, he inaugurated a solo show at the Arte Struktura Gallery. In October 1996, Roitman obtained a commission to design and build a model for his project of a MADI-Ludico building designated for a site in downtown Dallas.

1997: 30 June to 20 October: "Arte MADI", a vast retrospective curated by Maria-Lluisa Borràs for Museo Nacional Centro de Arte Reina Sofía, Madrid, with a 300-page catalogue in Spanish and English chronicling MADI history from its origins to the movement's present activities on 4 continents. Historical works by Roitman from the 50s and 2 contemporary sculpture pieces. In addition, an entire room at the Reina Sofía is devoted to a Roitman architectural model – his vision of a MADI building “where constant interplays of light and shadow situated the edifice in a chimerical constructivist category ... a game of spatial echoes”. Extracts of Roitman “Manifesto in favor of a MADI-Ludico Architecture” were published in the 300 page catalogue (see catalogue)

26 September to 31 October: Hors Cadre, exhibit of the works of Arden Quin and Volf Roitman, curated by Roberto Vignola for the Galerie Alexandre Mottier in Geneva. Da MADI à MADI, vast retrospective held at the Civica Galleria d’Arte Moderna in Gallarate (Greater Milan), Italy, curated by Emma Zanella Manara and Anna Canali and featuring works of 44 artists working today in MADI International and a historical section spotlighting the works of Arden Quin, Blaszko, Presta and Roitman. This Milan contemporary museum has since opened a new wing designed to display its permanent collection of MADI works.

== Between Florida and West Cork (1998- ) ==
Since 1998, Roitman works out of studios in Tampa, Florida and West Cork, Ireland. In November 1999, he presented a solo show at the Sarasota Visual Art Center, about which the renowned art critic Marcia Corbino wrote: “The Sarasota Visual Art center has mounted a MADI festival which may earn the Arts Center a niche in the history of 20th century art.” One month later, Roitman unveiled a large metal wall relief commissioned by the Palmer Foundation of Houston, for the north wall of the Sarasota Center. Roitman originated and helped to organize the first North American exhibition exclusively devoted to MADI: "Outside the Box: Eleven International MADI Artists Featuring Carmelo Arden Quin and Volf Roitman From the Masterson and The Lenherr Collections," shown at the Polk Museum in Lakeland, Florida from August to October 2001 and at the Gulf Coast Museum in Largo, Florida, from November to January 2002.

Starting in January 2002, he created the entrance facade of the MADI Museum and was named its artistic director. The Museum and Gallery in the Uptown quarter of Dallas was inaugurated on 22 February 2003. The building's two principal facades were completely transformed by two-store high sculptural works specially created by Roitman during a fifteen-month period – asymmetrical pieces of the bright colors, drenched in ludic or whimsical cuts and folds and bolted to a mirrored background. This lightning bolt transformation of a pedestrian office building into a sculptural work is considered by Roitman to be the culmination of his own life devoted entirely to the arts. For the museum's opening exhibition, a cornucopia of Roitman works was also on show – a mechanized moving tower, an explanatory mechanized sculpture entitled What Is MADI?, a wall of metal and Plexiglas "portholes", his abstract and stylized version of "the Movies", and other important pieces. Roitman also designed the museum's interior, including the transformation of an interior wall of the building's great hall into a unique sculptural piece of color and metal decoupages.

From 9 November 2002 to 5 January 2003 "Heart and Mind – The Art of Volf Roitman," featured at the Leepa-Rattner Museum of Art in Tarpon Springs, Florida. From July 9 to August 20, 2006, The Leepa-Rattner Museum presented "The Moving MADI World of Volf Roitman." "The Roitman Gallery provides the real playground" (Lennie Bennet in the St. Petersburg Times of 9 July 2006.)

== The Renaissance Man ==
=== Theatre, literature and movies ===
As both an artist and a man, Uruguayan-born, Argentine-educated, and Parisian-nurtured Volf Roitman is as difficult to seize as a woodland faun; as impossible to define as his multi-faceted, constantly changing kinetic sculptures.

Since his childhood, Roitman was attracted by the arts. Child-actor, he played in radio theater and recited poems for the benefit of the Allies of World War II during World War II. From 1946 to 1950, he was member of theatre groups "Tinglado" and "La Cima". Roitman began his professional life prosaically enough as a Buenos Aires architectural student. With a degree in hand, however, he quickly morphed into a poet, acting as the co-editor of a cutting-edge magazine called Poesía Buenos Aires. Still only 21 and sponsored by the French Embassy in Buenos Aires, he next found himself on a liner bound for France.

Architecture, poetry and theater were cast to the ocean winds. Once in Paris, he decided, he would perfect his French at the Sorbonne and become a novelist as famous as Sartre or Camus, with the vitriol of Alfred Jarry thrown in for good measure. Fate in the form of fellow Uruguayan Carmelo Arden Quin would decide otherwise. Although master painter Arden Quin was 18 years older than his newest protégé, the duo soon functioned as complementary pieces of an avant-garde puzzle. Starting at the end of the 60s, MADI zigzagged in and out of Roitman's life; on occasion, he wrote the prefaces for Arden Quin shows and mulled over the idea of making collages. Mostly, however, he returned to writing – turning out plays, novels and satirical political pamphlets. His childhood and teen's love for the theatre stroked again and he wrote from 1956 to 1958 two experimental plays: Cesquetucroy and The Professor Omnium. About these works, André Breton, wrote "As much on the dramatic as the poetic level, your creation has made me discover a spring of utter beauty, one which is both wonderfully enveloped and 'effervescently new'." During a three-year stint in the United States, from 1958 to the end of 1960 he and his first wife Rita Parr formed the Ion Theatre Group. At the Orpheum Theater in New York, in October 1960, Roitman produced the prelude to his quirky MADI play Thaswachuthink! His New York paintings, including the series of Memory of Balanchine, the last visual works he produced until 1982, were shown in the hall of the theater.

(Certain scenes of play Thaswachuthink! were staged once more, by Diana Forgioni, at the Leepa Rattner Museum in July 2006.)

Following his return to Paris, at the end of 1960, and until 1970, Roitman supported his artistic activities by forming a company specialized in model-making and design and in the installation of booths. He built three models reproducing Normandy's beaches and villages where Dwight D. Eisenhower's Army invasion took place, for the 20th Century film The Longest Day, and later, some of the largest (up to 55 square meters) architectural projects of this period.

In 1962, under the pseudonym Alvar Dazil, he published the novel The Liquid Wall, dealing with the plight of European refugees in South America after World War I. The same year, Roitman and Arden Quin launched Ailleurs (8 issues until 1966), a French revue which published the latest in experimental art; and in the seventies, he also became involved in Parisian avant-garde film and literature.

In 1969, under the pseudonym Guillaume Roux, he wrote the play Blue Like An Orange, a prize-winner in the 1969 Enghien (France) Dramatic Art Competition.

In 1972, again under the pseudonym Guillaume Roux, he published the novel The Amerloques (The Yanks), a story of expatriate Americans in Paris, Presses de la Cité, Paris. From 1970 to 1982, together with his second wife Shelley Goodman, he was director of their film company Shelltrie Productions. An eclectic cinematographic career (productions of short films, script writing, introduction into France of films from Hungary, Czechoslovakia, Yugoslavia, Iran, Kuwait, etc., distribution; owner of a 2-screen art house in the Beaubourg section of Paris) 1981: Published Don Quixote and Sancho Panza in Feudal Country, a pamphlet that became famous in the cinema profession, where Roitman denounced the abuses of the monopolistic cinema system of distribution circuits: In 1985, under the pseudonym Dupond Dupont, he published another pamphlet: D'Où Vient la M… ( From Where the Sh...is Coming.) Roitman, invoking illustrious examples as Rabelais, uses the entire word.

(Certain scenes of play Thaswachuthink! were staged once more, by Diana Forgioni, at the Leepa Rattner Museum in July 2006.)

== Return to visual arts ==
The siren song of MADI called again. All of Roitman's frenzied activity gradually gelled into an enduring passion for a particular style of architectural sculpture where each morsel of his past experience found its niche. Starting with a two-dimensional surface and using only a box-cutter and his own dexterity, he arrived at three-dimensionality – complex abstract sculpture pieces formed from a single sheet of paper. On the surface, this cutout and folded work from the early 80s and 90s might seem a derivative of Japanese origami, but in reality its complex and whimsical nature is closer to children's pop-up books of the Victorian era.

The magic of laser cutting soon led to metal sculptures so delicately and intricately delineated that they were often mistaken for the paper collages that had preceded them ten years before. Roitman's obsessions with asymmetry and the ludico whimsical also found their way into MADI new concepts that he kept mastering. This led to the kinetic pieces he showed at the Leepa-Rattner Museum of Art in 2002 and 2006...rotational towers and mural works, as geometric in form as sea anemones, swaying and grasping to the rhythm of unseen currents while curious organic parts open and close...The spectator has no need to walk around these sculptures; every facet will be revealed as color-drenched undulating forms change with each 360 degree turn the piece.

Roitman's interests in literature, cinema and politics also came together in his newest Project – large MADI "books" dedicated to The Celebration of Dissent, with Mae West and Groucho Marx sharing places of honor with other revolutionaries – the serious and the less so.
