= Alfredo Hlito =

Argentine painter (1923–1993)

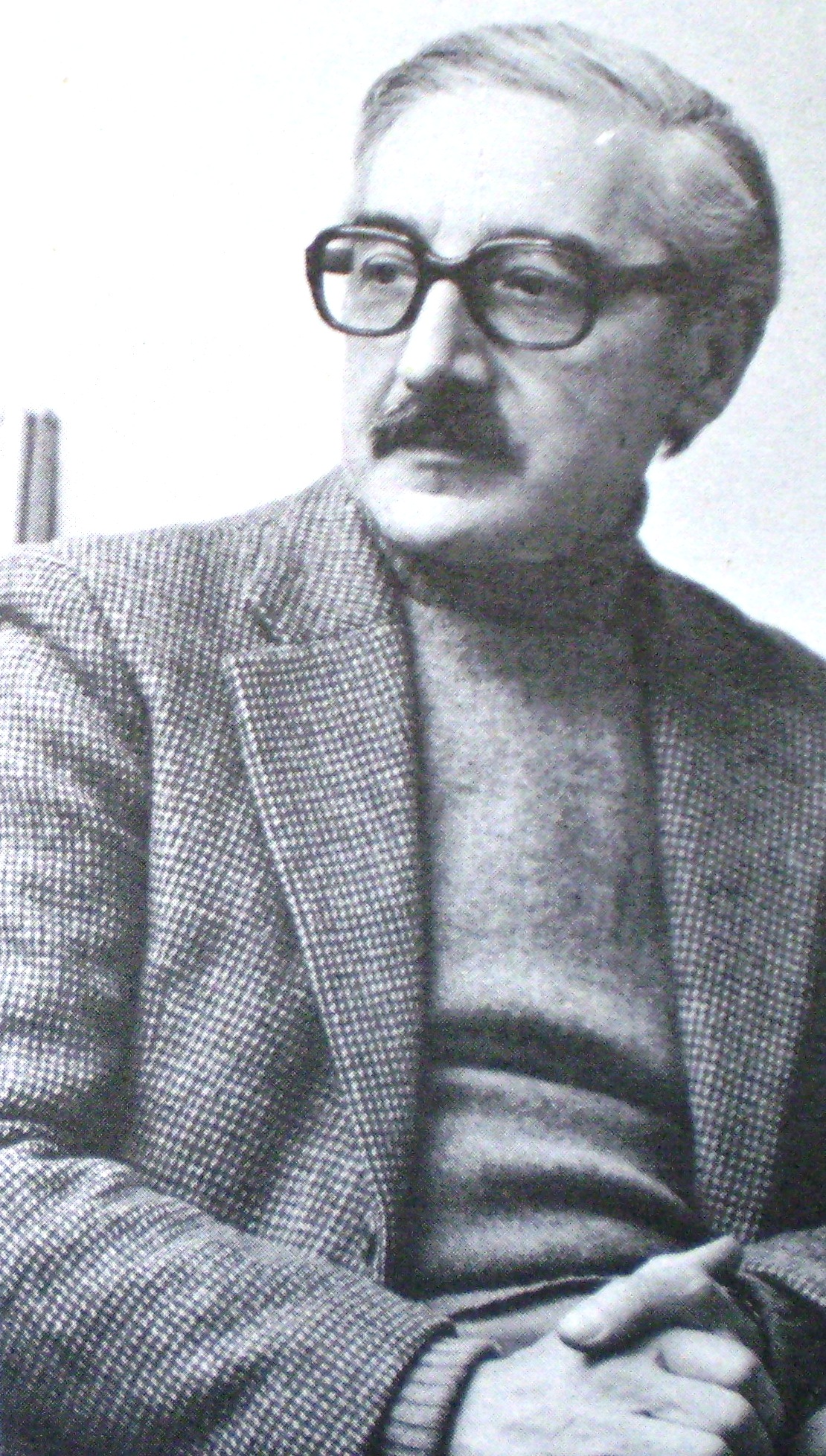
- Hlito, c. 1980
- Born: Alfredo Hlito Oliveri; 4 May 1923; Buenos Aires, Argentina
- Died: 28 March 1993 (aged 69); Buenos Aires, Argentina
- Occupations: painter; writer
- Organization: Concrete Art-Invention Association (1945–1946)
- Style: concrete art
- Awards: Konex Award (1982, 1992)

Alfredo Hlito Oliveri (4 May 1923 – 28 March 1993) was an Argentine painter and writer associated with the concrete art movement. He was a founding member of the Concrete Art-Invention Association and a signatory of the 1942 Manifiesto de Cuatro Jóvenes.

== Early life ==
Alfredo Hlito was born on 4 May 1923 in Buenos Aires to Syrian immigrants. He entered the Prilidiano Pueyrredón National Fine Arts School in 1938, and in 1942 began studying at the National University of the Arts. His early art style was heavily influenced by Spanish-Uruguayan painter Joaquín Torres-García.

== Career ==
In the early 1940s, Hlito belonged to a group of young Buenos Aires artists sharing a studio in Barrio Norte who disagreed with the traditional Argentine figurative art style in favor of more avant-garde styles. In 1942, alongside Jorge Brito, Claudio Girola, and Tomás Maldonado, Hlito co-authored and signed the Manifiesto de Cuatro Jóvenes, a pamphlet which criticized both the National Art Exhibition of Buenos Aires (Salón Nacional de Buenos Aires) competition and the greater Argentine painting scene. The controversy caused by this document led to both his expulsion from the National University of the Arts and his propulsion to notability.

In 1945, Hlito co-founded the Concrete Art-Invention Association (Asociación Arte Concreto-Invención, AACI) alongside Girola, Maldonado, Enio Iommi, Lidy Prati, Raúl Lozza, Manuel Espinoza, and Juan Melé. He left AACI in 1946 and focused on organizing concrete art exhibitions in Buenos Aires, most notably the Nuevas Realidades exhibition at the Van Riel Gallery in 1948. During the late 1940s, he contributed drawings and essays on constructivism in the Arte Concreto magazine.

Hlito, Maldonado, and Carlos Méndez Mosquera founded the magazine Nueva Visión in 1951 which sought to highlight little known Argentine avant-garde artists. The magazine was published from 1951 to 1957. In 1954, he exhibited at the second São Paulo Biennial, at which he received the Acquisition Award (Premio Adquisición). In 1955, he exhibited at the 28th Venice Biennale.

Hlito moved to Mexico in 1964, where he resided until 1973. In 1980, he participated in an exhibit at the Eduardo Sívori Museum in Buenos Aires that highlighted the 1940s concrete art output of both AACI and Grupo Madí. He became a professor at the National University of the Arts in 1984. In 1987, the university held a retrospective exhibit of his works, called Alfredo Hlito, Paintings 1945-1985. In 1990, he participated in an exhibit dedicated to AACI and Grupo Madí at the Rachel Adler Gallery in New York.

Following his death on 28 March 1993 in Buenos Aires, his works were featured in a European traveling exhibition called Art from Argentina 1920/1994, which began in 1994 at Oxford University and ended in 1995 at the Borges Cultural Center in Buenos Aires. He was honored with an anthology exhibition in Madrid in 2002.

He was a recipient of the Konex Award twice, in 1982 and 1992, for his contributions to the non-figurative painting discipline.

== Style ==
Hlito mostly worked with oil paint until the 1970s when he switched to acrylic paint. Alongside concrete art, he experimented with Neoplasticism and Pointillism. He primarily painted outdoor scenes, interspersing colors to contrast light and shadow and used straight and curved lines to represent landscapes. He painted with a technique he called espectros (lit. spectra) which consists of applying regular and rhomboidal brushstrokes, using colors diluted to the point of transparency, which gave luminosity to the paintings.

== Notable works ==
- Líneas tangentes (1956), oil, 1.39 m x 1.19 m (4.6 ft x 3.9 ft), National Museum of Fine Arts
- Simetría (1958), oil, 1 m x 0.7 m (3.3 ft x 2.3 ft), private collection
- Espectro (1959), oil, 1.3 m x 1.5 m (4.3 ft x 4.9 ft), private collection
- Efigie (1977), acrylic, 1.4 m x 0.7 m (4.6 ft x 2.3 ft), private collection
