= Asociación Arte Concreto-Invención =

Argentine art movement

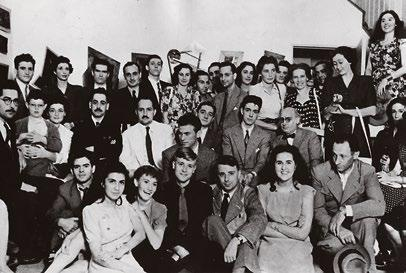
Segunda exposición de Arte Concreto Invención en la casa de Grete Stern, 1945.

The Asociación Arte Concreto-Invención (AACI) is an Argentine art movement that focuses on Concrete Art. Following WWII, numerous pieces Latin American art as well as several Latin American artists used themes regarding Socialism and Reconstruction. Artists from the AACI proposed, for the first time in the history of Argentina, the necessity for an art that was different from symbolic, representational, and expressionistic art. They believed that their artwork, or "inventions" could harbor social change in their current Argentine political climate. The founders of the AACI showed similar themes throughout their artworks, such as a desire to appear with universality, objectivity, and lack any sort of representativeness.

== Formation ==
The formation of the Asociación Arte Concreto-Invención officially happened in 1945. The creators of this organization were primarily Tómas Maldonado, Lidy Prati, Alfredo Hlito, Raúl Lozza, Enio Lommi, Manuel Espinosa, and Juan Melé. The creation of the AACI happened because of a difference in artistic beliefs. Maldonado and Prati were married during this time period, despite being in the same artistic group and movement. In 1944, Maldonado, Rhod Rothfuss, Gyula Kosice, Lidy Prati, and Carmelo Arden Quin produced the first and only issue of the illustrated magazine Arturo. The appearance of Arturo was the beginning of a distinct revolutionary period in Argentine art. The magazine expressed the founders' shared opposition of representational and symbolic art. However, from the magazine, two artistic groups emerged. Grupo Madi, led by Arden Quin, Kosice, and Rothfuss. And Asociación Arte Concreto-Invención led by Maldonado and Prati.

== Influences ==
The first influence that happened upon the world of Latin American art regarding Concrete Art came from the works of Joaquín Torres-Garcia. In 1936, Torres-Garcia had already referred to invention, speaking about those movements that put new art styles to use, such as Impressionism or Cubism. From Torres-Garcia, came the entirety of the Concrete art movement. Maldonado had a noticeable impact on the AACI because of his restraints he put on the artists and artworks. His political views seemed to influence his views on artwork. Maldonado was a Marxist who had certain utopian ambitions for the art created by the AACI in a new revolutionary societal movement in Latin America. The political views demonstrated by AACI members were often communistic and somewhat socialistic as well. While simultaneously following the purist aesthetics of artists such as Piet Mondrian and Theo van Doesburg. The art group rapidly began making waves among the art world and by 1946, Prati and Maldonado had attracted the interest of one of the original practicing concrete artists in Switzerland, Max Bill.

== Arturo Magazine ==
The aforementioned magazine was the first work by the members of the AACI before they were officially together as a group. The concepts “invention” and “trimmed frame” are used to portray the movement of Concrete Art. These terms originated with the issuing of the Arturo magazine, and are perhaps the most original contributions to the Concrete Art movement. Arden Quin discussed about invention in Arturo’s first article. He rose against Expressionism, Surrealism, and any form of Realism in his works. This is a common theme among the group and among concrete artists as a whole. Regarding the appearance of Arturo, Ana J. Pozzi-Harris writes, "In the Argentina of the early 1940s, no artist or movement held truly comparable ideas to those exposed in Arturo or in the early exhibitions of the Concrete and Madí artists. Exhibition reviews show that the most successful Argentine artists from this period worked in styles which may be categorized as classical and academic; picturesque and romantic; and expressionist." For a description of the magazine, the cover was an engraving by Tomás Maldonado and in the inner pages were seen several pieces by this artist and by Lidy Prati as well. There also were essays and poems by Edgard Bailey, Gyula Kosice, Torres-García, Vicente Huidobro and Murilo Mendes, and projects reproduced by Vieira Da Silva, Torres-García, Augusto Torres, Kandinsky, Mondrian and Rothfuss. An important influence that can be seen in the magazine is from the Dutch artist Theo Van Doesburg. He formulated in “Basis of the Concrete painting”, in Paris, April 1930. Van Doesburg described concrete art by stating,

"1) Art is universal.

2) The work of art must be conceived and entirely shaped by the spirit before its execution. It must not receive anything from the given shapes of nature, neither from sensuality, nor from sentimentality. We want to exclude lyricism, drama, symbolism, etc.

3) The picture must be entirely built with purely plastic elements, that is to say, planes and colors. A pictorial element has no other significance but that of “itself”.

4) The construction of the picture, as well as that of its elements, must be simple and visually controllable.

5) The technique must be mechanical, that is to say, exact, anti-impressionist.

6) Endeavor for absolute clearness.”

These guidelines for Concrete Art truly united all of the contributor's when creating their artworks for Arturo. Their similar beliefs led to a criticism of all art that could be interpreted, the AACI wanted to have their works be viewed with simplicity and with no forms of interpretation.

== Madí and the AACI ==
From the publication of Arturo, two similar Argentine artistic groups emerged. These aforementioned groups both believed in the artistic style of Concrete art, however, their perspectives of this type of artwork differed. The Madí's members worked in various ways; they often distributed small posters and pamphlets in the streets of Buenos Aires. They also published the magazine Arte Madí Universal from 1947 to 1954 and organized art showings that mixed types visual art, poetry, music, and performance to create an encapsulating Concrete Art experience. Their art emphasized materials and the reality of these materials, often changing the conventional frame for strangely shaped canvases and frames to encapsulate their works. In 1946, both groups publicly announced their separations and different agendas through their manifestos. For the AACI, Maldonado read the "Manifiesto Invencionista" (Inventionist Manifesto) in March 1946 at their first exhibition in the Salón Peuser. The Madí read their Manifiesto Madí (Madí Manifesto) altogether at the Instituto Francés de Estudios Superiores in August 1946. Most of the art created by both groups was during the rule of the Argentine president Juan Domingo Perón. Perón was a former Colonel in the Argentine army whom assumed the power of President of Argentina in February 1946. Perón's extremely authoritarian rule many called "Fascist" used means of mass propaganda, mass appeal, and outright oppressive measures to remain in control of Argentina until 1955. Scholars suggest the political climate of the Peronian era had a direct influence on both the AACI and the Madí. Both parties attempted to use their Communist influence to combat the Perón agenda.

== Selected Artworks ==
Serial Composition: A piece made by Lidy Prati, done in 1948, and held in the Latin American Art Museum of Buenos Aires. The Dutch artist Piet Mondrian is historically found to be a crucial influence on the art of Prati and connections are often made about this piece and his works. This artwork shows a theme of systematic geometric abstraction which can be interpreted through the various red, white, and black rectangles or squares spaced equally far apart from one another in a grid format. This style of equidistant geometric shapes was often seen from various artists in the AACI.

Coplanar Nº13: An artwork made by Juan Melé in 1946 that consists of three different shapes made of wood, colored with oil paint and connected by a metal rod behind each of the shapes. The style used makes an appearance to the viewer that the geometric objects float in front of the wall behind them. Melé often experimented with various frames, backgrounds, and colors. His distinct artistic format is easily recognizable in this piece. Coplanar Nº13 simultaneously shows the core values of the AACI in its universality and lacking of any symbolism or representational effect.

Composition: This oil on canvas painting by Tómas Maldonado depicts multiple colored and black lines of different width meeting near the center of the piece to form a rectangular shape. This piece was created in 1950 and is currently being held in the National Museum of Fine Arts in Argentina. Regarding the painting, author María Amalia Garcia describes, "Composición is based on neo-plastic postulates that seek to exalt the white surface by way of tension generated between different elements inscribed on that support."

Development of a Triangle: Another oil on canvas painting by Maldonado that exhibits different sized triangles along with several intersecting black lines coming down the canvas. It is currently being held at the Museum of Modern Art in New York. The piece demonstrates geometric abstraction and follows the strict regiments of any artwork that is considered to be related to the AACI.
