= Lidy Prati =

Argentine artist (1921–2008)

- Born: Lidia Prati; 1921; Resistencia, Chaco, Argentina
- Died: 2008 (aged 86–87); Buenos Aires, Argentina
- Known for: Painting
- Style: Abstract art

Lidia "Lidy" Elena Prati (1921–2008) was an Argentine painter who was known for her abstract, geometric paintings. Her artwork called into question representational art and was influential in defining the concrete art movement in Latin America. Prati contributed to the publication of Arturo magazine and during the 1940s, was one of the founding members of the Asociación Arte Concreto-Invención (AACI) art movement (or Concrete-Invention Art Association) along with Enio Iommi and Tomás Maldonado. While she is primarily known for her concrete art paintings, Prati also worked in graphic and layout design and worked with textiles and jewelry.

== Biography ==
Lidia Elena Prati was born in Resistencia, Chaco, Argentina in 1921 into an Italian and Swiss-German immigrant family. Her father, Olinto Prati, a native of Longiana, Italy, and her mother, Hilda Usinger, from the Cañada de Gómez province of Santa Fe, were married around 1916. Her father had been a public accountant in Italy, though, in Argentina, he abandoned this profession and became a prominent textile industrialist, earning him the title, "The Cotton King" of Chaco. He also produced kaolin, wood fiber, chemical products, and owned several car dealerships (Ford, Renault, and IKA). His success in these industries provided him with financial assets integral in the creation and publication of Arturo magazine.

As a child, Prati lived with her family in Chatara, Chaco where her father's business was based, though when she was 6, she lived with her grandparents for a year in Rimini, Italy where she learned Italian language and culture.

In the 1930s, Prati and her sister Pierina began attending the religious boarding school, Nuestra Señora de la Misterordia, in Rosario. In 1936, at 15, Prati began school at the Instituto Inmaculado Corazón de Maria "Adoratrices", a traditional Catholic school in Buenos Aires. Shortly after her enrollment, she began living with her uncle Francisco Prati in a luxurious apartment building where she came into contact with culture, art, and music.

In 1938, Prati received her teaching degree from Las Adoratrices, and in 1942 she moved back in with her parents who had recently moved from Chaco to Buenos Aires.

In 1942 she had her first-ever exhibition at the Salon Peuser in Buenos Aires.

On 11 March in 1944, despite her parents' wishes, Prati married artist Tomás Maldonado with whom she had started taking art classes from two years prior. For the next eight years, they participated in collaborations and exhibitions together. In 1952, however, Prati and Maldonado separated and she traveled to Europe with her parents where she studied Renaissance paintings and met with several artists including George Vantongerloo, Max Bill, Giacomo Balla, and Piero Dorazio. In 1954, Prati and Maldonado began their divorce proceedings, at which time Prati stopped painting, though she continued to draw.

For the next part of her life, Prati had several different careers. She continued her artistic career by working as a graphic and layout designer. She also began to work as a clothing and jewelry designer. From 1971 to 2001, Prati worked for the Argentine Ministero Relaciones Exteriores. In the 1980s, she served as secretary to diplomatic directors of the Department of Western. She performed administrative tasks at the Ministero and in 1980 traveled to Tunisia. Prati worked as an art critic on a radio program from 1970 to 1974 and for the art magazine Artinf, which she had co-founded with Silvia de Ambrosini, Odile Baron Supervielle, and Germaine Derbecq.

Prati's life after divorcing Maldonado did not come without challenges. From 1960 on, Prati had several psychiatric episodes. In the early 1960s, she was hospitalized at Hospital Pirovano in Buenos Aires, and another time while she was in Tunisia. Prati also experienced unstable financial circumstances due to the loss of her family's business after the death of her father in 1964.

Prati died on 19 August 2008, in Buenos Aires, Argentina.

== Career ==
Prati's artistic career began in 1944 when she began taking art classes with Thomás Maldonado after her cousin, María Victoria "Bimbi" Prati had met the young artist in a chance encounter. The basic drawing classes she took in school and Maldonado's classes would be the only were the only training she received, leading her to proclaim herself a self-taught artist. In 1942 she had her first ever exhibition at the Salon Peuser in Buenos Aires.

In 1944, Prati contributed her artwork to the one-time publication Arturo. This publication was spearheaded by a group of artists, including Carmelo Arden Quin, Gyula Kosice, and Rhod Rothfuss, Maldonado, Edgar Bayley, Joaquín Torres García, Piet Mondrian, and Wassily Kandinsky. These artists were among those with whom she had begun meeting with the previous year at the Café Rubí in Buenos Aires. Their publication of Arturo was partially funded by her father and it is now considered to be an important precursor to the avant-garde Asociación Arte Concreto-Invención and Madí art movements in Argentina. These artists would later split into two separate groups; Quin, Kosice, and Rothfuss would form Madí and Maldonado the Concrete-Invention group, respectively.

Throughout the 1940s, Prati participated in several exhibitions, collaborated with other concrete artists, and taught Concrete art and industrial design in Terezopolis, Rio de Janeiro State, Brazil with Maldonado.

In 1945, Edgar Bayley labeled the Argentine response to the European Concrete art movement invencionismo. This same group of artists that Bayley identified would later become the Asociación Arte Concreto-Invención art movement. In August 1946 Prati was one of the signatories of the Inventionist Manifesto that was published in the first edition of the group's magazine, Art Concreto. In line with the abstract, non-figurative leanings of the Concrete-Inventionists, Prati's paintings during this period were highly abstract, geometric, and colorful. Indeed, a key influence on her aesthetic style was the minimalist Piet Mondrian. She also experimented with shaped canvases. In 1950 she participated in the Arte Concreto exhibition at the Instituto De Arte Moderno in Buenos Aires.

In 1952, Prati traveled to Europe. During this time she and Maldonado befriended the Swiss artist Max Bill, who was an early practitioner of European Concrete art. Max Bill believed that the Argentine artists were creating "true" concrete art and he was especially impressed with Prati's artwork, likely her Composición serial (Serial Composition, 1948).

In 1952 Prati exhibited with the group in an exhibition entitled Grupo de Artistas Modernos de la Argentina that Pellegrini organized at the Viau Galería de Arte in Buenos Aires.

Much of Prati's work reflects the investigations of not just the AACI, but other concrete artists around the world including Max Bill and Georges Vanterlongoo. One major topic of discussion was the relationship between the background and the figure of a surface or artwork. Their two ideas for how to approach this was one, to make the background seem to vibrate as much as possible, or two, to blend the figure and the background. The first, more popular among the artists, is shown in three of Prati's works, Concret A4 (1948), Composición serial (Serial Composition, 1948), Sin título (Untitled, ca.1948) [cat. 102] and Vibración al infinito (Endless Vibration, 1953). While each of these works uses repetition and the grouping of one geometric shape, the use of color creates instability and tension between the figure and the background. This technique was reflective of Prati's studies in Gestalt Throy, Ostwald's Theory, and color theory and helped her to achieve her goal of straining our scheme of visual perception.

After her divorce with Maldonado in the mid-1950s, Prati abandoned painting in favor of graphic design, jewelry and textiles.

In 1963, Prati not only took part in but also designed the exhibition poster for 20 Años de Arte Concreto (or "20 Years of Concrete Art") at the Buenos Aires Museum of Modern Art.

In 1970, Prati co-founded the magazine Artinf with the artists Germaine Derbecq, Silvia de Ambrosini, and Odile Baron Supervielle.

== Public collections ==
Prati's work can be found in a number of public collections, including:

- Museum of Modern Art
- Cisneros Fontanal Art Foundation (CIFO)
- MALBA

== Artwork ==
Artwork

Untitled, 1944

Concreto, 1945

Untitled, 1945

Composición Serial, 1948

Concret A4, 1948

Concrete No.2-B, 1948

Variaciones Sobre Distinto Fondo, 1949

Estructura Vibracional Desde un Círculo, Serie B, 1951

Vibración al Infinito, 1953

Homenaje a Max Bill o Guatemala, 1954-1955

== Exhibitions ==
1957 – "Pintores no-figurativos (elogio del pequeño formato)", Sociedad Hebraica, Buenos Aires, 1 to 19 August.

1959 – "Primera exposición internacional de pintura de Punta del Este, Argentina, Brasil, Uruguay", Museo de Arte Moderno, Punta del Este, Uruguay.

1963 – "Del Arte Concreto a la nueva tendencia, Argentina 1944 – 1963", Museo de Arte Moderno, Buenos Aires.

1968 – "Arte Concreto-Invención, Sociedad Hebraica, Buenos Aires. 2nd Buffalo Festival of the Arts Today, Plus Times Minus: Today’s Half Century", Albright-Knox Gallery, Buffalo, New York, 3 March to 14 April.

1972 – "Homenaje a Mondrian", Galería Lirolay, Buenos Aires.

1976 – "Homenaje a la vanguardia del 40", Galería Arte Nuevo, Buenos Aires.

1980 – "Vanguardias de la década del 40, Arte Concreto – Invención, Arte Madi, Perceptismo", Museo Sivori, Buenos Aires, curated by Nelly Perazzo.

1991 – "Arte Concreto-Invención-Arte Madi, Argentinien 1945-1960", Haus für Konstruktive und Konkrete Kunst, Zürich, April to July.

1992 – "Latin American Artists of the Twentieth Century", The Museum of Modern Art, New York.

1994 – "Art from Argentina 1920 1994", Museum of Modern Art, Oxford, England.

1995 – "A cincuenta años de la Asociación Arte Concreto-Invención", Instituto Cultural Iberoamericano, Buenos Aires, July.

1996 – "El Espíritu de la Colmena", Centro Cultural Recoleta, Buenos Aires.

2001 – "Abstract Art from the Rio de la Plata, Buenos Aires, and Montevideo, 1933 – 1953", The Americas Society, New York, 11 September to 9 December.

2002 – 2003 – "Arte Astratta Argentina", Galleria d’Arte Moderna e Contemporanea, Bergamo, Italy, December to March 2003.

2004 – "Utopía de la forma. Espinosa, Girola, Hlito, Iommi, Lozza, Maldonado, Mele, Prati", Galería Del Infinito, Buenos Aires, inauguración 20 April.
