= Gyula Kosice =

Czechoslovak-born Argentine artist and poet

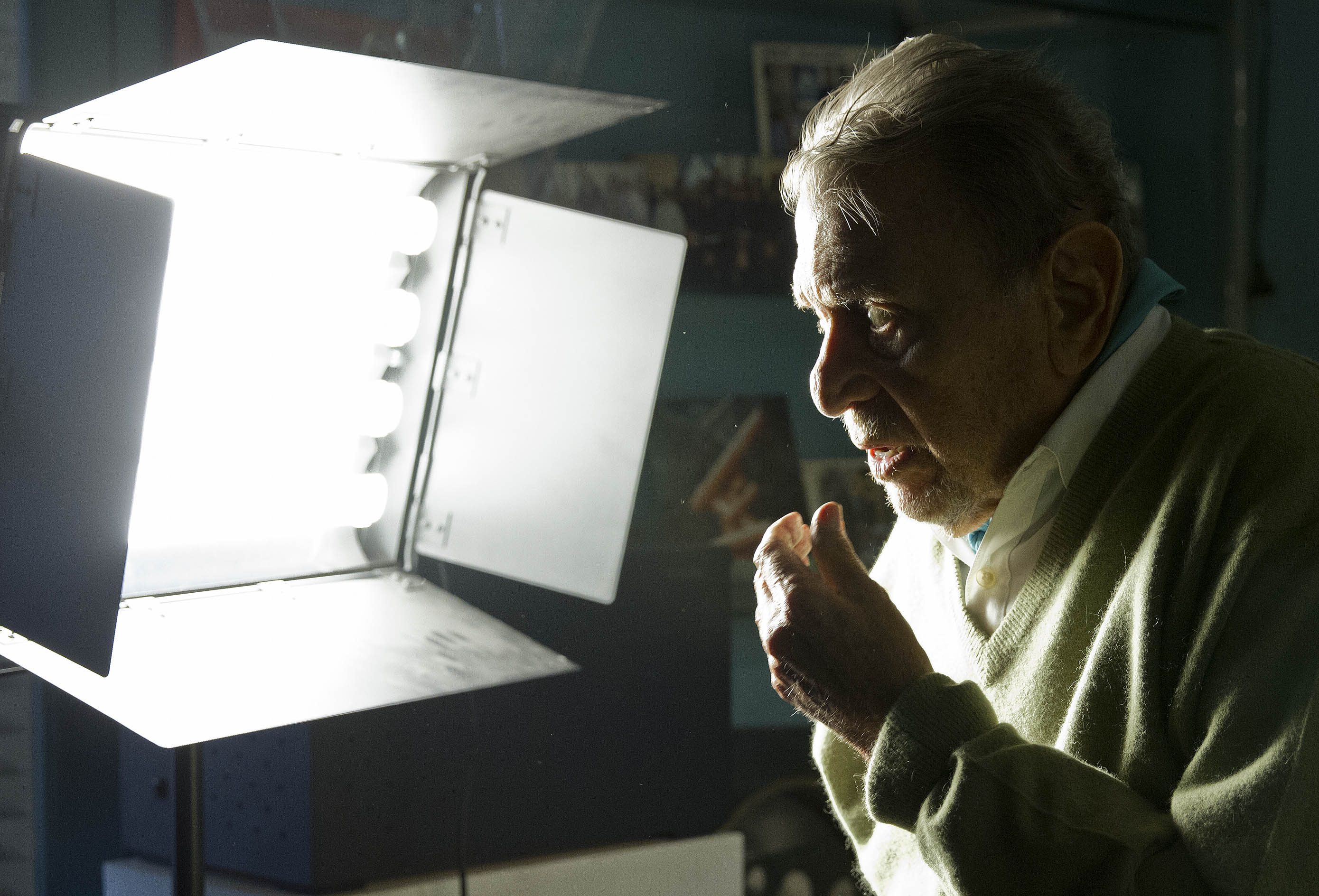
- Kosice in 2015
- Born: Ferdinand Fallik; 26 April 1924; Košice, Czechoslovakia
- Died: 25 May 2016 (aged 92); Buenos Aires, Argentina
- Notable work: Royi, Ciudad Hidroespacial
- Movement: Concrete Art, Kinetic Art

Gyula Kosice (Hungarian: Falk Gyula; 26 April 1924 – 25 May 2016), born as Ferdinand Fallik, was a Czechoslovak-born and naturalized Argentine sculptor, plastic artist, theorist, and poet. He played a pivotal role in defining the concrete and non-figurative art movements in Argentina and was one of the precursors of kinetic, luminal, and hydrokinetic avant-garde art. His work was revolutionary in that it used, for the first time in international art scene, water and neon gas as part of the artwork.

He created monumental sculptures, hydrospatial walks, hydrowalls, etc. Kosice is also known for his involvement in founding the Association Arte Concreteo – Invacion (AACI) and Grupo Madí. He made more than 40 personal and 500 collective exhibitions all over the world.

== Personal life ==
Ferdinand Fallik, who later adopted the stage name Gyula Kosice as a tribute to his hometown, was born into an ethnic Hungarian family in Košice, Czechoslovakia on 26 April 1924. He lived there with his parents and two brothers until he was 4 years, at which time his family emigrated to Argentina aboard the Royal Mail Lines (RMS) Alcanatara steamship in 1928.

In 1932, at the age of 8, Kosice was orphaned and he and his two brothers were taken in by an immigrant companion of his father. As a child and a young adult, Kosice was an avid reader and frequently visited popular libraries where he discovered the inventions of Leonardo da Vinci. He also began to write poetry, which he continued doing for the rest of his life.

Kosice's artistic career began in the 1940s as he started to collaborate and work alongside other ambitious artists who shared similar ideas about what art should be. He was involved in the formation of Asociación Arte Concreto-Invención (AACI) and Grupo Madí. For the remainder of his life, he remained a prominent figure in Arte Madí, continuing to contribute to magazine publications. He continued to create Madí paintings and sculptures, experimenting with new materials including stainless steel, aluminum, bronze, and plexiglass. One of his most notable works, Hydrospatial City, was created to propose an antigravity solution to Earth's large and growing human population and is the subject of many of his publications. Kosice continued to participate in exhibitions and in the creation of monumental works all around the world.

In 1945, he met his wife and life-long companion Diyi Laãn. Laãn also was an artist and poet of the Arte Madí group but later gave up her own career to support Kosice and his artistic career

In 2005, he turned is workshop in Buenos Aires into a museum.

Kosice died in Buenos Aires, Argentina on 25 May 2016.

== Early career – 1940s ==
In the early 1940s, Kosice started his first non-figurative drawings, paintings, and sculptures. He was inspired by Leonardo da Vinici's to use science and invention to think to the future rather than focusing only on the present. He also wrote texts and poems about interdisciplinary art at this time.

Gyula Kosice's art career really started in 1944. In the early 1940s Kosice started going to the Buenos Aires cafes where he met other poets and art enthusiasts. He debated poetry with Alberto Hidalgo and was introduced to Constructivism, the Bauhaus style, and European avant-garde art. It was there that he met the other concrete artists with whom he would later publish the Arturo magazine and form the AACI. The focus in his early art career was about concrete, nonobjective art and how it could radically change society for the better. He worked alongside many other Argentine artists who all shared the same idea that art should reference only itself and should only be made for its own sake. In 1944, he published the journal Arturo with Carmelo Arden Quin, Rhod Rothfuss, Joaquín Torres-García, Tomás Maldonado, and Lidy Prati. The journal had poems, artworks, and articles containing the artists' responses to constructivist art. That same year, he went with this group of artists to host Art concret invention and El movimiento de arte concreto-invención, a couple of private exhibitions on constructivist art in private homes. One of these private exhibitions was in the home of photographer Grete Stern.

In 1945, the same group of artists split into two separate groups in Buenos Aires. The first was known as the Asociación Arte Concreto-Invención, which was led by Tomás Maldonado, and consisted of Manuel Espinosa, Lidy Prati, Enio Iommi, Alfredo Hilto and Raúl Lozza along with four of his brothers. The other group was called Grupo Madí, which was founded by Kosice alongside Quin, Ruthfuss and Martín Blaszco. Grupo Madí was unique from AACI in that they wanted to include sculpture, design motifs, and architecture. This gave Kosice a venue to experiment with plastics, water, and neon in his works.

The meaning of the group has been called into question many times, but Kosice claimed that the word "Madí" was made-up by the group and carried no meaning whatsoever. The main concern of this group was to reach out beyond the art community and to encourage people in all creative disciplines (such as dancers, architects, and actors) to carry the "Madí spirit". They did this by including articles in their published journals on poems written by others, general art theories, reports on musical events, photos of other exhibitions, and a "Madí Dictionary".

Over the next few years, Kosice hosted many international exhibitions with this group of artists. In the Madí Manifesto that Kosice wrote, alongside the other group members, Kosice explained that Madí art is the "absolute value" of the presence and theme of the work, and that it was only to be expressed by nothing more than the unique formal characteristics of the creative discipline that it was made in. His examples were painting with color on a two-dimensional surface, or creating a sculpture that has "movement" but not adding or changing color.

Several of Kosice's early works embodied the very principles that helped define the AACI and Madí's artistic goals. Royï (1944): Kosice created this piece during the time of the Arturo art group's first exhibitions in 1944. One of the first artworks to depend on the viewer's participation, Kosice created this wooden structure using hinges and wing nuts. The viewer is encouraged to move parts of the structure to position it as they want to, making this piece one of the first to rely on viewer participation. This artwork was made under the same ideas that define the Kinetic Art movement of the 1960s. Another artwork call Una gota de aqua acunada a todad velocité (1948) was the first artwork to incorporate water and contains a small, motored device that moves an acrylic box filled with water and air.

In 1947, Kosice hosted his first personal exhibition of Madí Art at the Bohemien Club in Galerías Pacífico (Buenos Aires, Argentina), which was the first totally non-figurative exhibition in Latin-America.

In 1948, he was involved in a Madí exhibition at Réalités Nouvelles, Paris. He was invited by Del Morle and the governing board. He received the collaboration of the France Cultural Attach in Buenos Aires, M. Weibel Reichard.

In the late 1940s, Kosice was the first to use neon lighting in his artwork, using them to create non-representational patterns in what he called "Hydrokinetism".

== Late career and death (1950s–2016) ==
In the late 1950s, Gyula Kosice started to create his motorized "hydrokinetic" sculptures that incorporated the use of neon light, plexiglas, aluminum, and water. These sculptures were Kosice's experimentations with the perception of color, its motion, and how it can make the viewer feel visually unstable. The use of constantly shifting water combined with moving light was what created the feeling of instability as these elements were always in perpetual motion. These "hydrokinetic" sculptures had their roots in the concrete art movement, however they truly fit and thrived in the kinetic art movement. These artworks were exhibited in 1958 at the Galeria Densie René in Paris.

In 1965, Kosice made Columnas Hidroluz. Translated as "Hydrolight Columns", this work was made of plastic hemispherical containers that held cycling water inside. This work focused on the effects of light in shifting water on the viewer. As the water and air bubbles constantly moved, this work (and others like it) appeared to "defy the laws of gravity", which made the viewer feel unstable.

In the 1970s, Kosice started the Ciudad Hidroespacial project that proposed creating a classless society by building an entirely new city. For many years, he worked on this project. Kosice started this large and radical project out of his interest for space travel. He felt that contemporary architecture was centered around functionality for the powerful people in society more than anything else, and that this focus made the oppression of the lower class in Argentina much worse. He also wanted to model a futuristic urban habitat, which he envisioned spatial architecture that flowed without boundaries like water. Ciudad Hidroespacial consisted of many plexiglass models for architects to create a new large, self-sustaining cosmic city. It was also made of plastic, metal, and many other materials that were collaged onto pictures of cloudy skies.

Kosice was granted the Trajectory in Plastics Arts award by the Fondo Nacional de las Artes (National Arts Fund) in 1994. Also was granted the Platinum Konex Award in 1982, the Konex Merit Diploma in 2002, and the Konex Special Mention in 2012 (posthumous).

Kosice died in 2016 at 92 years of age.

== Legacy ==
Throughout his lifetime, Gyula Kosice hosted more than 40 personal exhibitions and participated in 500 collective exhibitions all over the world.

He is remembered for his innovative contributions to the kinetic art movement in Argentina. He was the first to use neon light and gas, creating nonrepresentational patterns in his sculptures. He created many monumental sculptures, hydrospatial walks, and hydrowalls using these elements.

In 2025, the Pérez Art Museum Miami, Florida, is showcasing Gyula Kosice: Intergalactic, a solo presentation celebrating the artist's 100th birthday. The exhibition is organized the Museo de Arte Latinoamericano de Buenos Aires in collaboration with the Museum of Fine Arts, Houston.

== Artwork ==
- Röyi, 1944
- Esculatra Articulada, 1946
- Estructura Lumínica Madí 6, 1946
- Una Gota de Agua Acundada a Toda Velocidad, 1948
- Talla Directa "C", 1953
- Círculos Lumínicos y Llíea de Agua Móvil, 1968
- Aerolite, 1970
- Viviendas Hidroespaciales en la Constelación de Yael, 1970
- Constelaciones No.1 – No.6, 1970–1972
- Gota de Agua Móvil, 1980
- Cilindro Luminoso y Esfera, 1989
- Indermitencia Lumínica, 2010

== Monuments ==
- Tiempo Para Hidroespaciar, Caracas, Venezuela. 1968
- Faro de la cultura, Centenary of the founding of La Plata, Argentina. 1982
- El Vuelo de la Paloma, La Paloma, Uruguay. 1985
- Homenaje a la Democracia, City of Buenos Aires, Argentina. 2000
- Corazón Planetario, Favaloro Foundation, City of Buenos Aires, Argentina. 2000
- Tríada – Fuente del Milenio, Junín, province of Buenos Aires, Argentina. 2000
- Röyi, Museum of the Park, Portofino, Italy. 2009
- Röyi, Museum of Underwater Art (MUMART), Golfo Aranci, Sardinia, Italy. 2010
- Júblio, Kunsthalle, Košice, Slovakia. 2014

== Small list of exhibitions ==
1947

- Galerías Pacífico, Buenos Aires. (First all non figurative, abstract and kinetic exhibition in Latin America).

1953

- Galería Bonino, Buenos Aires.

1960

- Kosice, Galerie Denise René, Paris.
- Exhibition of spatial constructions and first hydraulic sculpture, Drian Gallery, London.

1963

- Galerie L'Oeil, Paris.

1964

- Galerie La Hune, Paris.

1965

- Terry Dintenfass Gallery, New York.

1966

- Galería de Arte Moderno, Córdoba, Argentina.

1967

- Galería Bonino, Buenos Aires.
- Kosice, Sculpture: water, light, movement. Galería Bonino, New York.

1968

- "100 obras de Kosice, un precursor", Centro de Artes Visuales, Instituto Torcuato Di Tella, Buenos Aires.
- Kosice, Galería Bonino, Buenos Aires.
- 150 meters of rain, Florida street, Buenos Aires.

1969

- Bijoux et sculptures d'eau, Galerie Lacloche, Paris.

1970

- Galería Estudio Actual, Caracas, Venezuela.

1971

- "La Ciudad Hidroespacial", Galería Bonino, Buenos Aires.

1972

- Galería de Arte del Banco Continental, Lima, Peru.
- G.K., Foyer del Teatro Municipal General San Martín, Buenos Aires.
- Exhibition organized by Museo de Arte Moderno de Buenos Aires.

1973

- Luis Arango Library, Bogotá, Colombia.

1974

- Kosice, Israel Museum, Jerusalem.
- Kosice bijoux hydrospatial, Espace Cardin, Paris.

1975

- La cite' hydrospatial. Espace Cardin, Paris, France.
- Kosice Works, Galería Pozzi, Buenos Aires.

1977

- Exhibition Kosice, aluminum relieves. 1945 – 50. Documents about Madí art. Departamento Cultural Librería de la Ciudad, Galería del Este, Buenos Aires.
- Hydrospatial Exhibition organized by Argentine "Confagua" and the ONU for the "Water World Conference", Mar del Plata, Argentina.

1979

- "Esculturas insólitas, pequeño formato, piezas únicas" Galería Birger, Buenos Aires.
- Hydrokinetic works, Galería Unika, Punta del Este, Uruguay.
- Hydrospatial City, City of Buenos Aires Galileo Galilei planetary.

1982

- Kosice, Hakone Open Air Museum, Tokyo, Japan.

1985

- Kosice's Monumental Works, Centro Cultural de la Ciudad de Buenos Aires.

1991

- Retrospective Exhibition, 1944 – 1990. Museo Nacional de Bellas Artes, Buenos Aires.

1999

- Anticipations, more than 80 works. Centro Cultural Recoleta, Buenos Aires.

2003

- "Homenaje a un creador multifacético. 62 años de trayectoria. Obras Digitales." Centro Cultural Recoleta, Buenos Aires, 2003.

2005

- Little Kosice Room. Latin-American Art Museum, Austin, Texas, United States.
- Museo Provincial de Bellas Artes Rosa Galisteo de Rodríguez – 82nd Annual in Santa Fe, Argentina. Special Guest.

2006

- Madí Walk, at Florida Street (Buenos Aires).
- Tribute to Master Gyula Kosice in Culture and Art, Nation's Senate, Buenos Aires, Argentina.

2007

- Merryl Lynch Arteaméricas, G. Kosice special guest representing Latin America. Miami, United States.

2025

- Gyula Kosice: Intergalactic, Pérez Art Museum Miami, Florida

== Published books ==
- Invención (1945)
- Golsé-se (1952)
- Peso y medida de Alberto Hidalgo (1953)
- Antología madí (1955)
- Geocultura de la Europa de hoy (1959)
- Poème hydraulique (1960)
- Arte hidrocinético (1968)
- La ciudad hidroespacial (1972)
- Arte y arquitectura del agua (1974)
- Arte madí (1982)
- Del Arte Madí a la Ciudad hidroespacial (1983)
- Obra poética (1984)
- Entrevisiones (1985)
- Teoría sobre el arte (1987)
- Kosice (1990)
- Arte y filosofía porvenirista (1996)
- Madigrafías y otros textos (2006)
