= Enio Iommi =

Argentine sculptor

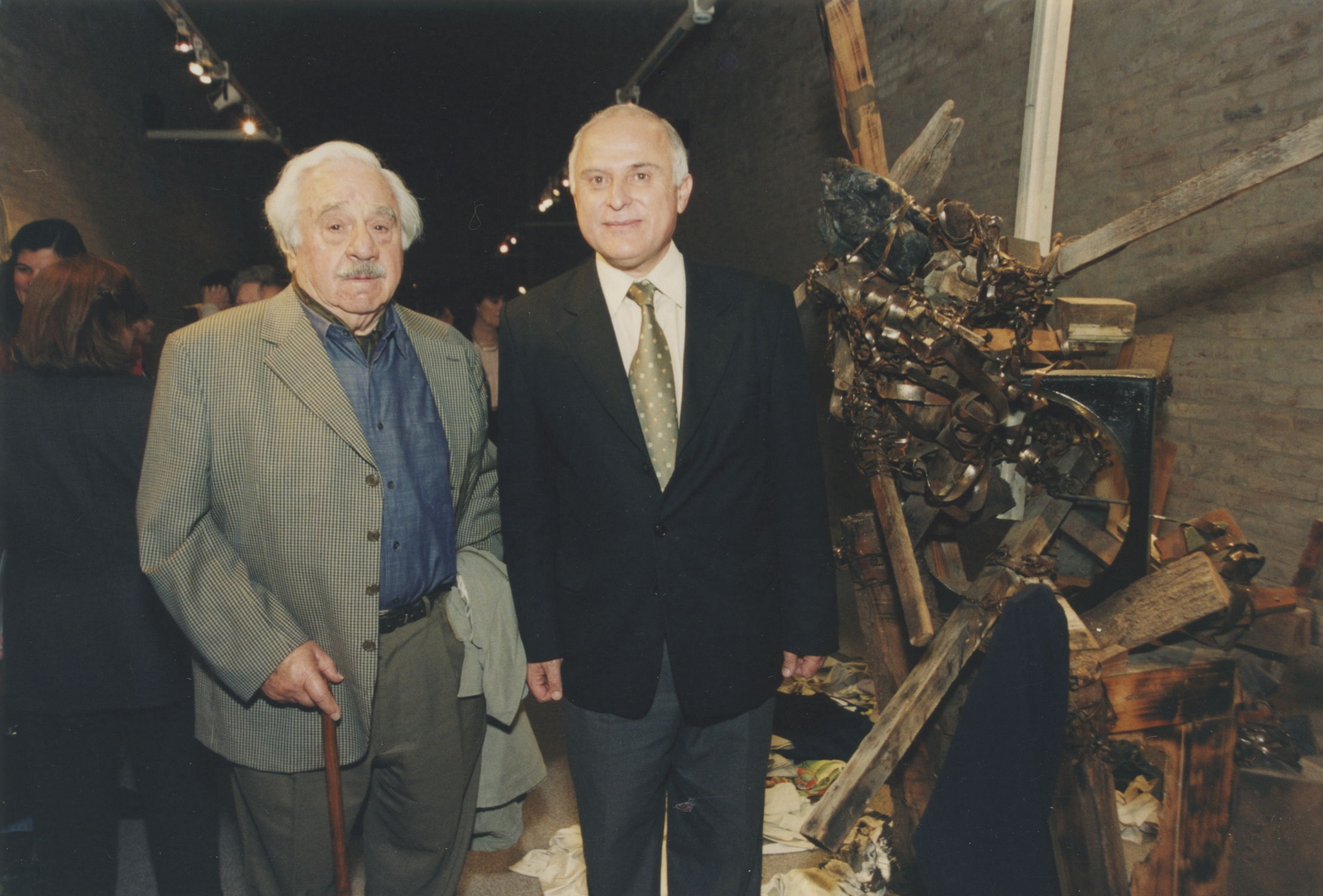
- Born: Enio Francisco Girola Iommi; 20 March 1926; Rosario, Argentina
- Died: 13 May 2013 (aged 87); San Justo, Argentina
- Occupation: Sculptor
- Parent(s): María Iommi; Santiago Girola
- Family: Claudio Girola (brother)

Enio Francisco Girola Iommi (20 March 1926 – 13 May 2013) was an Argentine visual artist who was particularly well known for his work as a concrete sculptor. In 1946 he co-founded the avant-garde Concrete-Invention Art Movement, which was Argentine branch of the larger concrete art movement.

== Biography ==
Enio Girola Iommi was born on March 20, 1926, in Rosario to the Italian sculptor Santiago Girola and the also Italian modiste María Iommi (the trade of a fashion designer for nowadays standards). His elder brother, Claudio Girola, was born in 1923 and Nidia, his sister, in 1929. Claudio and Enio grew up around their father's workshop and learned the craft of sculpture while they submerged themselves into an environment soaking in artistic culture. In 1939, as a consequence of the 30s’ economic crisis, the Girolas moved to Buenos Aires. Still in his teens, Enio is introduced by his brother Claudio and his uncle Godofredo Iommi (the elder brother of their mother) to a group of young artists with whom he began to frequent and exchanged ideas about avant-garde art. At the beginning of the 40s, these young poets and painters rebelled against traditional Figurativism –the mainstream current in Argentina. Together they formed a spearhead ready to revamp it. Claudio Girola, Alfredo Hlito, Tomás Maldonado, Edgar Bayley, Gyula Kosice, Rhod Rothfuss, Arde Quin and others got together at Rubí bar, in front of Miserere Square. They were interested in the information, available albeit scarce in the city, about the Russian Constructivism and the Dutch De Stijl.

Two groups of artists emerged from those gatherings that led the way across the path of Modern Art in Argentina: Concrete-Invention Art Association (in Spanish, Asociación Arte Concreto Invención) and Madí Arts (Arte Madí). Both rejected figuration and representation, to which they opposed the invention. In other words, the creation in a pure sense. The ultimate abstraction. A visual morphology not addressing anything in particular. These ideas were later developed in the Arturo magazine, whose single issue appeared in 1944. Given Enio's young age, he is first a spectator, but quickly became an active member of the Concrete-Invention group, giving birth to his first painting over a linoleum sheet that same year. The following year, the artist took his first step into sculpture with Opposite Directions, a work of great formal maturity despite being a debut piece. The members of the Concrete-Invention Art Association showcased their first public exhibition in the Peuser art salon, located in Florida Street. Among the participants were Claudio Girola, Tomás Maldonado, the Lozza brothers, Alberto Molemberg, Primaldo Mónaco, Nuñez, Liddi Prati, Jorge Souza and Enio, who took his mother's last name, Iommi, as his alias to distinguish himself from his brother. The traditional art circles and part of the press replied negatively to the cutting-edge proposal of the Geometric art. Without giving up, the members of the association met every Saturday to discuss new concepts. Enio Iommi drew visual sustenance from artists such as Max Bill and Georges Vantorgerloo. It seems that the sculpture Torn Circles is opposing to the theoretical bases of the Constructivism and, as the titles announces, it foreshadows one trait of his work: to sever from models that begin to suffocate his desire to explore new horizons. They continued presenting group expositions until 1950, when the association disbanded. Due to the initiative of the critic Aldo Pellegrini, another crew was formed under the name of Modern Artists of Argentina (in Spanish, Artistas Modernos de la Argentina), which flocked together independent Abstract and Concrete Art sculptors and painters. Maldonado, Hlito, Iommi, Sarah Grilo, Fernandez Muro, Ocampo, Aebi and Claudio Girola staged collective shows in Viau and Krayd galleries. Also, in the Museum of Modern Art of Rio de Janeiro, where they applied pioneering museological criteria.

In 1953, Enio Iommi met Susana Schneider, a young polyglot Argentine woman of French-Swiss descent, to whom he married three years later and who played a decisive role in the development of his career as an artist. That same year, he was invited to work on a sculpture for what is now known as Casa Curuchet, designed by the architect Le Corbusier. The Modern Artists chose separate individual ways in 1955 and abandoned their activities as a group. Claudio Girola and Godofredo Iommi migrated to Chile. After his wedding, Enio moved his workshop to Morón district for two years before settling permanently in El Palomar. In this period, he initiated collaboration with the Austrian architect Herman Loos, for whom he designed decorative items –an activity that enabled him to secure his livelihood whereas he continued to produce his personal work, which took a new direction. Without discarding Geometry, the new sculptures based on simple shapes as circles, squares, triangles and ellipses were more expressive. Enio Iommi began to feel choked with the Concrete art principles. On metal surfaces, he performed cuts, that deconstructed the initial plane in order to form new virtual volumes and create the space. This period, that the art critic López Anaya refers as “Baroque” stretched out for 25 years, during which Enio Iommi asserted his identity as a Modern sculptor. 1957 was a year marked by the arrival of his daughter Claudia, followed by his son Rafael in 1964. Neither the former, an anthropologist, nor the latter, an astronomer, followed the steps of their father (albeit Rafael had dabbled in painting for a certain time), but they inherited a lifelong passion for the chosen disciplines.

In 1958, Enio Iommi unveiled his first solo art show in the Pizarro gallery. It consisted of a retrospective exhibition where works of his first period were featured as well as his ongoing production, which gained him recognition in the artistic scene. In the decade of the 60, the exhibits succeeded each other, enhancing his prestige. In 1968, due to a grant received from the Italian embassy in Argentina, he was able to visit Italy, France, London and New York. The trip constituted a face-to-face contact with the work of the greatest past and contemporary authors. By the end of the 60s, the invitations abroad multiplied: the Nurëmberg Biennale, Kuntshalle Basel, Middelheim Open Air Museum for Sculpture, Aele Gallery (Madrid), Maison Milot (Quebec City),Ottawa City Hall, Caracas Galería Arte Contacto, Tokyo Modern Art Museum, Osaka National Museum of Art, Hakone Open Air Museum, Museum of Contemporary Sculpture (Tokyo), galleries in Havana and Santo Domingo, Hayward Gallery, El Palacio de Velázquez, Art Basel, Rachel Adler Fine Art Gallery (New York), Galerie Michael (Darmstadt), FIAC, Monterrey Museum of Art, Bronx Museum of the Arts, Kuntshalle Cologne, and so on. 1977 will bear witness of the new turn in Enio Iommi's work, who was in urgent need of venturing upon new creative pursuits.

‘It is a nuisance for me to keep doing what I’m familiar with, when I feel confident is when I doubt the most. I like researching.’ (Enio Iommi).

In addition, the eye-catching sculptures he had been collecting until then didn't fit in the political context imposed by the coup d’état of the previous year. He preferred to assemble rustic materials spotted in the street or in similar contexts. Splintered wood and barbed wires alluded to the dictatorship and the deprivation of freedom. The Julia Lublin Gallery housed the exhibition “Farewell to an Era”, whose most prominent work: Acrylic Rectangle and Trash Presented as a Glossy Surface that Conceals a Chaotic Inside was a hint of the forthcoming decades. The expositions “Something Happened to the Cube” (1979) and “Wastage” (1981) incorporated cobblestone as their main material and reinforced the presence of barbed wire. Stones, sheet metal, marble and wooden crates appeared stitched in an unconventional way and affected by the passage of time. His pieces The Stone Guest and His Little Dog (1984) and Our Daily Bread is Getting Harder Everyday (1987) carried on the same leitmotiv referring to the historical phase. In the decade of the 90, he began to plan educational activities that would extend to the end of his days. First, as workshops conducted on the Sivori Museum and later on, in the Cromos Art Institute –an institution in which he took part as a founding member. By 2007, he gave private group lessons at a workshop situated in Piedras street, San Telmo. In 1999, he promoted the creation of the collective X. The ‘x’ symbolized the crossroads and meeting places between young artists born in the 60s who came from different backgrounds: Ana Gallardo, Pablo Siquier, Ernesto Ballesteros, Jorge Macchi, Carolina Antoniadis, Marita Causa, Danilo Danziger, Andrea Racciatti, Gladis Néstor, Enrique Jezik, Gustavo Figueroa, Juan Papparella and the filmmaker Martin Pels. Many of them have accomplished remarkable careers later on. It is likely that the series of works that Iommi developed in 1997 were the seeds of the new clues that the artist was going to explore in the 2000s. The series consisted on kitchen utensils such as coffee pots, kettles or pans that were disintegrated by means of cutting them, bringing forth new spatial forms. The series was presented by the Ruth Benzacar Gallery. To the long list of sculptures sited on public places–Constructive Spaces (1971) at the garden of the Fine Art Museum of Buenos Aires, Spatial Tension (1982) in Punta del Este, Majamoa (1985) at the Baconao square in Havana; Construction (1987) in the Shikoku island, Japan; Planes within the Plane (1988), Porto Alegre, etc. – is added in 1998 the piece 26 ft Elevation placed in the Buriti Palace, the seat of government in the federal district of Brasilia.

On My Utopies vs the Reality, the last show at the end of the century, Iommi affirmed his criticism about the excess of industrialization and the consumerism typical of the modern lifestyle. He accomplished this through the assembly of kitsch objects, low-quality plastic, china cups, artificial fruit, toys, brushes and others. The show was an introduction to what is known as the fourth period of the artist, in which he is devoted to convey new meanings through the composition of objects, whose artistic value was previously nonexistent. Once more, the materials were found and obtained from dollar stores.

"Whenever I found a material that is appealing to me, I look for it and save it at home for some time. After a while, I employ the material because I’ve already pondered on it. I envisage how the material appears on my mind and how my mind adapts to the material. I strive towards what I want to do. If an image appears so be it. If nothing shows up, then off to trash. Beware! Because trash is also good! "

The first decade of the century and the last one of the artist is punctuated by sporadic expositions in which Iommi focused on specific ideas. Such is the case of “A Tribute to the Cambalache Tango” in the Ruth Benzacar gallery (2002), “The Human Kitchen” (Infinito Gallery, 2002); “My New Realities” (Infinito Gallery, 2007) and “The Wonders of the World” (Klemm Foundation, 2012). All of them alternated with major retrospective exhibitions: the anthology exposition entitled “Iommi”at the Cronopios room in the Recoleta Cultural Center, where 43 sculptures produced between 1945 and 2000 were displayed. At the Parque España Cultural Center in Rosario, he presented “From the Space in Tension to the Object in Situation. 1945-2002” in 2003. In 2005, it took place the exhibit “Enio Iommi, 1946-2005. From Utopia to Dystopia” at the Museum of the Tres de Febrero University (MUNTREF for its Spanish acronym). The last retrospective show called “The Edge of Space 1945-2010” presented by himself is hosted by Recoleta Cultural Center in 2010 and spanned his entire work. During this last period, Iommi also participated in a number of collective exhibitions. In 2009, the legislature of the city of Buenos Aires awarded him as a Distinguished Citizen.

Shortly after the show at the Recoleta Cultural Center, Iommi had to undergo a delicate surgical procedure, after which his health became fragile. Nonetheless, his creative energy encouraged him to produce more sculptures, built from the objects he collected. But this time restricted to the perimeter of his home. Soda pop bottles, drug boxes, sushi sticks and items that created a new and different series from his previous works when combined together. Adding to this are the scores of drawings, paintings and collages.

Enio Iommi died on May 13, 2013.

== Public collections ==
Iommi's works can be found in a number of public institutions, including:

- [Official internet site]
- MALBA
- Museo Nacional de Bellas Artes (Buenos Aires)
