= Madí =

Argentinian art group and art movement

Madí (or MADI; also known as Grupo Madí or Arte Madí) is an international abstract (or concrete) art movement initiated in Buenos Aires in 1946 by the Hungarian-Argentinian artist and poet Gyula Kosice, and the Uruguayans Carmelo Arden Quin and Rhod Rothfuss.

The movement focuses on creating concrete art (i.e., non-representational geometric abstraction) and encompasses all branches of art (the plastic and pictorial arts, music, literature, theater, architecture, dance, etc.). The artists in the Madí movement consider the concrete, physical reality of the art medium and play with the traditional conventions of Western art (for instance, by creating works on irregularly-shaped canvases). Artwork of Madí movement appeared in eight issues of its magazine, Arte Madí Universal, published between 1947 and 1954.

== Historical Context ==
The Grupo Madí was one of two prominent groups of artists pursuing abstract art in Argentina. The other was Arte Concreto-Invencíon, or AACI, founded in 1945. The Madí art movement formed as a reaction to the AACI, whose art was perceived by the Madí group as being too strict in their method of creating concrete art, resulting in a lack of expression in their artworks.

Operating under the rule of Colonel Perón, whose time in power was characterized by a volatile political climate, the Madí artists used their art to make statements with social and political implications. One of the most overt criticisms made by the Madí movement criticized cultural authorities in the Arte Madí Universal magazine, commenting "[t]he last submission to the Venice Biennial has signified for Argentina a blunt negation of the new [artistic] values. We invite competent authorities to stop and compare the true current of contemporary plastic arts with the submissions that today put us [our country] half a century behind", which vaguely attack the aesthetic choices of certain cultural officers under Perón. According to Pérez-Barreiro, Madí and Concrete art (referring to the Asociación Arte Concreto-Invención (AACI)) are the artistic parallel(s) of the political phenomenon of Peronism. These artists were also seen as combining modern art with Communist ideology. Some scholars, including Barreiro, saw the government was an outspoken critic against concrete art as a whole, whereas others such as Andrea Giunta assert that the Madí and Concrete groups were not victimized under Perón's regime; rather, they "coexisted on its margins".

The political regime of Perón made use of both linguistic and visual images for propaganda purposes. This is seen in his use of an image, "the shirtless workers" (los descamisados), as an alternative to the concept of the working class. This image had strong connections and connotations with the male worker, shirtless and, unrealistically, without much affliction. In a speech given 17 October 1946 at Plaza de Mayo, Perón addressed the workers in speeches as "mis queridos descamisados" (my loving shirtless workers). At this speech, he declared 17 October the "Day of the Shirtless Workers" and stated "I don’t want to govern over men but over their hearts, because mine beats in unison with the heart of each shirtless worker, which I interpret and love above all things". The use of representations to create propaganda opened up a clear target for the Madí artists to oppose.

== Origin of the name ==
Gyula Kosice, who also operated under the pseudonym Raymundo Rasas Pèt, has explained that the name for the movement is derived from the Republican motto in the Spanish Civil War, "Madrí, Madrí, no pasarán" ("Madrid, Madrid, they will not make it in", i.e., the Francoist forces will not invade Madrid). The name is most typically understood as an acronym for Movimiento, Abstracción, Dimensión, Invención (Movement, Abstraction, Dimension, Invention). It could be an acronym for Movimento de Arte De Invención (because the group was against static arts) or Marxisme/Matérialisme Dialectique, but it could also be a nonsense word.

== Characteristics ==
A Madí work is non-figurative and non-representational; it has a cut-out or irregularly-shaped form, which takes away the viewer's perception of spatial depth that a rectangular frame provides; its colors are flat and sharply defined; it is often three-dimensional and sometimes articulated and/or mechanical; and it is playful in spirit. Madí artists were concerned with creating artworks that were autonomous with functions that naturally transcend the physical features that constitute the work. Introducing elements of transformation and ambiguity were techniques commonly employed by these artists to avoid representation as well as avoid the fixity of representations. In painted works, some artists would intentionally lower the legibility of the design.

The incorporation of unusual materials into artworks is seen throughout the art movement; this includes Plexiglas, fluorescent tubes, neon lights, water, metal, and other materials. An example of this is seen in Kosice's first hydraulic piece, La arquitectura del agua: Hidro-escultura (The Architecture of Water: Hydro-Sculpture), which utilized light and water interaction.

Madí artists sought to combat representational forms because this art reflected and perpetuated class-based social organizations. They believed that representational images "forced others to relate to concepts, connotations, and feelings which were superfluous to the object itself... which enticed individuals into supporting class-based organizations". The Concrete art they produced was meant to have a reality that was self-contained. In other words, the reality of the art ended in the object. In the minds of the Madí artists, "Concrete art was worthy as a contribution to social liberation" because it helped its audience grasp true reality while standing against the concepts, connotations and feelings associated with art. To state this differently, exposing people to what is actually reality allows people to eventually confront myths perpetuated by the bourgeois that has suppressed revolution.

Madí is perhaps the sole remaining art movement which can boast of a half-century of uninterrupted activity since its creation in Buenos Aires in 1946. Today, the MADI movement has over 60 members – painters, sculptors, architects and poets – working in France, Italy, Belgium, Spain, Hungary, Japan, Argentina and the United States. One prominent figure behind this fifty years of artistic creation is Carmelo Arden Quin.

== The Madí Manifesto ==
The Madí Manifesto was created to defend the importance of invention in the light of limitations imposed on concrete art by the excessive rationalism of European concrete art. This strictness of form in concrete art was also demonstrated by the Asociación Arte Concreto-Invención (AACI). The manifesto also called for "the integration of the nonorthogonal framework into representational space".

== Madí Dictionary ==
In written works, artists "disrupted the construction of semantically coherent structures" to avoid attaching meaning to the art and the possibility of representation. The Madí created a dictionary that accomplished the opposite of what a normal dictionary does in that it confused and distorted the meanings of words and made up words. The following excerpt is from the Madí dictionary, which demonstrates a correct grammatical structure that relates ideas that are impossible to interpret meaningfully. This is an example of this incoherent construction which prevents interpretation:

M

Maclode: Upward hill. / Slope to insinuate land.

Meril: Kidnapping of flat centimeters. / Madícional ['Madí-like' or 'of Madí origin'] opposition and resistance.

Miogue: Account of events in which the authors of great answers participated.

Molois: Site where the most varied adjectives are collected. / Fam. Insult.

Musver: About the manner to focus in photography the liveliest glare of a childhood memory. / Fixation.

Macichud: Line of shade that emits a loosening of gray beams.

N

Nandy: Arrangement for new personal cuño.

Nem-Er: Record of instances.

Nigs: Opening that is left so that a cluster of enchanted powder emigrates.

Novoh: Shooter that the riverside authority exercises to learn the coastal ruling

== Selected Artists and Artworks ==
Representatives of the Madí movement, in addition to Kosice, Quin and Rothfuss, include Martín Blaszko, Volf Roitman, Waldo Longo, Juan Bay, Esteban Eitler, Diyi Laañ, Valdo Wellington, and Ladislao Pablo Győri, among others.

=== Gyula Kosice ===
- Röyi, 1944
- Lámpara, 1961
- Ciudad hidroespacial, 2005
- Sobre Relieve, 1950
- Pintura Madi, 1948
- Hidroluz (Lampara de pie), ca. 1975
- Coplanal, 1947
- Parabolica, 1960
- Gota de agua, 1960
- Revolving water, 1964
- Hidroluz [Hydrolight], 1975

=== Rhod Ruthfuss ===
- 3 circulos rojos, 1948

=== Diyi Laañ ===
- "La batalla de Inod", (short story) 1947
- Tiagno, (play script) 1947

=== Others ===
- Tomás Maldonado, Composition, 1951
- Lidy Prati, Concrete Painting 2-B, 1948
- Youri Messen-Jaschin

== Exhibitions ==
- Aug. 1946 – Instituto Francés de Estudios Superiores in Buenos Aires, where the MADI manifesto was read
- Oct. 1945 – Concret invencion (French) Location: House of Dr. Enrique Pichon-Riveiere (leader of Psychoanalytic Societry of Argentina)
- Dec. 1945 – El movimiento de arte concreto-invencion, a multimedia event which became the hallmark of Madí exhibitions. Location: House of Bauhaus- trained photographer Grete Stern
- 1947 – Galerías Pacífico, Buenos Aires
- 1948 – Salon des Réalités Nouvelles in Paris
- 1958 – Art Madí International at the Galerie Denise René
- 1996 - Madí Internacional: 50 Años Después, Centra de Exposiciones y Congresos, Saragossa
- 2010 – Outside the Box: Eleven International MADI Artists, Polk Museum of Art, Florida

== Why MADI? ==
To the question, "Why MADI?" Josee Lapeyrere, who met Arden Quin in 1962 and has since participated with her poem-objects in most of the events organized by the movement, replies: "MADI's goal is to be rigorous, inventive, gay and ludic." By the importance to which they accord spiritual and imaginative games, even the most serious MADI artists can be described as playful. Already in 1795, Schiller focused on "the inborn playful nature of man" as an explanation for his production of art forms. In his essay, "Homo Ludens" ("Ludic Man") (1938), Johan Huizinga observed that, "Play reveals an aspiration to beauty. The terms we use to designate the elements of play are, for the most part, the same as those utilized in the aesthetic realm: beauty, tension, balancing, equilibrium, gradation, contrast, etc. Like art, play engages and delivers. It absorbs. It captivates, or, in other words, it charms. It is full of those two supremely noble qualities which man expresses through rhythm and harmony." The French art critic Dominique Jacquemin also remarks that, "It is possible that Arden Quin's passion for game playing led him to create MADI, the only remaining contemporary art movement which can pride itself in possessing both coherence and a truly international outlook."

== See also ==
- Museum of Geometric and MADI Art
