= Manuel Espinosa (painter) =

Argentine artist

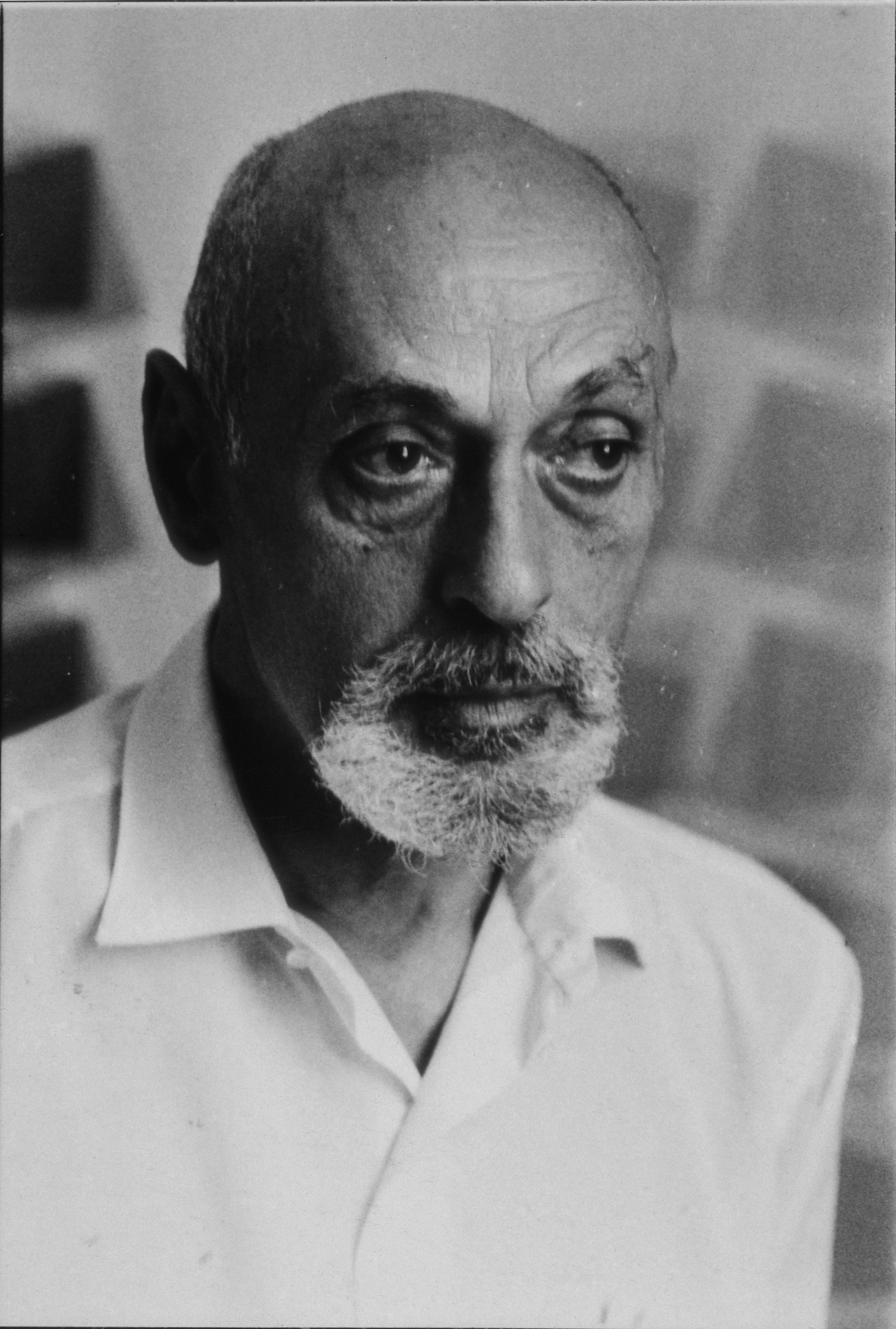
- Born: 1912; Buenos Aires, Argentina
- Died: 2006 (aged 94)
- Education: Escuela Nacional de Artes, Escuela Superior de Bellas Artes
- Known for: Painting, drawing, sculpture
- Notable work: Coleccion Privada
- Movement: Arte Concreto-Invención

Manuel Espinosa (Buenos Aires, 1912 - Buenos Aires, Argentina, 2006) was an Argentine painter. He was a key figure of Argentine geometric abstraction and Concrete Art. After an early surreal-leaning phase, a 1943 encounter with Joaquín Torres-García pushed him toward rigorous non-figuration; in the mid-1940s he co-founded the Asociación Arte Concreto-Invención in Buenos Aires. His mature work explores serial progressions of simple forms (grids of circles/squares, subtle transparencies) to create optical vibration and luminous depth.

== Biography ==
Espinosa graduated from the Escuela Nacional de Artes and finished his studies in the Escuela Superior de Bellas Artes. He is one of the leaders of the geometric art in Argentina. He was a founding member of the asociación de Arte Concreto-Invención which was established in Buenos Aires in 1943.

Averaging the 2nd World War, the group proposed a rupture as an alternative. Said rupture was related to the search for a new visual language corresponding to the exigencies of a new technological, industrial society. The group sustained common goals: the art should be non-figurative art, the painting flat, and the illusions and appearances banished, moving away from traditional painting. They looked for the worth of the painting itself. In 1951 he traveled to Europe and met Vantongerloo in Paris and Vordemberge-Gildewarth in Amsterdam, who guided him in his pursuit.

Upon the dissolution of the group, Espinosa left the common goals but remained faithful to the spirit of non-figuration and produced a painting constructed from geometric elements, characterized by a rigorous system of order and by the perfection of their registers. Clarity, moderation, are attributes of his painting, which with minimal elements arranged serially produce subtle effects of color and space and a dynamic tension that creates an impression of depth. It employs transparencies, juxtapositions superpositions that generate an optical effect of unquestionable interest. He is one of the painters who most enjoys the game aroused by reason and sensitivity, a consequence of his special relationship with music and literature.

== Exhibitions ==
He is a founding member of the group Arte Concreto-Invención. Since 1939 he carried out many individual and collective exhibits, among them:

== Awards ==
- Air France Award – First Saloon Air France of Painting, 1966.
- First Prize – D Category and Special Mention - A & B categories – First Saloon Hisisa of Art Applied to the Textile Industry, 1967.
- Acquisition Award – Saloon of Art Mar del Plata, 1967.
- Mention Award Painting Section– LVI National Saloon of Plastic Arts, 1967
- Medal –Automóvil Club Argentino Award, 1969.
- Rotary Club Award, XVIII National Saloon of Córdoba, 1970.
- Great Acquisition Award –Municipal Saloon of Plastic Arts "Manuel Belgrano", 1971.
- Third Prize – LX National Saloon of Plastic Arts, 1971
- Merit Diploma, Konex Award of Visual Arts – 1982.
- Artistic Career – National Fund of Arts, 1993
- Stamps of Artist – Stamps of Andreani Foundation y ArteBA Foundation, 2001.
- Castagnino Award – Municipal Museum of Fine Arts Juan B. Castagnino, Rosario, 2001.

== Bibliography ==
- Amaral, A. (1993). "Abstract Constructivist Trends in Argentina, Brazil, Venezuela, and Colombia." en Latin American Artists of the Twentieth Century. Museum of Modern Art New York.
- Amaral, A. (1999). "Aventura plástica de hispanoamérica". Fondo de Cultura Económica, Mexico.
- Amaral, A. (1991). "Nueva Historia de la Pintura y la Escultura en la Argentina". Ediciones de Arte Gaglianone, Bs. As.
- Amaral, A. (1992). "Argentina 1910–1960 en Voces de ultramar - Arte en América Latina y Canarias: 1910–1960. Centro Atlántico de Arte Moderno, Madrid.
- Amaral, A. (1958). "La pintura argentina del siglo XX.". Ed. Atlántida, Bs. As.
- Geometrías - Abstracción geométrica latinoamericana en la Colección Cisneros, Bs. As. MALBA Colección Constantini. 2003.
- Gesualdo, V. (1969). Enciclopedia del arte en América, Bs. As. Bibliográfica Omeba.
- Giunta, A. (2000). "Crónicas de posguerra: Lucio Fontana en Bs. As.", en Lucio Fontana. Obras Maestras de la Colección Lucio Fontana de Milán. Fundación Proa, Bs. As.
- Gradowczky, Perazzo, M., N. (2001). Abstract art from Río de la Plata. Bs. As. and Montevideo 1933/55. N.Y. The American Society.
- Lafleur, H. (1962). Las revistas literarias argentinas 1893–1960, Bs. As. Ediciones Culturales Argentinas.
- López Anaya, J. (1997). Historia del arte argentino, Bs. As. Emecé Editores.
- López Anaya, J. (1977). Vanguardia y racionalidad Artículos, ensayos y otros escritos: 1946–1974, Barcelona. Gustavo Gilli.
- Mele, Juan N. (1999). La vanguardia del cuarenta en la Argentina. Memorias de un artista concreto. Bs. As. Ediciones Cinco.
- Mendez Mosquera, Perazzo, C., N. (1997). en texto preliminar Escritos preulmianos. Bs. As. Infinito.
- Nanni, M. (1987). "Manuel Espinosa" en Arte argentina dalla independenza ad oggi. 1810–1987. Istituto Italo-Latino americano, Roma.
- Olivera, E. (1986). "Las Geometrías", en Jornadas de Introducción al Arte Argentino, Bs. As. Citibank.
- Pacheco, M. (2002–2003). Arte Abstracto Argentino, Gallería d´Arte Moderna e Contemporanea di Bergamo, Italia. Fundación Proa, Bs. As.
- Pellegrini, A. (1966). Nuevas tendencias en la pintura, Bs. As. Muchnik Editores.
- Panorama de la pintura de la argentina contemporánea, Bs. As. Ed. Paidós. 1967.
- Perazzo, N.; Ribera, A.; Wihtelow, G. (1978). 100 años de pintura y escultura en la Argentina, 1878–1978, BS. AS. Banco de la Ciudad de Bs. As.
- Perazzo, Nelly (1983). El arte concreto en la Argentina, Bs. As. Ediciones de Arte Gaglianone.
- Pérez Barreiro, G (1994). "La negación de toda melancolía. Arte Concreto-Invención Arte Madi". Elliot, D (ed.) Art from Argentina 1920/1994. Oxford, Museum of Modern Art, 1994.
- Siracusano, G. (1999). "Las artes plásticas en las décadas del ´40 y ´50", en Nueva Historia Argentina. Tomo II: Arte, Sociedad y Política. Editorial Sudamericana, Bs. As.
- Withelow, G. (1995). "Rumbos de la abstracción pictórica" en Historia critica del arte argentino. AACA-Telecom Arg. Bs. As.
