= Carmelo Arden Quin =

Uruguayan artist

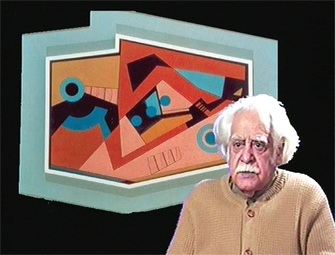
- Carmelo Arden Quin, Uruguayan poet, political writer, painter, sculptor and co-founder of the international artistic movement Madí
- Born: Carmelo Heriberto Alves; 16 March 1913; Rivera, Uruguay
- Died: 27 September 2010 (aged 97); Savigny-sur-Orge, France
- Occupation: Visual artist
- Years active: 1934-2010
- Known for: co-founder of Arte Madí movement in 1946

Carmelo Arden Quin (né Carmelo Heriberto Alves; 16 March 1913 – 27 September 2010) was a Uruguayan artist. Arden Quin’s primary focuses were painting and poetry. From a young age, Arden Quin was an ambitious and idealistic artist. Today, Arden Quin is most recognized for his co-founding of the Madí movement, which began in Argentina but ultimately became an international movement. Arden Quin’s commitment to invention, rather than replication or representation, drove his relentless pursuit of new forms and ideas.

== Early life ==
Quin was born Carmelo Heriberto Alves in 1913 in Rivera, Uruguay, to a single mother, his father having been murdered whilst his mother was pregnant. Three of his uncles helped raise him.. From an early age, Arden Quin showed an aptitude for art, designing and selling colorful kites to classmates as early as age eleven. This initial interest was cultivated by his uncle Miguel, who himself was a painter and sculptor. Arden Quin also received rudimentary lessons in painting from a close family friend during his teenage years. During this same time, Arden Quin and his friends began to participate in political demonstrations, which would galvanize his enduring involvement in political causes.

In 1934, Arden Quin began to experiment in his uncle Miguel's workshop. After painting a cubist work, Arden Quin had the idea to "reform" the painting's rectangular shape. Taking a pair of scissors, Arden Quin began to cut pieces out of the border of his painting. This experiment would be the beginning of a long career of artistic innovation. In the same year, Arden Quin left his family in Rivera for the Uruguayan capital of Montevideo.

== Career ==
Before Arden Quin moved to Buenos Aires during the late 1930s, he lived primarily in Montevideo, Uruguay, and also spent some time in Brazil. In Montevideo, Arden Quin frequented the cafés, or peñas, where painters and writers of the city gathered and discussed their works. In early 1935, a friend of Arden Quin invited him to a lecture at the Theosophical Society of Montevideo by Joaquín Torres-García, an esteemed and exceedingly well-traveled artist and the founder of the Universalismo movement, otherwise known as Universal Constructivism. He eagerly accepted the invitation and, after the lecture, Arden Quin's friend introduced the passionate young poet and artist to Torres-García, who invited Arden Quin to visit him in his studio. Torres-García would provide invaluable guidance and inspiration for Arden Quin, and would directly influence Arden Quin's development of Madí.

In 1937, Arden Quin left his home country for Buenos Aires, Argentina. Immediately, Arden Quin immersed himself in the culture of the city. As in Montevideo, he founded like-minded, motivated artists and political activists in the cafés, or tertulias, of Buenos Aires. Arden Quin also began to attend university art classes. Through his classes at the university and his time in the tertulias, the young artist and poet perpetually expanded his connections.

In this time his incubating plans for starting his own movement compelled him to recruit potential members. At the university Arden Quin would forge a friendship with poet Edgar Bayley. On a brief trip home to Uruguay in 1939 for an art exhibition, he would notice a young painter named Rhod Rothfuss. While working in a pencil factory in 1940, Arden Quin would meet a young Hungarian immigrant named Fernando Fallik, who would later be known to the art world as Gyula Kosice. These are among the few talents who would contribute to Arden Quin's efforts in the publication of Arturo, a precursor to Madí.

Early in the 1940s, Arden Quin was provided the opportunity to travel upriver from Buenos Aires deep into the rain forest to seek a job opportunity with an Argentine-Brazilian coffee company that was attempting to expand operations into neighboring Paraguay. Always eager for adventure and the prospect of "money-making schemes", Arden Quin boarded a steamboat, and found himself in Asunción, Paraguay, three days later. Though he never found employment with the coffee company, Arden Quin's experiences in Paraguay stimulated Arden Quin's creativity, and galvanized an immensely productive year of his life. Upon returning, he would draft his first manifesto and a significant part of a long prose poem, both of which would be featured in his journal Arturo. In addition, he painted Les Formes Noires, a series of six paintings that would be considered some of the most mysterious of his entire career. These works, heavily influenced by his trip up the river, and by a visit to the Natural Sciences Museum in Argentina, feature black oil "mask" shapes on cardboard with a single "eye" in each.

=== Arturo ===
In the following years, Arden Quin's Arturo idea would continue to take shape as he secured the contributions of many poets and artists. In 1942, the artist took a trip to Rio de Janeiro to continue these efforts. By the end of his visit, painter Maria Elena Vieira da Silva and poet Murilo Mendes provided contributions for the journal. Back in his home country, Arden Quin gathered a drawing, an essay, and two long poems from his friend Torres-García. He would also receive a poem from renowned Chilean poet Vicente Huidobro. At the end of the year, Arden Quin was back in Buenos Aires. There, he met the younger brother of Arturo collaborator Edgar Bayley, Tomás Maldonado. After showing Arden Quin around his studio, he was invited to join Arturo, and would end up designing the cover of the journal. With Maldonado came Lydia Prati, his fiancée, a talented young visual artist in her own respect. At this point, Arden Quin had garnered sufficient collaborators to finalize his plans for Arturo.

Arturo finally came to fruition in the summer of 1942. Approximately two hundred and fifty copies of the journal's first and only issue were sold in Buenos Aires. Though the journal did not send any immediate ripples through the art world, its impact is nonetheless significant. The journal was a defiant break from avant-garde styles of the day. The heart of the journal and its art rested on the idea that "meaning and signification" should be rejected in favor of "pure form". If one word could encapsulate the spirit of Arturo, it would be "invention". The journal would ultimately provide a foundation for an entire generation of Latin American artists in the Rio de Plata area. Furthermore, Arturo represents a seminal work in the development of Madí.

=== Madí ===
In 1946, before moving to Paris, Quin in collaboration with other artist and friends Martín Blaszko, Rhod Rothfuss, and Gyula Kosice, launched the Madí movement. The movement's main characteristics are: irregular frames, movable and displacing architecture, pan interval music composition and invented poetic propositions. Madí encompassed painting as well as design, sculpture, and architecture. Just as important as the art produced in the Madí movement was the aesthetic philosophy.

On 3 August 1946, Arden Quin read his Madí manifesto to a group of critics, journalists, and others in his milieu at the French Institute for Higher Learning in Buenos Aires. Madi's expressed purpose is to create an objective aesthetic reality through objective artistic elements. The manifesto, and indeed the movement, are rooted in Arden Quin's commitment to activism and politics, as well as from the artistic and ideological ideas of Torres-Garcia and the Futurism movement in Italy. In addition, Arden Quin found substantial inspiration from Heraclitus' and Hegel's theories of opposition, which explained how opposites remain in balance; how every thesis is balanced by an antithesis. The focus of Madí was also foundationally concrete, emphasizing the object and colors in themselves, rather than what they are perceived to represent. As described in his manifesto, Madí is a wide, cross-medium movement encapsulating poetry, art, theater, dance, and visual arts. Arden Quin provided a guiding framework for every form of Madí art. For example, he dictated that Madi drawings should be characterized as "an arrangement of points and lines on a surface that creates form or a relationship of planes."

This announcement was followed by a three-day festival displaying Madí art. Here Arden Quin would debut many new creations, including a set of mobiles titled "Escultura Movil Suspendida" ("Suspended Mobile Sculpture"), a transformable wooden sculpture "Escultura Amvobile", and about half a dozen "formes galbées" pieces collectively titled "Cosmopolis", which vaguely depict aerial views of urban settings. The festival also included contributions from past collaborators Rhod Rothfuss and Gyula Kosice.

In 1947, the movement experienced a rift, as personal difficulties led to a divergence in the movement with Arden Quin going one direction and Rothfuss and Kosice going the other. In 1948, Arden Quin moved to Paris, and returned to Argentina in 1955 for a year, but in 1956, he moved indefinitely to Paris.

In Paris, Arden Quin continued Madí, producing many more works throughout lifetime. The movement continues today. In 1995, Arden Quin underscored that its lack of broad recognition has actually been the secret to its longevity and ideological consistency: "Having never been taken over by the media, MADI has been able to travel through time in total independence." Today, Madí is represented by artists from several countries, including France, Hungary, Uruguay, Spain, Japan, Brazil and Venezuela. In 2003, the Madí Museum and Gallery opened in Dallas, Texas, United States. The permanent collection includes twenty-five of Arden Quin's works as well as pieces from eighteen other Madí artists spanning four continents.

Many artists have been members of this international artistic movement since the 1940s until today, including Rhod Rothfuss, Juan Bay, Esteban Eitler, Diyi Laañ, Valdo Wellington, Rodolfo Uricchio, Gyula Kosice, Nelly Esquivel, J. P. Delmonte, Maria Bresler, Abraham Linenberg, Éva Bányász, Salvador Presta, Eduardo Sabelli, Nair Oliveira, Ana Maria Bay, Muñoz Cota, Jorge Rivera, Ricardo Humbert, Alberto Scopelliti, Lisl Steiner, Aldo Prior, Isa Muchnik, Ricardo Pereyra, Alberto Hidalgo, Grete Stern, Juan Carlos Paz, and Ramon Melgar.

In 1993, Arden Quin was included in the MOMA exhibit of "Latin American Artists of the twentieth Century". Several of Arden's pieces can be found at the MADI Museum in Dallas, Texas, United States. Arden Quin died in Paris in 2010. After his dead, he was granted the Honour Konex Award for his legacy in Visual Arts in Argentina.

== Style ==
Arden Quin's personal style is full of contrasting colors and geometric patterns. Some of the main characteristic concepts in Quin's work are the irregular shaped frames called "formes galbées", which are alternations of concave and convex forms mainly in wood work; "plastique blanche", which are highly polished enameled wood pieces; and "coplanals", which are series of polygons forming a single piece that in some cases include moveable elements and sometimes remains static.

Arden Quin was committed to concrete art. This is accentuated best by an invitation to the Madí festival which read: "We express nothing, we represent nothing, we symbolize nothing...This work is in space and time: IT EXISTS."

== Works ==
His first painting, Naturel Morte Cubiste (Cubist Still Life) was created in 1934. At the age of 21, he met his mentor, the Uruguayan sculptor Joaquín Torres García who was directly influenced by Piet Mondrian and Michael Seufor.

In 1948, after his partner Sofía Kunst became pregnant, Arden Quin painted for her what his biographer and friend Shelley Goodman would claim is "arguably the most beautiful and certainly the most poignant work of his entire career." In his classic "forme galbée" style, Arden Quin painted nine "lunas" (moons) referring to the nine months of gestation, which would be collectively called "forme galbée bleue". The colors of the paintings depart significantly from his typical use of colors which were "dark and clouded in tone" in the style of "European values." In "forme galbée bleue," Arden Quin used vibrant blues, yellows, and whites.
