= Georges Vantongerloo =

Belgian artist (1886–1965)

Georges Vantongerloo (24 November 1886, Antwerp – 5 October 1965, Paris) was a Belgian sculptor, painter, designer of furniture and buildings, and founding member of the De Stijl group.

== Life ==
From 1905 to 1909 Vantongerloo studied Fine Art at the Fine Art Academies in Antwerp and Brussels. Conscripted into World War I, he was wounded in a gas attack and discharged from the army in 1914. In 1916 he met Theo van Doesburg, and the following year he was a co-signator of the first manifesto of the De Stijl group.

Vantongerloo's articles, published in the periodical De Stijl between September 1918 and October 1920 and known as "Réflexions", compare art with nature and address the aims of the arts and the artist.

His pamphlet L'Art et Son Avenir was published in 1924 and includes his essay "Unité", which examines vibrations and the colour spectrum of light.

In 1927 Vantongerloo moved to Paris and began a correspondence with the Belgian Prime Minister, Henri Jaspar, in relation to the design of a bridge over the Scheldt at Antwerp. In 1930 he joined the Cercle et Carré group in Paris, and a year later he was a founding member of Abstraction-Création.

From 1955 Vantongerloo had a long friendship with the Swedish sculptor Gert Marcus.

== Legacy ==
After Vantongerloo died in 1965, Max Bill, a close friend of his, began advocating for him. Bill's widow, the art historian Angela Thomas Schmid, set up the Max Bill Georges Vantongerloo Foundation to support the legacy of both artists. On the art market, the estate has been represented by Hauser & Wirth since 2019.
