= Raúl Lozza =

Argentine painter, draughtsman, designer, journalist and theorist

- Born: Elbio Raúl Lozza; October 27, 1911; Alberti, Buenos Aires Province, Argentina
- Died: January 27, 2008 (aged 96); La Paternal, Buenos Aires, Argentina
- Occupations: Painter; Designer; Theorist
- Years active: 1929-2008
- Children: 2
- Website: Museo Lozza

Elbio Raúl Lozza (October 27, 1911 – January 27, 2008) was an Argentine painter, draughtsman, designer, journalist, and theorist who was part of the concrete art movement. He was part of the Asociación Arte Concreto-Invención. He was the founder of the Perceptivist group. He was granted the Platinum Konex Award in Visual Arts from Argentina in 1992.

== Early life and education ==
Lozza was born in the town of Alberti in the Buenos Aires Province of Argentina, to parents Rafael Carlos Lozza, a designer, muralist, painter, paper-maker and musician, and Emma Lozza (née Righetti). Lozza's father had emigrated from the Lombardy region of Italy and his mother was the daughter of Italian immigrants. Lozza had two brothers: Rafael Obdulio Lozza and Rembrandt Van Dyck Lozza.

The family faced economic hardship after a tornado destroyed a theatre and other buildings Rafael Lozza had been working on. They continued to face economic hardship as Lozza's mother suffered from deteriorating mental health issues, which led to her being institutionalized in 1920, after which she escaped and disappeared. In 1923, Lozza's father committed suicide. Lozza and his brothers went to live with their maternal aunt, Amalia Righetti, and uncle, where they worked on their farm.

In 1925, Lozza left school. He did farm work during harvest time and worked as muleteer and bricklayer. Lozza began to work as a painter and paper-cutter, setting up a business with his brothers that gave them economic stability.

== Career ==
In 1929, the Lozza brothers moved to Buenos Aires to get further funding to study painting in Italy; however, the 1930 Argentine coup d'état made this impossible. During this time they studied theatre with José González Castillo and in December 1930 put on the play La sombra de la nada at the Teatro Roma de Alberti in collaboration with poet Vicente Barbieri and Juan Ferreyra Basso.

In 1932, after exhibiting paintings in a library in Almafuerte, in Flores and Alberti, as well as other venues, Lozza published an article called "A propósito del centenario de Goethe" in a periodical called La Zona. He also published poems and a play called Crepúsculos.

In 1933, Lozza, a member of the Communist Party at that time, was jailed for a month after protests of the treatment of political prisoners. During this period he became friends with Lino Enea Spilimbergo, Miguel Carlos Victorica, and the González Tuñón brothers: Raúl González Tuñón and Enrique González Tuñón. Lozza continued to be politically active, publishing illustrations and writings in the anti-fascist journal Socorro Rojo and La República.

In 1937, Lozza contracted tuberculosis, but continued to work. At this time, he worked as a painter, title broker, lingerie cutter, fabric stamper, and artist in the field of advertising. Lozza eventually starts a lingerie business called Lingerie Femenil. As part of that business he designed lingerie for many famous women, including Delia Garcés.

== Personal life ==
In 1938, Lozza married his first wife, with whom he had a son, Arturo Lozza. After they divorced, in 1947 Lozza began a relationship with the painter Antonia Belizán, who he later married and had a son, Carlos Raúl Lozza.

== Death ==
On January 27, 2008, Lozza died of natural causes, at the age of 96, in the La Paternal, neighborhood of Buenos Aires in Argentina. He is buried at Cementerio de la Chacarita.

== Selected exhibitions ==
=== Selected group exhibitions ===
- 1965: "Eugenio Abal, José Rodrigo Beloso, Raul Lozza. Paintings," Museu de Arte Moderna (Rio de Janeiro) [catalogue]
- 1980: "Vanguardias de la década del 40. Arte Concreto-Invención, Arte Madí, Perceptismo," Museo de Artes Plásticas Eduardo Sívori (Buenos Aires)
- 1989–1990: "Art in Latin America. The Modern Era, 1820–1980," The Hayward Gallery (London); Nationalmuseum / Moderna Museet (Stockholm); Palacio de Velázquez (Madrid)
- 1990: "Argentina. Arte concreto-invención 1945, Grupo Madí 1946," Rachel Adler Gallery (New York)
- 1992–1993: "Artistas latinoamericanos del siglo XX," Estación Plaza de Armas (Seville); Musée national d’art moderne, Centre national d’art et de culture Georges Pompidou (Paris); Josef-Haubrich-Kunsthalle (Cologne); The Museum of Modern Art (New York)
- 1994–1995: "Art from Argentina 1920–1994," Museum of Modern Art (Oxford) [traveling exhibition]
- 1997: "I Bienal de Artes Visuais do Mercosul" (Porto Alegre)
- 2001: "Abstract Art from Río de la Plata. Buenos Aires and Montevideo, 1933–1953," The Americas Society (New York)
- 2002: "50 años de pintura geométrica latinoamericana," Museo de Arte Contemporáneo Latinoamericano, La Plata (Buenos Aires)
- 2003–2004: "Arte abstracto argentino," Galleria d’arte moderna e contemporanea (Bergamo); Fundación Proa (Buenos Aires)
- 2006: "The Sites of Latin American Abstraction," Cisneros Fontanals Art Foundation (Miami, Florida) [traveling exhibition]
- 2007: "The Geometry of Hope. Latin American Abstract Art from the Patricia Phelps de Cisneros Collection," Blanton Museum of Art, The University of Texas at Austin (Austin, Texas); Grey Art Gallery, New York University (New York)
- 2009: "Geometric Abstract Works. The Latin American Vision from the 1950s, 60s and 70s," Henrique Faria Fine Art (New York)
- 2010: "Then & Now. Abstraction in Latin American Art from 1950 to Present," 60 Wall Gallery, Deutsche Bank (New York)
- 2010: "Vibración. Moderne Kunst aus Lateinamerika. The Ella Fontanals-Cisneros Collection," Bundeskunsthalle (Bonn)
- 2010: "Realidad y Utopía - Argentiniens künstlerischer Weg in die Gegenwart," Akademie der Künste (Berlin)

=== Selected solo exhibitions ===
- 1949: Galería Van Riel (Buenos Aires)
- 1963: Museu de Arte Moderna (Rio de Janeiro)
- 1969: Instituto de Arte (Buenos Aires)
- 1973: Galería Van Riel (Buenos Aires)
- 1985: "Cuarenta años en el arte concreto (sesenta con la pintura)," Fundación San Telmo (Buenos Aires) [catalogue]
- 1993: Fundación Banco Patricios (Buenos Aires)
- 1996: "Hermann Glöckner / Raúl Lozza, Batuz Foundation Sachsen," Altzella/Nossen (Dresden) [catalogue]
- 1997: "Retrospectiva 1939–1997," Museo de Arte Moderno (Buenos Aires) [catalogue]
- 2001: "Un museo por sesenta días. Selección de obra para un futuro museo de su pintura concreta," Centro Cultural Borges (Buenos Aires) [catalogue]
- 2002: "Una revisión a la relación arte-ciencia en la obra de Raúl Lozza," Centro Cultural Borges (Buenos Aires) [catalogue]
- 2006: Museo Nacional de Bellas Artes (Neuquén)

== Selected works ==
- Relief no. 30 at the Museum of Modern Art (1946)
- Invention no. 150 at the Museum of Modern Art (1948)

== Works and publications ==
- Lozza, Raúl; Haber, Abraham (essay by) (1949). Raúl Lozza: Primera exposición de pintura perceptista : 31 de octubre 12 de noviembre mil novecientos cuarenta y nueve, Van Riel Galería de Arte (in Spanish). Buenos Aires: Van Riel Galería de Arte. OCLC 966293590. – Includes Raúl Lozza's manifesto on perceptismo and an essay by Abraham Haber
- Lozza, Raúl (1985). Raúl Lozza: Cuarenta años en el arte concreto: (Sesenta con la pintura): 22 de Julio – 18 de Agosto (in Spanish). Buenos Aires: Fundación San Telmo. OCLC 79426605. – Catalog of an exhibition held at the Fundación San Telmo, Buenos Aires, 22 de Julio–18 de Agosto 1985
- Lozza, Raúl; Batuz (introduction by); Sanguinetti, Julio M. (preface by) (1996). Raúl Lozza. Artzella: Société Imaginaire, Batuz Foundation Sachsen. OCLC 926104700.
- Lozza, Raúl; El Azem, Karina; Bairon, Elba; Di Girolamo, Martín; Erlich, Leandro (1999). ARCO '99 Madrid. Paralelos/paralelas: Raúl Lozza, Karina El Azem, Elba Bairon, Martín Di Girolamo, Leandro Erlich (Exhibition catalog) (in Spanish). Argentina: Fondo Nacional de las Artes. OCLC 948139367.
- Lozza, Raúl (1997). Raúl Lozza: Retrospectiva 1939-1997 (Exhibition catalog) (in Spanish). Buenos Aires: Museo de Arte Moderno. OCLC 38557461.
- Lozza, Raúl (2001). Raúl Lozza: Un museo por sesenta días: Selección de obra para un futuro museo de su pintura concreta: Centro Cultural Borges (in Spanish). Buenos Aires: Centro Cultural Borges. OCLC 53104785. – Catalog of an exhibition held at Centro Cultural Borges, De. 2001–Feb. 2002
- Lozza, Raúl (2002). "La pintura como mentira y otras editoriales en perceptismo". Selecciones de Amadeo Mandarino (in Spanish). 17. Buenos Aires: Amadeo Mandarino. OCLC 85173826.
- Lozza, Raúl (2003). "Ensayo de apertura hacia mi teoría estructural del color". Selecciones de Amadeo Mandarino (in Spanish). 18. Buenos Aires: Amadeo Mandarino. OCLC 85173828.
- Lozza, Raúl; Benarós, León (2005). Toda una historia en un trozo de vida: Veinte cartas de un pintor (Raúl Lozza) a un escritor (León Benarós) (in Spanish). Buenos Aires: Self-published. OCLC 912626596.
