= Max Huber (graphic designer) =

Swiss graphic designer (1919–1992)

Max Huber (5 June 1919 – 16 November 1992) was an influential Swiss graphic designer.

== Biography ==
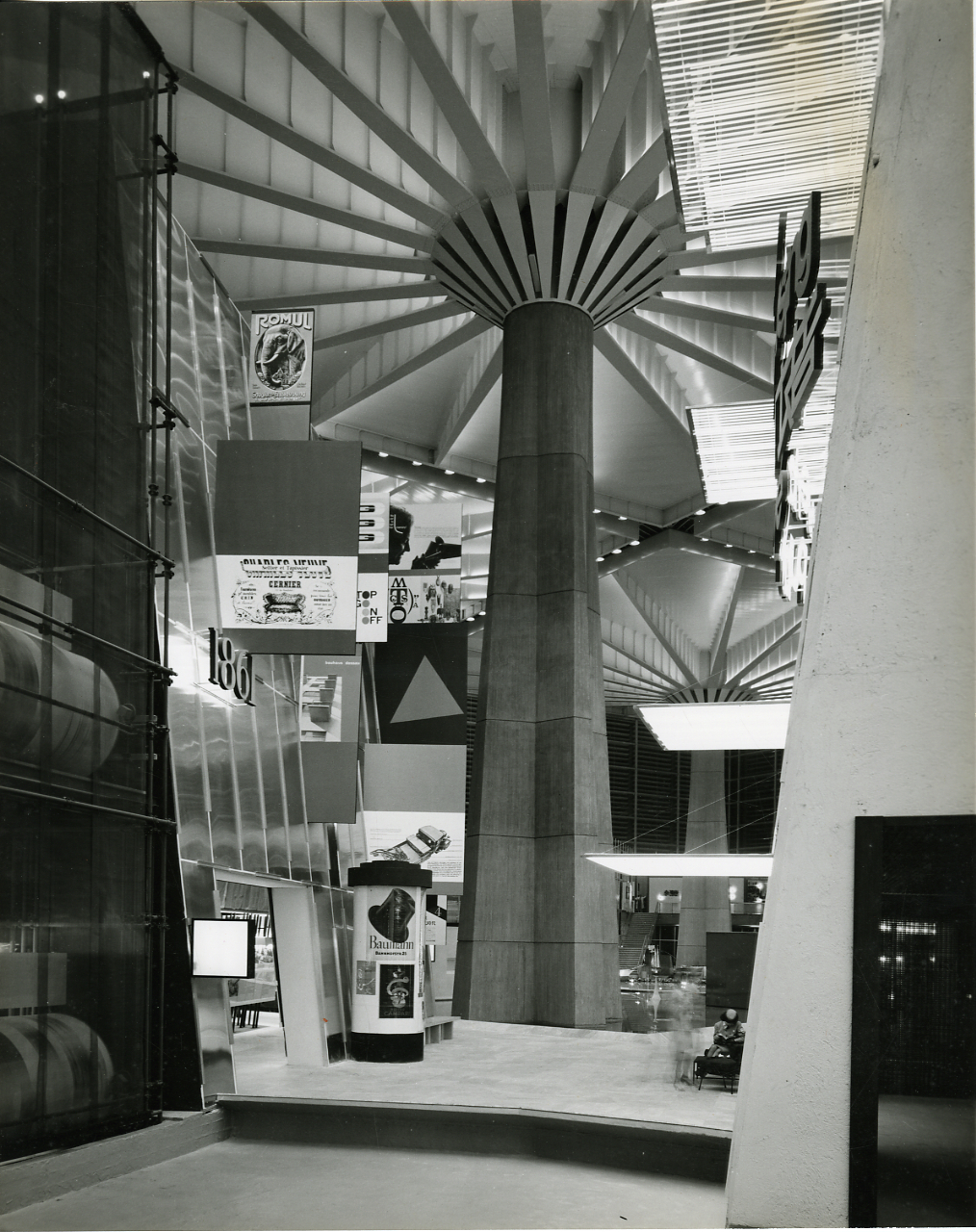
Expo 61, Turin. Details of the exhibition La pubblicità, at Palazzo del Lavoro, by Max Huber. Photo by Paolo Monti.

Max Huber was born in Baar, Switzerland in 1919. He graduated from Kunstgewerbeschule in Zurich under the name Hans Williman. In his formative years, he met Werner Bischof, Josef Müller-Brockmann, Carlo Vivarelli and Hans Falk.

His career began in 1935 in Zurich, where he worked for an advertising agency and later with Emil Schultness at Conzett&Huber. He met Max Bill and Hans Neuburg.

With the beginning of World War II – in order to avoid being drafted in the Swiss army – he moved to Milan to join Studio Boggeri. When Italy entered the war in 1941, Huber was forced to move back to Switzerland, where he began a collaboration with Werner Bischof and Emil Schultness for the influential art magazine Du.

He joined the group Allianz, and in 1942, he exhibited his abstract work at the Kunsthaus Zurich with Max Bill, Leo Leuppi, Richard Lohse and Camille Graeser.

With the end of the war, he went back to Milan. The Italian publisher Einaudi appointed him as creative director for the publishing house. The job put him in contact with the post-war Italian intelligentsia: Cesare Pavese, Natalia Ginzburg, Elio Vittorini, Franco Fortini, Ettore Sottsass, Achille Castiglioni and Albe Steiner.

The following years were marked by some of his most iconic and influential designs. With Albe Steiner, he worked for the VIII Triennale di Milano. A keen jazz fan, he designed a series of stunning record covers, music magazines and the set stage for a jazz festival. He met Louis Armstrong. In 1948, he designed the seminal poster for the Autodromo Nazionale di Monza Grand Prix and two years later the corporate identity for the supermarket chain La Rinascente. With Achille Castiglioni, he designed large-scale installations for RAI, Eni and Montecatini.

In 1954, he was awarded the prestigious Compasso d'Oro. In 1958, he travelled to the US as a speaker to the First International Seminar on Typography (New York Art Directors Club).

In 1965, the Nippon Design Committee organised an exhibition of his work at Matsuya Design Gallery in Tokyo. This trip was the beginning of the designer's close ties with Japan, which would culminate in his marrying the artist and illustrator Aoi Kono.

In his later years, he alternated between commercial commissions, personal visual experimentation and teaching graphic design at Scuola Umanitaria in Milan, at Scuola Politecnica di Design also in Milan and finally at CSIA (Centro Scolastico Industrie Artistiche) in Lugano.

He died in Mendrisio in 1992.

m.a.x.museo, a museum dedicated to his name and preserving his personal archive, opened in Chiasso in 2005.
