= Allianz (arts) =

Allianz was a group of Swiss artists formed in 1937, best known for promoting the principles of concrete art with a particular emphasis on colour. The movement was central to the development of modern art in Switzerland and influenced post-war abstract art across Europe.

== History ==
The Allianz group supported the theories of Max Bill, building on Constructivist approaches but with a distinctive focus on chromatic relationships. Their first group exhibition, Neue Kunst in der Schweiz, was held at Kunsthalle Basel in 1937, followed by shows at the Kunsthaus Zürich in 1942 and 1947. Further exhibitions took place at the Galerie des Eaux Vives in Zürich, beginning in 1944, under the direction of John Konstantin Hansegger, who was both the gallery founder and a founding Allianz artist.

== Publications ==
In 1941 the group published the Almanach Neuer Kunst in der Schweiz, which reproduced works by Allianz members alongside artists such as Paul Klee, Le Corbusier, Gérard Vulliamy and Kurt Seligmann. The almanac also included theoretical texts by Bill, Leo Leuppi, Le Corbusier, Seligmann, Sigfried Giedion, and others. Editions des Eaux-Vives in Zürich issued illustrated bulletins of Allianz exhibitions, featuring writings by Hansegger, Johannes Sorge, Max Bill and Ugo Pirogallo.

== Legacy ==
Allianz exhibitions continued into the 1950s, helping to establish Switzerland as an important center for abstract and concrete art in the mid-20th century.

== Allianz artists ==
- Max Bill
- Camille Graeser
- Hansegger
- André Evard
- Fritz Glarner
- Max Huber
- Leo Leuppi
- Richard Paul Lohse
- Verena Loewensberg
