= Lora Lamm =

Swiss graphic designer (1928–2025)

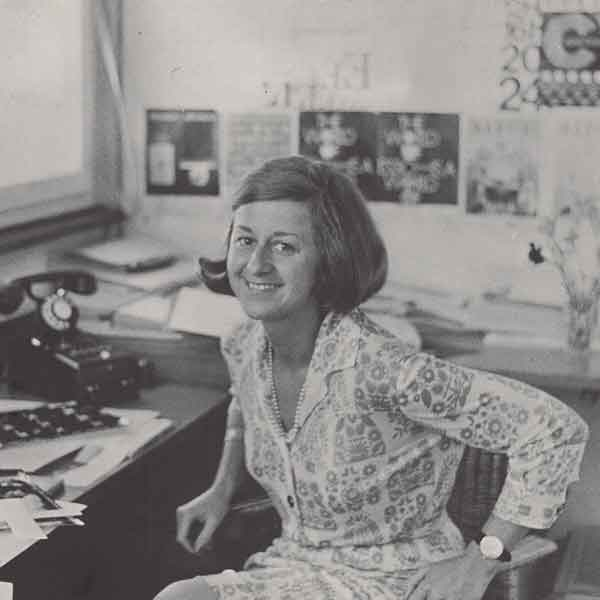
- Lora Lamm in 1963 working in Frank Thiessing's studio in Zurich
- Born: 11 January 1928; Arosa
- Died: 23 March 2025 (aged 97); Zurich
- Occupation: Art director, graphic designer
- Awards: Swiss Grand Award for Design (2015)

Lora Lamm (11 January 1928, Arosa – 23 March 2025) was a Swiss illustrator and graphic designer known for her works for Pirelli and La Rinascente. Her distinctive style, characterized by clean lines, bold use of colour, and playful experimentation, made her prominent in graphic design during the 1950s and 1960s.

== Life and career ==
=== Training and early career ===
On the suggestion of a teacher at her secondary school, Lamm trained in graphic design at the Zurich Kunstgewerbeschule (School of Arts and Craft) under Johannes Itten, Ernst Keller and Ernst Gubler, among others. After graduation, between 1952 and 1953, she worked for a short period in the graphic design studio of Romain Sager in Zurich, part of the Triplex agency, before moving to Milan upon the advice of Max Huber, who had also attended the Kunstgewerbeschule.

=== Graphic designer in Milan ===
Soon after moving to Milan in 1953, Lamm began working for Studio Boggeri, a centret for Italian graphic design during those years, under the coordination of Frank C. Thiessing. The Studio, founded by Antonio Boggeri in 1933, viewed some of the most Italian, German, and Swiss graphic designers, like Erberto Carboni, Fortunato Depero, Franco Grignani, Max Huber, Enzo Mari, Armando Milani, Bruno Monguzzi, Bob Noorda, Xanti Schawinsky, Albe Steiner and Carlo Vivarelli. Despite the mainly male working environment, she quickly established herself, transitioning from package design to a significant collaboration with Panettoni Motta Milano.

In 1954, she began working in the advertising department of La Rinascente, an Italian department store chain based in Milan, under the direction of Gianni Bordoli. Here she met Amneris Latis, a Swiss designer whom she considers her first important mentor. During her years at La Rinascente, she also worked freelance for Pirelli, Elizabeth Arden, Olivetti, Niggi Cosmetica and Consorzio Latte Milano. In 1958, she was promoted to head of the creative department after Max Huber left the role. From this moment, she was also allowed to sign her work. Her contribution to La Rinascente consisted of catalogues, posters, advertisements, invitations, mailers, packaging and other publicity, besides the curation of the Il Giappone ("Japan") exhibit of 1956.

=== Return to Switzerland ===
In 1963, Lamm returned to Switzerland and continued her work as a freelance graphic designer. She then began working for the Frank C. Thiessing, BSR agency, which operated in Zurich and Lugano. She stopped working as graphic designer in 2000.

Lamm died on 23 March 2025, at the age of 97.

== Graphic style ==
Although illustration is the essential component of Lora Lamm's style, she still considered herself a graphic designer.. Her works "stand out by their originality from the models of the designers at that time greatly in vogue in Milan" (Mario Piazza). She shifted the role of the poster from an artistic endorsement to a "work of art in the service of the advertisement" (Mario Piazza).

== Exhibitions and awards ==
=== Exhibitions ===
- Zürich HB – Milano Centrale (2006). Museum für Gestaltung Zürich, Zurich. October 24, 2006 – February 23, 2007
- Lora Lamm. Grafica a Milano 1953–1963 / Graphic design in Milan 1953–1963 (2013). m.a.x. museo, Chiasso (CH). May 24, 2013 – July 21, 2013
- Lora Lamm – La vita è bella (2015). Museum für Gestaltung Zürich. June 24, 2015 – August 16, 2015

=== Awards ===
- Schweizer Grand Prix Design (2015)
