= Anton Stankowski =

German painter

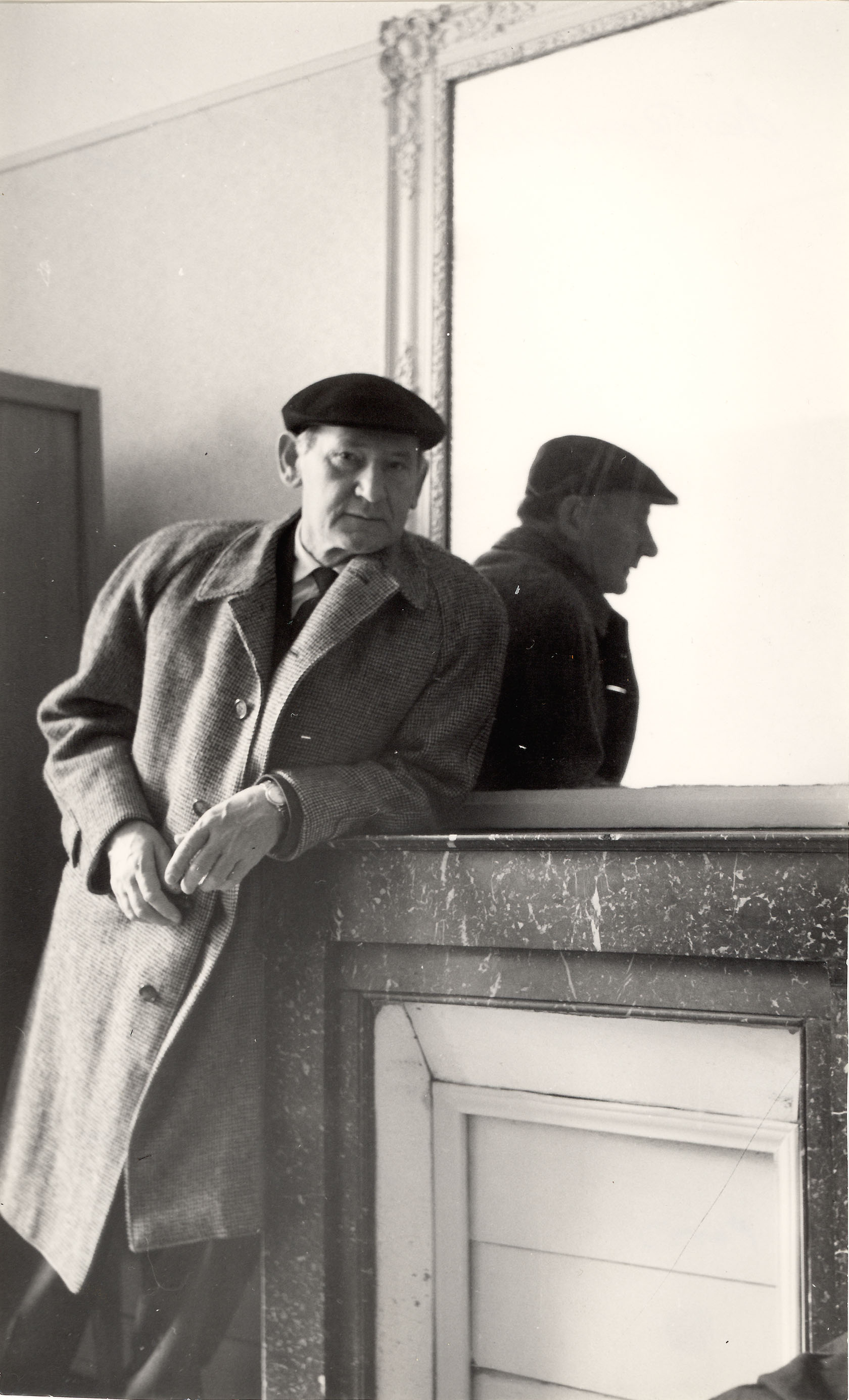
Anton Stankowski in Paris, 1958

Anton Stankowski (June 18, 1906 – December 11, 1998) was a German graphic designer, photographer and painter. He developed an original Theory of Design and pioneered Constructive Graphic Art. Typical Stankowski designs attempt to illustrate processes or behaviours rather than objects. Such experiments resulted in the use of fractal-like structures before the term 'fractal' was coined by Benoît Mandelbrot in 1975.

== Early life ==
Anton Stankowski was born in Gelsenkirchen, Westphalia. Before embarking on the profession of graphic designer, Stankowski worked as a decorator and church painter. In 1927 he attended the Folkwang Schule with fellow photographer, Max Burchartz.

== Professional career ==
In 1929, Stankowski moved to Zurich, where he worked at the renowned advertising studio of Max Dalang. This is where he developed 'constructive' graphic art with his new photo- and typographic view. His friends in Zurich Richard Paul Lohse, Heiri Steiner, Hans Neuburg, as well as Hans Coray, Hans Fischli, Herbert Matter, Ernst A. Heiniger, Verena Loewensberg, Max Bill and others formed a cultural circle. During these years Stankowski completed his famous 'Theory of Design' in which he worked out fundamental forms of expression. In 1934, he had to leave Switzerland due to the withdrawal of his official work permit and, after staying in Lörrach in 1938, he came to Stuttgart where he worked as a freelance graphic designer. In 1940, he joined the forces and became prisoner of war until 1948. After returning, he worked for Stuttgarter Illustrierte magazine as an editor, graphic designer and photographer.

In 1951, he established his own graphic design studio on the Killesberg in Stuttgart. With Willi Baumeister, Max Bense, Walter Cantz, Egon Eiermann, Mia Seeger and others a new cultural circle developed. He taught at the Ulm School of Design. His work on the graphic design field for IBM, SEL etc., especially his 'functional' graphic designs are exemplary.

Viessmann logo

In the 1960s, Stankowski created the now legendary 'Berlin layout', the city's visual identity, as well as the word trademarks IDUNA and VIESSMANN. Between 1969 and 1972 he was chairman of the Committee for Visual Design for the Olympic Games in Munich.

Deutsche Bank logo

The 1970s saw the creation of famous logos and trademarks, such as the one for the Deutsche Bank, the Münchner Rückversicherungen, REWE and Olympic Congress Baden-Baden alongside many others. The Deutsche Bank logo was ranked second in Creative Review's top 20 logos of all time. As Patrick Burgoyne, the editor of Creative Review magazine put it, "The Deutsche Bank square is neat visual shorthand for the type of values you might want in a bank security (the square) and growth (the oblique line)".

For Stankowski there was no separation between free and applied art. Many of his photographic and painterly works flow into his functional graphic design. From the mid-1970s onwards he increasingly turned to painting. His painterly oeuvre from the late 1920s to the late 1990s shows a continuity of constructive-concrete art. The exhibitions from 1928 onwards in the fields of graphic art, painting and photography point out the same way.

In 1976, the state of Baden-Württemberg conferred on him a professorship, and Stankowski, who was seen as a pioneer of graphic design, received innumerable awards and tributes, the most recent being the City of Stuttgart's Molfenter Award in 1991.

By 1980, Stankowski had produced a volume of trademarks for clients in and Switzerland. In 1983, he established the Stankowski Foundation to make awards to others for bridging the domains of fine and applied art, as he himself had done. Following his death in December 1998, the German Artist Federation awarded him the honorary Harry Graf Kessler Award for his life work.

Stankowski's work is noted for straddling the camps of fine and applied arts by synthesising information and creative impulse. He was inspired by the abstract paintings of Piet Mondrian, Theo van Doesburg, Malevich and Kandinsky. He advocated graphic design as a field of pictorial creation that requires collaboration with free artists and scientists.

== References and sources ==
Sources

- Stankowski, Anton (1967). Visual Presentation of Invisible Processes: How to Illustrate Invisible Processes in Graphic Design. New York: Hastings House.
- Stankowski, Anton (1981). Anton Stankowsi. Malerei und Fotografie. In: Dreissiger Jahre Schweiz. Konstruktive Kunst 1915-45. Winterthur: Kunstmuseum Winterthur.
