= Chirathivat family =

Thai Chinese business family

Chirathivat จิราธิวัฒน์ Saejeng
- Parent family: Zheng family
- Current region: Bangkok
- Origin: Hainan, China
- Founded: 1927
- Founder: Tiang Chirathivat
- Current head: Tos Chirathivat
- Connected families: House of Kitiyakara; Hongsakula family
- Heirlooms: Central Group

The Chirathivat family (Thai: จิราธิวัฒน์, pronounced [tɕìrāːtʰíwát]) is a Thai family of Chinese descent. The family was headed by Tiang Chirathivat (simplified Chinese: 郑心平; traditional Chinese: 鄭心平; pinyin: Zhèng Xīnpíng; 1905–1968), who migrated to Siam from Hainan and settled in Bangkok in 1927. Tiang's original Chinese surname was Cheng. He had 26 children with three wives that resulted in roughly 220 descendants today. Fifty-one are currently involved in the business. His descendants jointly own and manage the Central Group, and are ranked third on Forbes' list of Thailand's fifty richest.

The Central Group owns more than 60 department stores and shopping malls. It also operates hotels and restaurants, with a total of 5,000 outlets. The Chirathivat family bought the upscale Italian department store chain, La Rinascente, for a reputed US$291 million. The purchase was announced in May 2011 by Tos Chirathivat, a Central Group executive. In 2020, the Central Group announced the purchase of the Swiss luxury department store Globus alongside other assets for more than US$1 billion in a joint venture with the Austrian Signa, which announced insolvency in November 2023.

== Notable members ==
- Tos Chirathivat
- Pachara Chirathivat
