= Vittorio Radice =

- Born: 2 April 1957 (age 69); Como, Italy
- Education: University of Milan
- Occupation: Businessman
- Years active: 1990–present
- Known for: Overhaul of Selfridges and La Rinascente department stores
- Spouse: Gemma Vidal (m. 1986)
- Children: 2

Vittorio Radice (born 2 April 1957, in Como) is an Italian businessman, investor, retail veteran, chairman of Switzerland's Globus and chairman of Italy's la Rinascente S.p.A.. Credited with revamping London department store Selfridges, 150-year-old Italian department store La Rinascente, Berlin's Kaufhaus des Westens and Switzerland's Globus.

== Early life ==
The son of a furniture retailer, Vittorio surprised himself and his family by studying agriculture at Milan University before doing his military service. After leaving the army, he joined Associated Merchandising Corporation, then one of the largest global buying organisations for Department Stores. By the age of thirty, he was responsible for developing ranges and sourcing furniture and home furnishings in more than twenty countries.

== Early business career and Habitat UK ==
In 1990, he joined Habitat International as buying director, when it was part of the Storehouse group, to set up a central purchasing operation. He was appointed managing director of Habitat UK in 1992, shortly before the company was sold to IKEA, and set about the transformation of an ailing business with losses of £7 million into a company twice the size and with profits of over £12 million.

== Selfridges ==
He continued to build on success at Habitat until he was headhunted to join Selfridges as managing director in 1996. In this role, he transformed what was a "comfy old cardigan" of a store into the "big sexy giant" that it now is.

In 1998, Vittorio led the successful de-merger of Selfridges from the Sears conglomerate. On the back of continuous increases in sales and profit, the Selfridges market value doubled in 4 years. The company was taken private again in July 2003.

== Rinascente and Central Group ==
In 2003, Vittorio was headhunted by Marks & Spencer to set up a new chain of stores dedicated to home furnishings. The first store called Lifestore opened in Newcastle in February 2004. Upon the opening of the first pilot home store, Vittorio's role was extended. He was given responsibility for all areas of merchandising, excluding food, including store design & development. However, this new role was short-lived. In spring 2004, a new chairman and Chief Executive were appointed, and new strategies were announced. As a consequence, Vittorio left the company in June 2004.

In early 2005, following the acquisition of La Rinascente by a consortium of private equity and real estate funds, he was appointed chief executive of the Rinascente Department Store business. After a successful program of remodelling and re-positioning of the business, in 2011 Rinascente was sold to Central Retail Corporation of Thailand, with Vittorio remaining at the helm as CEO. In May 2012, he assumed the role of vice chairman in charge of international development. In 2013, Rinascente acquired Danish department store Illum, kick-starting a long-term ambition of building a collection of European historic department stores under the CRC I Rinascente umbrella. This project found further ground early in 2015 with the acquisition of the iconic German Kadewe Group. Vittorio is now fully immersed in the transformation of the newly acquired stores.

== Radio ==
He appeared as a castaway on the BBC Radio programme Desert Island Discs on 8 June 2003.
