= Härzlisee =

Artificial lake in Obwalden, Switzerland

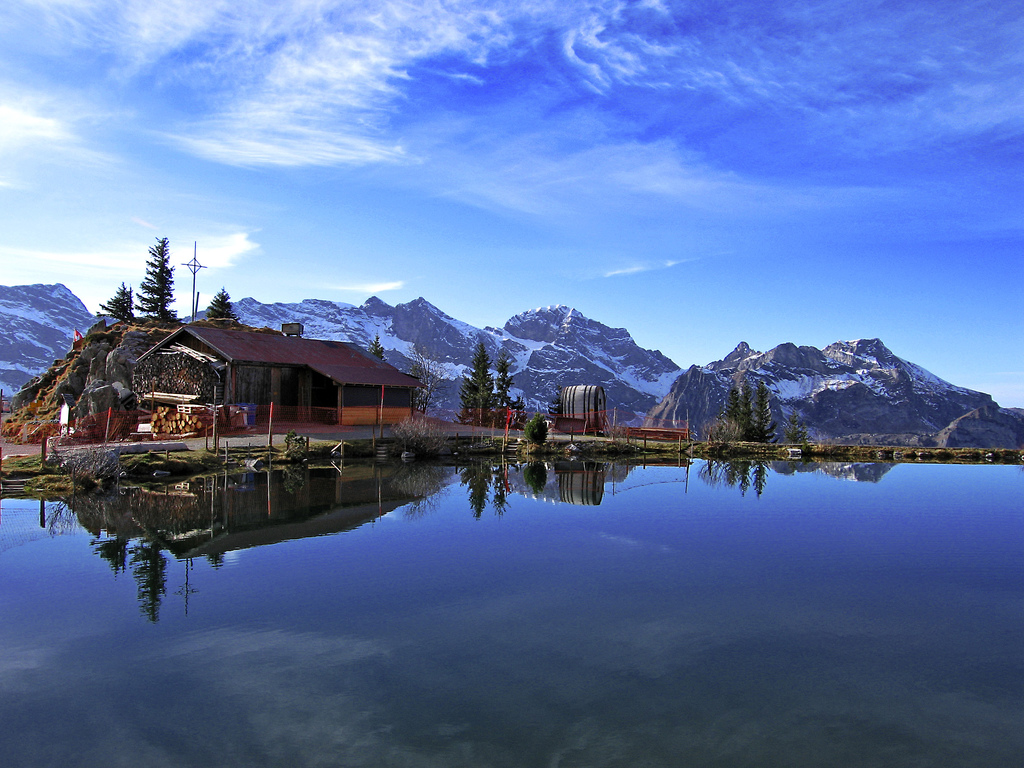

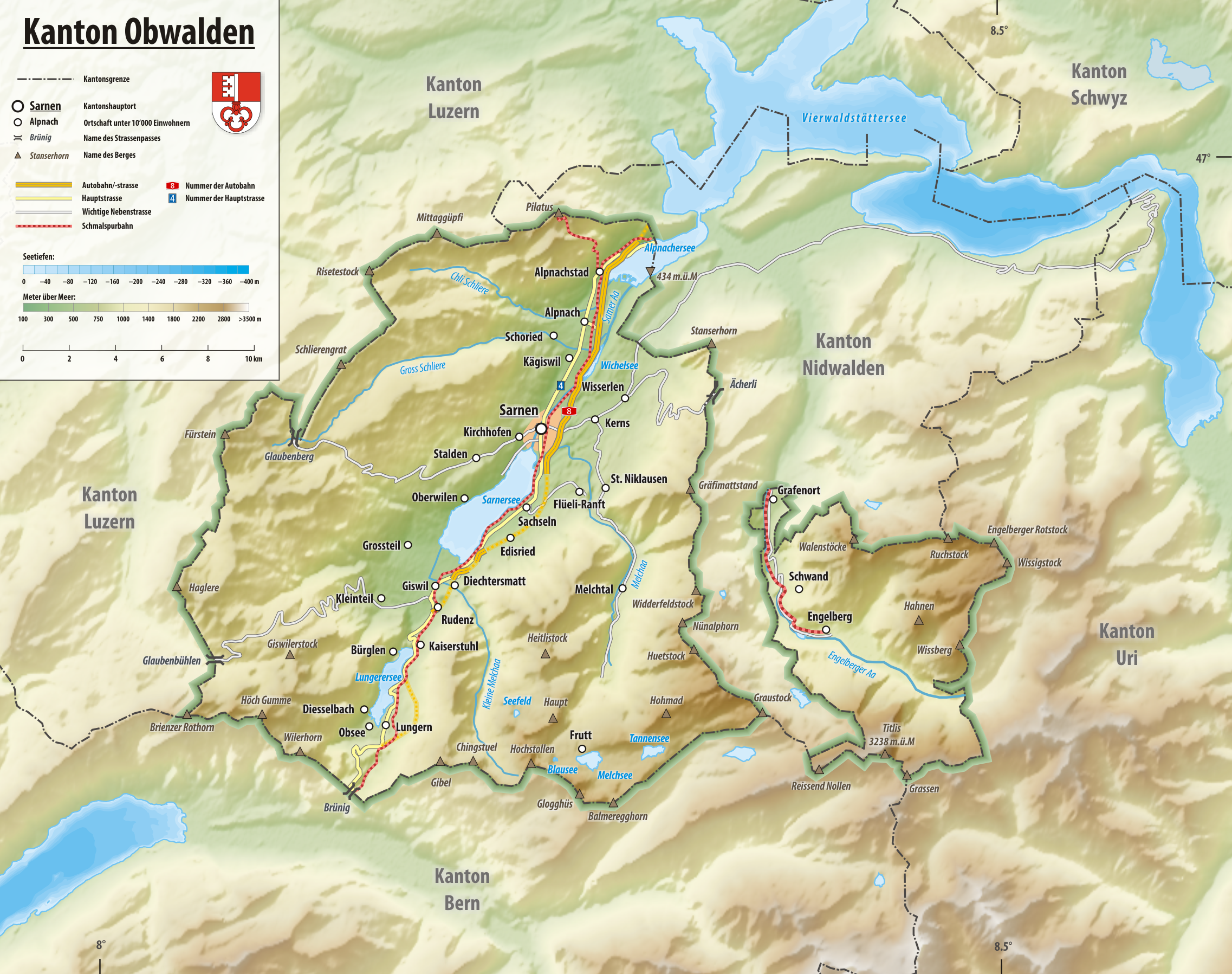
- Location within Canton of Obwalden Location within Canton of Bern Location within Canton of Valais Location within Switzerland Location within Alps
- Interactive map of Härzlisee
- Location: Obwalden
- Coordinates: 46°50′29″N 8°24′40″E
- Basin countries: Switzerland
- Surface area: 0.003 km^{2} (0.0012 mi^{2}; 0.30 ha; 0.74 acres)
- Surface elevation: 1,861 m (6,106 ft)

The Härzlisee is an artificial lake in Obwalden, Switzerland. It was created to serve the tourist area of Brunni.

== See also ==
- List of lakes of Switzerland
