= Globi =

Swiss cartoon character

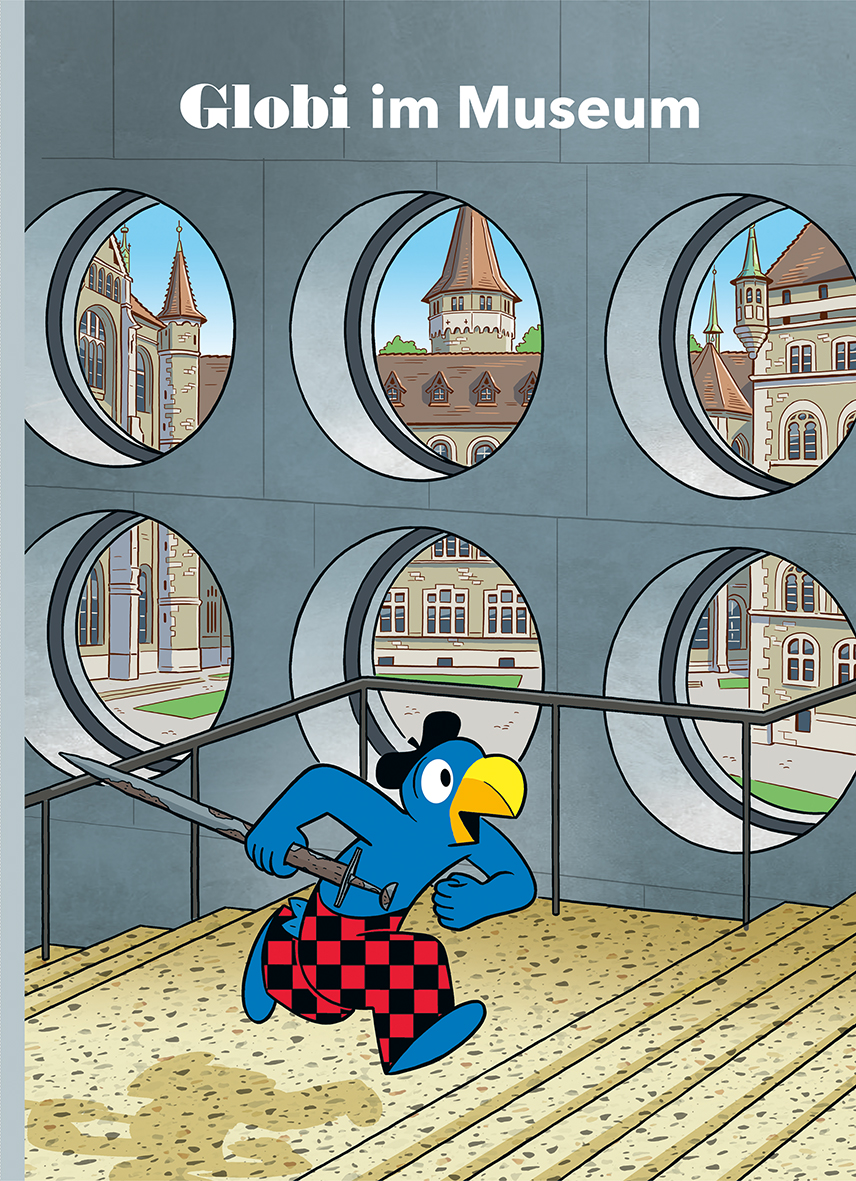
- Book cover from Landesmuseum Zürich
- First appearance: 1932
- Created by: Robert Lips

In-universe information
- Species: Parrot
- Gender: Male
- Nationality: Swiss

Globi is a Swiss cartoon character occasionally referred to as Switzerland's Mickey Mouse. He is pictured as an anthropomorphic blue parrot with a yellow beak wearing a black beret and a pair of red and black checkered trousers. He was created by the Swiss cartoonist Robert Lips, as an advertising character for the Swiss department store Globus in 1932 for the company's 25th anniversary. His name was originally planned as "Kimbukku", but he was later renamed Globi after the local Basel German (Baseldytsch) dialect word for the department store that created him.

== History ==
He initially appeared in a cartoon strip called Der Globi, and later appeared in a cartoon picture-book form called Globi's World Voyage in 1935. By 1944, the character gained so much popularity that Globus created a separate company for their mascot, and in 1948 Globi had sold over one million picture books. He was introduced in other markets such as the Netherlands, Belgium and Brazil, but did not do as well. In the 1970s, he was accused of being sexist, racist, and promoting violence, which was based on the attitudes of the 1940s and 1950s, but the books in question were then withdrawn and revised.

== Present ==
He is one of the most popular characters in the German-speaking part of Switzerland, with sales of over 9 million books.

In October 2003, a full-length film, Globi and the Stolen Shadows was made which was based on him. It was directed by Robi Engler in the anime style. Beside the books, there is a lot of Globi merchandise, including stuffed toys, crockery, cutlery, clocks, school equipment, card games, food. Since December 2008, the Swiss town of Engelberg has hosted a Globi theme park in its Brunni area.
