= Verena Loewensberg =

Swiss painter (1912–1986)

- Born: May 28, 1912; Zürich, Switzerland
- Died: April 27, 1986 (aged 73); Zürich, Switzerland
- Known for: Painting
- Movement: Concrete art
- Spouse: Hans Coray (m. 1931)

Verena Loewensberg (May 28, 1912 – April 27, 1986) was a Swiss painter and graphic designer.

== Life ==
Verena Loewensberg was born on May 28, 1912 in Zürich. She studied at the Basel Gewerbeschule. She also studied weaving with Martha Guggenbühl and dance with Trudi Schoop.

She was married to the designer Hans Coray with whom she had two children. The couple divorced in 1949. In 1953 she married Alfons Wickart.

Loewensberg had a lifelong friendship with the painter Max Bill and his wife Binia.

In 1936 she painted the first concrete pictures and helped in 1937 with the founding of an association of modern artists in Zurich. In the center were the Zürcher Konkreten. Loewensberg associated with Max Bill, Camille Graeser and Richard Paul Lohse. She participated in their successful group exhibitions. In addition, she was inspired by the work of Georges Vantongerloo and Piet Mondrian. In the 1950s and 1960s she worked for Guhl and Geigy. She also taught.

In 1964 Loewensberg opened a jazz record shop, City Discount, which closed in 1970.

Loewensberg died on April 27, 1986 in Zürich.

== Exhibitions ==
In 1936, she was included in the exhibition Zeitprobleme in der Schweizer Malerei und Plastik (Time Problems in Swiss Painting and Sculpture) at the Kunsthaus Zürich. In 2012 the Kunstmuseum Winterthur held a retrospective entitled Verena Loewensberg – Retrospektive. Loewensberg's work was included in the 2021 exhibition Women in Abstraction at the Centre Pompidou.

Her work is in the collection of the Buffalo AKG Art Museum.
