= Robert Lips =

Swiss cartoonist

- Born: Robert Lips; 21 August 1912 Zurich, Switzerland
- Died: 28 February 1975 (aged 62)
- Area: Cartoonist
- Notable works: Globi

Robert Lips (21 August 1912 – 28 February 1975), was a Swiss cartoonist. He is best known as the creator of the cartoon character Globi for the company Globus. He was also a fencer and competed in the individual and team épée events at the 1948 Summer Olympics.
