= Anna Indermaur =

Swiss artist

- Born: January 28, 1894; Rheineck, Switzerland
- Died: October 23, 1980 (aged 86); Zürich, Switzerland
- Known for: Painting; sculpture; interior decorating; filmmaking

Anna Indermaur (28 January 1894 – 23 October 1980) was a Swiss painter, sculptor, interior decorator, and filmmaker. She was the first woman film director in Switzerland.

== Biography ==
Indermaur was born on 28 January 1894 in Rheineck. She was a member of the In der Maur family, who once owned fiefdoms and vineyards in the Rheintal.

She joined the Groupe Suisse Abstraction et Surréalisme, founded by Leo Leuppi, in 1934 and was editor of the Dôme Journal from 1933 to 1935.

Indermaur moved to Zürich and opened Nord-Süd cinema studio in 1935 as the first Swiss woman film director. The opening of her studio angered the established film community, which did not include women at the time, and led to boycotts of her studio.

She was friends with Else Lasker-Schüler and they held readings together at her cinema studio. She joined the artist group Allianz, founded by Leuppi and Richard Paul Lohse, in 1937.

She created wallpaper and furniture designs, and set up Paul Facchetti's gallery in Zürich. She died on 23 October 1980.
