= Neue Grafik =

Defunct quarterly graphic design journal

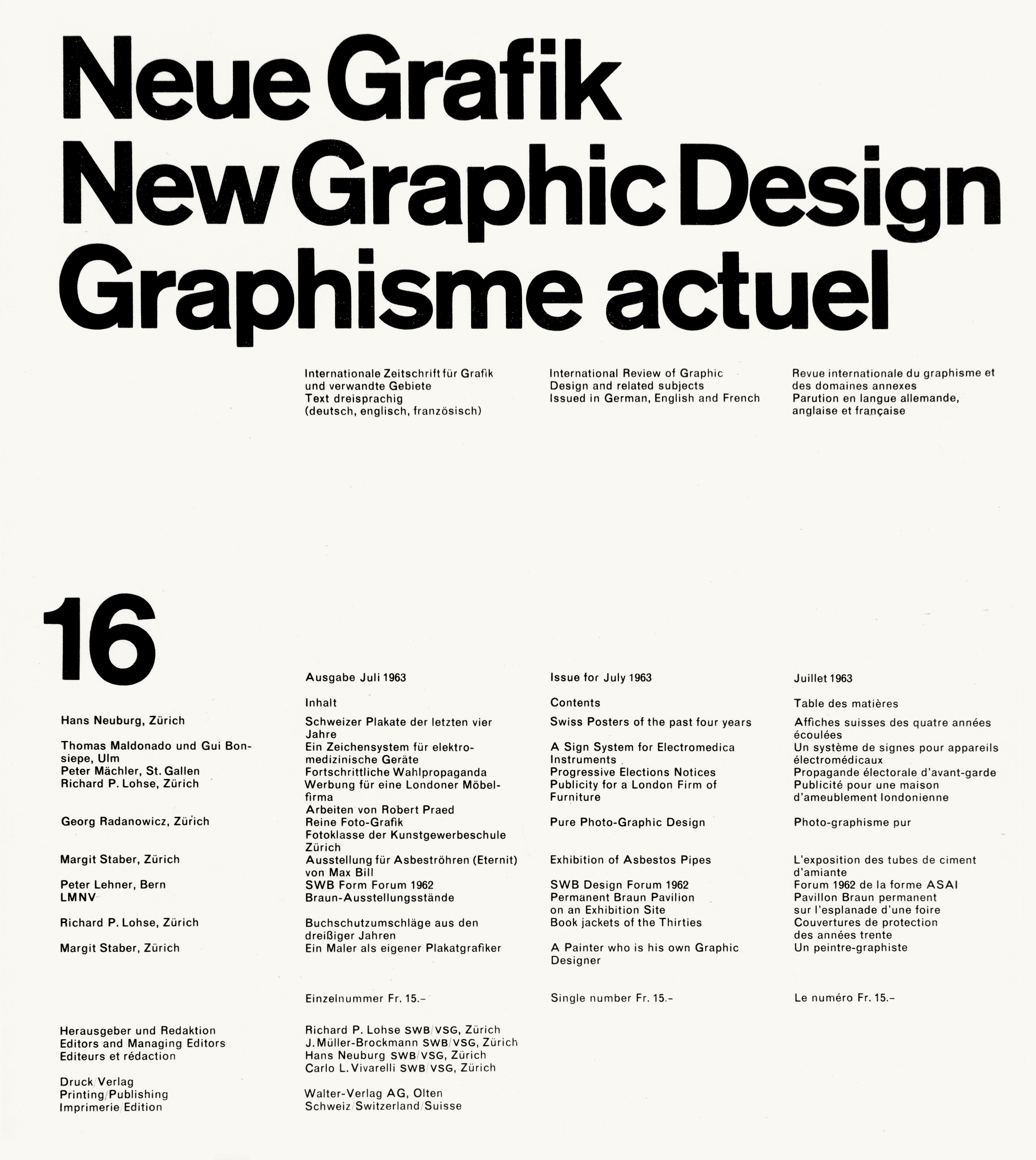
Neue Grafik cover (layout designed by Carlo Vivarelli)

Neue Grafik (transl. New Graphic Design, French: Graphisme Actuel) was a quarterly graphic design journal founded in 1958. The journal disseminated the tenets of the International Typographic Style and was key in its emergence as a movement. Eighteen issues of the journal were published from 1958 to 1965.

== History ==
Neue Grafik was founded by Josef Müller-Brockmann, Hans Neuburg, Richard Paul Lohse, and Carlo Vivarelli in Zurich on 15 February 1958. The publication's formation was catalyzed by the "Konstruktive Grafik" exhibition at the Zurich Kunstgewerbemuseum, in which the designers had participated.

=== Content ===
Central to the journal was the conception of the designer as an individual endowed with a great deal of social responsibility. With the authority to effectively communicate ideas, the founders held, came responsibility to uphold values and justice. The journal was also known for advocating the use of photography as a central element in graphic design.

=== Criticism ===
Neue Grafik was decried by a number of critics, particularly in Zurich, who characterized the International Typographic Style as rigid and cold.
