= André Evard =

Swiss painter (1876–1972)

- Born: 1 June 1876; Renan, Switzerland
- Died: 20 July 1972 (aged 96); Le Locle, Switzerland
- Known for: Constructive art

Jean André Evard (1 June 1876 – 20 July 1972) was a Swiss painter and drafter. His special significance lies in the field of constructive art. He is counted among the first artists who did not work figuratively. In the course of his life he produced hundreds of oil paintings, a large number of drawings as well as approximately 2000 to 3000 watercolor and gouache paintings.

== Biography ==
André Evard was born on 1 June 1876 in Renan (Bernese Jura) as the son of Jean-Félix Evard (1849–1879) and Marie Sagne (1852–1921). After the early death of his father, he and his mother moved to La Chaux-de-Fonds, where Marie Evard ran a pastry shop. Initially working as a pastry chef, André received an inheritance which enabled him to study art. He studied at the École d'Art in La Chaux-de-Fonds from 1905 to 1909 and attended courses in decorative art with Charles L'Eplattenier, a former student of Ferdinand Hodler. Through L'Eplattenier, La Chaux-de-Fonds became a centre of Art Nouveau in Switzerland. He was particularly interested in the nature of the Jura and encouraged his pupils to "[...] study the nature of the Jura – from the fir trees to the tectonics of the limestone cliffs – analyse their regularities and translate them into abstract ornaments" (in German: [...] die Natur des Juras – von den Tannen bis zur Tektonik der Kalkfelsen – zu studieren, deren Regelmässigkeiten zu analysieren und in abstrakte Ornamente zu übertragen.}

Here André Evard distinguished himself above all in the goldsmith and enamel art with the finest works, which is why the art critic Jean-Marie Nussbaum labeled him a jeweller of painting. At that time Evard was artistically still strongly influenced by Art Nouveau. Among his friends at university were Le Corbusier, Conrad Meili and Léon Perrin, with whom he decorated and painted private villas. With Le Corbusier, for example, he furnished the interiors of the Villa Fallet in La Chaux-de-Fonds.

Around 1900 Evard got in touch with Paul Pettavel, a priest in La Chaux-de-Fonds who published a free Sunday newspaper, "La Feuille du dimanche", in which he propagated social reformist and pacifist ideas. The weekly also focused on the fight against alcoholism. La Chaux-de-Fonds was then a centre of international pacifism. Evard became a member of the Christian Youth Association of the pastor and administered the publication of the weekly newspaper for almost 30 years. Through his activities at Pettavel he got to know the painter Louis Reguin, whose daughter he married in 1928.

Around the year 1907 Evard shifted his artistic interest almost completely to painting and drawing and in the same year undertook a longer study trip to Italy, where he studied the old Masters. Above all, small-format portraits and atmospheric landscapes were the main characteristics of the works of the following years. His first collages were made in 1908, but they met with strong rejection. The participation in various exhibitions, such as 1909 in Munich or 1914 in Neuchâtel, did not lead to any success either. The result was a deep creative crisis and a complete reorientation. Thus from 1913 he undertook the first non-objective, cubist and constructive attempts, which were ultimately to place him in the front rank not only of the Swiss avant-garde. More and more he devoted himself to the principle of the series (an example of this is the painting series Roses), because he was fascinated by the variations of a basic motif and its color variations.

From 1912 until the end of World War I, André Evard used the name "Louvrier" as a pseudonym.

After the death of his mother longer stays in Paris followed from 1923 to 1927, during which he again dealt intensively with the old and modern masters and got to know artists like Georges Braque, Robert Delaunay and Theo van Doesburg, who tried in vain to win him for cooperation in the 'De Stijl' group

In addition, he came into contact with African sculpture for the first time, which increased his interest in non-European art. Since then he has attached particular importance to black – for him the aristocrat of colors. Some of his abstract, cubist and constructive works created during these Parisian years were exhibited at the Salon des Indépendants and the Salon d'Automne. Although André Evard was now at the center of the avant-garde, he responded to requests from the art trade by rejecting them and almost never gave his works to galleries or collectors. He sought recognition almost exclusively in the context of official institutions.

Back in La Chaux de Fonds, he married Milca Reguin, the daughter of the painter Louis Reguin in 1928. The following year was a huge one: Due to the Wall Street crash of 1929 he lost his entire fortune. Until the end of his life he now lived in modest circumstances. It was no longer possible to travel to Paris. His sphere of influence was thus limited to his homeland, which he had never left since. Moreover, his avant-garde works were not in demand among conservative audiences. At first he resignedly stopped his production, but from 1932 he changed his style in order to increase the chances of a sale. In addition to other Concrete works, a multitude of traditionally figurative, almost deserted landscapes and still lifes were created, characterized by strong colors: "La Chaux-de-Fonds lies at around 1,000 metres above sea level and is therefore one of the highest cities in Europe. From this altitude, Evard was particularly fascinated by the spectacle of light during sunrises and sunsets. The steep valley flanks (Côtes du Doubs) are densely wooded and partly crossed by rocky outcrops" (in German: La Chaux-de-Fonds liegt auf rund 1.000 Meter über dem Meeresspiegel und ist damit eine der höchstgelegenen Städte Europas. Von eben dieser Höhe aus war Evard besonders von dem Lichtschauspiel fasziniert, das sich ihm während der Sonnenauf- bzw. untergänge bot. Die steilen Talflanken (Côtes du Doubs) sind dicht bewaldet und teilweise mit Felsbändern durchzogen.}

Evard participated in various exhibitions, such as the 1936 exhibition 'Zeitprobleme in der Schweizer Malerei und Plastik' at the Kunsthaus Zürich. In 1937 he also joined the newly founded group Allianz as member no. 10, which offered a platform to avant-garde artists and in which important representatives of abstract and surrealist art participated. But here, too, he did not make use of the advantages of the group, which also met with little public interest in his home country. Since official Swiss art was based on traditional tastes, it became almost impossible to obtain a public contract. Thus Evard slowly fell into oblivion and increasingly withdrew into a self-imposed isolation. His art constantly changed back and forth between a figurative and an abstract style. The numerous landscapes and still lifes were characterized by strong colors, in which his pantheistic vision of nature is expressed. Many sunsets and colourful Jura landscapes were created. Shortly before his death in 1972, he completed his last work – a triumphantly luminous cross. André Evard was largely forgotten until today.

In 1978 the collector Jürgen A. Messmer acquired a large part of the works of André Evard's estate and has since made them known through exhibitions in the Kunsthalle Messmer. Since 2007, the Kunsthalle has been awarding the International André Evard Award for Concrete and Constructivist Contemporary Art every 2–3 years, which is endowed with 10,000 euros.

== Artistic work ==
After completing his studies, Evard initially painted in the French tradition of the late 19th and early 20th centuries. Influences of Salon paintings, Impressionism and symbolism were mixed with influences Vincent van Gogh, but also with those of Far Eastern art, whereby the various artist's styles seemed to merge into a very individual style. In his color compositions, Evard knew how to subject completely opposite colors to absolute harmony. Extreme freedom of feeling, great variety of moods, subtle color modulations and chromatic vivacity characterise his works, as Evard wants to give color its 'spirit'.

Step by step he finally detaches himself from the given ornamental or symbolizing forms and reaches the structure via the ornament. In works such as Crocus, Roses, Roses noir, Chardon, Nocturne or Pyramid, for example, the emphasis is on a limited three-dimensional, physical or spatially geometric drawing. The paintings of the 20s are reminiscent of Wassily Kandinsky, Juan Gris and Georges Braque. Again, however, he seems to unite all influences in his very own style.

The series of works called Roses are a prime example of the development from representational to constructive painting. Thus, in 1917, the Trois roses, the first version of the motif was created, to which he would devote himself for over a decade. For the first time, the tendency towards variation and an almost obsessive way of working becomes visible: sometimes he barely noticeably changes the colours, sometimes he changes the whole composition. The increasing abstraction of the natural object takes place here in an exemplary manner – from Cubism to constructivism. While a certain trueness to color is important to him at first, he gradually abandons it, separates himself from the colors and inserts vertical and horizontal lines into the picture, so that the depicted object can almost be seen as a pure geometric form. Evard reduces the representationalism through spatial and surface tensions – but achieves emotional values such as warm and cold, light and dark, playful and harsh through the choice of color.

André Evard's work is difficult to classify in the categories of art history. He was not committed to any particular style, but rather reverted to the past, mixed styles and invented something new. Art Nouveau, Cubism, and geometric-constructive abstractions all define his work. While in Paris he was part of the avant-garde, he later repeatedly withdrew to representational painting.

On the one hand, the play of forms and colors leads to highly expressive representational landscapes, on the other hand, fascinating still lifes emerge from the clear reduction, which show unusual color combinations and completely new object-space relationships. In doing so, he always exposed himself to the risk of a stylistic break, which, however, is the special feature of his artistic oeuvre. He painted abstract when hardly anyone painted abstract and returned to representational painting when Abstract art dominated.

== Works online ==
- Decorative project for living room. La Chaux-de-Fonds 1908.
- Analysis of a painting: André Evard

== Exhibitions (selection) ==
- 1936: Zeitprobleme in der Schweizer Malerei und Plastik (Temporal problems in Swiss painting and sculpture), Kunsthaus Zürich, Zürich, Switzerland
- 1981: 1936 – eine Konfrontation (1936 – A Confrontation), Kunsthaus Aarau, Switzerland
- 1981: Konstruktive Kunst in der Schweiz 1915-1945 (Constructive Art in Switzerland 1915-1945), Kunstmuseum Winterthur, Switzerland
- 1993: Kunstmuseum Olten Olten, Switzerland
- 2005: André Evard. De l´Art nouveau a l´abstraction (André Evard. From Art Nouveau to abstraction), Musée des beaux-arts, La Chaux-de-Fonds, Switzerland
- 2009: Hommage an André Evard, Kunsthalle Messmer, Riegel am Kaiserstuhl, Germany
- 2012: Le Corbusier & André Evard. Vom Jugendstil zur Moderne (Le Corbusier & André Evard. From Art Nouveau to Modernism), Kunsthalle Messmer, Riegel am Kaiserstuhl, Germany
- 2016 André Evard: Der Farbe ihren Geist geben. 1876 bis 1972 (André Evard: Giving color its spirit. 1876 to 1972), Galerie Michael Schultz, Berlin, Germany
- 2018 André Evard: Farben der Natur (André Evard: Colors of nature), Galerie Messmer, Riegel am Kaiserstuhl, Germany
- 2019 10 Jahre Kunsthalle Messmer: Ein Leben für die Kunst (10 Years Kunsthalle Messmer: A Life for Art), Kunsthalle Messmer, Riegel am Kaiserstuhl, Germany
