= Tos Chirathivat =

Thai businessman (born 1964)

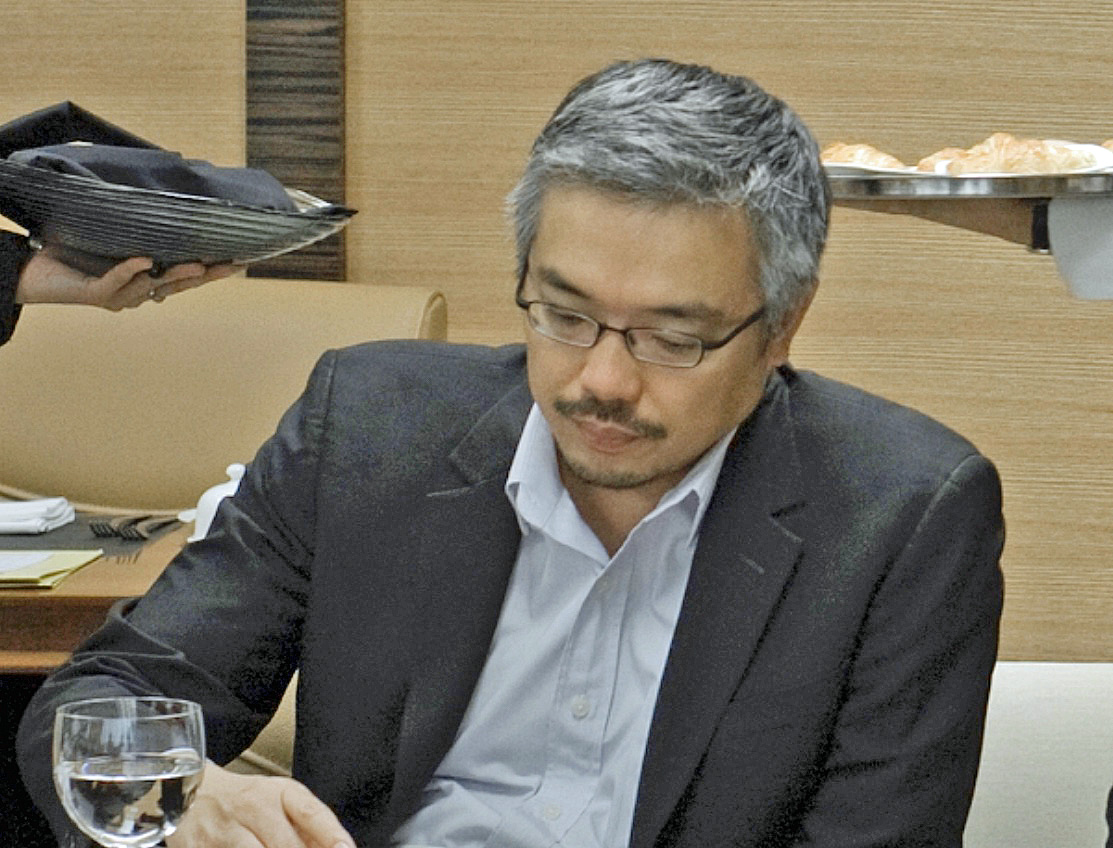
- Born: 23 December 1964 (age 61)
- Occupation: Businessperson
- Title: Central Group (CEO and Chairman)
- Spouse: Sookta Chirathivat
- Father: Samrit Chirathivat
- Family: Chirathivat family

Tos Chirathivat 鄭昌 (born 23 November 1964) is the executive chairman and chief executive officer (CEO) of the Central Group and head of one of Thailand's leading family business groups. The Central Group owns more than 100 department stores and shopping malls. It also operates hotels and restaurants, with a total of 5,000 outlets. He and his family are among the richest families in Thailand.

== Family ==
Tos comes from the well-known Chirathivat clan. His grandfather, Tiang, was a member of Thailand's commercially prominent Thai-Chinese community and founded the Central Group in 1947. His father, Samrit, served as chairman of the Central Group for 21 years and opened the first shopping center in Thailand in 1957.

Tos, born in 1964, is the youngest of eight children. Growing up, he was very quiet and considered designing cars as a profession. He and his close-knit family lived on a 12-house compound in Bangkok.

== Education ==
Tos studied at various institutions in the US: one year at a private school in Miami.; earned an economics degree from Wesleyan University in Connecticut in 1985 and received his MBA from Columbia University in New York in 1988.

== Career ==
Tos became CEO of the Central Group on 29 November 2013. From 2002 through 2013, Tos was CEO of Central Retailing, the group’s retail-development arm. In this role, Tos focused on international expansion. The company opened three department stores in China in 2010 and 2011. They also made several key acquisitions in Europe, purchasing the Italian retailer La Rinascente in 2011, the Illum department store in Copenhagen, and Germany's KaDeWe. The joint venture Signa announced insolvency in November 2023. International operations now account for roughly 30 percent of group revenue.

Tos Chirathivat also served in several executive director roles at Big C Super Center, Robinson Department Store, and B2S Company Ltd. He briefly worked at Citibank after university.

== Personal life ==
He and his wife Sookta have 2 sons.
