= Kunsthalle Messmer =

Museum in Baden-Württemberg, Germany

Coordinates: 48.148520°N 7.753811°E

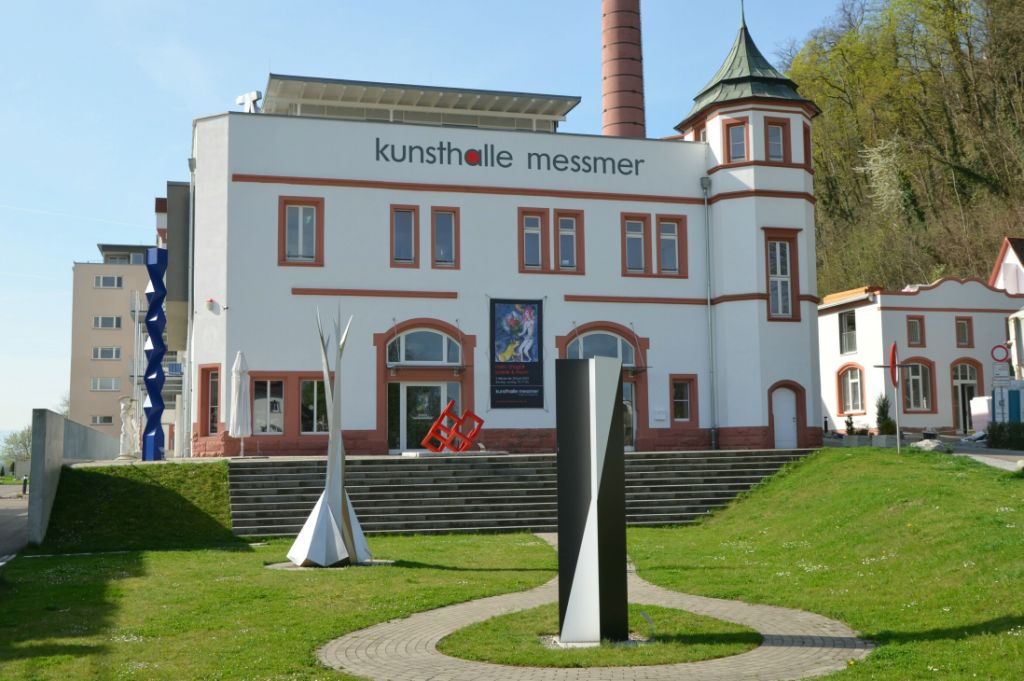
Kunsthalle Messmer

The Kunsthalle Messmer is a museum in Riegel am Kaiserstuhl in the rooms of the former Riegeler Brauerei. Art of the 20th and 21st centuries is shown in temporary exhibitions on around 900 m^{2} of exhibition space. The museum includes an 850 m^{2} sculpture garden with plastics by contemporary artists Gerald Baschek, Hellmut Bruch, Gerhard Frömel, Friedrich Geiler, Bernhard Licini, Rüdiger Seidt, Michel Jouët and Michael Schwarze.

== Foundation ==
In 2005, the former entrepreneur and art collector Jürgen A. Messmer founded the messmer foundation as a dedication to his daughter Petra, who died of cancer in 2003. The foundation is the institution behind the museum, which opened in June 2009. Every year, up to three exhibitions of classical modern art and contemporary art are presented. Exhibits from its own collection as well as loans from international private and museum collections are on display. In 1978, Messmer succeeded in acquiring large parts of the estate of the Swiss artist André Evard. Throughout his life, he painted figuratively and abstractly and was regarded as a pioneering painter of Swiss Modernism.

Through the artist, the entrepreneur found concrete-constructive art, which today forms the focus of his collection. The first exhibition of the kunsthalle messmer was a homage to Evard and showed only his works. In addition, the International André Evard Art Award, founded by Messmer, was named to honour the artist.

== Exhibitions (selection) ==
In addition to the estate of André Evard, the Messmer art collection includes works by Max Bill, Georges Braque, Salvador Dalí, Otto Dix, Günter Fruhtrunk, François Morellet, A. R. Penck, Pablo Picasso, Gerd Grimm, Sonia Delaunay, Joan Miró and Victor Vasarely. Including these works, the museum has presented the following exhibitions, among others:

- 2009: Hommage an André Evard (Hommage to André Evard)
- 2009: Victor Vasarely + 50 Jahre konstruktive Kunst in Paris (Victor Vasarely + 50 years of constructive art in Paris)
- 2010: Gruppenausstellung der Nominierten zum 2. Internationalen André Evard-Preis (Group exhibition of the nominees for the 2nd International André Evard Art Award)
- 2010: Salvador Dalí und die Allmacht des Traumes (Salvador Dalí and the omnipotence of the dream)
- 2010: Gerd Grimm – Mode, Mädchen, Metropolen (Gerd Grimm - Fashion, Girls, Metropolises)
- 2011: Kinetik – Kunst in Bewegung (Kinetics – Art in Motion)
- 2011: Wasser – Facetten eines Elements (Water - facets of an element)
- 2012: Le Corbusier und André Evard – Vom Jugendstil zur Moderne (Le Corbusier and André Evard - From Art Nouveau to Modernism)
- 2013: Marc Chagall – Poesie und Traum (Marc Chagall - Poetry and dream)
- 2013: Gruppenausstellung der Nominierten zum 3. Internationalen André Evard-Preis (Group exhibition of the nominees for the 3nd International André Evard Art Award)
- 2014: Ernst Fuchs und Friedensreich Hundertwasser (Ernst Fuchs and Friedensreich Hundertwasser)
- 2014: China im Spiegel der Zeit (China in the reflection of time)
- 2015: Andy Warhol King of Pop Art
- 2016: Gruppenausstellung der Nominierten zum 4. Internationalen André-Evard-Preis (Group exhibition of the nominees for the 4nd International André Evard Art Award)
- 2016 Joan Miró - Der leidenschaftliche Malerpoet (Joan Miró - The passionate painter poet)
- 2017: Christo and Jeanne-Claude: Objekte – Zeichnungen – Fotos (Christo and Jeanne-Claude: Objects - Drawings - Photos)
- 2017: Picasso und die Frauen (Picasso and the women)
- 2017: Licht & Bewegung (Light & Movement)
- 2018: Otmar Alt: Lebenswege (Otmar Alt: Life paths)
- 2018: Dalí – Der Zauber des Genies (Dalí – the Magic of the Genius
- 2019: Hundert Jahre Bauhaus (One hundred years of Bauhaus)
- 2018: Gruppenausstellung der Nominierten zum 5. Internationalen André-Evard-Preis (Group exhibition of the nominees for the 5nd International André Evard Art Award)
- 2019: 10 Jahre Kunsthalle Messmer – Ein Leben für die Kunst (10 Years of Kunsthalle Messmer - A Life for Art)

== Gallery Messmer ==
In 2013, Jürgen A. Messmer expanded the Kunsthalle to include a commercial gallery in the historic columned room of the former brewery, which sees itself as a platform for young artists. The programme includes works from the fields of concrete-constructive art and figurative painting or sculpture.
