= Max Burchartz =

German photographer

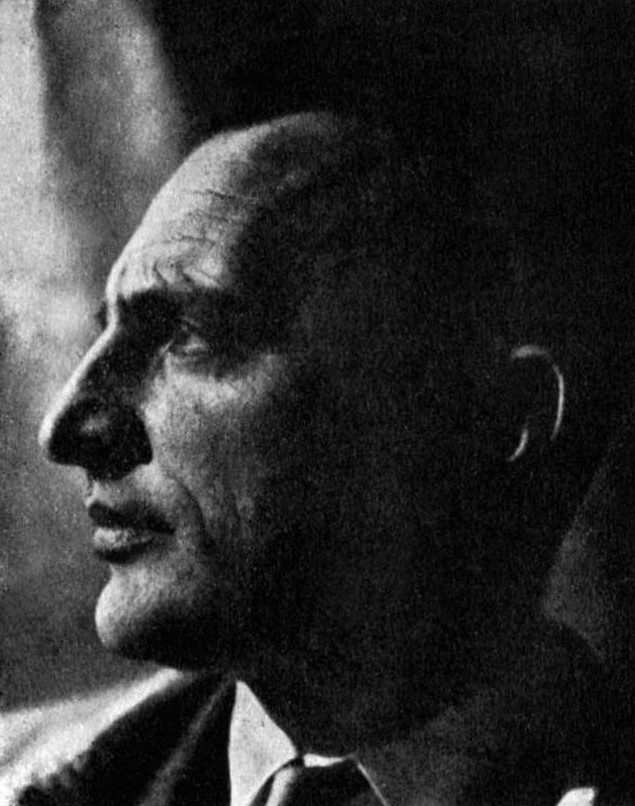
- Born: 28 July 1887; Elberfeld, Germany
- Died: 31 January 1961 (aged 73); Essen, Germany
- Occupation: Photographer

Max Hubert Innocenz Maria Burchartz (1887–1961) was a German painter, typographer, photographer, commercial art designer, and graphic arts teacher.

== Life ==
Max Burchartz was the son of a fabric manufacturer, Otto Burchartz and his wife Maria. After his basic schooling he received training in his father's weaving mill and studied at a textile technical school as well as an art school. He studied advertising and art and in 1907 started studying at an art academy in Düsseldorf, at that time experimenting with impressionism but left the academy to join the First World War. After the War he withdrew to Blankenhain and resumed painting. His paintings reflected the quiet, rural life of Blankenhain, but maintained abstract influences, (e.g. Strasse in Blankenhain).

== Meeting with the modern trend ==
From 3 to 5 August 1922 Burchartz attended a still-life course taught by Theo van Doesburg at the Bauhaus in Weimar, a break from his past work and turned him toward the 'modern trend', which was from then on expressed in a constructional style. He also worked as a translator.

== Ascent into the Ruhr District ==
In 1924 Burchartz moved to the Ruhr District where he set up the first modern advertising agency in Germany with Johannes Canis on 1 November 1924. He dedicated himself to the new typography and color design of the building. Artistic and economic success soon followed. The first customer of the agency was the Bochumer association. Burchartz developed a new layout style that blended typography, photography, and photo collages.

In 1926 Burchartz began expanding his artistic career. His subject matter grew and he began to sketch furniture along with his previous subjects. He also began working for the German Work Federation and became an active journalist. Burchartz began working for a company called Wehag that made door handles and fittings. He created many drafts for the company and shaped the development of the enterprise.

In April 1927, Burchartz finally received a degree in typography at the Folkwang Schule. Later that year he joined the architect Alfred Fischer, who built churches and the Hans Sachs house. Burchartz developed a color control system for the corridors of the house and thereby created the (presumed) first example of applied Signaletic in a public building. In other words, each floor is assigned one of the primary colors and labelled 'red floor, green floor, etc...'. After World War II they were painted over and forgotten and the style was not 'rediscovered' until the 90's.

== The Third Reich ==
After Hitler seized power, Burchartz joined the Nazi Party, hoping to regain his position at the Folkwang Hochschule. During this time, he made many trips for his photography and made prints of industrial subject matter. (e.g. 1933 Sailors Soldiers Comrades). Between 1933 and 1939 Burchartz worked for the Forkardt company for whom he sketched "the Book of Stretching" in 1939. The book was an opinion book about "Handspannfutter". Between 1935 and 1936 he also sketched folders for the Donar company, which, like the Wehag company, made door handles. He voluntarily joined the German army which he remained in until the end of the war. At the end of the war he found himself in Paris.

== A New Start ==
In 1949, Burchartz began working at the Folkwang Academy as a professor for the first year students. He taught the students universal art ideas and the ideas of holistic designs. In 1953 he wrote his first work of art theory, "Allegory of the Harmony" and also an extension of the piece, "Design Theory". In this time he also created collages and framed developed with new materials such as raster foils, plastic foils, Resopal, and wall carpets. On 31 January 1961 Max Burchartz died. A year after his death a book of his surfaced, titled "School of Looking".

== Influence on art today ==
Although Burchartz can be considered the pioneer of modern design and can be compared to older artists such as Peter Behrens and Anton Stankowski, he never received the same fame. Many of today's communication designs, such as the color control system, are based on the work of Max Burchartz.
