= Richard Paul Lohse =

Swiss artist (1902–1988)

- Born: 13 September 1902; Zurich
- Died: 16 September 1988 (aged 86); Zurich
- Resting place: Cemetery Sihlfeld
- Occupations: Painter, printmaker, lithographer, graphic designer, sculptor, typographer
- Spouse: Irmgard Micaela Burchard
- Awards: Sikkens Prize (1971)

Richard Paul Lohse (September 13, 1902 – September 16, 1988) was a Swiss painter and graphic artist and one of the main representatives of the concrete and constructive art movements.

== Life ==
Lohse was born in Zürich in 1902. His wish to study in Paris was thwarted due to his difficult economic circumstances. In 1918, he joined the advertising agency Max Dalang, where he trained to become an advertising designer. Lohse, then an autodidact, painted expressive, late-cubist still lifes.

In the 1930s, his work as a graphic artist and book designer placed him among the pioneers of modern Swiss graphic design; in paintings of this period, he worked on curved and diagonal constructions. Success eventually allowed him to establish his own graphic design studio in Zürich.

He combined art with a political and moral awareness, which led him to be an activist for immigrants. In the 1930s, he was actively involved in protests, which were illegal under the government of the time. He continued to protest until the beginning of World War II.

In 1937, Lohse co-founded Allianz, an association of Swiss modern artists, with Leo Leuppi. Through this organization, he became a colleague of Anna Indermaur. In 1938, he helped Irmgard Burchard, to whom he was married for a brief time, to organise the London exhibition "Twentieth Century German Art". His political convictions then led him into the resistance movement, where he met his future wife Ida Alis Dürner.

The year 1943 marked a breakthrough in Lohse's painting: he standardised the pictorial means and started to develop modular and serial systems. In 1953, he published the book New Design in Exhibitions, and from 1958, he became co-editor of the magazine Neue Grafik.

Lohse's typical classic paintings are nonrepresentational, systematic, two-dimensional laminar planes of interacting colour elements in various logical/mathematical relations visible to the eye, using the structure of colour that we perceive, and in a way that every element plays an equal qualitative role.

In Lohse's modular works, a basic geometric form is systematically transformed through repetition, rotation, enlargement, or other variations. His serial works arrange colours in predetermined sequences that create rhythmic compositions through systematic ordering.

He died in Zürich in 1988.

== Timeline ==
- 1902 Born 13 September in Zürich
- 1917 First realistic paintings
- 1918 Apprentice in graphic design at Max Dalang AG (until 1922); studies at the Kunstgewerbeschule Zürich under Ernst Keller
- 1922 Employed in the advertising studio of Max Dalang AG, where he meets Hans Neuburg and Anton Stankowski
- 1925 Still lifes, landscapes, cubist experimental paintings
- 1930 Establishes his own graphic design studio in Zürich (1931–1934 with former Dalang co-worker Hans Trommer)
- 1933 Political support for émigrés; illegal political activities until end of World War II;co-founder of the Association of Independent Graphic Designers; begins graphic design work for landscape architect Walter Mertens (until 1944)
- 1934 Studio and apartment in the Zett-Haus, Zürich, together with artist and gallerist Irmgard Burchard; member of the association Friends of New Architecture
- 1935 Curvations
- 1936 Marriage to Irmgard Burchard (born 1908 in Zürich, died 1964 in Cairo); participates in the exhibition "Zeitprobleme in der Schweizer Malerei", Kunsthaus Zürich
- 1937 Co-founder and vice-chairman of Allianz, Association of Modern Swiss Artists; constructions
- 1938 Collaboration for the exhibition "Twentieth Century German Art", New Burlington Galleries, London, initiated by Irmgard Burchard; installs a print exhibition of German and Russian constructivists in Zürich; begins book design work for Büchergilde Gutenberg (until 1954)
- 1939 Divorce from Irmgard Burchard; collaboration for the Swiss national exhibition "Landi", Zürich; begins graphic design work for turbine builder Escher Wyss (until 1969)
- 1940 May: Destroys political documents and graphic design works; sketches ideas of diagonal, vertical and horizontal structures; co-editor and book designer of Almanac of New Art in Switzerland
- 1942 Marriage to Ida Alis Dürner (born 1907 in Uttwil, died 1989 in Zürich); summer: Ida Alis travels to the camp in Gurs (France) to support persecuted people; member of the Swiss Werkbund; standardisation of the pictorial means: additive vertical series, objective rhythmic, serial structure systems, quantitative colour equality; participates in the exhibition "Allianz", Kunsthaus Zürich
- 1943 First modular and serial systems
- 1944 Birth of daughter Johanna; works on the publications abstrakt/konkret and Plan; participates in the exhibition "Concrete Art", Kunsthalle, Basel
- 1946 Group thematics; book design for Carola Giedion-Welcker, Poètes à l'Ecart – Anthologie der Abseitigen
- 1947 Organises with Leo Leuppi the exhibition "Concrete, Abstract, Surrealist Art in Switzerland", Kunstmuseum St. Gallen; participates in the exhibition "Abstract and Concrete Art", Palazzo Exreale, Milano; designer and editor of the architectural review Bauen+Wohnen / Building+Home (until 1956); begins graphic design work for Wohnbedarf (until 1968)
- 1948 Organiser of the Swiss section in the Salon des Réalités Nouvelles, Paris (also 1950); participates in the exhibition "Tendencies in Abstract Art", Galerie Denise René, Paris; "Interrelations between Art and Architecture", a didactic concept for the Architecture Department of the Swiss Federal Institute of Technology, Zürich
- 1949 Swiss Prize for Painting; attends the CIAM conference, Bergamo
- 1951 Organises with Sigfried Giedion the Swiss section at the "International Water Color Exhibition" Brooklyn, New York; participates in the 1st Biennale, São Paulo; book design for Sigfried Giedion, CIAM – A Decade of New Architecture; at the 9th Triennale, Milano the review Bauen+Wohnen is awarded the prize "Compasso d'Oro"
- 1952 "World Exhibition of Photography", Lucerne – thematic design of the sections Art & Photography and Architecture & Photography
- 1953 Author and book designer of New Design in Exhibitions; contributes to the review spirale
- 1954 Founding member of the artists' and architects' association espace, groupe suisse; leading positions in the Swiss Werkbund (until 1966)
- 1957 Mural Three equal themes in five colours for the Swiss Pavilion at the 11th Milan Triennale, architect Alfred Roth (mural now in the Swiss Federal Institute of Technology, Zürich); first one-person exhibition, Club Bel Etage, Zürich
- 1958 Edits the review Neue Grafik / New Graphic Design, Olten, with Josef Müller-Brockmann, Hans Neuburg and Carlo Vivarelli (until 1965)
- 1959 Editor of publication Friedrich Vordemberge-Gildewart on the occasion of his 60th birthday
- 1960 Retrospective exhibition, Kunstverein Ulm
- 1961 Retrospective exhibition, Stedelijk Museum, Amsterdam
- 1962 Member of the Exhibition Commission of the Kunsthaus, Zürich (until 1970)
- 1964 Mural Horizontal rhythm of two themes at the Wier housing estate, Ebnat-Kappel, architect Thomas Schmid
- 1965 Represents Switzerland at the 8th Biennale in São Paulo
- 1967 Wall design Four revolving door elements, Paradies-Lenggis school, Jona-Rapperswil, architect Kurt Federer (extended to eight elements in 1971)
- 1968 Participates in the documenta 4, Kassel
- 1969 Assists in the creation of the McCrory Corporation Collection, New York (until 1975)
- 1971 Sikkens Prize of the Netherlands; one-person exhibition, Moderna Museet, Stockholm
- 1972 Represents Switzerland at the 36th Biennale, Venezia
- 1973 Art Prize of the City of Zürich. With the prize money of 12,000 Swiss Francs, Lohse acquires works by 13 young Swiss constructive artists and donates them to the Kunsthaus Zürich; monograph Richard Paul Lohse, DuMont, Köln
- 1975 Appeal to the French Minister of Culture, André Malraux, for the renovation of the Villa Savoie of Le Corbusier (with the SWB and BSA); exhibition "Modular and Serial Orders", Kunsthalle Düsseldorf (1976 Kunsthaus Zürich)
- 1977 "World Print Competition 77" prize, San Francisco; honorary member of "Group of Systematic-Constructive Art", Gorinchem, Netherlands
- 1978 Exhibition "9 Squares", Van Abbemuseum, Eindhoven, Netherlands
- 1982 Participates in the documenta 7, Kassel with Thematic series in 18 colours A, B and C; mural Complementary colour series for the reading room of the Canton Zürich State Archive, architects Jakob Schilling, Claudia Bersin; honoured by the City of Zürich on 80th birthday
- 1983 Appeal to Jack Lang, French Minister of Culture, for the renovation of the Aubette, Strasbourg
- 1986 One-person exhibition, Vienna Secession, and honorary member of the Vienna Secession
- 1987 Appointed Commander of the Order of Arts and Letters of the French Republic by the Minister of Culture, Jack Lang; honoured by the City of Zürich on his 85th birthday; establishes the Richard Paul Lohse Foundation, Zürich
- 1988 Painting Grenoble 1788, commissioned by the French State to commemorate the 200th anniversary of the French Revolution in Grenoble in 1788; retrospective exhibition at the Musée de Grenoble; died 16 September in Zürich
