= Leo Leuppi =

Swiss painter, graphic artist and sculptor

Leo Leuppi (1893–1972) was a Swiss painter, graphic artist, sculptor, and he was a representative of the Zürcher Schule der Konkreten. He was a founder of the avant-garde artists' associations Groupe Suisse Abstraction et Surréalisme and Allianz.

== Life ==
Leo Leuppi came from a peasant family with many children. From 1910 to 1914 he attended the class for graphic arts at the Kunstgewerbeschule in Zurich.

At the end of the First World War he made contact with the Dada movement and became friends with Jean Arp. In 1934 he founded the Groupe Suisse Abstraction et Surréalisme to help the modern art movements break through to cultural institutions. In 1936 Leuppi was presented progressive Swiss artists to the wider public for the first time with the exhibition Zeitprobleme in der Schweizer Malerei und Plastik.

In 1937, together with Richard Paul Lohse, he launched Die Allianz, an association of modern Swiss artists. After many exhibitions, in 1954 Leuppi resigned as president of Allianz. He was a colleague of Anna Indermaur, who was a member of both Die Allianz and Groupe Suisse Abstraction et Surréalisme.

From 1959 to 1960 Leuppi taught experimental design in the Fashion Department at the School of Applied Arts in Zurich.

In 1963 he gave up his studio on Mühlebachstrasse in Zurich and moved to Krankenheim Bombach, Höngg.

== Work ==
Leuppi was one of the most important pioneers of modern art in Switzerland. His ability to present Die Allianz, in which representatives of opposing art movements such as constructivism, concrete art and surrealism merged, was also reflected in his own work: combining the undogmatic style of constructive principles with surrealistic moments.

The cubism of Pablo Picasso, Georges Braque and Juan Gris led Leuppi to abstraction. From 1937 to 1947, his works were characterized by a constructive nature, where it differs from Max Bill, Sophie Taeuber-Arp.

Walter Bodmer and Jean Arp were inspired by his work.

Leuppi is also well known for his public artworks such as the iron sculpture on the façade of the Migros building in Thun (1955), the wall mosaic at Schulhaus Kolbenacker in Zürich (1955–57) and the mural in the entrance hall of Alterssiedlung Gsteigstrasse in Höngg (1956–57).
