= Carlo Vivarelli =

Swiss designer

- Born: 8 March 1919; Zürich, Switzerland
- Died: 1986 (aged 66–67); Zürich, Switzerland

Carlo Vivarelli (1919–1986) was a Swiss artist and graphic designer associated with the International Typographic Style.

Vivarelli was born on 8 March 1919 in Zürich, Switzerland.

Vivarelli began his design education studying in 1934 at the Kunstgewerbeschule Zürich. During this period, he also worked as an apprentice.

Following his early studies, Vivarelli moved to Paris, where he studied under French poster artist Paul Colin. In 1946, Vivarelli moved to Milan, where he worked as an art director at graphic design firm, Studio Boggeri. The following year, he returned to Zürich and opened his own firm. Vivarelli's studio was commissioned by a number of major clients including Electrolux, Roche, and SRG SSR.

In 1958 Vivarelli became a founding member of Neue Grafik, a Swiss design publication.

Carlo Vivarelli died in Zürich in 1986.

== Gallery ==
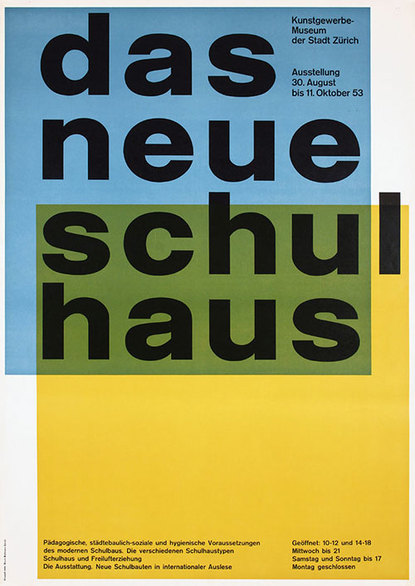
Das neue Schulhaus poster (1953)

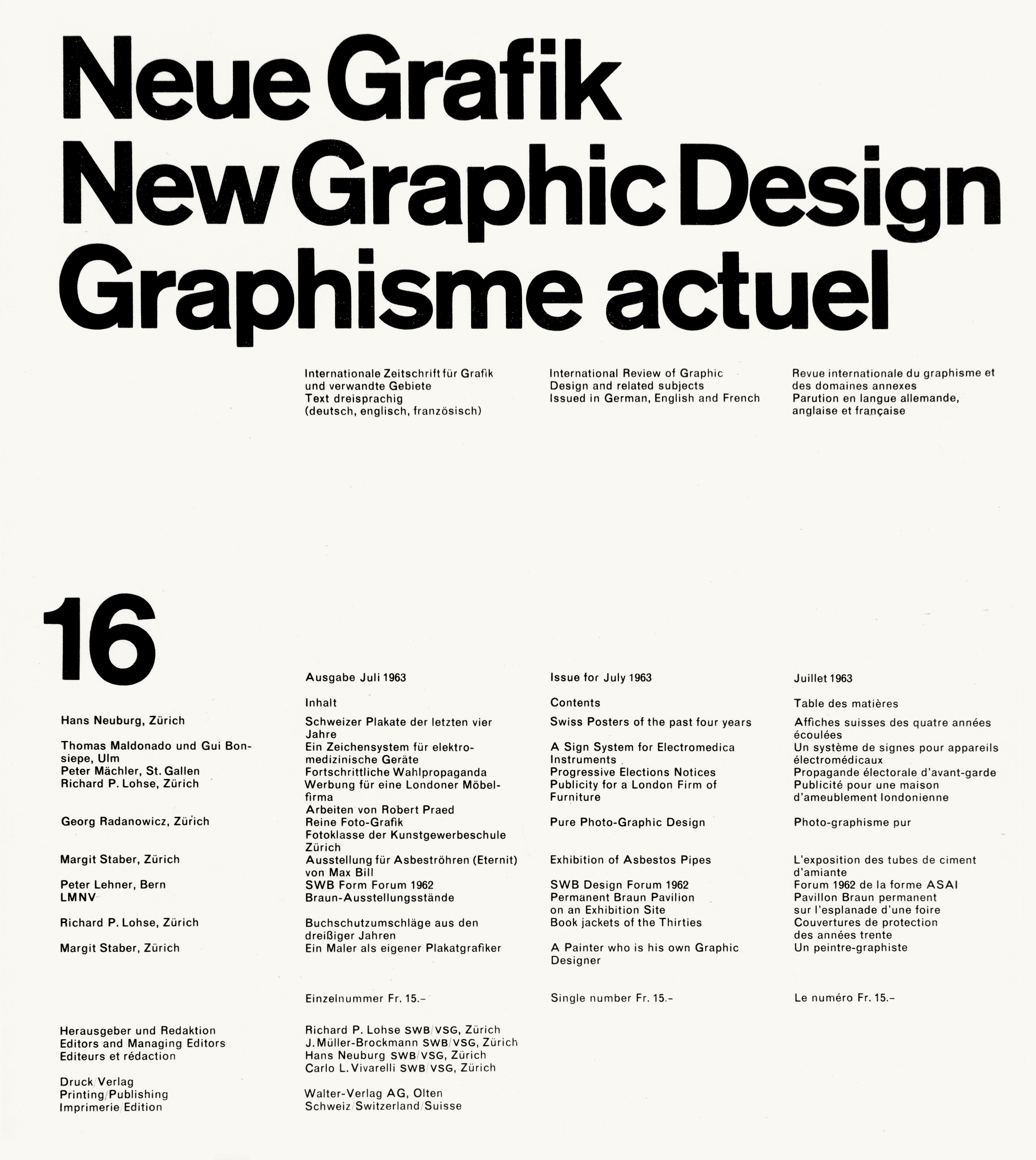
Neue Grafik layout (1958)

Electrolux logo design (1961)

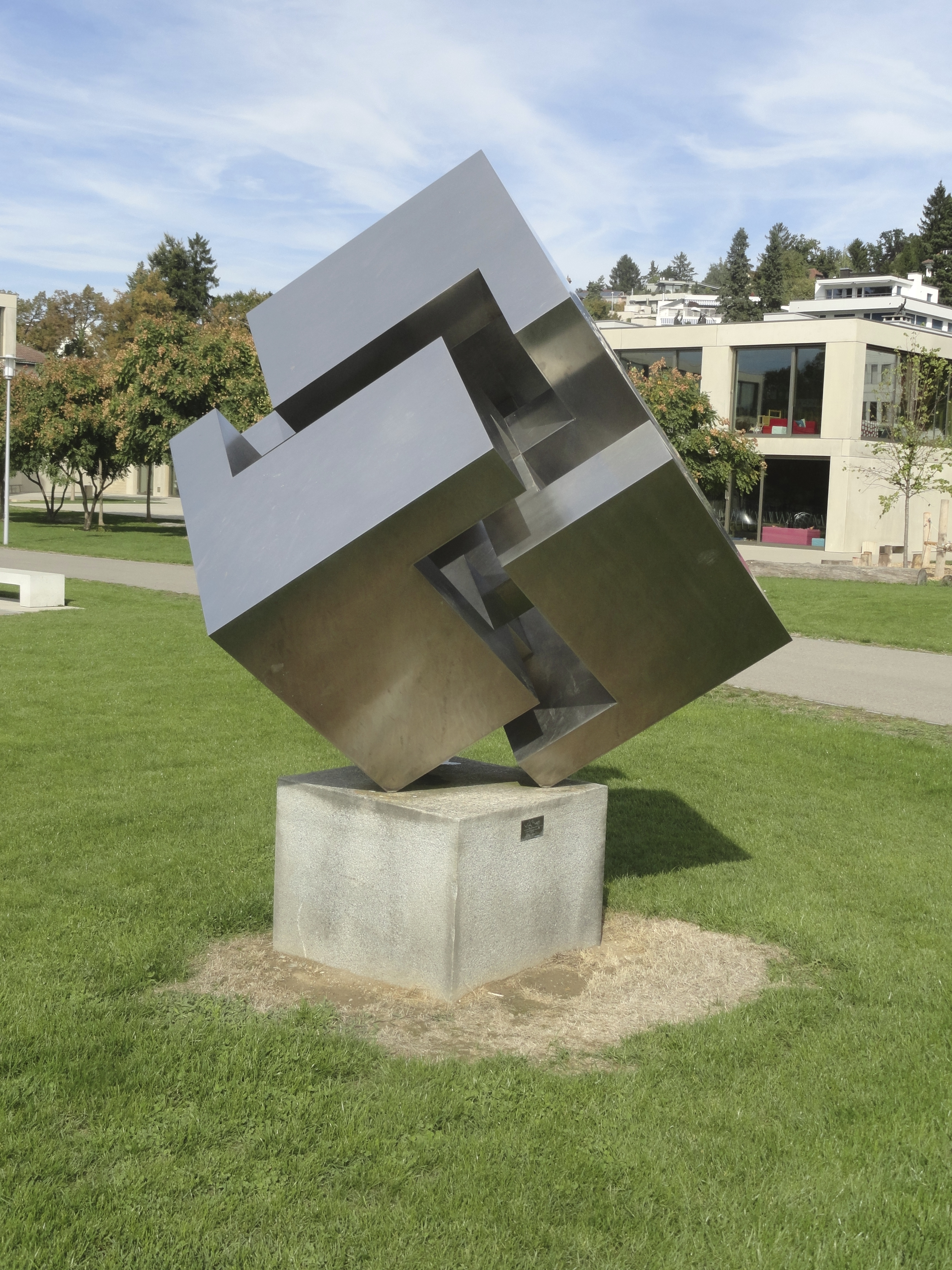
"Vier konkave und vier konvexe Raumecken" (1972)
