= Camille Graeser =

Swiss painter

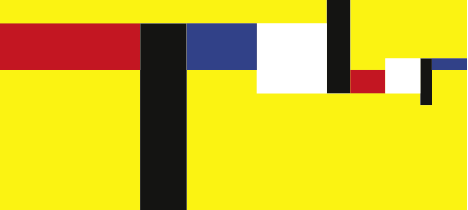
- Energie in der Reihe, 1952
- Born: February 27, 1892; Carouge
- Died: February 21, 1980 (aged 87); Wald, Zürich
- Style: Concrete art
- Website: http://www.camille-graeser-stiftung.ch

Camille Graeser (27 February 1892, Carouge – 21 February 1980, Wald) was a Swiss painter and member of the circle of Zurich Concrete artists. He was born in Switzerland but grew up in Stuttgart, Germany where he became a furniture designer. He took part in major exhibitions by the association Werkbund and in 1927 was invited to create furniture for Mies van der Rohe. In 1933 he fled to Switzerland as a result of the Nazis coming to power. He then became a member of the Swiss artists’ association Allianz.

== Works ==
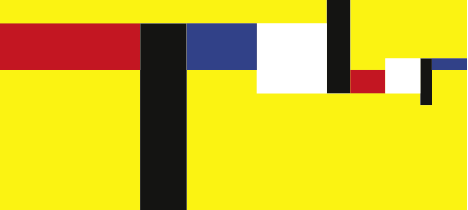
Schematic reproduction of "Energie in der Reihe" from 1952, 80 x 36 cm

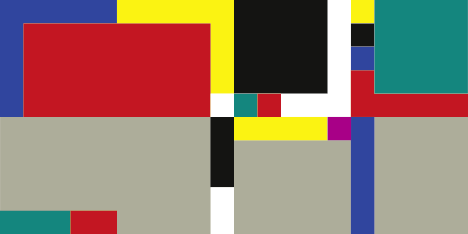
Schematic reproduction of "rhythmische Reduktion" from 1952, 80 x 40 cm

== Estate ==
The Camille Graeser Foundation was established in 1981, and is responsible for his artistic estate.

== Exhibitions ==
- 2020 — Camille Graeser, Museum Haus Konstruktiv
- 2019 — The Amory Show, Pier 94, Von Bartha
- 2016 — Camille Graeser und die Musik, Kunstmuseum Stuttgart
- 1985 — Contrasts of Form: Geometric Abstract Art, 1910–1980, The Museum of Modern Art

== Publications ==
- 1986 — Camille Graeser – Zeichnungen, Werkverzeichnis Band 1, Dieter Schwarz
- 1990 — Camille Graeser – Druckgraphik und Multiples, Werkverzeichnis Band 2, Stefan Paradowski
- 1995 — Camille Graeser – Bilder, Reliefs und Plastiken, Werkverzeichnis Band 3, Rudolf Koella
