= Hans Coray =

Swiss furniture designer (1906–1991)

- Born: 9 June 1906; Wald, Switzerland
- Died: 22 November 1991 (aged 85); Zurich, Switzerland
- Education: University of Zurich
- Occupations: Furniture designer, artist
- Known for: Landi chair

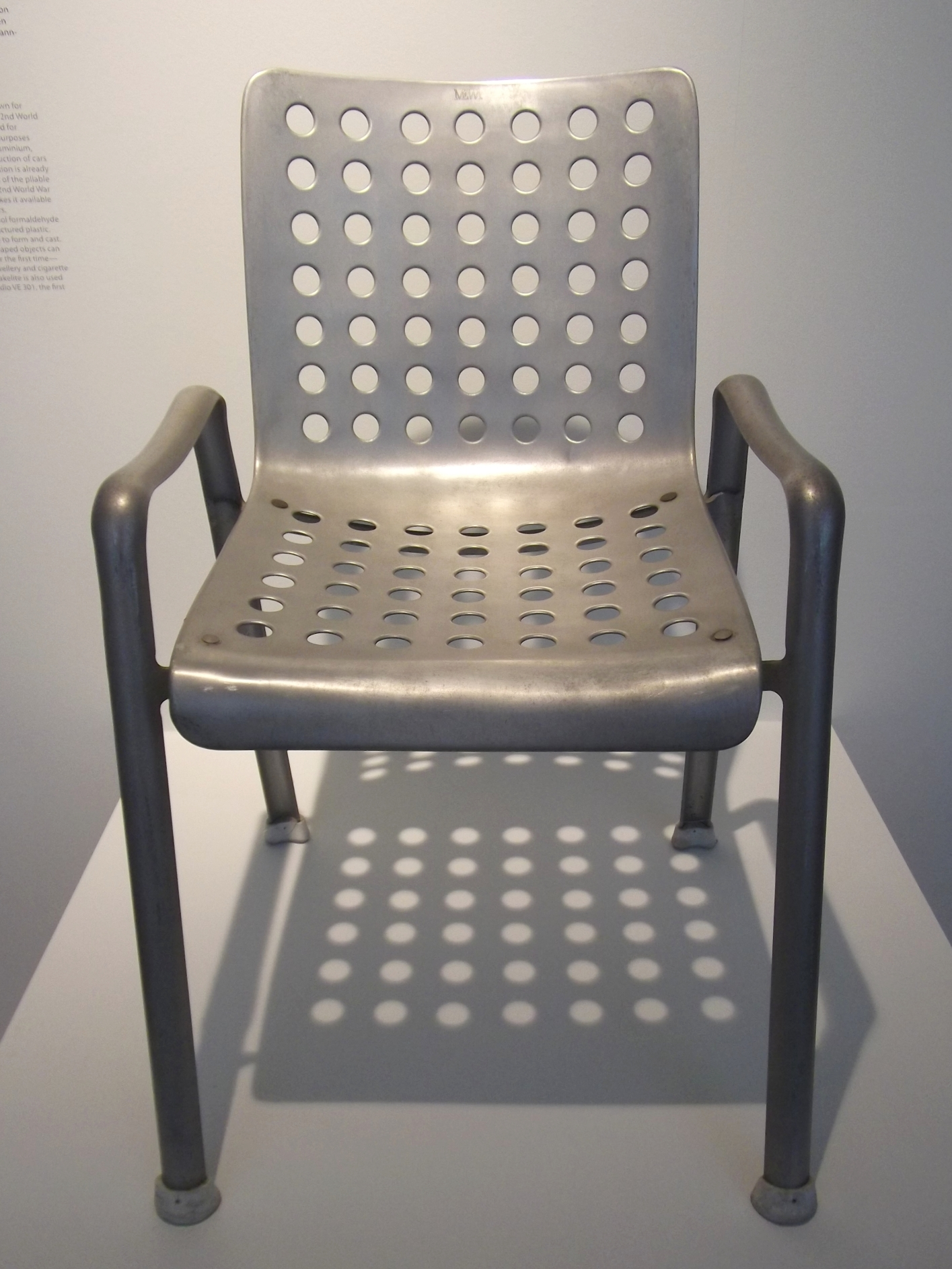
Landi chair, 1938 (Museum of Applied Art, Cologne)

Hans Coray (9 June 1906 – 22 November 1991) was a Swiss artist and furniture designer. He is best known for designing the Landi chair for the Swiss National Exhibition of 1939, a lightweight aluminium chair that became a classic of Swiss industrial design and is held in the collection of the Museum of Modern Art in New York. In addition to the Landi chair, Coray designed furniture for industrial production, including pieces for the line für den Wohnbedarf, and worked as a painter, sculptor and art dealer.

== Early life and education ==
Hans Coray was born on 9 June 1906 in Wald in the canton of Zurich and was originally from Sagogn in Graubünden. He was the son of Han Coray and Domenica Hössli.

Coray studied Romance languages at the University of Zurich and received a doctorate in 1929. In 1931 he worked as a middle-school teacher in Aarau and Zuoz and produced his first furniture designs. Between 1932 and 1938 he pursued further study in subjects including graphology, astrology, religious philosophy and design, and began work in metal design.

Coray died in Zurich on 22 November 1991.

== Design career ==
For the Swiss National Exhibition of 1939 he designed the official Landi chair, a stackable chair made of perforated aluminium sheet. The idea of creating an official chair for the exhibition originated with architect Hans Fischli. Coray won a competition in 1938 to design the chair, around 1500 examples of which were produced for use across the exhibition grounds. The chair later entered series production and was manufactured in a modified form from 1962 onward, and is included in collections such as the Museum of Modern Art (MoMA) in New York, and Museum of Applied Art (MAKK) in Cologne.

Coray subsequently designed numerous other products, including furniture for the line für den Wohnbedarf, such as a garden chair and the table “Ponton”. He was among the first Swiss designers to create furniture models intended for industrial production, particularly seating furniture.

From 1945 Coray worked as a designer, artist and art dealer.
