= Hans Neuburg =

Swiss art critic and designer

- Born: 20 March 1904; Králíky, Austria-Hungary (now Czech Republic)
- Died: 24 June 1983; Zürich, Switzerland

Hans Neuburg (20 March 1904 – 24 June 1983) was a graphic designer instrumental in the development of the International Typographic Style.

== Biography ==
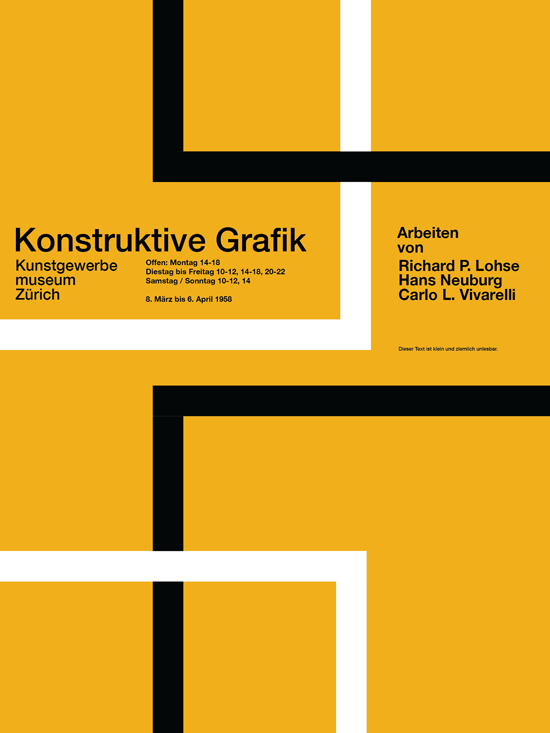
Poster for Konstruktive Grafik exhibition (1958)

Neuburg was born in Králíky, Austria-Hungary and grew up in Zürich where he attended the Orell Füssli Art Institute. Following his graduation, he worked as a designer in advertising and publishing. In 1936, Neuburg opened his own studio in Zurich. In 1958, he became a founding member of Neue Grafik, a quarterly design publication.
