= Brunni (Engelberg) =

Ski resort in Obwalden, Switzerland

Coordinates: 46.841172°N 8.411032°E

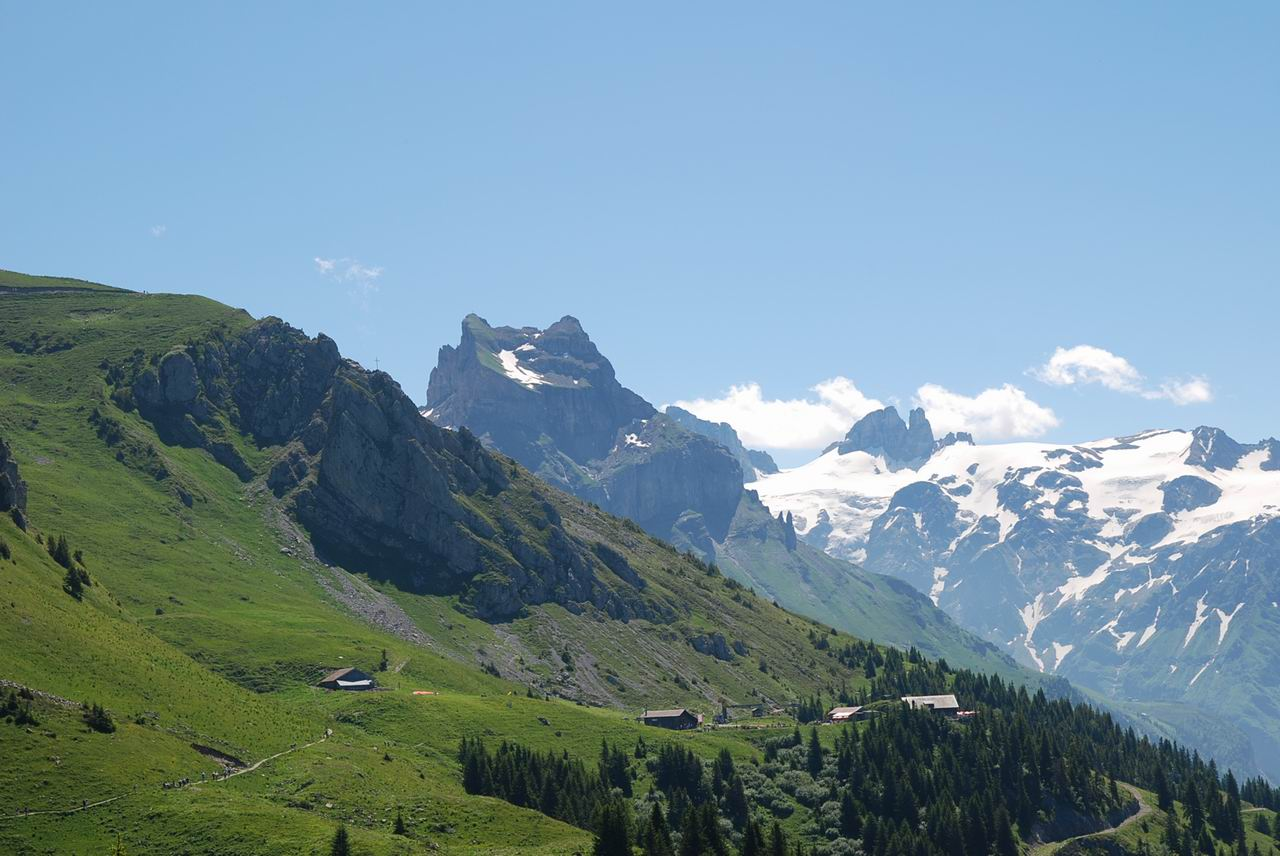
Brunni

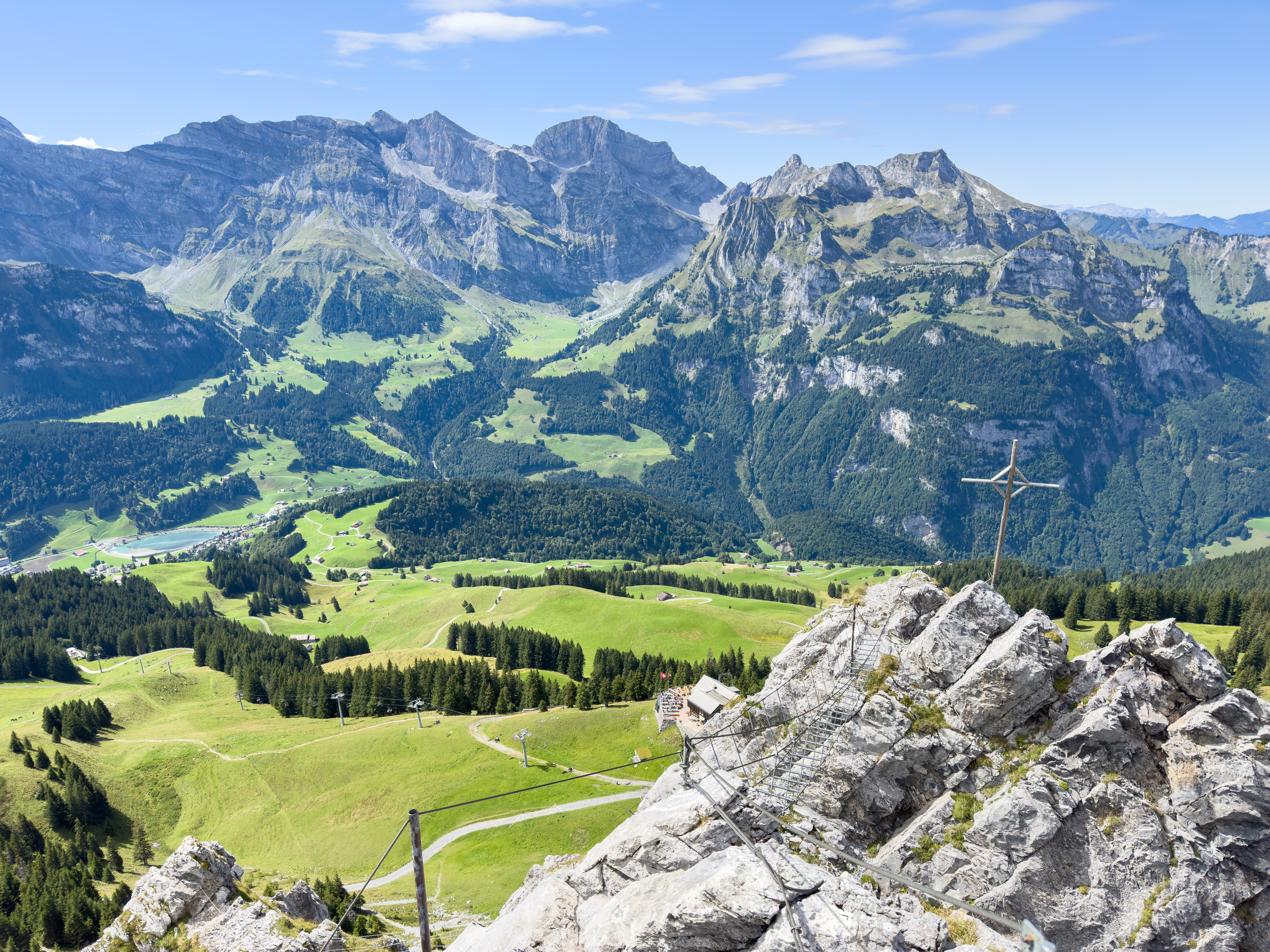
Klettersteig Brunnistöckli

Brunni is a recreational area in the municipality of Engelberg, Obwalden, Switzerland. Located on a south-facing slope, it is known as "Engelberg's sunny side". Since 1950 it is connected by railway thanks to Brunni-Bahnen Engelberg AG.
