= La Rinascente =

Italian department store chain

Rinascente
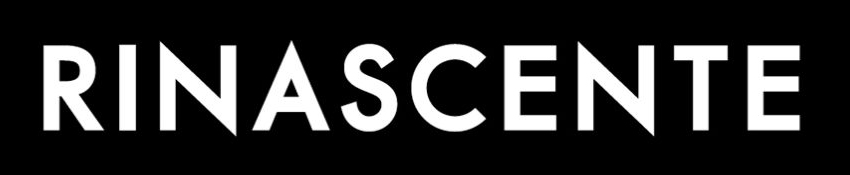
- Industry: Retailer
- Founded: Milan, Italy (1865)
- Headquarters: Milan, Italy
- Number of locations: 9 (2022)
- Key people: Vittorio Radice (Chairman); Mariella Elia (CEO)
- Products: Clothing, food, household items, furniture
- Revenue: €545.9 million
- Number of employees: 1,700
- Parent: Central Group (2011–present) (as Central Retail Corporation PLC until November 2026, then Harng Central Department Store Limited start from November 2026)
- Website: rinascente.it

La Rinascente (Italian for '"she who is reborn"'; pronounced [la rinaʃˈʃɛnte]) is a high-end Italian department store chain. Founded in Milan in 1865, it adopted its current name in 1917, coined by the poet Gabriele D'Annunzio. In 1954, the company launched the Compasso d'Oro, an Italian industrial design award later managed by the ADI. In 2016, its Milan store at Piazza del Duomo was named "Best Department Store in the World" by the Intercontinental Group of Department Stores (IGDS).

The chain operates nine stores in Italy, including two flagship locations in Milan (Piazza del Duomo) and Rome (Via del Tritone).

The company was a member of the International Association of Department Stores from 1959 to 2008, with various CEOs of the chain acting as presidents of the association over time.

== History ==
=== 1865–1939: Early history ===
In 1865, brothers Luigi and Ferdinando Bocconi opened a store on Via Santa Radegonda, Milan, the first shop in Italy that sold ready-to-wear clothing. By the following year, the store employed over a hundred workers to manufacture ready-to-wear suits for men.

Between 1872 and 1876, they set up branches in Via del Corso in Rome as well as in Genoa, Trieste, Palermo, and Turin.

In 1877, they opened the department store Aux Villes d'Italie ("To the Cities of Italy") at the Hotel Comfortable. This was the first of its kind in Italy, and was conceived following the model of Aristide Boucicaut's store, Le Bon Marché in Paris, made famous by Émile Zola in his 1883-novel Au Bonheur des Dames. In 1880, the store took the Italianized name Alle città d'Italia, and in 1887 a new store designed by Giulio De Angelis opened in Rome in Piazza Colonna.

In 1889, the new building of Piazza Duomo, designed by Giovanni Giachi, opened its doors in Milan.

In 1917, Senator Borletti purchased the company from the Bocconi Brothers and commissioned poet Gabriele D'Annunzio to find a new name. His suggestion was Rinascente, a name to convey the idea of the 'rebirth' of the store, which was officially registered on 27 September 1917. Under Borletti, the objective was to make the store elegant and distinctive by selling high-quality products without excessive prices and take a "democratic" approach to luxury that would attract customers of both high and middle-low income classes.

A few days before the grand opening of the new store, on Christmas night of 1918, a fire destroyed the store in Milan in Piazza Duomo. Between 1919 and 1920, the stores in Turin, Genoa, Bologna, Florence, Rome, Naples, and Palermo were revamped. Over the years, other stores opened: Padua (1923), Catania (1923), Messina (1924), Bari (1925), Piazza Loreto in Milan, Corso Vittorio Emanuele II in Rome, Taranto, Syracuse, and Trapani (all between 1927 and 1928).

The Piazza Duomo flagship reopened in 1921 after a complete rebuild, which expanded the store to include additional services (a bank, hair salon, tearoom and post office).

During the 1920s, important architects and designers like Gio Ponti worked with their Rinascente's in-house designers to design new modern furniture for La Rinascente.

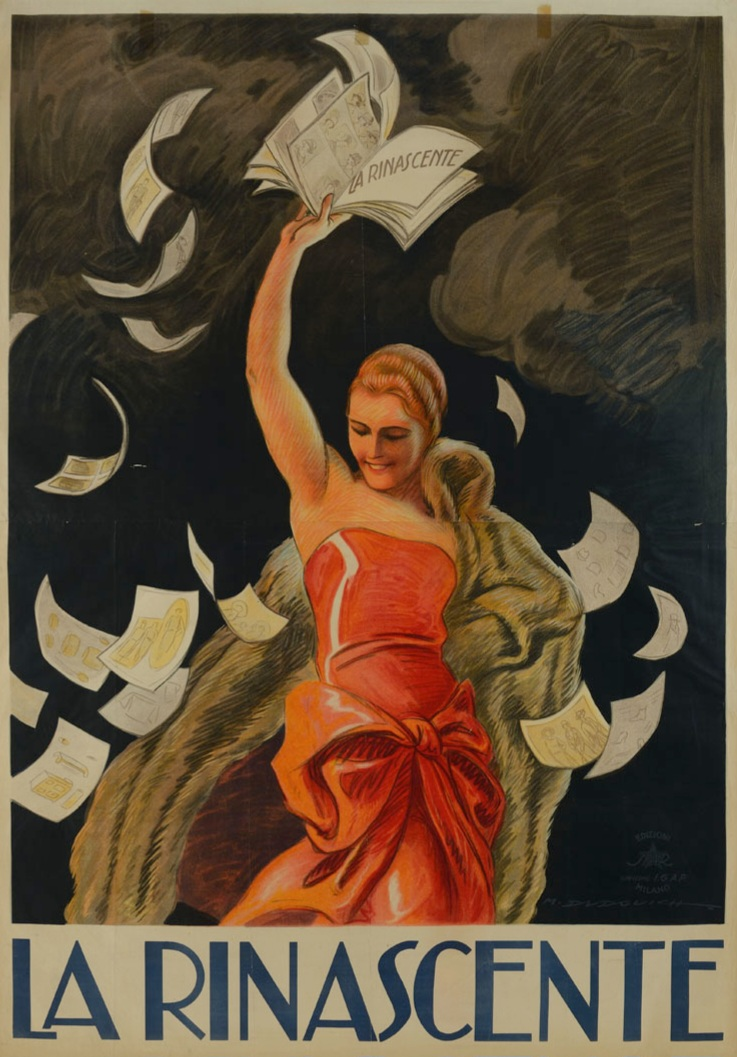
Advertising poster by Marcello Dudovich, 1929

The majority stakeholder Senator Borletti entrusted the daily operation of the company to the hands of Umberto Brustio, his son-in-law. During these years, Rinascente established and strengthened its business relationship with Marcello Dudovich. The Trieste-born artist would go on to create advertising posters for the company until 1956.

In 1928, after collaborating with the German-based company Leonhard Tietz to introduce a store with fixed pricing in Italy, la Rinascente merged with UPIM to create a new company. This new enterprise had a new partner, namely the department store Jelmoli in Zurich, and consisted of 5 Rinascente and 25 UPIM stores around Italy. In 1937, the Piazza Colonna store in Rome installed the first escalator in a retail outlet in Italy. These were the years in which many Made in Italy products were launched and soon became popular all around. Prominence was given to synthetic fabrics such as rayon, cafioc (artificial hemp) and artificial wool, which all took centre stage. At this time, Rinascente launched campaigns to promote products manufactured by Italian companies and created strong ties through its distribution network with consumers, thus catering for the needs of the general public. After Senator Borletti's death in 1939, Umberto Brustio was appointed president of the company. In 1941, the National Clothing Association declared La Rinascente as a leader in the retail market since its sales area in square metres was double that of Standa and Coin put together. The following year, the company celebrated its 25th anniversary and counted 5 Rinascente and 52 UPIM stores.

=== 1940–1945: World War II ===
The company suffered great losses during World War II. The stores in Genoa and Cagliari were completely destroyed. On 16 August 1943, the store in Piazza Duomo was practically razed to the ground; only one Rinascente store in Rome and 37 UPIM stores around Italy were still partially operational. The City Council of Milan allowed La Rinascente to rent three large rooms in the Palazzo della Ragione in Via Mercanti so that it could keep supplying the general public with goods.

=== 1946–1959: Post-war recovery and the 1950s ===
After the war, there was a rapid and vigorous recovery. Between 1945 and 1946, a rebuilding project included 19 UPIM stores, la Rinascente in Cagliari, the Head Office in Via Carducci, Milan, as well as the warehousing facilities. On 4 December 1950, the Rinascente store in Piazza Duomo reopened its doors. The façade of the building had been designed by Ferdinando Reggiori. Carlo Pagani was responsible for designing the store windows, entrances as well as the interior design and furnishings. Modern escalators connected the different floors of the building. Max Huber created the new logo while Albe Steiner was in charge of external and internal promotional fixtures and graphics until 1955. During this time, Rinascente sold products imported mainly from the US and promoted a series of cultural events, which gave the public a glimpse of what was happening around the world. Countries featured in these dedicated events included Spain (1955), Japan (1956), Great Britain (1957), the U.S (1958), India and Thailand (1959), Mexico (1960) and a special event to promote the culture of the Indios in 1964. 1955 saw the inauguration of the new 'Circolo della Rinascente' located in Via Durini, Milan and the setting up of a PR office; while an office for market research was created in 1957. Lora Lamm was in charge of advertising graphics, while Amneris Latis was the Art Director of the advertising department.

In 1957, after 40 years, Umberto Brustio left his top management position and was nominated Honorary President. Aldo Borletti, Senator Borletti's son, was elected President, and together with Cesare and Giorgio Bustio, he also acted as Managing Director. One of the leading figures within top management was Cesare Bustio, Managing Director and Vice President.

==== The "Compasso d'Oro" award ====
In 1954, Rinascente established the Compasso d'Oro award, the brainchild of Gio Ponti, Livio Castiglioni, and Alberto Rosselli. This prize was awarded for the best industrial production and for those designers who, in creating everyday objects, knew how to combine aesthetics with functionality. Albe Steiner, who got the idea from one of his own work instruments, created the logo of the award, while it was left to Alberto Rosselli and Marco Zanuso to design the actual compass given as a prize. In 1959, Rinascente gave control of the award to the Association for Industrial Design (ADI) that had been founded in 1956. The Compasso d'Oro grew to become the highest honour in the field of industrial design in Italy, comparable to other prestigious international awards such as the Good Design award, iF Design Award, Red Dot Award, the Cooper-Hewitt National Design Awards, and the Good Design Award (Japan).

=== 1960–1969: Growth ===
In 1961, the company created the Sma Supermarkets chain. These stores followed the model of the first Italian supermarket, which opened in Milan in Viale Regina Giovanna in 1957. During the Christmas period, there was such a great influx of customers that the Rinascente store in Milan was at times forced to block the entrances owing to overcrowding.

Also in that year, Rinascente opened a new store designed by Franco Albini and Franca Helg in Piazza Fiume, Rome. The store extended over 7 floors linked together by lifts, escalators and a famous spiral staircase designed by Albini.

In 1963, French fashion designer Pierre Cardin signed a contract with la Rinascente to create a line of moderately priced garments, declaring that the latest fashion pieces should be accessible to all. Adriana Botti Monti also became the Art Director of the store, and over her time working for the store, she won numerous awards and prizes.

In 1967, after Aldo Borletti's death, the newly appointed president of the group became Senator Borletti (the son of one of the founder's brothers), and Cesare Brustio became the CEO.

=== 1969–2005: Operations under FIAT Group ===
In 1969, the Borleti family sold their shares to IFI and Mediobanca, which had held shares in the company since 1965.

In 1970, Guido Colonna di Paliano was appointed president of the company. At the time, the group owned 5 Rinascente stores, 150 UPIM stores and 54 Sma supermarkets.

In 1972, Rinascente – Città Mercato opened in Brescia as the first hypermarket selling at bargain prices. The aim of the new company's management was to overcome the contrast between the large retail sector and traditional retail. The retail outlet in Piazza Duomo was refurbished, and the new organisation of Rinascente became more rational and in line with the times. In 1973, the company opened a new store in Turin. Umberto Brustio died on 25 April 1972, and Senator Borletti became Vice President on 23 March 1973.

In 1977, the group acquired JC Penney's (a large American department store chain) 4 stores in the Lombardy region as Rinascente pushed for a bigger market share.

In 1983, the group opened the first Italian Bricocenter, a DIY store, in Turin. Two years later, the negotiations were successfully concluded for the purchase of Croff Nuova SpA, a company specialising in the distribution of homeware. In 1997, Fiat Estates stipulated a financial and technical agreement with Auchan, resulting in the gradual conversion of the 23 'Città Mercato' and the 2 'Joyland' to the Auchan brand. The group closed with an increase in turnover and developed new strategies to reach the objective of strengthening the food sector by opening 40 hypermarkets by 2002.

=== 2005–2009: Operations under Associated Investors Group ===
Following the split of the Fiat Group in 2005, Rinascente was taken over by a group of investors (20% Pirelli Real Estate, 46% Associated Investors, 30% Deutsche Bank Real Estate, 4% Borletti family) and La Rinascente S.p.A. was set up. This started a period of change with the aim of repositioning the brand into an upmarket position, thus increasing its value.

This was achieved by means of restructuring and updating all stores and upgrading the type of products available. The complete renovation of the store in Piazza Duomo included the addition of an extremely cosmopolitan Food Hall in 2007, and in 2009, the Design Supermarket took up a whole floor with over 200 brands on display.

=== 2010–present: Recent history ===
In May 2011 the Thailand-based Central Retail Corporation, purchased Rinascente for €205 million.

During a press conference, Tos Chirathivat (CEO of Central) said “Our ultimate goal is to take it global and to be recognised all across Asia, be it in Thailand, China, Japan or Hong Kong,” and that he wanted the brand to be one of the top 5 department stores in the world. It was also announced that new stores would open in Rome and Venice. The following year Alberto Baldan, General Manager since 2007, was appointed CEO. Vittorio Radice took on the role of Vice President, charged with the international development of the luxury stores within the group.

On 26 May 2016, Rinascente Milan received the award as the best department store in the world during the ceremony in Zurich of the Global Department Store Summit 2016.

In October 2017, a second store in Rome opened in an 8-storey building on Via del Tritone. The store was originally scheduled to open in 2012 but was delayed several times and overall was in development for 11 years with a total cost of €200 million. On the floor −1 the remains of the Aqua Virgo aqueduct dating back to 19 CE are visible.

The Padua store was closed in December 2019 after being in operation since 1999. The store was closed due to low sales and the high price to rent the store's building.

In 2026, Central Retail Corporation (CRC) announced that its Board of Directors had resolved to approve the disposal of the Rinascente Business Unit, operated through CRC Holland B.V., to Harng Central Department Store Limited, a major shareholder of the company. The transaction, valued at 13,000 million baht (€347.20 million), is classified as a connected transaction under Thai securities regulations. Upon completion, Rinascente will cease to be held by a listed company and revert to private ownership. According to CRC, the disposal will enable the group to streamline its portfolio and strengthen its focus on core growth within Southeast Asian markets, aligning with its long-term strategic objectives.
