= Globus (department store) =

Swiss retail company

- Company type: Public
- Industry: Retail
- Founded: 1907
- Headquarters: Spreitenbach, Switzerland
- Key people: Thomas Herbert
- Products: upscale goods, including clothing, cosmetics, jewelry and household supplies
- Owner: Central Group
- Number of employees: 3,400 (2016)
- Parent: Central Group
- Website: https://www.globus.ch

Globus is a Swiss department store company, with nine department stores in Switzerland. It is currently owned by a Thai company, Central Group. The Globus group includes the Herren Globus chain of menswear stores and the Office World chain of office supplies stores, was previously owned by Switzerland's largest retailer, Migros.

Its main branches are located in the three principal cities of Switzerland, i.e. Zurich, Geneva and Basel.

It had been a member of the International Association of Department Stores from 1931 to 2020, with various CEOs acting as presidents of the Association over time.

== History ==
Globus was founded in 1907 in Zurich, and now has stores in all major Swiss cities. The chain sells mostly upscale goods, including clothing, cosmetics, jewelry and household supplies. The stores are noted for their extensive delicatessen section, called Globus Delicatessa, and their former mascot, Globi, the comic books about whom have been a fixture in the childhood of many Swiss.

In 2020, Migros sold its ownership in Globus to KaDeWe Group, which is co-owned by Austrian conglomerate Signa Holding and Thailand's Central Group.

in September 2024, Central Group acquired full ownership of Globus department stores in Switzerland. This acquisition followed financial difficulties and the bankruptcy of Austria's real estate tycoon René Benko's Signa Group in late 2023, making Central Group the sole owner of all 9 Globus branches in Switzerland.

== Department stores ==

There are Globus department stores in:

- Basel, BS
- Bern BE
- Geneva, GE
- Lausanne, VD
- Lucerne, LU
- St. Gallen, SG
- Zurich (2), ZH
- The Glatt shopping centre
  in Wallisellen, near Zurich

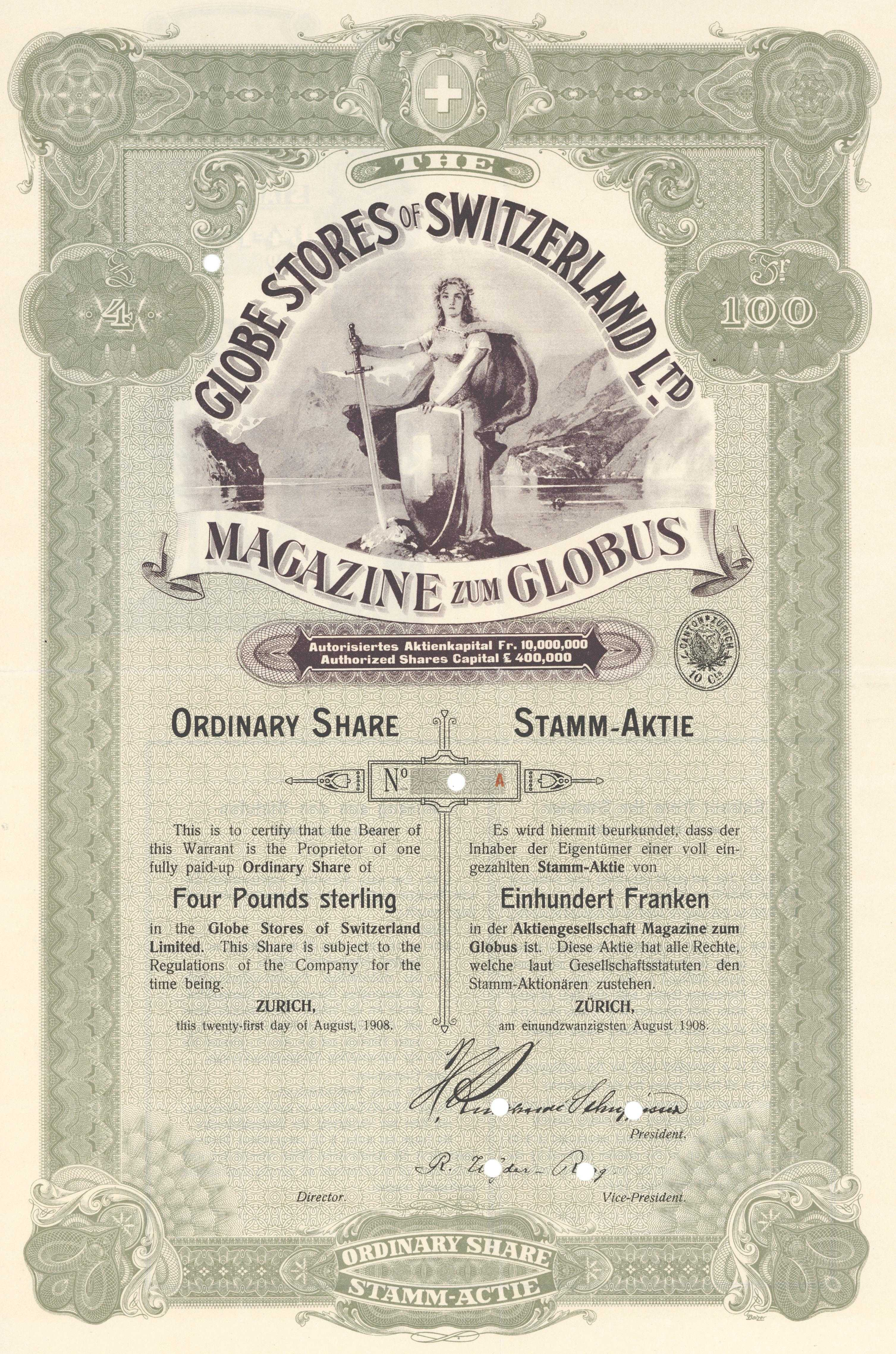
Share of the Magazine zum Globus company, issued 21 August 1908

== See also ==
- Migros
- Globi
