= Los Diez Pintores Concretos =

== History ==
Los Diez Pintores Concretos (The Ten Concrete Painters) was a mid-20th-century Cuban avant-garde visual art collective dedicated to the rigorous principles of geometric abstraction and Concretism. Formally active as a group from 1959 until 1961, its members included Pedro de Oraá, Loló Soldevilla, Sandú Darié, Pedro Carmelo Álvarez López, Wifredo Arrcay Ochandarena, Salvador Zacarías Corratgé Ferrera, Luis Darío Martínez Pedro, José María Mijares, Rafael Soriano López, and José Ángel Rosabal Fajardo.

The group's activities centered on the Galeria Color-Luz, an experimental space founded in Havana by Soldevilla and de Oraá in 1957. Their practice was part of a broader resurgence of Latin American Concretism during the late 1940s and 1950s; notably, through Darié, Los Diez maintained conceptual links to the Argentine Grupo Madí.

Though Los Diez "affirm[ed] their work as a transformative intervention into - not a reflection of, nor an escape from - the world," the group "struggled to advance their social manifesto," especially within the rapidly shifting political landscape of post-revolutionary Cuba. The closing of Galería Color-Luz in 1961 marked the group's official dissolution after only three joint exhibitions.

Decades after their disbandment, Los Diez became the subject of a major critical reassessment, highlighted by the exhibition Concrete Cuba at David Zwirner (London, 2015; New York, 2016). The accompanying catalogue features a definitive interview with Pedro de Oraá, the group’s last surviving member and principal theorist, conducted by Lucas Zwirner.

Los Diez was the subject of the exhibition Concrete Cuba at the David Zwirner Gallery displayed at the gallery's London location in 2015 and their New York City venue in 2016. An accompanying catalogue features an interview with Pedro de Oraá, then the last surviving member of the group, by Lucas Zwirner.

== Legacy ==
The legacy of Los Diez is defined by their radical departure from the "vernacular" traditions of Cuban art. While their official existence was brief, their impact served as the foundation for the next several decades of abstract and kinetic experimentation in the Caribbean.

=== The Shift to "Universal" Cuban Art ===
Before Los Diez, Cuban modernism was often defined by its relationship to the island—tropical colors, Santería symbols, and baroque architectural motifs (as seen in the works of Amelia Peláez or René Portocarrero). Los Diez countered this expectation by adopting Concretism and arguing that Cuban art could be "universal" and "autonomous," standing on its own merits of form and color rather than acting as a mirror to national identity.

=== Precursors to Kinetic and Op Art ===
The group’s focus on the "vibration" of color and the physical interaction with space—most notably in Loló Soldevilla’s light-integrated reliefs and Sandú Darié’s "environmental" structures—paved the way for the Kinetic and Optical art movements that would later dominate Latin American art in the 1960s and 70s. Artists like Jorge Camacho and even later movements in Venezuelan Kineticism (Cruz-Diez, Soto) share a clear lineage with the spatial experiments started at the Galería Color-Luz.

=== Contemporary Rediscovery ===
For decades, the group was sidelined by the post-revolutionary preference for social realism. Their legacy was largely preserved through the private efforts of Pedro de Oraá and international collectors. The 2015 Concrete Cuba exhibition marked a "critical homecoming," finally positioning Los Diez as a pillar of the 20th-century Latin-American avant-garde.
