= Art Concret =

French-language art magazine (1930)

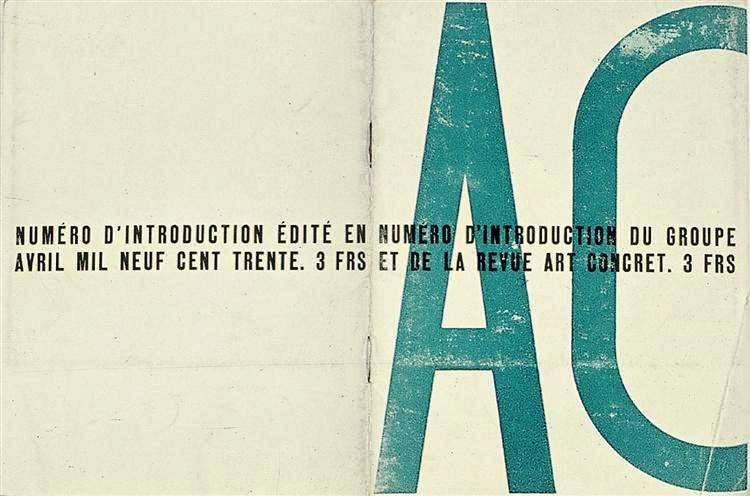
Theo van Doesburg's cover design for Art Concret

Art Concret was a single-issue French-language art magazine published in Paris in 1930. It was the vehicle for a group of abstract artists who wished to differentiate themselves from others gathered around the magazine Cercle et Carré. Eventually most in both groups fused in the wider association of non-figurative artists, Abstraction-Création. Articles in Art Concret championed strictly geometrical art, free of personal interpretation and based on mathematics. It also ridiculed the sloppy and imprecise vocabulary of contemporary art criticism. The concept of Concrete Art championed by the magazine was thereafter taken up by other artists and became influential internationally.

== Background ==
With the growing power of Surrealism, abstract artists living in Paris felt the need to assert their preferred style and began to discuss creating a united front. Theo van Doesburg had taken part in such conversations, initially with Joaquín Torres-García, but complained of insufficiently rigorous criteria for the type of work that should be included. Eventually he lost the argument and Torres-García joined with Michel Seuphor in creating the more inclusive Cercle et Carré group in 1929.

During the war of words that followed, Van Doesburg accused Seuphor of "intellectual sloppiness worthy of venal art dealers and critics" and tried to recruit a rival group more in accord with his view of what abstract art should be. He was joined by the Armenian Léon Arthur Tutundjian, the Swede Otto Gustaf Carlsund, and the Frenchman Jean Hélion. In their names Van Doesburg sent a copy of a manifesto stating their position on abstract art (eventually to appear under the title Base de la peinture concrete) to Friedrich Vordemberge-Gildewart, who declined to sign it. Until then, the new group was to be called Groupement 6,6 but never did reach that number. When the manifesto was published under its new title, it was signed only by Tutundjian, Carlsund, Van Doesburg and Hélion, with the addition of Hélion's fellow lodger, the teenaged typographer Marcel Wantz (1911–79). An unsuccessful approach had meanwhile been made to Walmar Schwab who, while he was willing for his work to appear in the magazine, was temperamentally indisposed to put his name to anything so formal.

The retitled manifesto appeared in the group's magazine, by now called Art Concret, in April 1930, a month after the first issue of the rival Cercle et Carré. But the group only exhibited together on three occasions, and even then as part of larger group exhibitions which also included Cercle et Carré members. The first was at the Salon des Surindépendants in June, followed in August by the exhibition AC: Internationell utställning av postkubistisk konst (International exhibition of post-cubist art) in Stockholm and in October by Production Paris 1930 in Zürich. At the same time Van Doesburg hosted further discussions at his home with the artists of both groups and early in 1931 launched the new movement, Abstraction-Création, with himself briefly as vice-president.

== The magazine ==
On the cream-coloured front cover of the magazine, which measured 18.5 x 14 cm, appeared the large initials AC in a narrow sans-serif font, overprinted at the centre with the information "Introduction of the group and of the magazine Art Concret" in bold capital letters. Across the back cover this was supplemented with the information "Introductory number issued in April nineteen thirty". The group manifesto, followed by the surnames only of the five involved, appeared on page 1. The key points made there were that "A work of art must be entirely conceived and shaped by the mind before its execution. It should receive nothing from nature's formal properties nor from sensuality nor sentimentality. We want to exclude lyricism, dramaticism, symbolism, etc…The painting should be constructed entirely from purely plastic elements, that is to say planes and colours."

Van Doesburg's (unsigned) "commentaries" followed on pages 2–4 and were dated Paris, January 1930. In them he argued that, after the eras of natural and artistic form, comes the new era of mental form (forme esprit), "the concretisation of the creative mind. Concrete, not abstract painting, because nothing is more concrete than a line, a colour, a surface. As painters, we think and measure," avoiding interpretation and subjectivity. Jean Hélion's "The Problems of Concrete Art: Art and Mathematics", dated simply 1930, followed on pages 5–10. The article was punctuated by a reproduction of a Tutundjian relief (dated 1929) between pages 6–7 and a fold-out smaller sheet with designs by Carlsund, "Doesbourg", Hélion and Tutundjian (all dated 1930), between pages 8–9. Hélion opened with the proposition: "If art is universal, it escapes both personality and era. It belongs to the domain of constant certainties and is under the control of logic. The search for constants through logic is the shared aim of mathematics. Mathematics concretise constant certainties via formulae; painting does it via colours. So mathematics and painting are in essential relationship." He later elaborates that the geometrical elements of a painting appear in numerical relationship but are modified by colour; works of art always differ from one another because of the laws of relativity.

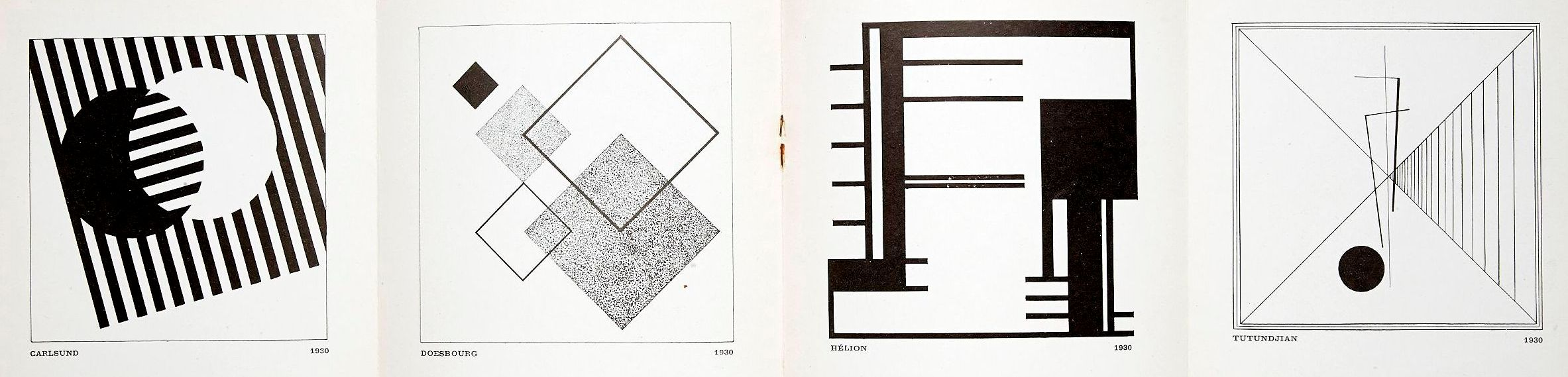
The Art Concret centrefold, April 1930

Van Doesburg's "Towards White Painting" followed on pages 11–12, dated December 1929. "Left behind us is the brown of rottenness and classicism," he proclaims. "THERE'S NOTHING TO READ IN PAINT, ONLY SEEING", for art has grown up and "in place of dream the future will substitute art based on science and the technical". A statement in French, English and German appeared separately at the foot of the page: "Art is the spiritual transformation of (the) material". Page 13 had a sideways print by Schwab, titled "Composition" and dated 1929. The following page was taken up with a satirical attack on art journalism: first "A few words that have nothing to do with art": "sensibility, sensuality, emotion," but also including watchwords of the Cercle et Carré group ("abstraction") and of the Cubists ("instantaneity"); then on the second half of the page a section titled "Critical standards for hire", a verbal collage created from a vacuous "selection of recent items in the press".

"We are not alone", the Art Concret signatories assured readers on page 15, quoting from various public figures and artists, among whom appear the English dandies, Beau Brummel and Oscar Wilde. The board appealed on the final page for other painters to join them (so long as they approve the editorial stance and apply it), giving 50, rue Pierre Larousse as the editorial address and crediting Hélion as the director. Hélion later dismissed the magazine as "a flash in the pan" and "a harangue in a public garden, a vast and almost empty one". Nevertheless, the group's manifesto had helped popularise the term Concrete Art and, through the championship of others (Torres-García among them), resulted eventually in the establishment of geometric abstraction under this name as an international phenomenon. By then the magazine had become a historical document and a reprint was issued in 1976.

== Bibliography ==
- Art Concret, a facsimile of the magazine
- Jean Hélion, “Art Concret 1930: Four Painters and a Magazine”
- Marie-Aline Prat, Peinture Et Avant-garde Au Seuil Des Annees 30, , L'Age d'Homme, Lausanne 1984
