= Víctor Miquel Moreno Piñeiro =

Víctor Miquel Moreno Piñeiro, known as Victor Moreno (17 June 1951 – 14 November 2015) was a Cuban painter. He was born in Placetas, Villa Clara, Cuba and died in Havanna, Cuba.

== Early life ==
Victor Moreno started painting at age five. José Enriquez, cousin of Carlos Enríquez taught Victor how to mix colors. Later on Victor was a student of Raimundo Garcia Parra and Master René Portocarrero.

René Portocarrero said about Victor Moreno: "Tiene la tristeza de Van Gogh, pero una tristeza iluminada. Sus Ciudades tienen algo de vegetal. Tiene maestria en el uso de los colores dramaticos. En sus estudios sobre pacientes ha logrado una gran profundidad sicologica y plastica."

Raul Milian said about Victor Moreno: "Sus tintas son muy buenas y algunas extraordinaias".

The Los Angeles County Museum of Art and the Louvre own works by him.

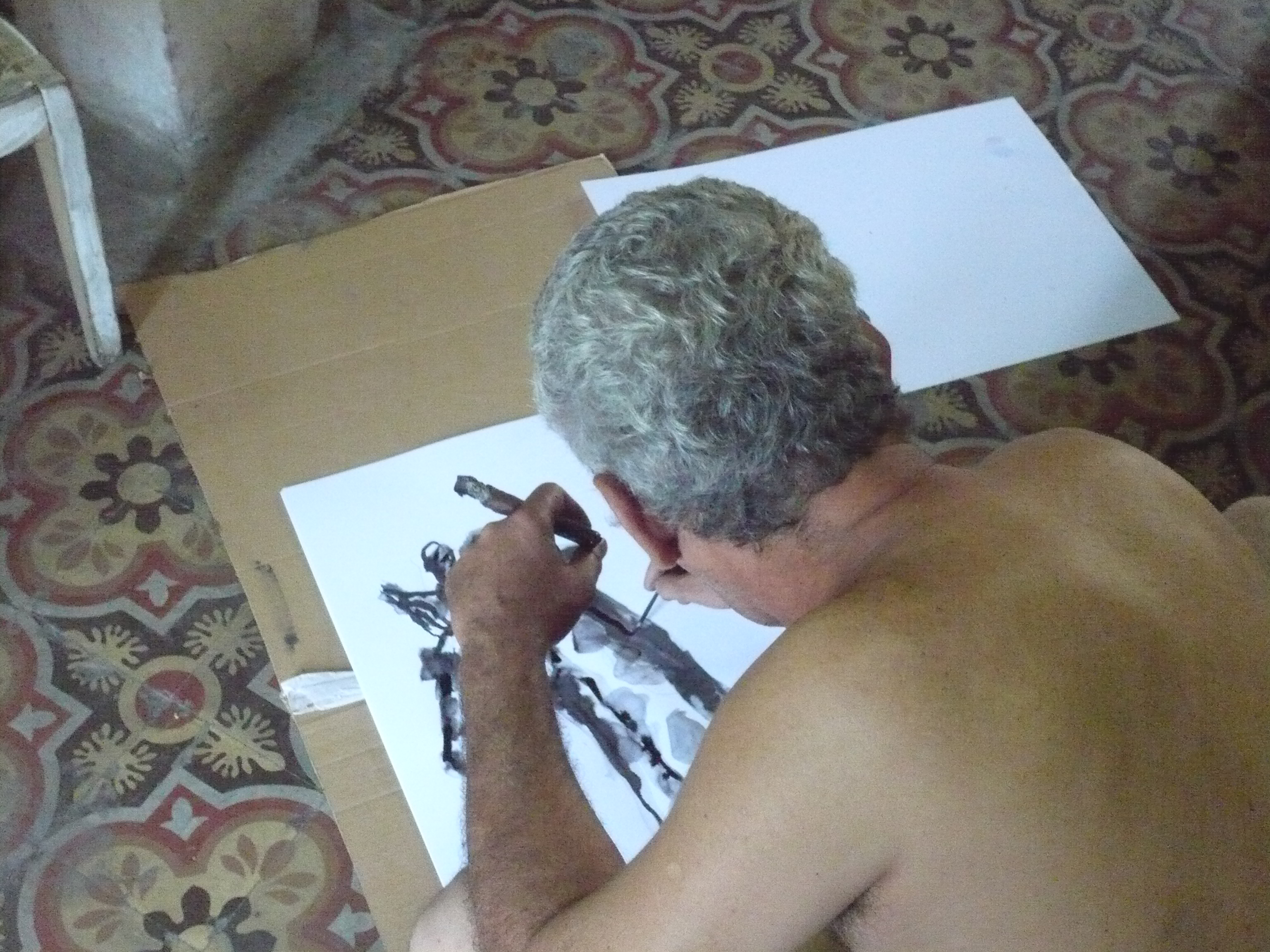
Victor Moreno while he is drawing the jirafe Guckindieluft

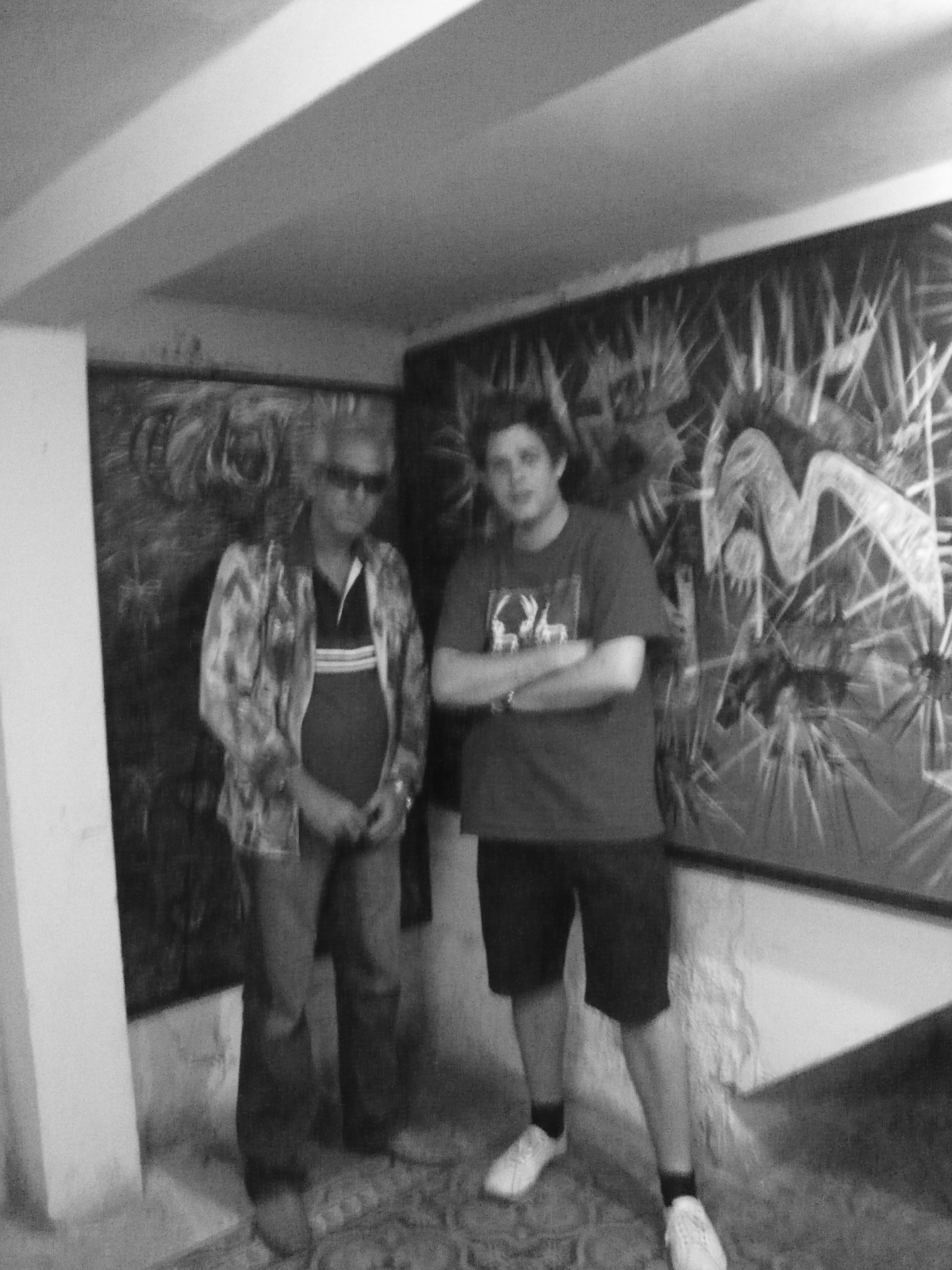
Victor Miquel Moreno Piñeiro (Victor Moreno) and Felix Busse (German writer) in Habana

== Personal exhibitions ==
- "Vivencias" Galeria Guanabacao, Octubre de 1984
- "Victor Moreno Pinta" Galeria Ciudad Celeste, 1992
- "Estados Emocional" Galeria Fragua Martiana, Marzo 1999
- "Abstractos y Figuraciones" Casa de la FEU, 2000
- "Del Mar a la Leyenda" Galeria 10 de Octubre, Julio 2000
- "El Ser que llevo dentro" Memorial Salvador Allende, 2001
- "Azul, Blanco y Rojo" Memorial Salvador Allende, Deciembre 2002
- "Del equilibrio interior al Retrato de Neyeyda" Casa del Pedagogo Raúl Ferrer, Marzo 2003
- "4 d'2" Biblioteca del Canal, Agosto 2003
- "Mis ya Fragmentos Delirios" Hospital Squi. Habana, 19 April 2004
- "ST" Frankfurter Buchmesse 2009

== Collective exhibitions ==
- VI Bienal de la Habana
- "Asi fuimos y asi somos" Galeria de la Habana, Octubre 1983
- "Vivencias" Casa de Cultura Guanabocoa, Octubre 1984
- "Herencias", Grupo Raices, Diciembre 1984
- "Encuentro Plástica Guanabacao" Junio 1985
- "Grupo Raices" Galeria Galiano, Junio 1985
- "Grupo Raices" sin fecha
- "Grupo Raices del Atlas" April 1985
- "Salon Plaza 85" 4 April 1985
- "Grupo Raices" sin fecha
- "Salon de pequeno formato" sin fecha
- "Grupo realismoInterno" Galeria 23 y 12
- "Grupo Raices del Atlas" sin fecha
- "Tres mirados sobre un Tema" Galeria Merceditas Valdes, Sociedad Yoruba
- "Grupo Raices" Galeria Galiano, 1985
- "Encuentro de Plástica Guanabacoa 85"
- "Grupo Raices" Casa de Cultura de Guanabacoa, Mayo 1985
- "Sociedad Arabe" 29 Mayo de 1985
- "Grupo Realismo Interno" Galeria UPEC, April 1986
- "Concurso 13 de marzo" Galeria L, 1986
- "Grupo Raices" Galeria San Miquel, Octubre 1986
- "Exposicion de Pintura Cubanas" Repúplica Dominicana, Marzo 1987
- "Concurso 13 de marzo" Marzo 1987
- "Concurso 13 de marzo" Marzo 1989
- "Salon Pequeño Formato" Octubre 1998
- "Casa Guayasamin" 13 April de 1999
- "Salon pequeño Formato" 19 Octubre de 1999
- "Bienal de la Habana 2000" Destacamento Wifredo Lam, contingent Juan Marinello
- "Salon pequeño formato" 21 de Noviembre del 2000
- "Salon pequeño Formate" UNAM MEXICO
- "Salon pequeño Formate" 21 Marzo del 2001
- "Parque Lenin" Galeria Amelia Peláez, 31 Enero del 2001
- "Homenaje a Juan Marinello" Noviembre 2 del 2001
- "Salon pequeño Formato" Galeria L. VII Bienal de la Habana, Mayo 2001
- "Arte y Religion" Galeria 10 de Octubre, Septiembre 2002
- "Plásticos Ufologes" Artemisa, Octubre 2002
- "Salon pequeño Formato" Galeria L., Octubre 2002
- "Expocision UFO" Biblioteca Rubén Martinez Villena, Junio 2003
- "Salon pequeño Formate" Galeria L., 2003
- "Arte UFO 2003 Galeria" Angerona" Artemisa 19 de Octubre
- "Salon pequeño Formate" Galeria L., 2004
- "Concurso 13 Marzo" Galeria L. 11-31 de Marzo 2004
- Kunstflur, Paris, 2010 (under construction)

== Award ==
- Concurso Combate, LA CASA MUSE "HURON AZUL" Y LA GALERIA DE ARTE "HER CAR" 2000

== Gifts ==
- Lucha contra el SIDA, UNEAC, Julio 2000
- Paintings for Mexico, 26 de Deciembre de 1985
- Festival de la Juventud y los Estudiantes

== Personal ==
- Ingresso en la Brigada Hermanos Sainz en el 1985
- Miembro del Fondo Cubano de Bienes Culturales
- Miembro de la Brigada Wifredo Lam del Contingent Juan Marinello
- Miembro del Projecto YETI de la UNEAC
- UFO (Grupo Sirio)

== Collectors ==
- Museum (permanent), Caracas, Venezuela
- New York Presbyterian / University Hospitales of Colombia and Cornell
- Rampo College of New Jersey / School of Contemporary Art
- Mount Sinai School of Medical New York
- LACMA
