= Otto Gustaf Carlsund =

Swedish artist and art critic

Portrait by Jan de Meyere

Otto Gustaf Carlsund (11 December 1897 – 25 July 1948) was a Swedish avant-garde artist and art critic, connected to cubism, purism, neo-plasticism, and concrete art.

== Biography ==
In 1924 he moved to Paris to study under Fernand Léger and Amédée Ozenfant at their newly founded Académie Moderne, where he developed a style of painting at first resembling Léger's, though soon became greatly influenced by Ozenfant's Purist style. In 1925 he met Le Corbusier and was commissioned to create murals for a cinema he was working on, though the project was eventually shelved, and in the same year he was recommended by Ozenfant to create murals for the planned library annex to Erich Mendelsohn's Einstein Tower. Although Mendelsohn eventually abandoned this later project, an example of the designs from the series of paintings that Carlsund had prepared for the Einstein Library - the suite Rapidité - was realized in a mural at the Stockholm restaurant Parkrestaurangen Lilla Paris, in connection with the Stockholm Exhibition in 1930. In 1926 he was invited by Katherine Dreier and Société Anonyme to participate in her exhibition International Exhibition of Modern Art at the Brooklyn Museum in New York City. featuring both his mural projects, and over the following years he exhibits several times in Paris, also again in New York at Jane Heap's Little Review Gallery (1928), the Arts Council (1928), and the Rand School (1931). As he met Piet Mondrian, Theo van Doesburg and the circle of radical artists working in the neo-plasticist aesthetic, he came to adopt an increasingly reduced vocabulary of abstract rectilinear form, as well as being more and more affected by Constructivism.

=== Art concret ===
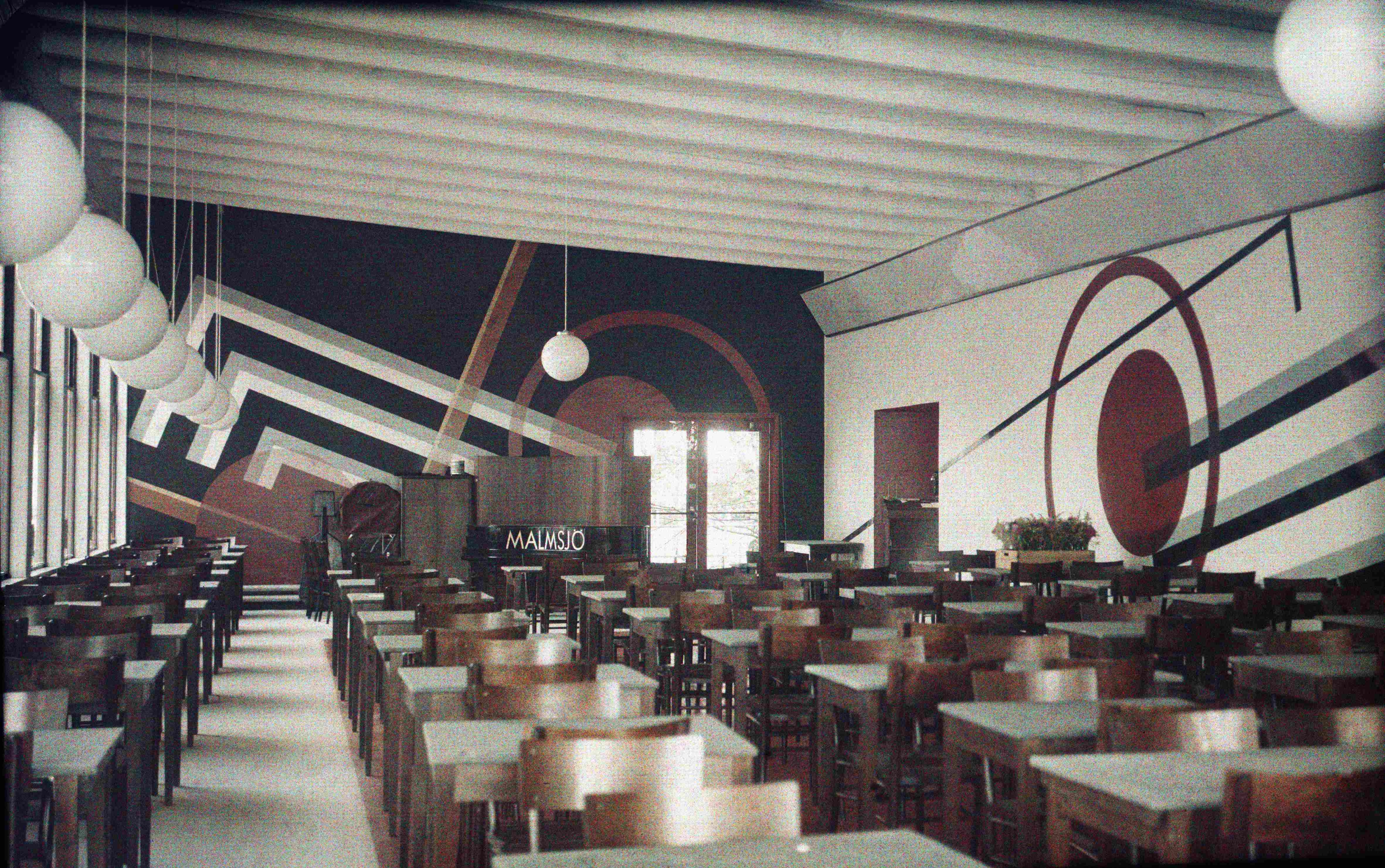
Mural Rapid at the restaurant Parkrestaurangen Lilla Paris, Stockholm, 1930

In 1929 he and van Doesburg, Jean Hélion, Léon Arthur Tutundjian and Marcel Wantz (1911–79) founded the group Art Concret, and the following year they published their joint manifesto. "Their proclamation called for a universal art composed of planes and colours executed crisply, precisely, mechanically. Form and rhythm were governed by mathematical principles, while abstract cinema provided a model of combining space and time in a single work of art" The group was short lived and only exhibited together at three occasions in 1930 as part of larger group exhibitions, the first being at Salon des Surindépendents in Paris in June, followed by Production Paris 1930 in Zürich, and in August at the exhibition AC: Internationell utställning av postkubistisk konst (International exhibition of post-cubist art) in Stockholm, curated by Carlsund himself. In the catalog to the latter, Carlsund states that the group's "programme is clear: absolute Purism. Neo-Plasticism, Purism and Constructivism combined". The Stockholm exhibition was largely a failure, getting harsh judgement from unsupportive critics, and ultimately led to Carlsund's decision to move back to Stockholm. Following van Doesburg's death in 1931, the Art Concret group united with the larger association Abstraction-Création, founded in 1932, though was never formally dissolved.

=== Later life ===
After 1932, Carlsund was primarily active as an art critic, still painting and creating murals but not exhibiting his art. Following increased domestic attention to geometric abstraction in the 1940s, a retrospective exhibition was held in Stockholm in 1947 to great acclaim.
