= Hans Hinterreiter =

- Born: 28 January 1902; Winterthur, Switzerland
- Died: 15 September 1989 (aged 87); Santa Eulalia del Río, Ibiza, Spain
- Occupations: Painter, art theorist
- Known for: Concrete art, colour theory

Hans Hinterreiter (28 January 1902 – 15 September 1989) was a Swiss painter and art theorist associated with Concrete art. After studying architecture at ETH Zürich, he developed a systematic approach to painting based on geometric patterns and Wilhelm Ostwald's colour theory. He moved permanently to Ibiza in 1939.

== Biography ==
Hans Hinterreiter was born on 28 January 1902 in Winterthur. From 1920, he studied mathematics before switching soon afterwards to architecture at ETH Zürich. During his studies, he pursued art history and took piano and painting lessons. He also drew and painted with guidance from the landscape painter Wilhelm Ludwig Lehmann. From 1922 to 1924, he travelled in Italy, and in 1925 received his diploma in architecture before gaining practical experience in several architectural offices in Aarau and Bern.

In 1929, Hinterreiter married Mina Sahn. From 1929 to 1935, he lived in Seelisberg, where he painted landscapes. He stayed in Spain from 1934 to 1936. After returning to Switzerland, he came into contact with Max Bill and Zürich artists associated with Concrete art in the later 1930s.

His wife Mina died in 1939, and in the same year Hinterreiter moved permanently to Ibiza. He acquired a farm there in 1953. As a source of income, he designed holiday houses. He married Hanna Marie Elisabeth Ingeborg Bartels in 1963. In 1985, the Hans Hinterreiter Foundation was established in Vaduz. Hinterreiter died on 15 September 1989 in Santa Eulalia del Río, Ibiza.

== Work and theory ==
Hinterreiter was associated with Concrete art. His work centred on geometric patterns and colour theory, with music also informing his approach. His paintings used mathematically planned geometric patterns and varied colour arrangements.

In the early 1930s, Hinterreiter encountered the colour theory of the German chemist Wilhelm Ostwald. He adopted Ostwald's color system as a basis for his painting and developed his own approach to the systematic organisation of form, which he called the Formorgel. After 1930, his compositions often began with a line placed within a regular grid, which he then varied through rotation, reflection and repetition. His system has also been discussed from a mathematical perspective, particularly for its use of symbolic notation, grids and non-linear geometric deformations in creating his compositions.

Hinterreiter described some of his works as Farbgedichte, or colour poems, and related them to musical composition. He also set out his ideas in theoretical publications, including Geometrische Schönheit in 1958, A Theory of Form and Color in 1967 and Die Kunst der reinen Form in 1978.

== Exhibitions ==
Hinterreiter exhibited with the Swiss artists’ group Allianz in Zürich in 1942 and 1947. A 1973 exhibition at the Kunstmuseum Winterthur marked a stage in his later recognition. In 2018, the Fundación Juan March organised an exhibition of his work in collaboration with the Hans Hinterreiter Foundation, presenting around 75 works together with documents and publications related to his long-term study of colour and form.
