= Concrete art =

Art movement emphasizing geometrical abstraction

Concrete art was an art movement with a strong emphasis on geometrical abstraction. The term was first formulated by Theo van Doesburg and was then used by him in 1930 to define the difference between his vision of art and that of other abstract artists of the time. After his death in 1931, the term was further defined and popularized by Max Bill, who organized the first international exhibition in 1944 and went on to help promote the style in Latin America. The term was taken up widely after World War 2 and promoted through a number of international exhibitions and art movements.

== Origins ==
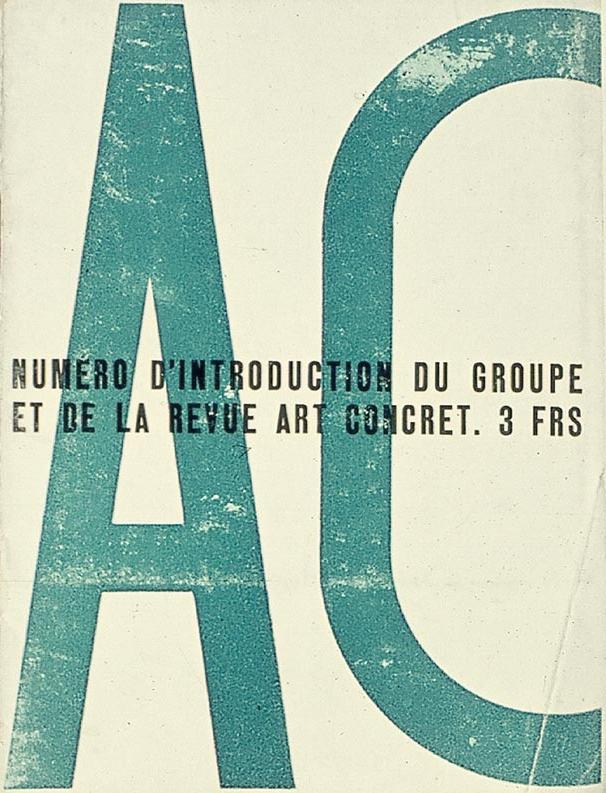
Revue Art Concret, May 1930

The term "concrete art" was first used in the 1920s in Russia, as a development of constructivism. After the formal break up of De stijl, following the last issue of its magazine in 1928, van Doesburg began considering the creation of a new collective centered on a similar approach to abstraction. In 1929 he discussed his plans with Uruguayan painter Joaquín Torres-García, with candidates for membership of this group including Georges Vantongerloo, Constantin Brâncuși, František Kupka, Piet Mondrian, Friedrich Vordemberge-Gildewart and Antoine Pevsner, among others. However, van Doesburg divided the candidates between artists whose work was still not completely abstract and those free of referentiality. As this classification entailed the possibility of a disqualification of the first group, the discussions between the two soon broke down, prompting Torres-García to team up instead with Belgian critic Michel Seuphor and form the group Cercle et Carré.

Following this, van Doesburg proceeded to propose a rival group, Art Concret, championing a geometrical abstract art closely related to the aesthetics of Neo-plasticism. In his opinion, the term 'abstract' as applied to art had negative connotations; in its place he preferred the more positive term 'concrete'. Van Doesburg was eventually joined by Otto G. Carlsund, Léon Arthur Tutundjian, Jean Hélion and his fellow lodger, the typographer Marcel Wantz (1911–1979), who soon left to take up a political career. In May 1930 they published a single issue of their own French-language magazine, Revue Art Concret, which featured a joint manifesto, positioning them as the more radical group of abstractionists.

"BASIS OF CONCRETE PAINTING
We say:

1. Art is universal.
2. A work of art must be entirely conceived and shaped by the mind before its execution. It shall not receive anything of nature's or sensuality's or sentimentality's formal data. We want to exclude lyricism, drama, symbolism, and so on.
3. The painting must be entirely built up with purely plastic elements, namely surfaces and colors. A pictorial element does not have any meaning beyond "itself"; as a consequence, a painting does not have any meaning other than "itself".
4. The construction of a painting, as well as that of its elements, must be simple and visually controllable.
5. The painting technique must be mechanic, i.e., exact, anti-impressionistic.
6. An effort toward absolute clarity is mandatory."

The group was short lived and only exhibited together on three occasions in 1930 as part of larger group exhibitions, the first being at the Salon des Surindépendents in June, followed by Production Paris 1930 in Zürich, and in August the exhibition AC: Internationell utställning av postkubistisk konst (International exhibition of post-cubist art) in Stockholm, curated by Carlsund. In the catalog to the latter, Carlsund states that the group's "programme is clear: absolute Purism. Neo-Plasticism, Purism and Constructivism combined". Shortly before van Doesburg's death in 1931, the members of the Art Concret group still active in Paris united with the larger association Abstraction-Création.

== Theoretical background ==
In 1930, Michel Seuphor had defined the role of the abstract artist in the first issue of Cercle et Carré. It was "to establish, on the foundations of a structure that is simple, severe and unadorned in every part, and within a basis of unconcealed narrow unity with this structure, an architecture which, using the technical means available to its period, expresses in a clear language that which is truly immanent and immutable." The art historian Werner Haftmann traces the development of the pure abstraction proposed by Seuphor to the synthesis of Russian Constructivism and Dutch Neo-Plasticism in the Bauhaus, where painting abandoned the artificiality of representation for technological authenticity. "In close connection with architecture and engineering, art should endeavour to give form to life itself … [The former] provided new sources of inspiration as well as new materials – steel, aluminium, glass, synthetic materials."

As van Doesburg had pointed out in his manifesto, in order to be universal, art must abandon subjectivity and find impersonal inspiration purely in the elements of which it is constructed: line, plane and color. Some later artists associated with this tendency, such as Victor Vasarély, Jean Dewasne, Mario Negro and Richard Mortensen, only came to painting after first studying science. Nevertheless, all theoretical advances seek justification in past practice, and in this case the mathematical proportions expressed in abstract form are to be identified in various art forms over millennia. Thus, argued Haftmann, "the elimination of representational images and the overt use of pure geometry do not imply a radical and definitive rejection of the great art of the past, but rather a reassertion of its eternal values stripped of their historical and social disguises."

== Development ==
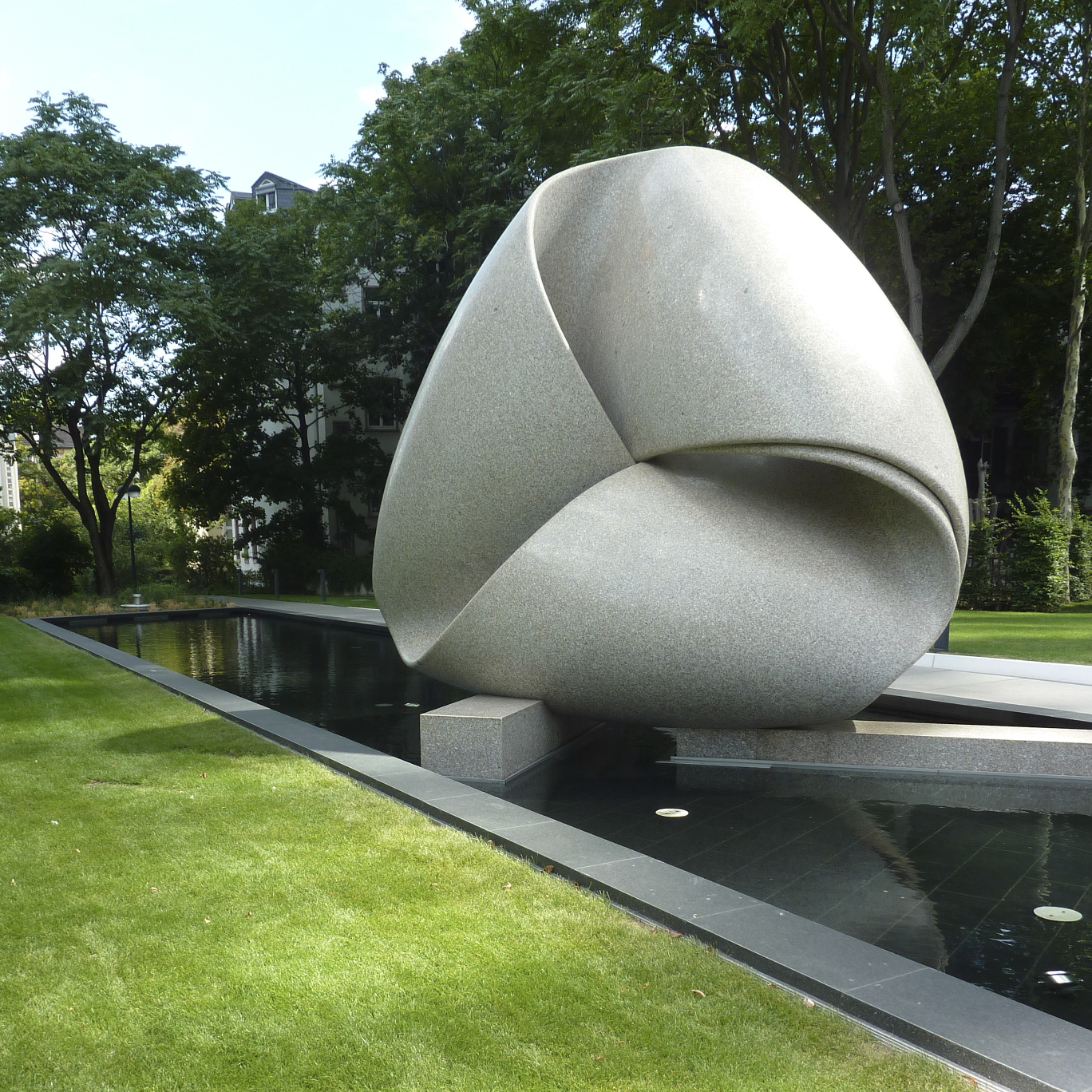
Max Bill, Continuity (Colossus of Frankfurt), 1986, collection: Deutsche Bank, Frankfurt am Main. Max Bill "was keen on creating works based on mathematical and geometric foundations—material manifestations of intellectual processes that resisted symbolism."

While Abstraction-Création was a grouping of all modernistic tendencies, there were those within it who carried the idea of mathematically inspired art and the term 'concrete art' to other countries when they moved elsewhere. A key figure among them was Joaquín Torres García, who returned to South America in 1934 and mentored artists there. Some of those went on to found the group Arte Concreto Invención in Buenos Aires in 1945. Another was the designer Max Bill, who had studied at the Bauhaus in 1927–1929. After returning to Switzerland, he helped organize the Allianz group to champion the ideals of Concrete Art. In 1944 he organized the first international exhibition in Basle and at the same time founded abstract-konkret, the monthly bulletin of the Gallerie des Eaux Vives in Zurich. By 1960 Bill was organizing a large retrospective exhibition of Concrete Art in Zürich illustrating 50 years of its development.

Abstraction, which had been quietly gathering momentum in Italy between the world wars, emerged officially in the Movimento d'arte concreta (MAC) in 1948, whose foremost exponent, Alberto Magnelli, was another past member of Abstraction-Création and had been living in France for many years. However, some seventy native painters were represented in the Arte astratta e concreta in Italia exhibition held three years later at the National Gallery in Rome. In Paris recognition of this approach resulted in several exhibitions of which the first was titled Art Concret and held at the Gallerie René Drouin during the summer of 1945. Described as "the first major post-World War 2 exhibition of abstract art", the artists exhibited there included the older generation of abstractionists: Jean Arp, Sophie Taeuber-Arp, Sonia Delaunay, César Domela, Otto Freundlich, Jean Gorin, Auguste Herbin, Wassily Kandinsky, Alberto Magnelli, Piet Mondrian, Antoine Pevsner and van Doesburg. In the following year a series of annual exhibitions began in the Salon des Réalités Nouvelles, which included some of these artists and were devoted, according to its articles of association, to "works of art commonly called: concrete art, non-figurative or abstract art".

In 1951 Groupe Espace was founded in France to harmonize painting, sculpture and architecture as a single discipline. This grouped sculptors and architects with old established artists such as Sonia Delaunay and Jean Gorin and the newly emergent Jean Dewasne and Victor Vasarély. Its manifesto was published in L'Architecture d'Aujourd'hui that year and placarded on the streets of Paris, championing the fundamental presence of the plastic arts in all aspects of life for the harmonious development of all human activities. It extended beside into practical politics, having elected as its honorary president the Minister for Reconstruction and Urban Development, Eugène Claudius-Petit.

As time progressed, a distinction began to be made between 'cold abstraction', which was identified with geometric Concrete Art, and 'warm abstraction', which, as it moved towards the various kinds of Lyrical abstraction, reintroduced personality into art. The former eventually fed into international movements building on technological aspects championed by the pioneers of Concrete Art, emerging as optical art, kinetic art and programmatic art. The term Concrete also began to be extended to other disciplines than painting, including sculpture, photography and poetry. Justification for this was theorized in South America in the 1959 Neo-Concrete Manifesto, written by a group of artists in Rio de Janeiro who included Lygia Clark, Hélio Oiticica and Lygia Pape.

Simultaneously, a distinct iteration of the movement took root in the Cuba, spearheaded by Loló Soldevilla and her partner, the painter and poet Pedro de Oraá. Their Galería Color-Luz, founded in 1957, served as the incubator for Los Diez Pintores Concretos ("The Ten"), a group dedicated to conrete art and its universal visual language. Their work combined the European approach with a distinctly Cuban use of color, lyricism, and touch.

== International dimension ==
City	Group	Year	Artists
Zurich	Die Zürcher Schule der Konkreten	1944	Max Bill, Richard Paul Lohse, Camille Graeser, Verena Loewensberg, Hans Coray, Johannes Itten, Leo Leuppi, Anton Stankowski, Carlo Vivarelli, André Evard, Hans Hinterreiter
Buenos Aires	Asociación Arte Concreto-Invención	1945	Tomás Maldonado, Lidy Prati, Alfredo Hlito, Raúl Lozza, Enio Lommi, Manuel Espinoza, Juan Melé
Buenos Aires	Movimento Madi	1946	Carmelo Arden Quin, Gyula Kosice, Rhod Rothfuss, Martín Blaszko, Diyi Laañ, Elizabeth Steiner, Juan Bay
Copenhagen	Linien II	1947	Ib Geertsen, Bamse Kragh-Jacobsen, Niels Macholm, Albert Mertz, Richard Winther, Helge Jacobsen
Milan	Movimento Arte Concreta (MAC)	1948	Atanasio Soldati, Gillo Dorfles, Bruno Munari, Gianni Monnet, Augusto Garau, Ettore Sottsass, Regina Cassolo Bracchi
Zagreb	Group Exat 51	1951	Ivan Picelj, Vjenceslav Richter, Vlado Kristl, Aleksandar Srnec, Bernardo Bernardi
Paris	Group Espace	1951	
Montevideo	Grupo de Arte No Figurativo	1952	José Pedro Costigliolo, María Freire, Antonio Llorens
Rio de Janeiro	Grupo Frente	1952	Aluísio Carvão, Carlos Val, Décio Vieira, Ivan Serpa, João José da Silva Costa, Lygia Clark, Lygia Pape, Vicent Ibberson
São Paulo	Grupo Ruptura	1952	Waldemar Cordeiro, Geraldo de Barros, Luis Sacilotto, Lothar Charroux, Kazmer Fejer, Anatol Wladslaw, Leopoldo Haar
Ulm	Hochschule für Gestaltung	1953	
Cordoba	Equipo 57	1957	Jorge Oteiza, Luis Aguilera, Ángel Duarte, José Duarte, Juan Serrano, Agustín Ibarrola
Havana	Los Diez Pintores Concretos	1957–1961	Pedro de Oraá, Loló Soldevilla, Sandú Darié, Pedro Carmelo Álvarez López, Wifredo Arrcay Ochandarena, Salvador Zacarías Corratgé Ferrera, Luis Darío Martínez Pedro, José María Mijares, Rafael Soriano López, and José Ángel Rosabal Fajardo
Padua	Gruppo N	1959	Alberto Biasi, Ennio Chiggio, Toni Costa, Edoardo Landi, Manfredo Massironi.
Milan	Gruppo T	1959	Giovanni Anceschi, Davide Boriani, Gabriele De Vecchi, Gianni Colombo, Grazia Varisco
Paris	Motus/GRAV	1960	Horacio Garcia Rossi, Julio Le Parc, François Morellet, Francisco Sobrino, Yvaral (Jean Pierre Vasarely), Joël Stein, and at the beginning also Hugo Demarco, Francisco García Miranda, Vera Molnàr, François Molnàr, Sergio Moyano Servanes,
Cleveland	Anonima Group	1960	
Rome	Gruppo Uno	1962	Gastone Biggi, Nicola Carrino, Nato Frascà, Achille Pace, Pasquale Santoro, Giuseppe Uncini
Prague	Klub konkrétistů	1967	Eduard Antal, Juraj Bartusz, Václav Cigler, František Dörfl, Jiří Hampl, Radoslav Kratina, František Kyncl, Jaroslav Malina, Eduard Ovčáček, Arsén Pohribný, Lubomír Přibyl, Tomáš Rajlich, Vladimíra Sedláková, Zdeněk Šplíchal, Karel Trinkewitz, Jiří Valoch, Miroslav Vystrčil

== Museums ==
- Haus Konstruktiv museum of constructive and concrete art in Zurich, Switzerland
- Museum of Concrete Art, Ingolstadt, Germany
- The Mondriaan House – Museum For Constructive And Concrete Art, Amersfoort, Netherlands

== Bibliography ==
- Concrete Cuba: Cuban Geometric Abstraction from the 1950s, 2016, David Zwirner Books, ISBN 9781941701331
- Dempsey, Amy. Art in the Modern Era: A Guide to Styles, Schools & Movements , NY: Harry N. Abrams Inc., 2002
- Fabre, Gladys & Doris Wintgens Hötte: Van Doesburg & the international avant-garde. Constructing a new world, London, Tate Publishing, 2010.
- Fogelström, Lollo (ed.): Otto G. Carlsund: konstnär, kritiker och utställningsarrangör, Liljevalchs konsthall, 2007.
- Gottschaller, Pia; Le Blanc, Aleca (2017). Gottschaller, Pia; Le Blanc, Aleca; Gilbert, Zanna; Learner, Tom; Perchuk, Andrew (eds.). Making Art Concrete: Works from Argentina and Brazil in the Colección Patricia Phelps de Cisneros (Exhibition catalog). Los Angeles: Getty Conservation Institute and Getty Research Institute / Getty Publications. ISBN 978-1-606-06529-7. OCLC 982373712. Wikidata ()
- Haftmann, Werner. Painting in the Twentieth Century , vol.1, second edition, London 1965 OCLC 32998790
- Heese, Luisa for the museum im Kulturspeicher Würzburg; Riese, Hans-Peter; Kunze, Franziska (2022). Konkrete Kunst in Europa nach 1945. Die Sammlung Peter C. Ruppert: Katalog für das Museum im Kulturspeicher Würzburg [Concrete Art in Europe after 1945. The Peter C. Ruppert Collection: Catalog for the Museum im Kulturspeicher Würzburg] (in German and English). Cologne: Wienand. ISBN 978-3868326086.
- Pérez-Barreiro, Gabriel; Borja-Villel, Manuel (2013). Concrete Invention: Colección Patricia Phelps De Cisneros: Reflections on Geometric Abstraction from Latin America and Its Legacy. Madrid: Museo Nacional Centro de Arte Reina Sofía/Turner. ISBN 978-8-415-42797-1. OCLC 828897697. Wikidata ()
- Stiles, Kristine, "Geometric Abstraction" in Theories and Documents of Contemporary Art, Univ California 2012, pp.77-80
