= Loló Soldevilla =

Cuban visual artist (1901–1971)

- Dolores "Loló" Soldevilla Nieto
- Born: Dolores Soldevilla Nieto; June 24, 1901; Pinar del Río, Cuba
- Died: July 5, 1971 (aged 70); Havana, Cuba
- Education: Académie de la Grande Chaumière; Atelier Jean Dewasne; Atelier Jean Pillet
- Known for: Concrete art; promotion of Cuban avant-garde; "Luminous Reliefs"
- Notable work: "Luminous Reliefs"; Ir, venir, volver a ir: crónicas; El farol
- Style: Geometric abstraction
- Movement: Concrete art
- Spouse(s): Manuel de Jesús Nazario Barba Bonen; Eusebio Mujal
- Partner: Pedro de Oraá
- Children: Haydée; Magaly; Pasto
- Parent(s): María Paula Bathilda Nieto Lannes; Raúl Soldevilla Seballos

Dolores "Loló" Soldevilla Nieto (1901–1971) was a pioneering Cuban artist, who became a central figure in the development of Concrete Art (concretismo) and a shrewd promoter of the Cuban avant-garde. The only woman in the influential group Los Diez Pintores Concretos, she was instrumental in translating European modernism into a unique Latin American visual language and served as a critical cultural bridge between Havana and the Parisian School.

== Early Life and Musical Roots ==
Born on June 24, 1901 in Pinar del Río, Cuba, Soldevilla was the third child of piano teacher María Paula Bathilda Nieto Lannes and merchant Raoúl Soldevilla Seballos. Her early environment was deeply cultured, fostering her talents in music and theater. After moving to Havana in 1911, she pursued a formal education in music. She trained as a soprano and in piano and graduated from the Falcón Conservatory in violin. In 1934, she founded the “Loló Orchestra,” an all-female ensemble with a Latin American repertoire. She directed the group and played violin, and they performed regularly in the “Aires Libres” in the cafés of the Paseo del Prado in Havana.

== Political Activism ==
Soldevilla’s commitment to social issues was a lifelong thread. During the 1930s, she was a vocal opponent of the Machado dictatorship, leading to multiple incarcerations in the Women’s Detention Center of Guanabacoa. Her political career included serving on the Executive National Committee of the Partido Aprista and being elected to the House of Representatives for the Oriente Province in 1946, and then to the House of Representatives of Cuba in 1948. She used her platform to denounce the assassination of labor leaders, propose laws for minor courts, and advocate for sugar workers' rights. In 1947, she represented Cuban women at the International Women’s Federation in Prague.

Her experience as a politician and advocate for labor rights provided her with the bureaucratic and strategic skills that would later define her success as an art impresario. In 1949, she was appointed as Cuba’s Cultural Attaché to Europe, a position that precipitated her transformation into a visual artist.

== The Parisian Transformation (1949–1956) ==
Soldevilla began painting in the late 1940s under the mentorship of Wifredo Lam, but her career found its true momentum in 1949, when, at age 48, she was appointed as the Cultural Attaché to the Cuban Embassy in France. In Paris, she immersed herself in the postwar intellectual and cultural milieu, studying sculpture at the Académie de la Grande Chaumière under Léopold Kretz and Ossip Zadkine. She joined the Atelier of Jean Dewasne and Jean Pillet and studied engraving with Stanley William Hayter and Gustavo Cochet. Throughout the early 1950s, she traveled across Europe, visiting museums with Lam and engaging with masters of abstraction. Originally working in figuration, collaborations with artists such as Victor Vasarely, Jean Arp, and Jesús Rafael Soto steered her toward an abstract and universal visual language of simple geometry.

In February 1951, acting in her dual capacity as a diplomat and artist, Soldevilla organized the landmark exhibition Art cubain contemporain (Contemporary Cuban Art) at the Musée National d’Art Moderne in Paris. Featuring 85 works by 27 artists—including Wifredo Lam, Amelia Peláez, and Carmen Herrera—the show was a watershed moment that introduced Cuban modernism to the French public. Soldevilla exhibited her own early sculptures and paintings, marking her transition into the professional art world. By securing a venue at a premier global institution, she helped dismantle parochial views of Caribbean art, positioning it as a sophisticated, universal movement. The success of this show established her as a formidable cultural bridge and set the stage for her later return to Havana, where she would later catalyze the "geometric revolution" of the late-1950s.

In 1955, Soldevilla reached a creative milestone by presenting her first "Luminous Reliefs" at the 10th Salon des Réalités Nouvelles. These innovative works incorporated electric light into abstract designs, a concept she codified in the "Light Manifesto," co-written with Eusebio Sempere in July 1955. These mark some of the earliest examples of kinetic experimentation in Cuban art. Her most radical contribution involved integrating light, shadow, and wooden tiers. These works weren't just objects to look at; they were environments that changed as the viewer moved, predating the immersive art trends of the 21st century.

Soldevilla's time in Paris and the bonds she formed with her teachers and contemporaries led to her produce her most important body of work in the years between 1950-1957. Her paintings, collages, and panel constructions from this period were defined by a restless exploration of medium, color, light, shadow, shape, and relief. Her works employ these elements in variation to suggest movement, rhythm, and personality. Soldevilla's own artistic signature was defined by a personal "hand-made" precision. Unlike the cold, industrial finish of some European Concrete artists, Soldevilla’s work retained a tactile, organic quality—a "warm abstraction" that balanced hard geometry with human intuition.

== Concrete Art and "Los Diez" ==
Returning to Havana in 1956, Soldevilla played an influential role as an artist, curator, and cultural impresario, helping to catalyze a "geometric revolution" in Cuba. First, upon arrival in Havana, she opened the monumental exhibition, Pintura de hoy (Painting of Today, Vanguard of the Paris School), which featured the work of 46 leading artists of Hard-Edge, Op Art, and Kineticism, including Jean Arp, Victor Vasarely, Sonia Delaunay, and Jesús Rafael Soto. As the first international show of abstract art in Cuba, this seminal exhibition introduced the Cuban public to this avant-garde for the first time.

In 1957, alongside her husband Pedro de Oraá, she founded Galería Color-Luz, an instrumental space for fostering the development of abstract art in Cuba and consolidating the presence of the concrete art movement on the island. The experimental gallery became the home for Los Diez Pintores Concretos (The 10 Concrete Painters; "Los Diez"), a group that established a unique language of abstraction in Cuba free from naturalism, symbolism, or standard "tropical" tropes associated with earlier Cuban modernism. As the group’s sole female member and most energetic advocate, Soldevilla championed "Concrete Art"—a term coined by Theo van Doesburg to denote art free of naturalistic associations, narrative, or sentiment. While inspired by the utopian geometry of Mondrian and the Constructivists, Soldevilla and her peers developed a distinctly Cuban variation of modernism, distinguished by a local sense of color and a lyrical, self-assured modesty.

== Later Life: Literature and Journalism ==
Following the 1959 Cuban Revolution, the artistic climate shifted. While abstraction was not explicitly censored, it was often dismissed as "out of touch" with the new social order. Despite this, Soldevilla remained tireless. She served as a professor of visual arts at the University of Havana's School of Architecture (1960-61) and designed toys. In 1964, she founded Grupo Espacio, a multidisciplinary collective, echoing the collaborative spirit of her earlier gallery. Notably, she received two public commissions to create parts of murals, both in Havana: El Mural Colectivo en Homenaje a Camilo y Che, Plaza Cadena, Universidad de la Habana (1969) and the Mural Cuba Colectiva, Salon de Mai, Pabellon (1967). Indeed, Soldevilla continued to create and exhibit her work in Cuba until her death in 1971.

The last decades of her life also saw the flourishing of her journalistic and literary pursuits. An avid writer, she wrote for several magazines and newspapers, including Granma newspaper, and wrote a memoir about her life in Paris entitled, Ir, venir, volver a ir: crónicas (1952-1957) (“Going, Coming, Going Back: Chronicles, [1952-1957]”), a novel, El farol (1964), and even a ballet.

Loló Soldevilla died on July 5, 1971 in Havana, just before a major retrospective of her work, leaving a legacy described by poet Nancy Morejón as a stone that "did not fall on a wasteland, but on water, which flows eternal."

== Personal life ==
In 1926, at the age of 25, Soldevilla married professional pianist Manuel de Jesús Nazario Barba Bonen. They had three children, Haydée, Magaly, and Pasto (who passed away at one year old). Her second marriage in 1940 was to the syndicalist Eusebio Mujal, but the couple divorced four years later due to sharp discrepancies in their political ideologies. During her transformative years in the 1950s, she found both a creative and romantic partner in fellow artist Pedro de Oraá, 30 years her junior; together, they founded the Galería Color-Luz in 1957 and became the central pillars of the Concrete Art movement in Cuba. Throughout her life, her daughter Magaly remained a close companion, accompanying her on her extensive travels across Europe as Loló Soldevilla established her international artistic reputation.

== International Recognition and Legacy ==
In the last two decades, Soldevilla's work has undergone a major international reassessment, fueled by her increasing inclusion in major exhibitions and the subject of solo shows. Her resurgence was further solidified by the 2019 retrospective Loló Soldevilla: Constructing Her Universe at the Sean Kelly Gallery in New York—the first comprehensive survey of her work in the United States—accompanied by the publication of a monograph. Today, she is recognized as a foundational pillar of Cuban geometric abstraction, and her work is increasingly featured in prominent collections outside Cuba, including the National Gallery of Art in Washington, D.C., the Museum of Fine Arts Boston, the Museo Reina Sofía in Madrid, and the Pérez Art Museum Miami.

== Selected Exhibitions ==
2025

- Faktura / Tektonika, Sean Kelly, New York (group)
- Dialogues: Women Artists in the Ella Fontanals-Cisneros Collection, Museo de Arte Contemporáneo de Monterrey Nuevo León (MARCO), Monterrey, Mexico

2024

- Los Once and los Diez, Abstract Narratives from the Cauchi Collection, Pan-American Art Projects, Miami, FL (group)
- The Vagaries of History, Museo Nacional de Bellas Artes, Havana Biennial, Cuba (group)

2023

- Telos Concreto, Galería Artiz, San Cristóbal de La Laguna, Canary Islands (group)

2022

- Abstractions Cubaines des années 1950 à nos jours, PASSERELLE Centre d’art contemporain d’intérêt national, Brest, France (group) and Tout le poids d'une île. Collectionner l'art cubain, 40mcube, Brest, France (group)
- Loló Soldevilla: Parisian Collages from 1953-1970, Rui Freire – Fine Art, Lisbon, Portugal (solo)
- Ninth Street and Beyond: 70 Years of Women in Abstraction, Hunter Dunbar, New York (group)
- A La Vuelta de los 40, Galeria Acacia, La Habana, Cuba (group)
- Abstraction, Nohra Haime Gallery, New York, NY (group)
- You Know Who You Are, El Espacio 23, Miami, Florida (group)

2021

- Dot Dot Dot… Pointalism and Beyond 1885 – 2018, Jill Newhouse Gallery, New York (group)

2020

- Dimensions of Reality: Female Minimal, Thaddaeus Ropac Paris Pantin, France Paris 1950 – 1960, Rui Freire Fine Art, Lisbon, Portugal (group)
- Women in Latin American Art, Nader Museum, Miami, FL

2019

- Major retrospective Lolo Soldevilla: Constructing Her Universe at Sean Kelly Gallery, New York. (solo)
- LINEUP, Curated by Alex Bacon, Almine Rech, New York Women Geometers, Piero Atchugarry Gallery, Miami, Florida (group)
- Women Geometers, Atchugarry Art Center, Miami, Florida (group)

2018

- 3 Concrete, Kendall Art Center, Miami, FL (group)
- Paris without Regret: Foreign Artists 1944-1968, Museo Reina Sofia, Madrid, Spain (group)
- Géométries Sud: du Mexique à la Terre de Feu, Fondation Cartier pour l’Art Contemporain, Paris, France (group).

2017

- Loló Soldevilla: De Part Concret à l’art cinétique, Cornette de Saint Cyr, Paris, France (solo)
- Triángulo – Loló Soldevilla, Sandu Darie and Carmen Herrera, organized by The Cisneros Fontanals Art Foundation (CIFO), CIFO Art Space Miami
- Adiós Utopia: Dreams and Deceptions in Cuban Art since 1950, Museum of Fine Arts, Houston, TX; Walker Art Center, Minneapolis, MN. (group)
- Construcões Sensíveis: The Latin-American Geometric Experience in the Ella Fontanals-Cisneros Collection, Centro Cultural Banco do Brasil, Rio de Janeiro and Belo Horizonte, Brazil Triángulo (group)
- Loló Soldevilla, Sandu Darie and Carmen Herrera, CIFO Art Space | The Cisneros Fontanals Art Foundation, Miami, Florida (group)

2016

- Concrete Cuba: Cuban Geometric Abstraction from the 1950s, David Zwirner's 20th Street Gallery, New York, NY (group)
- Constructivist Dialogues in the Cuban Vanguard: Amelia Peláez, Loló Soldevilla & Zilia Sánchez, Galerie Lelong, New York, Galerie Lelong, New York, NY (group)
- Beyond Borders, Museo Novecento, Florence, Italy (group)
- The Illusive Eye, El Museo del Barrio, New York (group)
- La Isla Concreta, Dan Galeria, São Paulo, Brazil (group)
- Postwar: Art between the Pacific and the Atlantic, 1945-1965, Curated by Okwui Enwezor, Katy Siegel and Ulrich Wilmes, Haus der Kunst, Munich, Germany (group)

2015

- Concrete Cuba, David Zwirner Gallery, London, UK (group)
- Soto Voce, Dominique Lévy, London, UK (group)
- Loló Soldevilla: Exposición Colección Claudio Marinelli, Museo de Arte de Pinar del Río, Cuba (solo)

2014

- Impulse, Reason, Sense, Conflict: Abstract Art from the Ella Fontanals-Cisneros Collection, Cisneros Fontanals Art Foundation, Miami, Florida (group)

2013

- Almacenes afuera, Museo Nacional de Bellas Artes, Havana, Cuba (group)

2012

- Loló en Vigía, Galeria Pedro Esquerré, Matanzas, Cuba (solo)
- Constellations: Constructivism, Internationalism, and the Inter-American Avant-Garde, Art Museum of the Americas, Washington D.C.
- Cuban Abstraction Exhibition, Pan American Projects, Miami, Florida

2011

- Loló Soldevilla Masterworks, Tresart Gallery, Coral Gables, Florida (solo)
- América fría. La abstracción geométrica en Latinoamerica (1934-1973), Fundación Juan March, Madrid, Spain

2010

- Abstractions, Pan American Art Projects, Miami, Florida (group)
- La Otra Realidad. Una historia del Arte Abstracto Cubano, Museo Nacional de Bellas Artes, Havana, Cuba (group)
- Vibración. Moderne Kunst aus Lateinamerika, The Ella Fontanals Cisneros Collection, Bundekunsthalle, Bonn, Germany (group)

2009

- Abstractomicina, Cremata Gallery, Miami, Florida (group)
- Cuba! Art and History from 1868 to today, Groninger Museum, Groningen, Holland (group)

2008

- "Cuba! Art and History from 1968 to Today," Montreal Museum of Fine Arts (MMFA), Montreal, Canada

2006

- Loló, un mundo imaginario, MNBA Museo Nacional de Bellas Artes, Havana, Cuba (solo)
- Art of Cuba, Traveling Exhibition, Brazil (group)
- Cuba: Art and Art History, Traveling Exhibition (group)

2003

- Color y Luz en Playa, Museo de la Marcha del Pueblo Combatiente, Havana, Cuba (solo)

2002

- La razón de la poesía. Diez pintores concretos cubanos, Museo Nacional de Bellas Artes, Havana, Cuba (group)

1991

- Maestros de la Pintura Cubana. Centro Provincial de Artes Plásticas y Diseño, Havana, Cuba (group)

1988

- Creadoras Cubanas: Pintura y Escultura, Museo Nacional de Bellas Artes, Havana, Cuba (group)

1982

- De Nuevo Amelia en su Galería, Galería Amelia Peláez, Parque Lenin, Havana, Cuba (group)

1971

- Loló Soldevilla, Galería del Ministerio de Salud Pública, Havana, Cuba (solo)

1970

- Casa de la Cultura Czechoslovakia, Collages, Czech Republic
- Salón 70, Museo Nacional de Bellas Artes, Havana, Cuba (group)
- Exposición de Pintura en Homenaje al 26 de Julio de Nueve Pintores Cubanos, Policlínico 15 y 18, Havana, Cuba (group)

1968

- Exposición permanente de Arte de Cuba, Galería de Arte Contemporáneo, Havana, Cuba
- Panorama del Arte en Cuba, Museo Nacional de Bellas Artes, Havana, Cuba (group)
- Pittura Cubana Oggi, Istituto Italo-Latinoamericano, Piazza Marconi, Rome, Italy (group)

1967

- Salón Nacional de Dibujo, Galería La Habana, Havana, Cuba (group)

1966

- Op art, Galería de La Habana, Consejo Nacional de Cultura, Havana, Cuba (solo)
- Pop art, Galería de La Habana, Consejo Nacional de Cultura, Havana, Cuba (solo)
- Luna y Yo (Moon and me), Galería de La Habana, Consejo Nacional de Cultura, Havana, Cuba (solo)

1965

- Grupo Espacio Expone, Galería Retiro Médico, Havana, Cuba (group)

1964

- Loló: Luz y Construcción, Regional Habana del Ministerio de la Construcción (MICONS), Havana, Cuba (solo)
- Pintura Figurativa de Loló, Regional Habana del Ministerio de la Construcción (MICONS), Havana, Cuba (solo)
- Salón Nacional, Palacio de Bellas Artes, Havana, Cuba (group)

1962

- Libertad para Siqueiros, Galería de Arte, Galiano y Concordia, Havana, Cuba (group)
- Exposición de Pintura Cubana, Organized by Consejo Nacional de Cultura, Travels to Prague, Czech Republic; Budapest, Hungary; Sofia, Bulgaria; Bucharest, Romania; Warsaw, Poland and Moscow, Russia (group)
- Exposición Primer Aniversario, Galería INIT, Hotel Habana Libre, Havana, Cuba (group)

1961

- Exposición de Pintura, Grabado y Cerámica. Primer Congreso Nacional de Escritores y Artistas Cubanos, Havana, Cuba (group)

1960

- 10 Pintores Concretos, Biblioteca Pública Ramón Guiteras, Mantazas, Cuba
- Libertad para Siqueiros, Seguro Médico Building, Havana, Cuba

1959

- Loló. Pinturas recientes de Loló Soldevilla, Galería de La Habana, Havana, Cuba (solo)
- Artes Plásticas al Pueblo de Cuba, Women’s Club de la Habana, Cuba (group)
- Salón Annual 1959. Pintura, Escultura y Grabado, Museo Nacional de Bellas Artes, Havana, Cuba (group)
- 10 Pintores Concretos Exponen Pinturas y Dibujos, Galería de Arte Color Luz, Havana, Cuba (group)

1958

- Exposición de Pinturas Recientes de Loló Soldevilla, Galería de Arte Color Luz, Havana, Cuba (solo)
- 8 Pintores Cubanos. Oleos, Guache, Dibujos y Collages, Centro de Bellas Artes y Letras, Caracas, Venezuela (group)
- El Arte Abstracto en Europa, Galería de Arte Color Luz, Havana, Cuba
- Exposición Aniversario. Pintura y Escultura Cubana 1958, Galería de Arte Color Luz, Havana, Cuba (group)

1957–1961

- A, Feria del Arte Cubano, Cuba (group)

1957

- Loló, Galerie La Roue, Paris, France (solo)
- Loló 1953 –1957, Sala de Exposiciones del Centro Profesional del Este, Caracas, Venezuela (solo)
- Pintura y Escultura Cubana, Galería de Arte Color Luz, Havana, Cuba (solo)
- Collage, Poemas-Collages, Galería Sardio, Caracas, Venezuela (group)
- Homenaje al pequeño cuadro, Galerie de Arte Color Luz, Havana, Cuba (group)
- Muestra de Pintura Abstracta Contemporánea, Caraqueña Galería Cruz del Sur, Caracas, Venezuela (group)
- Pintura y Escultura Cubana 1957, Exposición Inaugural, Galería de Arte Color Luz, Miramar, Havana, Cuba (group)
- Pintura Cubana. Dibujos, Oleos, Guache y Collages, Ateneo de Valencia, Venezuela (group)

1956

- Painting Today: The Vanguard of the School of Paris, Palace of Fine Arts, Havana, Cuba (solo)
- Loló. Óleos, collages, relieves, luminosos 1953-56, Museo Nacional de Bellas Artes, Havana, Cuba (solo)
- Loló Soldevilla, Galería Cubana, Havana, Cuba (solo)
- Pinturas, Galería Cubana, Havana, Cuba (solo)
- VIII Salón Nacional. Pintura y Escultura, Museo Nacional de Bellas Artes, Havana, Cuba (group)
- El Tema Religioso en la Pintura Cubana, Galería Cubana, Havana, Cuba (group)
- Pintura de Hoy. Vanguardia de la Escuela de Paris, Museo Nacional de Bellas Artes, Havana, Cuba (group)

1955

- Luminous Reliefs, Réalités Nouvelles, Paris, France (solo)
- Loló Collages, Galerie La Roue, Paris, France (solo)
- Loló Soldevilla, Auvers-Sur-Oise, France (solo)
- 10ème Salon des Réalités Nouvelles, Musée d’Art Moderne de la Ville de Paris, France (group)
- Artistes Étrangers en France, Sponsored by the Ville de Paris, Petit Palais, France (group)
- Loló Soldevilla/Eusebio Sempere, Circulo de la Univeridad de Valencia, Valenica, Spain (group)
- Salon L’Avant-Garde de L’École de Paris, Palais du Centre Des Asturies, Paris, France (group)

1954

- 9ème Salon des Réalitiés Nouvelles, Musée d’Art Moderne de la Ville de Paris, Paris, France (group)
- A collage group exhibition with Vasarely, Seuphor, Koeing et al., Galerie Arnaud, Paris, France (group)
- Pinturas, Esculturas, Collages, y Dibujos de Loló Soldevilla y Eusebio Sempere, Club Universitario, Valencia, Spain (group)

1953

- Loló, Galerie Allard, Maison des Intellectuels, Paris, France (solo)
- Loló, Galería Palacio de Santa Cruz, Valladolid, Spain (solo)
- Loló Soldevilla, Galerie Arnaud, Paris, France (solo)
- VI Salón Nacional de Pintura y Escultura, Salones del Capitolio Nacional, Havana, Cuba (group)
- 8ème Salon des Réalitiés Nouvelles, Musée d’Art Moderne de la Ville de Paris, Paris, France (group)
- Group exhibition, Galerie Allard, Maison des Intellectuels, Paris, France (group)
- Fer Mobiles. Moreno/Soldevilla/Rincón/Varela, Galerie Saint Jacques, Paris, France (group)
- Loló/Varela, Arnaud Gallery, Paris, France (group)
- Quelques Femmes Peintre (Some Women Painters), Galerie Olga Bogroff, Paris, France (group)

1952

- Sociedad Cultural Nuestro Tiempo, Havana, Cuba (solo)
- Palacio de Sanata Cruz, Madrid, Spain (solo)
- Loló Soldevilla: Metal Sculptures and Collages, Galerie Olga Bogroff, Paris, France (solo)
- Loló, Pintura y Escultura 1951-1952, Palacio de los Trabajadores, Havana, Cuba (solo)
- Loló Soldevilla, La Cabeza: A través de la Imaginación y la Realidad, Nuestro Tiempo, Havana, Cuba (solo)
- 7éme Salon des Réalités Nouvelles, Musée d’Art Moderne de la Ville de Paris, France (group)

1951

- Art cubain contemporain, (organized by Loló Soldevilla) Musée National d’Art Moderne, Paris, France (group)
- 20 óleos de Loló, Universidad de Havana, Havana, Cuba (solo)
- Esculturas, Galería de Matanzas, Mantanzas, Cuba (group)

1950

- Loló. Sculptures, Lyceum of Havana, Havana, Cuba (solo)
- Loló 20 oil paintings, School of Law at the University of Havana, Havana, Cuba (solo)
- Dolores Soldevilla. Loló Esculturas. Lyceum and Lawn Tennis Club, Havana, Cuba (solo)
- Jubilée International, Cité Universitarie, Paris, France (group)
- Les Surindépendants, Paris, France (group)
- Salon d’Automne, de peintre Esculpteurs Entrangers, Académie des beaux-arts, Paris, France (group)

1949

- Salon d'art Monaco, France, (solo)
- Academy of Fine Arts, Paris, France (solo)

== Notable Works in Public Collections ==
- Museo Nacional de Bellas Artes (MNBA), Havana
  - The most significant repository of her work, containing her early sculptures, major "Concrete" paintings from the 1950s, and the Relieves Luminosos (Light Reliefs).
- National Library of Cuba (Biblioteca Nacional José Martí), Havana
  - Holds several of her published literary works and graphic designs.
- Untitled, (1955). National Gallery of Art, Washington, DC.
- Día y noche (Day and Night), (1955). Museum of Fine Arts, Boston, Massachusetts
- Sin título [Untitled from the series Cartas celestiales (Celestial Letters)], 1957. Pérez Art Museum Miami, Miami, Florida
- Untitled, bronze mobile, 1954, El Museo del Barrio, New York, NY
- The Rodriguez Collection at the Kendall Art Center, Miami, Florida
- Untitled (1955). Museo de arte Latinoamericano de Buenos Aires (MALBA)
- Cornell Fine Arts Museum, Rollins College, Orlando, Florida
- Museo Novecento, Florence, Italy

== Private/Foundation Collections ==
- The Cisneros Fontanals Art Foundation (CIFO), Miami, Florida
- Ella Fontanals-Cisneros Collection
- Jorge Pérez Collection, Miami, Florida
- Claudio Marinelli Collection
- François Vallée Collection
- Tanya Capriles Brillembourg Collection
- Juan Carlos Maldonado Collection
