= Wifredo Lam =

Cuban artist (1902–1982)

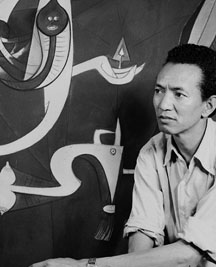
- From José Gómez-Sicre photographic archives
- Born: Wifredo Óscar de la Concepción Lam y Castilla; December 8, 1902; Sagua La Grande, Cuba
- Died: September 11, 1982 (aged 79); Paris, France
- Known for: Painting
- Notable work: The Jungle (1943), Museum of Modern Art collection.
- Spouse(s): Eva Piriz (1929–1931; her death); Helena Holzer (1944–1950); Lou Laurin (1960–1982; his death, 3 sons)
- Children: 4
- Awards: Guggenheim International Award

Lam's Zambezia, Zambezia, oil on canvas, 1950, Solomon R. Guggenheim Museum

Wifredo Óscar de la Concepción Lam y Castilla (Chinese: 林飛龍; Jyutping: lam4 fei1lung4; December 8, 1902 – September 11, 1982), better known as Wifredo Lam, was a Cuban artist who sought to portray and revive the enduring Afro-Cuban spirit and culture. Inspired by and in contact with some of the most renowned artists of the 20th century, including Pablo Picasso, Henri Matisse, Frida Kahlo, and Diego Rivera, Lam melded his influences and created a unique style, which was ultimately characterized by the prominence of hybrid figures. This distinctive visual style of his also influenced many artists. Though he was predominantly a painter, he also worked with sculpture, ceramics, and printmaking in his later life.

== Early life ==
Wifredo Lam was born and raised in Sagua La Grande, a village in the sugar farming province of Villa Clara, Cuba. He was of mixed-race ancestry: his mother, the former Ana Serafina Castilla, was born to a Congolese former slave mother and a Cuban mulatto father and his father, Yam Lam, was a Chinese immigrant. In Sagua La Grande, Lam was surrounded by many people of African descent; his family, like many others, practiced Catholicism alongside their African traditions. Through his godmother, Matonica Wilson, a Santería priestess locally celebrated as a healer and sorceress, he was exposed to rites of the African orishas. While Lam was never initiated into Santería, Palo Monte, or Abakuá Secret Society, he was familiar with the practices, as cultural participation was widespread in Cuba. His contact with African celebrations and spiritual practices proved to be his largest artistic influence.

Lam"s father, Enrique Lam-Yam, was a Chinese immigrant from Canton (Guangdong province) who came to Cuba as part of the late-19th-century wave of Chinese laborers and merchants. Enrique was in his fifties when Wifredo was born and remained an important presence in the family home in Sagua la Grande, a town with an active Chinese community.

Lam grew up surrounded by Chinese objects—porcelain, calligraphy, ornamental screens—that were common in Cuban-Chinese households. Scholars note that some of his later abstract, calligraphic lines and mask-like faces echo Chinese brushwork and scroll composition.

Though Lam never practiced Chinese religion, he absorbed a respect for ancestor veneration and an interest in hybrid spiritual systems. His later embrace of Afro-Cuban Santería and Taoist-like ideas of balance shows a comfort with syncretism that mirrors his mixed heritage.

Lam often spoke of being "a mulatto" of many worlds—African, Spanish, Chinese. His father"s Asian heritage helped form his lifelong fascination with mestizaje (cultural mixing), which became a key theme of his art.

In 1916, Lam moved to Havana to study law, a path that his family had thrust upon him. Simultaneously he also began studying tropical plants at the Botanical Gardens. From 1918 to 1923, Lam studied painting at the Escuela de Bellas Artes. However, he disliked both academic teaching and painting. He left for Madrid, Spain, in the autumn of 1923 to further his art studies.

== Career in Europe ==
In 1923, Lam began studying in Madrid under Fernando Álvarez de Sotomayor y Zaragoza, the curator of the Museo del Prado and teacher of Salvador Dalí. In the mornings he would attend his conservative teacher's studio, while he spent his evenings working alongside young, nonconformist painters. At the Prado, he discovered and was awed by the work of Hieronymus Bosch and Pieter Bruegel I. While Lam's early paintings were in the modernist Spanish tradition, his work soon became more simplified and decorative. Though his dislike for academic conservatism persisted, his time in Spain marked his technical development, in which he began to merge a primitive aesthetic and the traditions of Western composition. It was in Paris that Lam was exposed to conventions of African sculpture. In 1929, he married Eva Piriz, but both she and their young son died in 1931 of tuberculosis; it is likely that this personal tragedy contributed to the dark nature of his work.

During the 1930s, Lam was exposed to a variety of influences. The influence of Surrealism was discernible in his work, as well as that of Henri Matisse. Lam had begun to incorporate Surrealist techniques before his time in Europe, learning of artists like Matisse through publications and news from a friend. Throughout Lam's travels through the Spanish countryside, he developed empathy for the Spanish peasants, whose troubles in some ways mirrored those of the former slaves he grew up around in Cuba. At the outbreak of the Spanish Civil War, he sided with the Republicans in 1936–1937 and used his talent to fashion Republican posters and propaganda. Drafted to defend Madrid, Lam was incapacitated during the fighting in late 1937 and was sent to Barcelona. There he met Helena Holzer, a German researcher, and the Catalan artist known as Manolo Hugué. Manolo gave Lam the letter of introduction that sparked his friendship with Picasso, whose artwork had impressed and inspired Lam a year before when he saw an exhibition in Madrid.

In 1938, Lam moved to Paris. He quickly gained the support of Picasso, who introduced him to many of the leading artists of the time, such as Fernand Léger, Henri Matisse, Georges Braque and Joan Miró. He also befriended the poet Mary Stanley Low. In his trip to Mexico in the same year, Lam stayed with Frida Kahlo and Diego Rivera.

Picasso also introduced him to Pierre Loeb, a Parisian art dealer; Loeb gave Lam his first exhibition at the Galerie Pierre Loeb in 1939, which received an enthusiastic response from critics. Picasso and Lam also exhibited their work together at the Perls Galleries in New York in the same year. Lam's work went from showing the influence of Matisse, seen in his still lifes, landscapes and simplified portraits, to being influenced by Cubism. Mainly working with gouache, Lam began producing stylized figures that appear to be influenced by Picasso. Much of his work in 1938 possessed emotional intensity; the subject matter ranged from interacting couples to women in despair and showed a considerably stronger African influence, seen in the figures' angular outlines and the synthesis of their bodies.

While Lam began simplifying his forms before he came into contact with Picasso's work, it is apparent that Picasso had a significant impact on him. With regard to Picasso's exhibition, Lam said that it was "not only a revelation, but… a shock." Lam gained the approval of Picasso, whose encouragement has been said to have led Lam to search for his own interpretation of modernism.

With the outbreak of World War II and the invasion of Paris by the Germans, Lam left for Marseille, France, in 1940. There he rejoined many intellectuals, including the Surrealists, with whom he had been associated since he met André Breton in 1939. While in Marseille, Lam and Breton collaborated on the publication of Breton's poem Fata Morgana, which was illustrated by Lam. Though the drawings he created in Marseille between 1940 and 1941 are known as the Fata Morgana suite, only about three inspired the illustrations for the poem. In 1941, Breton, Lam and Claude Lévi-Strauss, accompanied by many others, left for Martinique, only to be imprisoned. After forty days, Lam was released and allowed to leave for Cuba, which he reached in midsummer 1941.

== Havana years ==
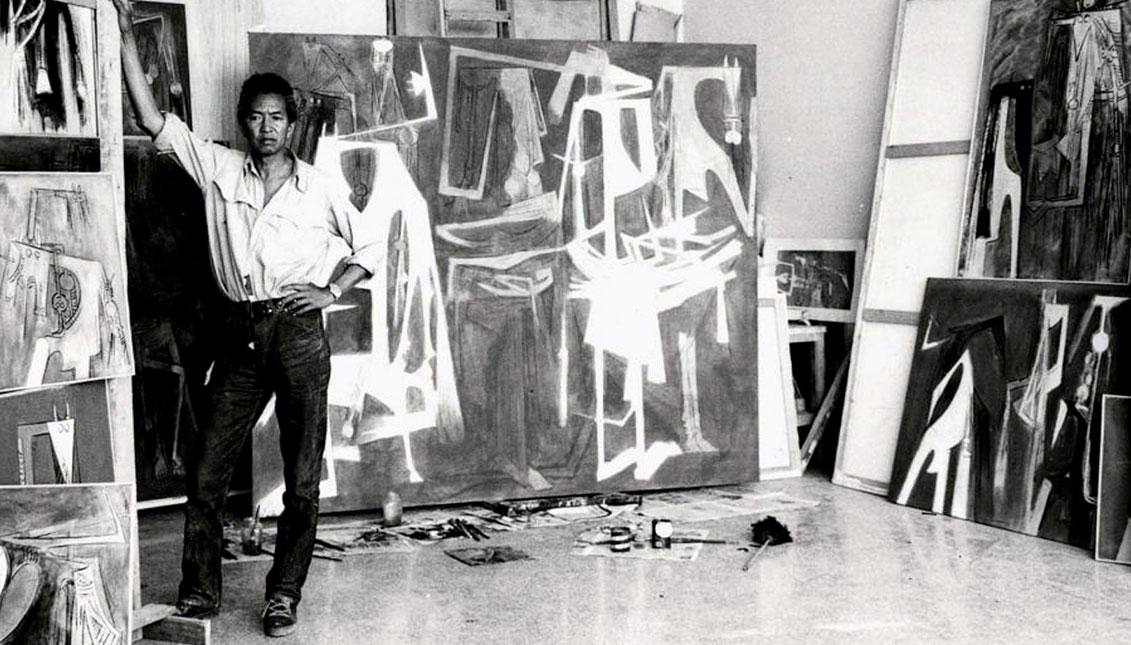
Lam in his studio, 1964

Upon his return to Havana, Lam developed a new awareness of Afro-Cuban traditions. He noticed that the descendants of the slaves were still being oppressed and that the Afro-Cuban culture was degraded and made picturesque for the sake of tourism. He believed that Cuba was in danger of losing its African heritage and therefore sought to free them from cultural subjugation. In an interview with Max-Pol Fouchet, he said:

"I wanted with all my heart to paint the drama of my country, but by thoroughly expressing the negro spirit, the beauty of the plastic art of the blacks. In this way I could act as a Trojan horse that would spew forth hallucinating figures with the power to surprise, to disturb the dreams of the exploiters."

Additionally, his time in Cuba marked a rapid evolution of his style. Drawing from his study of tropical plants and familiarity with Afro-Cuban culture, his paintings became characterized by the presence of a hybrid figure—part human, part animal, and part vegetal. His style was also distinctive because of its fusion of Surrealist and Cubist approaches with imagery and symbols from Santería. In 1943, he began his best-known work, The Jungle. It reflected his mature style, depicting four figures with mask-like heads, half-emerging from dense tropical vegetation. Later that year it was shown in an exhibition at the Pierre Matisse Gallery in New York, where it created controversy. The painting depicted the tension between Modernism and the vibrancy and energy of African culture. The Jungle was ultimately purchased by the Museum of Modern Art in New York. It is often compared to Picasso's Guernica, which is hung in the Museo Reina Sofía in Madrid.

Another work of Picasso's that has been compared to The Jungle is Les Demoiselles d'Avignon. Although these two paintings were created thirty-six years apart and have different cultural contexts, they both depict women in a sexualized context and both contain primitivist and Cubist elements in their designs.

The combination of African ideas with a European style in Lam's work, The Jungle led to Lam and his second wife experiencing discrimination from the largely nonwhite Cuban population. Upon his return to Cuba, Lam moved away from the cosmopolitan art community and experimented more with Cuban avant-garde styles. Cuban artists have accused Lam of being an impostor when it comes to his artwork and his identity as a Cuban.

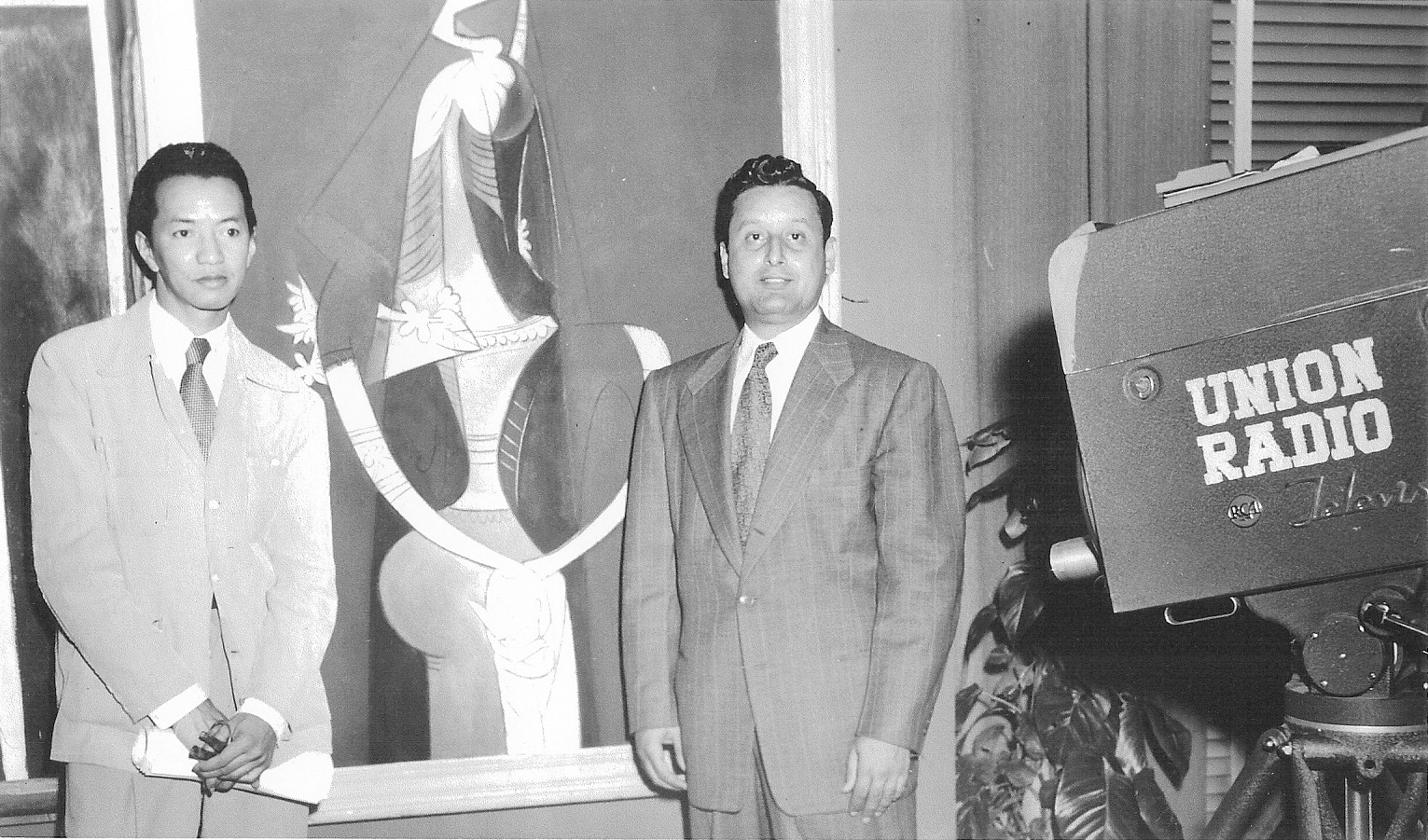
Lam with fellow artist Manuel Carbonell (1952)

Lam continued to simplify and synthesize abstraction yet continued painting figurally; he also kept on developing the mythology and totemism that defined his style. In 1944, he married Helana Holzer, whom he divorced in 1950. In 1946, he and Breton spent four months in Haiti. There Lam enriched his already extensive understanding and knowledge of African divinity and magic rituals through observing Voodoun ceremonies, although he later said that his contact with the African spirituality that he found throughout the Americas did not directly impact his formal style. African poetry, on the other hand, was said to have had a broadening effect on his paintings. In 1950, he worked with René Portocarrero and others; in the village of Santiago de Las Vegas, the group of painters worked on ceramic. Lam settled in Paris in 1952 after having divided his time between Cuba, New York, and France.

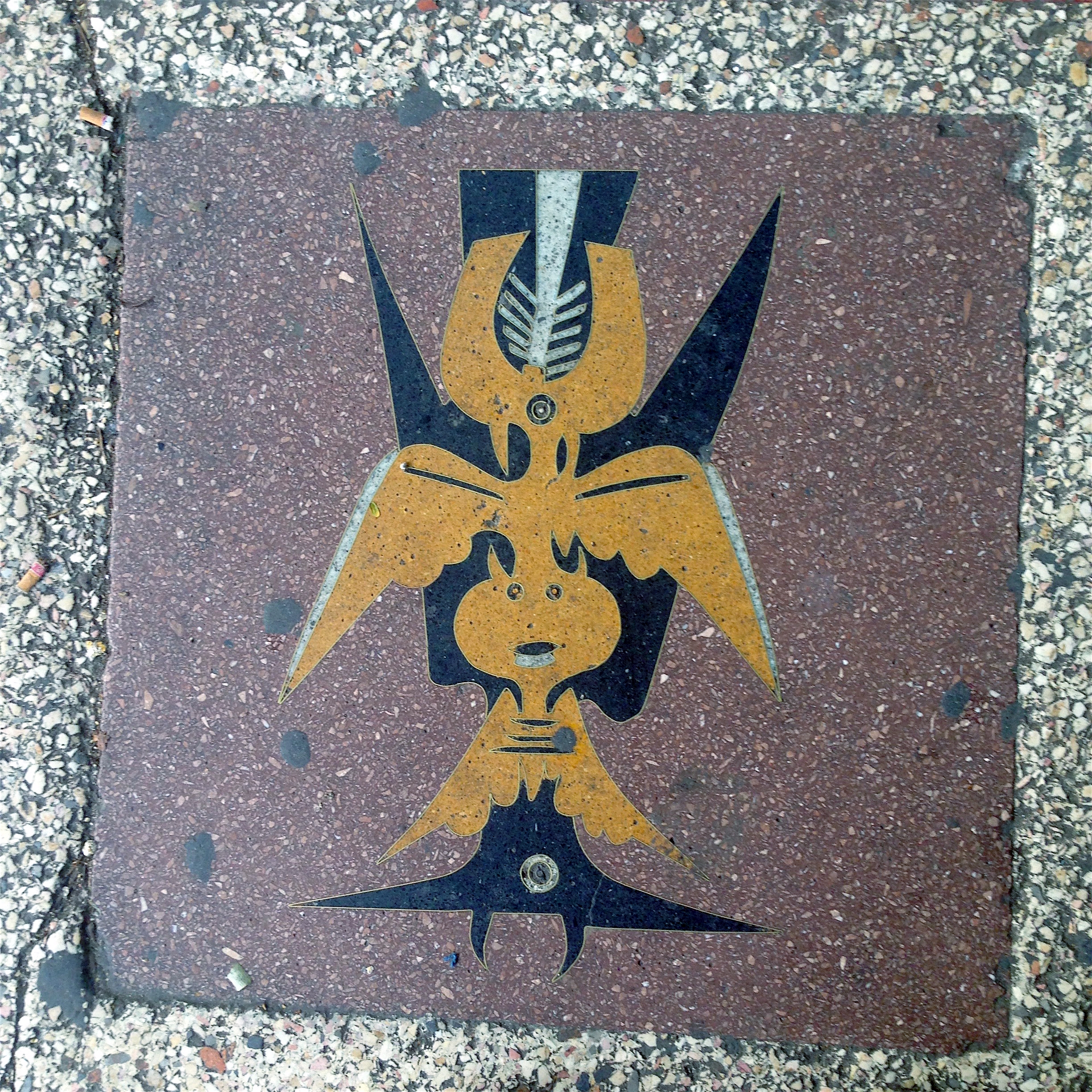
Salón de Mayo, 1967. Sidewalk insert in front of the Radiocentro CMQ Building by Wifredo Lam.

Lam, who continued to sympathize with the common man, exhibited a series of paintings at Havana University in 1955 to demonstrate his support for the students' protests against Batista's dictatorship. Similarly, in 1965, six years after the revolution, he showed his loyalty to Castro and his goals of social and economic equality by painting El Tercer Mundo (The Third World) for the presidential palace. In 1960, Lam established a studio in Albissola Marina on Italy's northwest coast and settled there with his wife Lou Laurin, a Swedish painter, and their three sons. In 1964, he was awarded the Guggenheim International Award and between 1966 and 1967 there were many retrospectives of his work throughout Europe. At the encouragement of Asger Jorn and after being intrigued by the local pottery-making, Lam began to experiment with ceramics and had his first ceramic exhibition in 1975. He progressed to model sculptures and cast in metal in his twilight years, often depicting personages similar to those he had painted.

Wifredo Lam died on September 11, 1982, in Paris, aged 79. Having had more than one hundred personal exhibitions around the world, Lam had a well established reputation by the time of his death.

== Legacy ==
Lam, like many of the most renowned artists of the 20th century, combined radical modern styles with the "primitive" arts of the Americas. While Diego Rivera and Joaquín Torres García drew inspiration from Pre-Columbian art, Lam was influenced by the Afro-Cubans of that time. He dramatically synthesized the Surrealist and Cubist strategies while incorporating the iconography and spirit of Afro-Cuban religion. For that reason, his work does not belong to any particular art movement.

He held the belief that society focused too much on the individual and sought to show humanity as a whole in his artwork. He painted generic figures, creating the universal. To further his goal, he often painted mask-like faces. While Cuban culture and mythology permeated his work, it dealt with the nature of man and therefore was wholly relatable to non-Cubans.

Beyond his own stylistic synthesis, Lam"s influence was felt personally by contemporary Cuban artists; including Roberto Diago, Jorge Camacho, the "Los Once" group ("The Eleven"), and he was a key early mentor to Dolores "Loló" Soldevilla a pioneer of Cuban Concrete Art.

Opened in 1983, the Wifredo Lam Center for Contemporary Art (in Spanish: Centro de Arte Contemporáneo Wifredo Lam) is a state-run gallery in tribute to Lam and located in Havana, Cuba. This art gallery is responsible for the organization of the Bienal de la Habana, Cuba, a permanent art collection of approx. 1000 works, and research and study of contemporary visual arts in developing countries.

In 2015, a retrospective exhibition of his works opened at the Centre Georges Pompidou in Paris, set to travel to the Reina Sofia Museum in Spain and the Tate Museum in London afterwards.

In 2019, his work was included in the group show The Gift of Art, at Pérez Art Museum Miami. The exhibition highlighted important artworks within PAMM's permanent collection on Latinx and Latin American artists. Among the artists featured in the exhibition were José Bedia (Cuba), Teresa Margolles (Mexico), Roberto Matta (Chile), Oscar Murillo (Colombia), Amelia Peláez (Cuba), Zilia Sánchez (Cuba), Tunga (Brazil), and Carmen Herrera (Cuba).

From November 10, 2025–April 11, 2026, the Museum of Modern Art exhibited Wifredo Lam: When I Don"t Sleep, I Dream, Museum of Modern Art, New York City, Lam"s first retrospective in the United States.

== The Jungle ==
Wifredo Lam, The Jungle, gouache on paper, 1943, Museum of Modern Art

The Jungle, which is considered Lam's masterpiece, is exemplary of the artist's mature style. The polymorphism, for which Lam is well known, juxtaposes aspects of humans, animals, and plants, creating monstrous, hybrid creatures. This merging of human, animal, and plant forms is described as magical metamorphosis. Scholars have hypothesized that these figures originated from Lam's subconscious, connecting the artwork to Surrealist principles. The dense composition creates a claustrophobic feeling while the forms remain difficult to differentiate. Scholars attribute this abstract construction of figures to the Cubist art style.

=== Elements of the painting ===
The four figures' elongated limbs lack definition, while much emphasis is placed on body parts, such as their large feet, round buttocks and breasts, and images under two of the figures' mouths that Adrían claims resemble male genitalia. There are also African-inspired masked heads; scholars report that Lam was interested the carvings on African masks. Additionally, the iridescent quality of the forms enhances the painting's tropical feeling. The imagery of the tropics is also suggested with the densely packed cane stalks and palm leaves that merge with the figures, mirroring cosmological concepts from Afro-Cuban religions where deities that inhabit elements in nature. The sugarcane in the painting is suggested to allude to the fields in which African slaves owned by the Spanish and Portuguese worked. The figure on the far right holding the shears is thought to be harvesting the sugarcane and figure on the far left resembles a horse and is suspected to represent a figure from Afro-Cuban mythology. Although the sugarcane provides some potential context to the artwork, there is no specific geographic location where The Jungle is supposed to occur. Scholars suggest that this lack of specificity orients the artwork towards a more universal audience.

The somber palette containing a mixture of blue, green, yellow, and white suggests a hidden moonlit scene, perhaps a reference to the secret practice of African religions among enslaved peoples. The usage of color in The Jungle can also be viewed as occurring during the day in depths of a jungle. Furthermore, historians suggest that the usage of red and orange in the color palette represent blood.

=== Cultural context ===
The Jungle was not, however, intended to describe the primitivism of Cuba. Rather, Lam's intention was to depict a spiritual state—which is surely inspired by Santería; he sheds light on the absurdity that has become Afro-Cuban culture and more specifically on the way Afro-Cuban traditions were cheapened for tourism. Specifically, Caribbean and Atlantic studies scholar Francisco-J. Hernández Adrián suggests that The Jungle serves as a critique of the exoticizing lens placed on the Atlantic as a byproduct of the colonial era. He sought to describe the reality of the Afro-Cuban experience of his time and gained acclaim and fame for doing so. The artwork is suggested to have challenged the colonial viewpoint. Furthermore, Hernández Adrián claims that the imagery of the artwork reflects the constant struggles black people faced in Cuban society. Specifically, one of the central struggles in the artwork is the slave labor suggested by the sugar cane in The Jungle. Art historian Doris Maria-Reina Bravo argues that the intensive labor in which many had to participate in Cuba as suggested by the artwork strongly differs from the way tourists viewed Cuba. She claims that during the time of the artwork's creation, tourists viewed Cuba as a "playground".

== Art market ==
On December 6, 2017, Sotheby's sold Lam's A Trois Centimetres de la Terre (1962) for €4.44m ($5.24m), which established a new record price for the painter. The work was sold as part of the Alain and Candice Fraiberger collection. The previous record for the artist was set in May 2012, when Idolo (Oya/Divinit de l'air de la mort) sold for $4.56m. A new record was established on June 28, 2020, when Sotheby's auctioned Lam's "Omi Obini" for $9,603,800.

== Works in public collections ==
- Doble desnudo II – mujeres recostadas (Double Nude II – Reclining Women), 1937, pastel and gouache on paper on canvas, 100 x 123 cm., Pérez Art Museum Miami
- Anamu, 1942, oil on canvas, 152 x 127 cm., Museum of Contemporary Art, Chicago
- Satan. 1942, gouache on paper, 106 x 86 cm., Museum of Modern Art, New York
- La jungla (The Jungle), 1942–43, oil and charcoal on paper mounted on canvas, 239 x 229 cm., Museum of Modern Art, New York
- Untitled, 1943, oil on burlap, 61 x 78 cm., Museum of Fine Arts, Boston
- Homenaje a jicotea, ca. 1943, Lowe Art Museum, University of Miami
- La Présence éternelle (The Eternal Presence), 1944, oil, pastel, papier mâché, chalk ground on bast fiber fabric, 216 x 196 cm., Museum of Art, Rhode Island School of Design, Providence
- La Chevelure (The Mane), 1945, oil and charcoal on canvas, 73 x 60 cm., Pérez Art Museum Miami
- Damballah, 1945 – 1946, oil on canvas, 125 x 153 cm., National Gallery of Victoria, Melbourne
- Le Reve (The Dream), 1947, oil on canvas, 77 x 102 cm., Hirshhorn Museum and Sculpture Garden, Smithsonian Institution
- Nativité (Nativity), 1947, oil on canvas, 218 x 101 cm., Museo Nacional Centro de Arte Reina Sofía, Madrid
- Trópico (Tropic), 1947, oil on canvas, 127 × 157 cm., Los Angeles County Museum of Art
- Un Coq pour Chango (A Rooster for Shango), 1947, oil on burlap, 106 × 89 cm., San Francisco Museum of Modern Art
- Exodo. 1948. Howard University Gallery of Art, Washington, D.C.
- L'esprit aveugle (The Blind Soul), 1948, oil on canvas, 72 x 83 cm., Indianapolis Museum of Art
- Arpas cardinales (Cardinal Harps ), 1948-57, oil and charcoal on canvas, 212 × 196 cm., The Menil Collection, Houston
- Ibaye, 1950, oil on canvas, 104 × 87 cm., Tate Modern, London
- Seuil (Threshold), 1950, oil on canvas, 185 x 170 cm., Musée Nationale d"Art Moderne Paris
- Mother and Child, 1957, charcoal and pastel on paper, 73 × 58 cm., Art Institute of Chicago, Chicago
- Près des Îles Vierges (Near the Virgin Islands), 1959, oil, charcoal, and pastel on canvas, 208 x 190 cm., Museum of Art, Rhode Island School of Design, Providence
- L'indésirable (The Undesirable), 1962, oil on canvas, 146 x 215 cm., Musée d'Art Moderne de Paris
- Les enfants sans âme, 1964, Museum of Modern Art, Brussels
- El Tercer Mundo (The Third World), 1965 – 1966, oil on canvas, 251 x 300 cm., Museo Nacional de Bellas Artes, Havana

== Exhibitions ==
- "Wifredo Lam Peintures." Galerie Pierre, Paris. June 30–July 14, 1939.
- "Drawings by Picasso and Gouaches by Wifredo Lam." Perls Gallery, New York. November 13–December 2, 1939.
- "Lam Paintings." Pierre Matisse Gallery, New York. November 17–December 5, 1942.
- "Lam Paintings." Pierre Matisse Gallery, New York. June 6–24, 1944.
- "Lam Paintings." Pierre Matisse Gallery, New York. November 20–December 8, 1945.
- "Wifredo Lam." Galerie Pierre, Paris. December 12–31, 1945.
- "Lam" Centre d'Art Galerie, Port-au-Prince, Haïti, January 24–February 3, 1946.
- "The Cuban Painter Wifredo Lam." The London Gallery, London. November 5–30, 1946.
- "Lam: Obras Recientes 1950." Parque Central, Havana. October 2–15, 1950.
- "Wifredo Lam." Museo de Bellas Artes, Caracas, May 8–22, 1955.
- "Wifredo Lam." University of Notre Dame, Notre Dame, January 8–22, 1961.
- "Wifredo Lam Malerei, Vic Gentils Bildhauerei." Kunsthalle, Basel, September 10–October 9, 1966; "Wifredo Lam." Kestnergesellschaft, Hanover, December 16, 1966–January 16, 1967; Stedelijk Museum, January 26–March 12, 1967; Moderna Museet, Stockholm, April 8–May 7, 1967; Palais des Beaux-Arts, Brussels, May 18–June 18, 1967.
- "Wifredo Lam." Ordrupgaard, Charlottenlund (Denmark), September 14–October 15, 1978; Sonja Henie, Niels Onstad Foundation, Høvikkoden (Norway).
- "Homenaje a Wifredo Lam 1902–1982." Museo Nacional de Arte Contemporaneo, Madrid, October 20–December 12, 1982; Musée d'Ixelles, Brussels, January 7–March 6, 1983; Musée d'Art Moderne de la Ville de Paris, Paris, March 23–May 22, 1983.
- "Wifredo Lam, Prints." Central Institute of Fine Arts, Beijing; Palace of Fine Arts, Shanghaï; Institute of Fine Arts, Hangzhou, Institute of Fine Arts; Guangzhou; Art Center, Hong Kong, September 1991–March, 1992.
- "Wifredo Lam: A Retrospective of Works on Paper." Americas Society, New York, September 19–December 20, 1992; Fundacio La Caixa, Barcelona, January 21–March 21, 1993.
- "Wifredo Lam." Museo Nacional Centreo de Arte Reina Sofia, Madrid, September 29–December 14, 1992; Fundacio Miró, Barcelona, January, 21–March 21, 1993.
- "Lam métis." Fondation Dapper, Paris, September 26, 2001–January 20, 2002.
- "Wifredo Lam: The Changing Image, Centennial Exhibition." Yokohama Museum of Art, Yokohama, October 2002–January 2003.
- "Wifredo Lam et les poètes." Musée Campredon, Maison René Char, L'Isle sur la Sorgue, France, July 7–October 2, 2005.
- "Wifredo Lam in North America," Haggerty Museum of Art, Marquette University, Milwaukee October 11, 2007–January 21, 2008; Miami Art Museum, Miami, February 8–May 18, 2008; Museum of Latin American Art, Long Beach, June 12–August 31, 2008; Dalí Museum, St Petersburg (FL), October 2, 2008–January 10, 2009.
- "Wifredo Lam, gravuras," Caixa Cultural de Rio de Janeiro, Rio de Janeiro, October 22–January 3, 2010; Pinacoteca de Estado, São Paulo, February 27–May 2, 2010.
- "Wifredo Lam 1902–1982: Voyages entre caraïbes et avant-gardes," Musée des Beaux-Arts de Nantes, France, May 6–August 29, 2010.
- "Césaire, Lam, Picasso, Nous nous sommes trouvés," Galerie nationales du Grand Palais, Paris, France, March 16–June 6, 2011.
- "Césaire, Lam, Picasso, Nous nous sommes trouvés," Fondation Clément, Le François (Martinique), December 6, 2013–March 2, 2014.
- "Wifredo Lam, Imagining New Worlds, McMullen Museum of Art," Boston, August 30–December 14, 2014; High Museum of Art, Atlanta, February 10–May 24, 2015.
- "Wifredo Lam, the EY Exhibition." Tate Modern Gallery, London (September 14, 2016–January 8, 2017).
- "Wifredo Lam," Musée national d'Art Moderne, Centre Georges Pompidou, Paris, September 30, 2015–February 15, 2016; Museo Nacional Centro de Arte Reina Sofia, Madrid, April 5-August 15, 2016; Tate Modern, London, September 14, 2016–January 8, 2017.
- "The Drawings of Wifredo Lam: 1940–1955. From the personal collection of Juan Castillo Vázquez, Havana, Cuba." Lehigh University Art Galleries, Zoellner Arts Center, Bethlehem PA, August 30–December 10, 2017.
- "Wifredo Lam: The Imagination at Work," Pace Gallery, New York City, November 10–December 18, 2021.
- "Wifredo Lam: When I Don"t Sleep, I Dream," Museum of Modern Art, New York City, November 10, 2025–April 11, 2026.

== See also ==
- Cuban art

== Bibliography ==
- Adams, Beverly and Christophe Cherix (eds.). Wifredo Lam: When I Don"t Sleep, I Dream (exhibition catalog). New York: The Museum of Modern Art, 2025. (ISBN 978-1-633-45178-0)
- Benitez, Helena. Wifredo and Helena: My Life with Wifredo Lam 1939–1950, Acatos, Lausanne, 1999.
- Catherine David (ed.), exhibition catalogue, Centre Georges Pompidou, Paris, Museo Nacional Centro de Arte Reina Sofia, Madrid, Tate Modern, London, Editions du Centre Pompidou, Paris, 2015
- Dias Ramos, Afonso. 2016. "The EY Exhibition: Wifredo Lam." Cuba Counterpoints, Dec 1, 2016.
- Fouchet, Max-Pol. Wifredo Lam, Poligrafa, Barcelona, 1976; Cercle d'Art, Paris, 1976; Rizzoli, New York, 1978.
- Hernández Adrián, Francisco-J. "Paris, Cuba, New York: Wifredo Lam and the Lost Origins of The Jungle", Cultural Dynamics 21.3 (2009): 339–59.
- Jouffroy, Alain. Lam, Editions Georges Fall, Paris, 1970.
- Lam, Eskil, Dolega-Ritter, Dorota, Tonneau-Ryckelynck, Dominique. Catalogue Raisonné, Prints, Estampes, Grafica, 版画, H.C Éditions, Paris, 2016.
- Lam, Wifredo, Alexandra Chang, Samantha A. Noël and Kaira Cabañas. Wifredo Lam: The Imagination at Work (exhibition catalog). New York: Pace Gallery, 2022. (ISBN 978-1-948-70151-8)
- Laurin-Lam, Lou. Catalogue Raisonné of the Painted Work, Volume I, 1923–1960, Acatos, Lausanne, 1996.
- Laurin-Lam, Lou, Lam, Eskil. Catalogue Raisonné of the Painted Work, Volume II, 1961–1982, Acatos, Lausanne, 2002.
- Leenhardt, Jacques, Lam, H.C. Éditions, Paris, 2009.
- Leiris, Michel. Wifredo Lam, Fratelli Fabri, Milan, 1970; Harry N. Abrams, New York, 1970.
- Ortiz, Fernando. Wifredo Lam y su obra vista a través de su significados criticos, Publicaciones del ministerio de Educacion, La
- Victor Moreno – ein kubanischer Maler, Vielflieger VerlagHabana, 1950.
- Sims, Lowery, S. Wifredo Lam and the International Avant-Garde, 1923–1982, Texas University Press, Austin, 2002.
- Tonneau-Ryckelynck, Dominique. Wifredo Lam, Œuvre gravé et lithographié, Catalogue Raisonné, Éditions du Musée de Gravelines, 1994.
- Pintores Cubanos, Editors Vicente Baez, Virilio Pinera, Calvert Casey, and Anton Arrufat; Ediciones Revolucion, Havana, Cuba, 1962.
