= Walmar Wladimir Schwab =

Swiss chemist (1902–2000)

Walmar Wladimir Schwab was born in Moscow on 1 September 1902 and died in Onex, Switzerland, on 19 August 2000. A painter and print-maker in Paris during the 1920s, he later abandoned this for a career in chemistry and took Swiss nationality.

== Artistic career ==
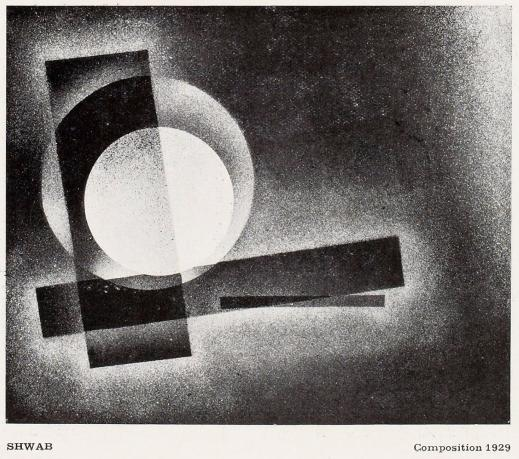
Schwab's 1929 “Composition”, reproduced in Art Concret

During his years in Paris, Schwab produced a series of pictures in the abstract geometrical style between the late 1920s and early 1930s. Between November–December 1929 he exhibited at the Galerie der Sturm in Berlin. He was also approached by Theo van Doesburg to sign the Art Concret manifesto but pleaded that he was constitutionally against joining artistic groups; however, he allowed a print of one of his works to appear in their art review in April 1930.

Long after his abandonment of art, Schwab was rediscovered in 1975, by which time geometrical abstraction had been accepted and was regarded as important. It was then that the Kunsthaus Zürich devoted an exhibition to 40 of his works, accompanied by a nine-page brochure, and thereafter paintings and posters of his began to appear in art showrooms.

== Later life ==
Schwab did not leave Paris for several more years after giving up painting and was described as a “theatre personality” at the time he began a twenty-year relationship with the Swiss Valentine de Kerven (1901–1991). Together they joined the Revolutionary Association of Artists and trained to fight against General Franco during the Spanish Civil War, until Schwab withdrew. In 1939 they crossed the Sahara on her motorbike, then settled in Switzerland during World War II. Until then Valentine had refused to marry Schwab, but Swiss law obliged cohabiters to wed at the time. In 1954 they made another difficult journey, driving overland to India via Iraq, Iran and Afghanistan in a Volkswagen, in order to visit Jiddu Krishnamurti. Not long afterwards Schwab started a sexual relationship with an 18-year-old and Valentine divorced him.

During the 1940s Schwab took a doctorate in Chemistry at the University of Geneva. His dissertation on anthraquinone pigments in lesser fungi (Recherches sur les pigments anthraquinoniques des champignons inférieurs) was published by the university in 1946. Other publications at that period appeared in Acta Tropica and included consideration of ricin production in the Sahara and vanilla growing in the Comoro Islands, both of which he had visited.
