= Pedro de Oraá =

Cuban artist (1931–2020)

Pedro de Oraá (1931 – 25 August 2020) was a Cuban contemporary visual artist, best known for his contributions to the Cuban abstract movement of Concretism in the 1950s and his involvement in the group Los Once (the eleven) in 1956 and the co-founding of Los Diez Pintores Concretos (The 10 Concrete Painters) known simply as, Los Diez with fellow artists Loló Soldevilla and Sandú Daríe, in 1957. He was a painter, art critic, poet, designer, translator, and the beneficiary of many awards such as the Distinction for National Culture in 1995, the National Book Design Prize in 2011 and the National Prize for Plastic Arts in 2015.

== Biography ==
Pedro de Oraá was born in Havana, Cuba in 1931 and studied at the Academy of Fine Arts San Alejandro. After he met his wife Loló Soldevilla, they traveled to Venezuela for his first solo exhibition at Galería-Librería Sardio, Caracas (1957). That same year, the couple founded Galería de Arte Color-Luz in Havana home of the artists' group they co-founded, Los Diez Pintores Concretos, a group of artists working in geometric abstraction in Cuba from 1958 to 1961. Los Diez were the pioneers for the Concrete movement or Concrete Abstraction, a style that defines itself as simply geometrical and without "...representational or drawn-from-life references... a style without narrative or natural connections..." Even after the groups' dissolution in 1961, Oraá represented Cuba in many exhibitions both on the island and abroad and was a significant member in many cultural organizations such as The National Union of Writers and Artists and The National Council of Culture. With a career spanning more than 70 years, De Oraá was the last living member of Los Diez.

De Oraá's work was included with that of other members of Los Diez at the David Zwirner Gallery exhibition "Concrete Cuba" displayed at the gallery's London location in 2015 and their New York City venue in 2016. The catalogue for the exhibition features an interview De Oraá by Lucas Zwirner.

== History ==
"In Cuba, the entrance of abstraction implied-for the very first time-the synchronization with international isms and a revolution itself within the Cuban art history." The development of this obscure branch of modernism went hand in hand with the political transitions of the times and the tumultuous years that led up to Fidel Castro's rise to power. This process of transition shaped the groups' philosophy and focused their concern on "...deepening the art experience, an affirming response with respect to national identity and art..." However, the public and acclaimed art critics saw the work as ridiculous and foreign due to its assimilation of art movements from Latin America, Europe and its disregard for classic, academically taught, realistic techniques from the Vanguardists tradition. Although Los Diez exhibited as a group only three times, they comprised a significant period in Cuban political, social and artistic history in only three years. From the fall of Fulgencio Batista's regime to the Cuban Revolution and the rise of a very nationalistic sentiment, "Concretism" was all but omitted from Cuban art history until today with e Oraá's win of a National Prize for Visual Arts. "It seems to me that Pedro de Oraá (1931) has always been there, reminding us through his work that a great piece is one that remains firmly on its path, indifferent to the ever-changing winds of fashion that blow." Today, "Concretism" is being acknowledged as an important period of art history after decades of being forgotten.

== Exhibitions ==
2018

- 3Concrete, Kendall Art Center, Miami, FL (group)
- Across Time: Cuban Abstraction, Pedro Ávila, Pedro de Oraá and Jose Villa, Kendall Art Center, Miami, FL (group)
- Divertimentos II, Latin Art Core, Miami, FL (solo)

2017

- Divertimentos, Collage Habana Gallery, Havana, Cuba (solo)

2016

- Concrete Cuba, David Zwirner's 20th Street Gallery, New York, NY (group)

2015

- Concrete Cuba, David Zwirner's Gallery, London, England (group)
- The Silent Shout: Voices in Cuban Abstraction 1950-2013, ArtSpace/Virginia Miller Gallery, Coral Gables, FL (group)

1984

- VII International Biennial of Art, Kosice, Slovakia

1970-1980

- Part of the Premi International Dibuix Joan Miró in Barcelona, Spain

1960

- Biennial Inter Americana, Mexico
- VII Salon d·Ete d·Arts Plastiques Internacional 90, Tunisia

1959

- V Sao Paulo Biennial, Sao Paulo, Brazil

1957

- Galeria Color-Luz, Havana, Cuba (group)
- Sardio Gallery, Caracas, Venezuela (solo)
