= René Portocarrero =

Cuban artist (1912–1985)

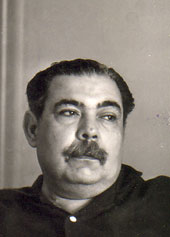
- Born: February 24, 1912; Havana, Cuba
- Died: April 7, 1985 (aged 73); Havana, Cuba
- Occupation: Artist

René Portocarrero (born Havana, 24 February 1912; died Havana, 7 April 1985) was a Cuban artist recognised internationally for his achievements.

== History ==
Portocarrero began his artistic education at the San Alejandro academy, but left early and is hence considered 'self taught'. He put on his first exhibition in 1934, at the Havana Lyceum, beginning a long and fruitful career which included a 1937 collaboration with Mariano Rodríguez and work as a 'free studies' teacher of painting and sculpture. After travels in Haiti, Europe and the United States he gave his first show to an overseas audience at Julien Levy's gallery in New York City in 1945.

In 1950, he worked with Wifredo Lam, Mariano, Martinez Pedro and Amelia Peláez in the village of Santiago de las Vegas. In 1961, he had meetings with Fidel Castro in the José Martí National Library, where they discussed culture. René received lessons in painting from Nicolás Guillén Landrián. In 1977 he worked for the Japan Women's Association. In 1979, he worked for UNESCO and AIAP. He knew Peggy Guggenheim.

In the 1980s, he taught Victor Miquel Moreno Piñeiro (Victor Moreno), cousin of Servando Cabrera Moreno.

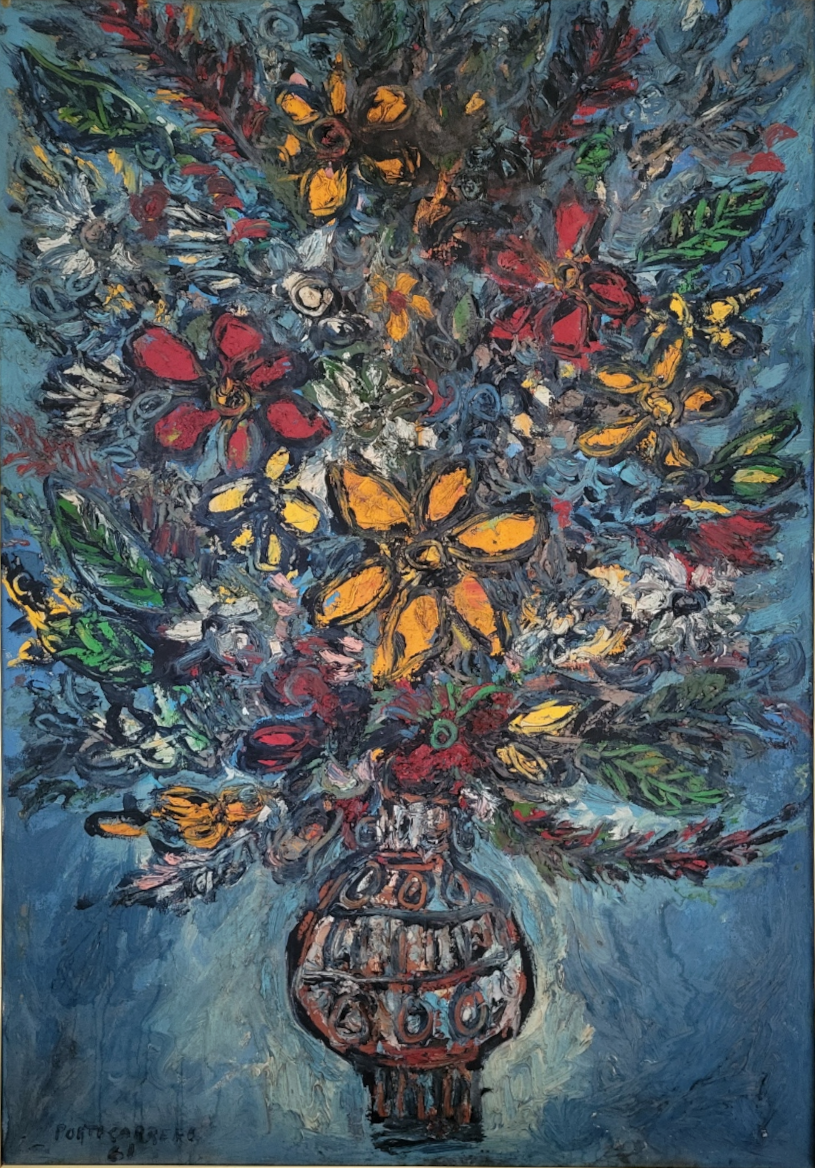
Bucaro (flower vase) by Rene Portocarrero. Signed and dated (1961) in lower left corner. Private collection.

== Artworks ==
As well as a painter and sculptor, Portocarrero worked as a ceramicist, scenic designer and book illustrator, publishing his own Las Máscaras (The Masks) in 1935 and El Sueño (The Dream) in 1939. He was also a muralist, producing public artworks for the Havana Prison, a church in Bauta, Cuba, the Cuban National Hospital, the Cuban National Theatre and the Habana Hilton. His artworks form part of the permanent collections of galleries in Argentina (Bellas Artes, Buenos Aires), Brazil (Museums of Modern Art, São Paulo and Rio de Janeiro), Canada (National Gallery, Ottawa), France (Modern Arts, Paris), Peru (Instituto de Arte Contemporaneo, Lima), the United States (Museums of Modern Art, New York and San Francisco; Milwaukee Art Center; Union Panamericana, Washington; Museum of Fine Arts, Houston; Art Museum, Indianapolis), Uruguay (Bellas Artes, Montevideo) and Venezuela (Bellas Artes, Caracas), as well as his native Cuba (Museo Nacional, Havana).

== Awards ==
In his lifetime he won 'best collection' at the seventh São Paulo Art Biennial (1963), was honoured by the governments of Bulgaria and Poland, and given a seat on UNESCO's International Association of Fine Art. Five of his paintings can be viewed online at www.vanguardiacubana.com. In 1981 he received the 'Felix Varela' prize from Cuba and in 1982 he received the 'Aztec Eagle', Mexico's highest award.
