= Léon Arthur Tutundjian =

Armenian painter

Léon Arthur Tutundjian

Léon Arthur Tutundjian (Armenian: Լեւոն Թիւթիւնճեան; 1905, Amasya, Ottoman Empire – December 1968, Paris, France) was an Armenian painter who achieved fame in France.

== Life ==
Tutundjian was primarily a surrealist.
