= Huib Hoste =

Belgian architect, designer and urban planner

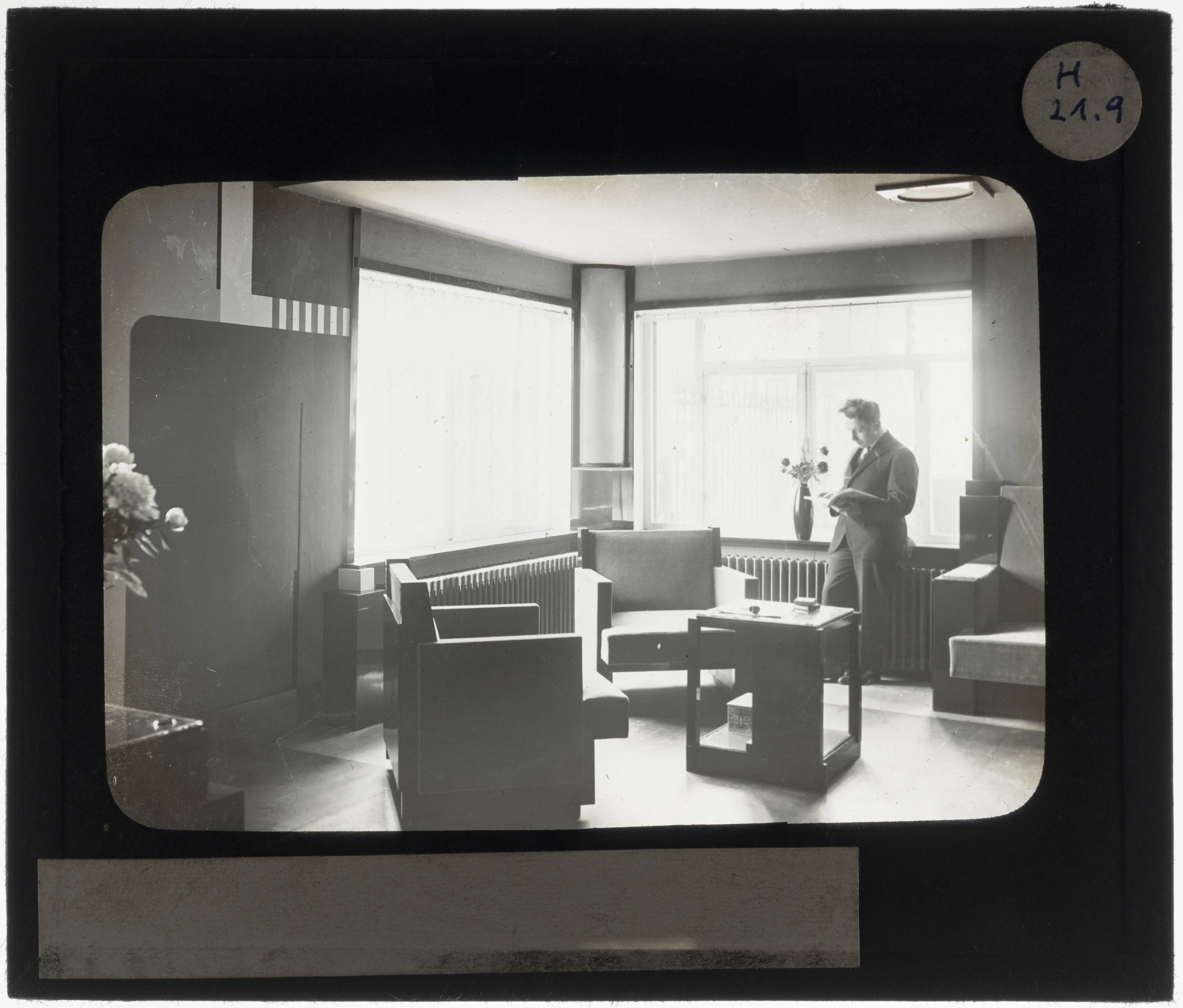
Huib Hoste 1925 photography ProvidedCHO KU Leuven

Hubrecht (Huib) Hoste (6 February 1881 – 18 August 1957) was a Belgian architect, designer and urban planner. He is considered the pioneer of modern architecture in Belgium.

== Life ==
Huib Hoste was born in Bruges on 6 February 1881. His birth was registered in French by his father Leon with the name of Hubert Léon Bruno Jean Marie Hoste. Hoste grew up in a French-speaking traditionalist Catholic family from Bruges. He graduated from Ghent University. After his studies, he worked in the office of his teacher Charles De Wulf (1862–1904) but took lessons in Ghent as a free apprentice of architect-engineer Louis Cloquet (1849–1920), who also employed him for a while.

== Works ==
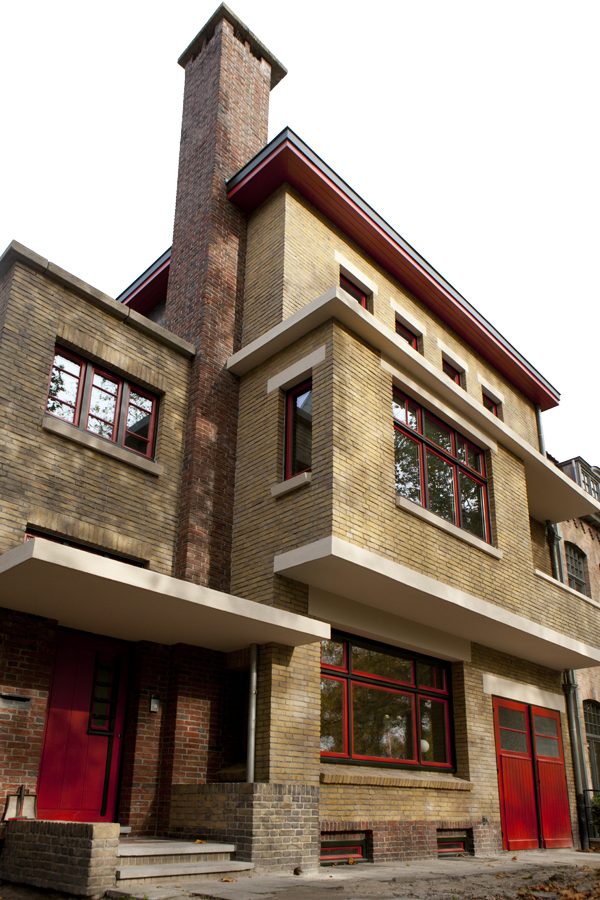
Billiet House (Bruges)

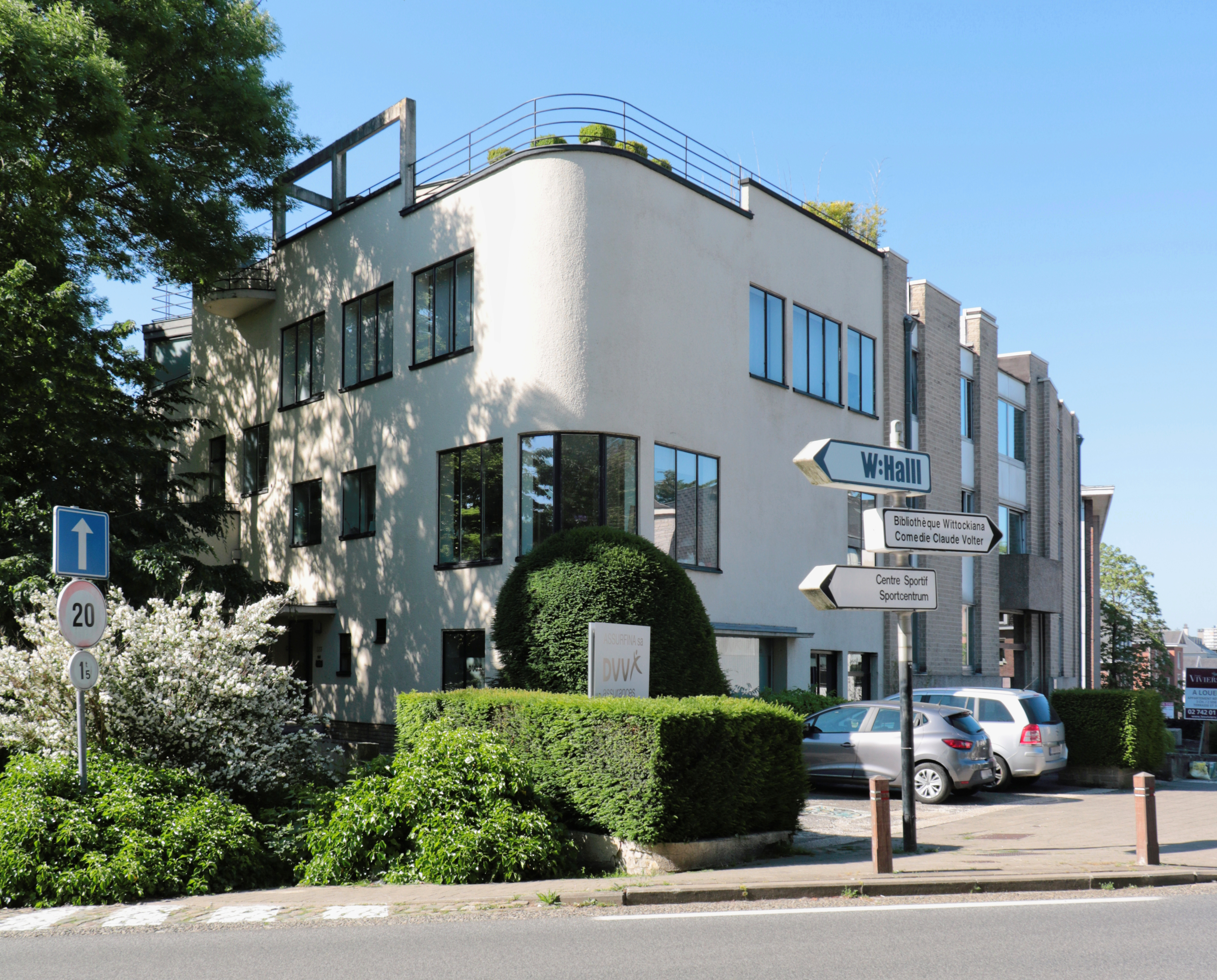
Gombert House (Brussels, 1933).

Until the First World War, Hoste lived in Bruges. To earn his living, Hoste was obliged to build in the Gothic Revival style. In total, he realized about thirty projects. From 1911 onwards he underwent the influence of Dutch architecture, especially that of Hendrik Petrus Berlage. He travelled regularly to the Netherlands to analyze and study the works of this visionary Dutch architect. He designed houses in Sint-Michiels, a suburb of Bruges, and in Assebroek that clearly show Berlage's influence. The first house he built was his own in Sint-Michiels, the traditional villa Lindenhof, popularly known as "De Grote Valies" (The Great suitcase). Just next to it he designed a villa with a workshop for his friend, the painter Joe English.

During the First World War, he went into exile with his family in the neutral Netherlands. He deepened his knowledge of Dutch modernist architecture and, in particular, De Stijl movement and the Amsterdam School. He met the architects Robert van 't Hoff, Jan Wils, Jacobus Oud, and Michel De Klerk. Hoste also met Theo van Doesburg and Piet Mondrian. Through his contact with these modernist artists, Hoste turned to modernism himself.

During his stay in the Netherlands, Hoste in 1916 designed the Belgian monument of Amersfoort, in the vicinity of the former refugee camp "Elisabeth-dorp", to commemorate the war period and the hardships of the Belgian refugees.

In 1918, the magazine De Stijl published an article by Hoste entitled "De roeping der moderne architectuur" (The vocation of modern architecture), in which he made a case for the use of contemporary materials such as iron and reinforced concrete. This would be his only contribution to De Stijl. A month later, in an article in the Nieuwe Amsterdammer, he praised the watercolors of Henriette Willebeek le Mair, a Dutch watercolorist for children. Van Doesburg publicly distanced himself from Hoste in an article in De Stijl entitled "Open brief aan den Architect Huib Hoste" ("open letter to the architect Huib Hoste"). Hoste would, however, continue to be interested in their ideas and works.

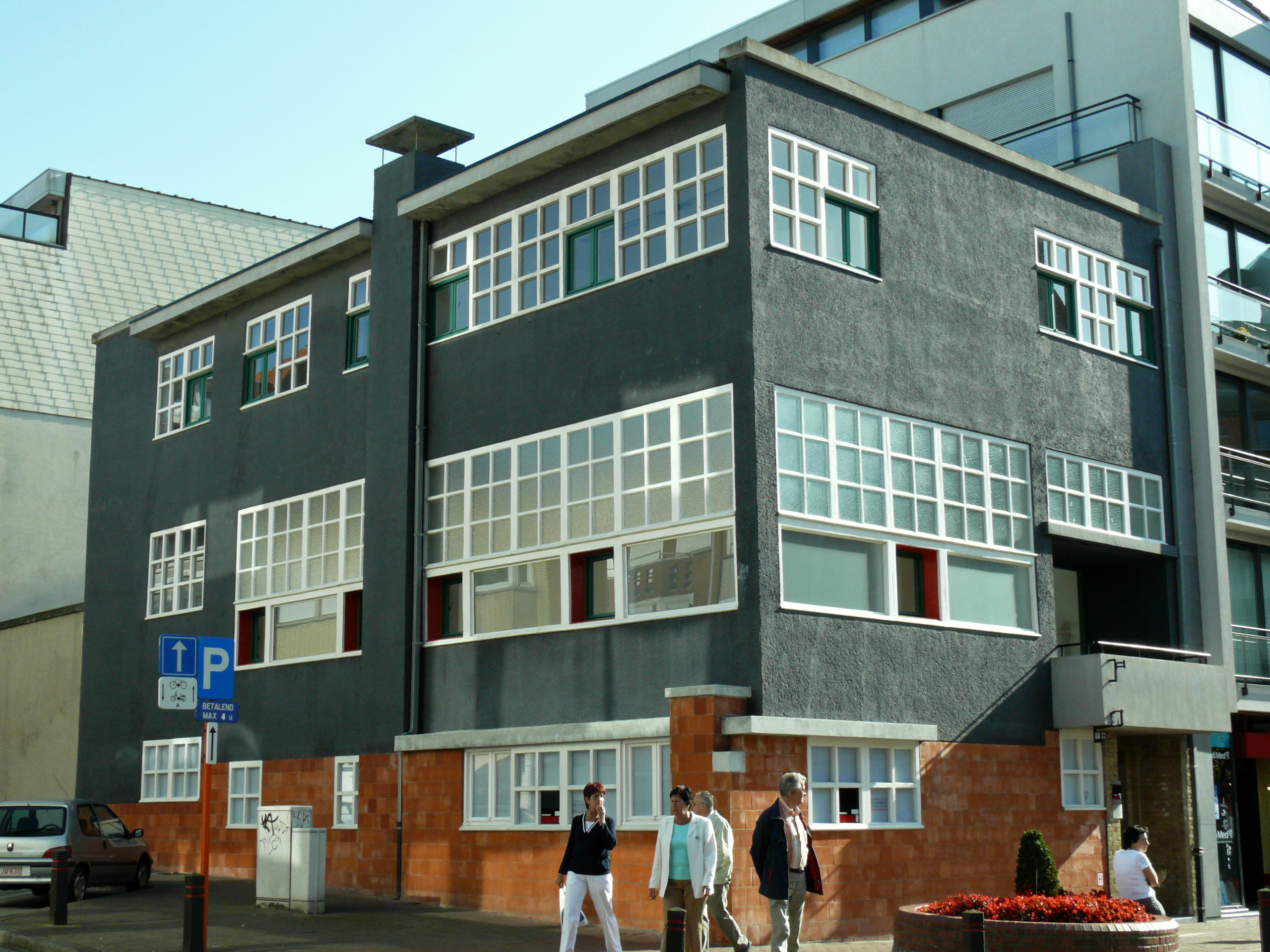
The House De Beir, known as Het Zwarte Huis (Black House), designed by Hoste in Knokke in collaboration with Victor Servranckx

After the war, he returned to Belgium and devoted himself to modernism. He cooperated intensively in the reconstruction of Belgium. The middle of the 1920s was the highlight of Hoste's career. His major works are the Church of Our Lady in Zonnebeke (1922), in collaboration with Jules Fonteyne, the garden city 'Kapelleveld' in Woluwe-Saint-Lambert (1923), the residential district 'Little Russia' in Zelzate (1921–1923), the Nordzee Hotel (1922–1924), the De Beir House (1924) in Knokke, the Billiet House in Bruges (1927), and Gombert House in Brussels (1933–1934). The De Beir house was his first truly modernist building. Hoste also carried out several projects in the town of Wervik, including several houses and commercial buildings. He became interested in the rationalization and standardization of construction and the use of concrete to avoid the use of brick, and explored the use of fly ash as a replacement for Portland cement in concrete.

Hoste enjoyed international recognition. His 'bureau-fumoir' (office – smoking room), a collaboration with Victor Servranckx and Het Binnenhuis, was awarded a gold medal during the Paris International Exhibition of Modern Decorative and Industrial Arts in 1925.

In the mid-twenties Hoste's professional prospects were promising, but in 1926 the collapse of a school under construction in Bruges due to a weak concrete foundation, killing five people, ruined him. Not only did Hoste lose his professorship of architecture at La Cambre, the visual arts school founded by Henry van de Velde in Brussels in 1926, but he had to leave Bruges for Antwerp.

In 1928, Hoste joined the Congrès Internationaux d'Architecture Moderne (CIAM), an organization promoting functional architecture and urban design, with the objective of spreading the principles of the Modern Movement. In 1929, he joined the Cercle et Carré (Circle and Square), a group of abstract artists in Paris, founded by Joaquín Torres García and Michel Seuphor.

As editor-in-chief of Opbouwen, he took part in the lively discussion for the development of Linkeroever, an area in the city of Antwerp on the left bank of the Scheldt, and worked on the plans for this in 1933 with Le Corbusier in collaboration with Renaat Braem.

After the Second World War, he continued to publish articles and books on architecture. From 1953 to 1956, together with the art critic K.N. Elno, he published the magazine Ruimte, dedicated to architecture, urban planning and design.

Garden city Kapelleveld (1923–1926).

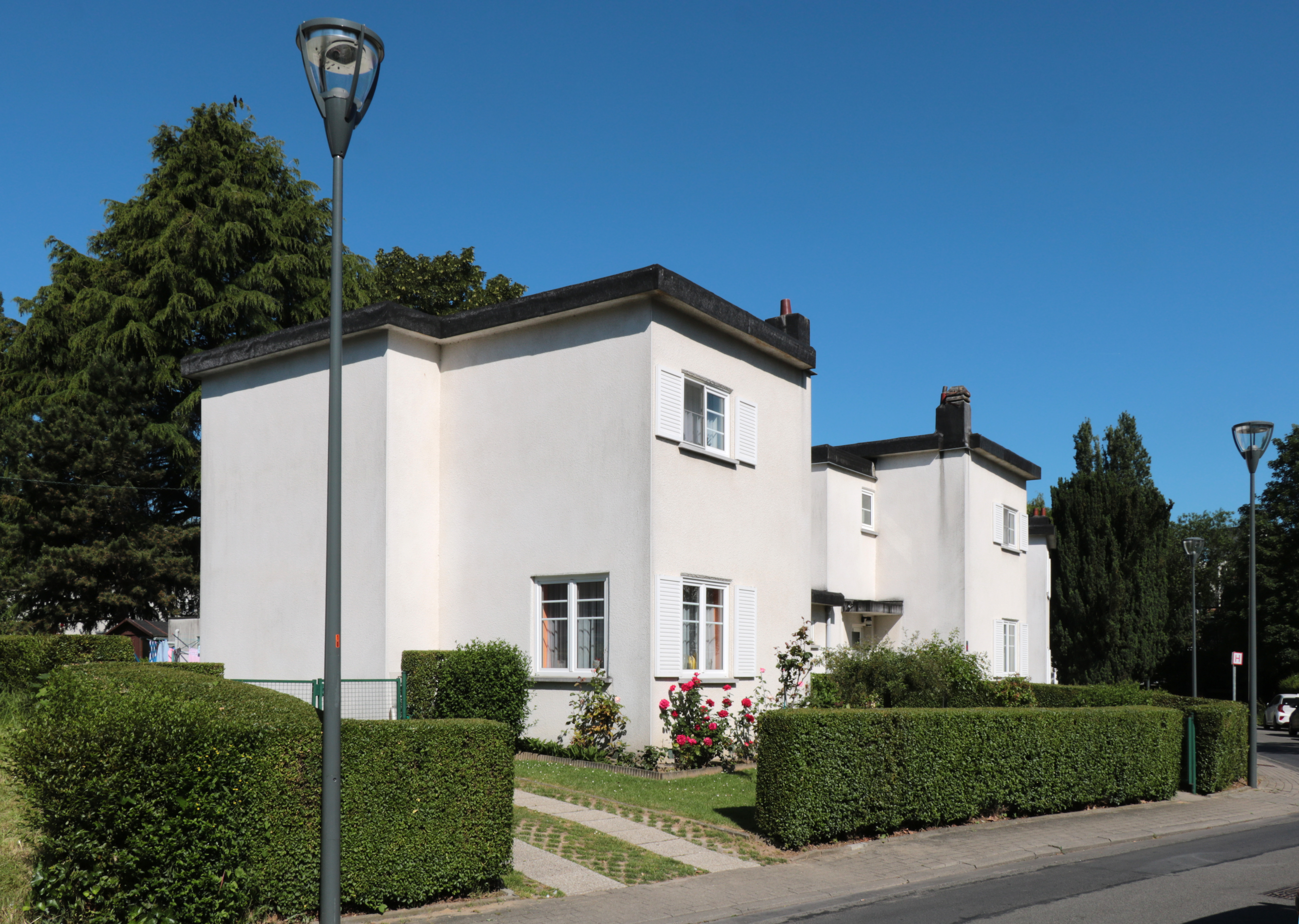

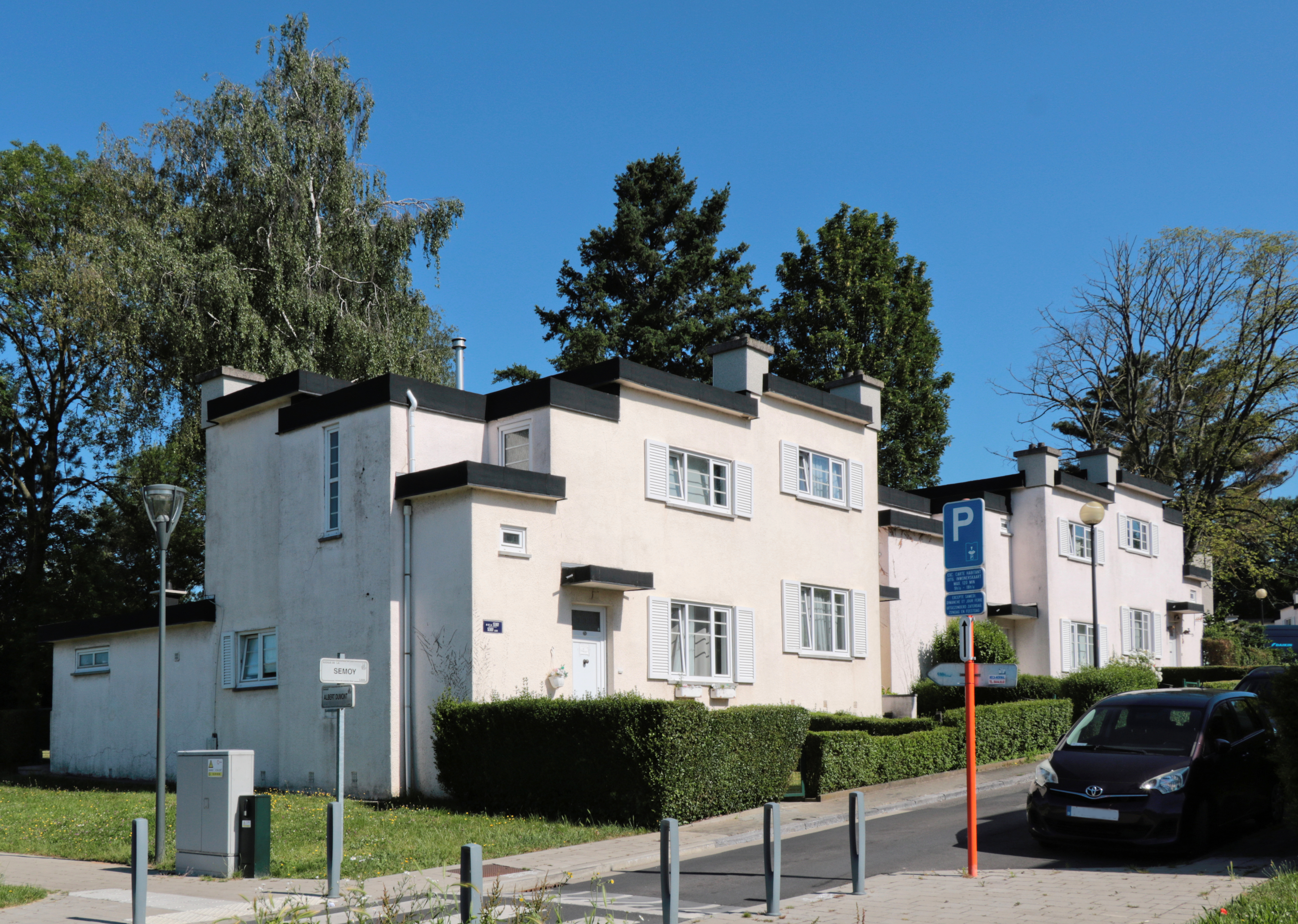

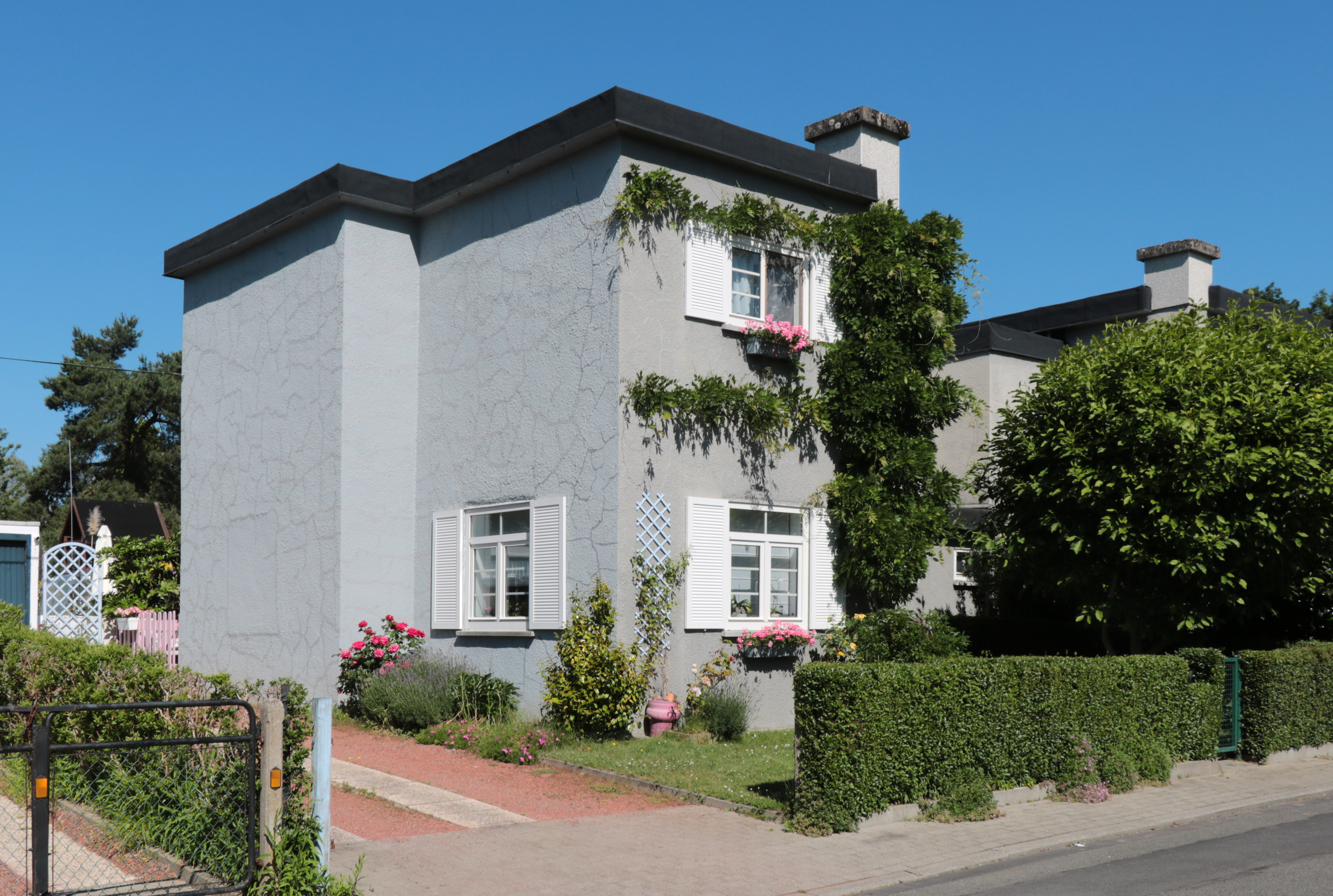

== Publications ==
- Hoste, Huib (17 November 1917). "De Stijl". De Telegraaf (in Dutch): 7.
- Hoste, Huib (June 1918). "De roeping der moderne architectuur" [The vocation of modern architecture]. De Stijl (in Dutch). 1e jaargang (8): 85–87.
- Hoste, Huib (20 July 1918). "Het nieuw gemaalgebouw te Rotterdam" (PDF). Bouwkundig Weekblad (in Dutch). 39e jaargang (29): 169–170.
- Van Doesburg, Theo (July 1918). "Open brief aan den Architect Huib Hoste" [open letter to the architect Huib Hoste]. De Stijl (in Dutch). 1e jaargang (9): 135–136.
- Hoste, Huib (1 March 1919). "Het vacantiehuis te Noordwijkerhout". De Telegraaf (in Dutch): 7.
- Hoste, Huib (6 May 1919). "Jan Wils". De Telegraaf (in Dutch): 7.
- Hoste, Huib (1930). Van Bouwen en Wonen (in Dutch). Brugge: Excelsior.
- Hoste, Huib (March 1931). "In memoriam Theo van Doesburg". Opbouwen (in Dutch). 2 (6): 164. ISSN 0774-8345.
