= Willi Baumeister =

German painter

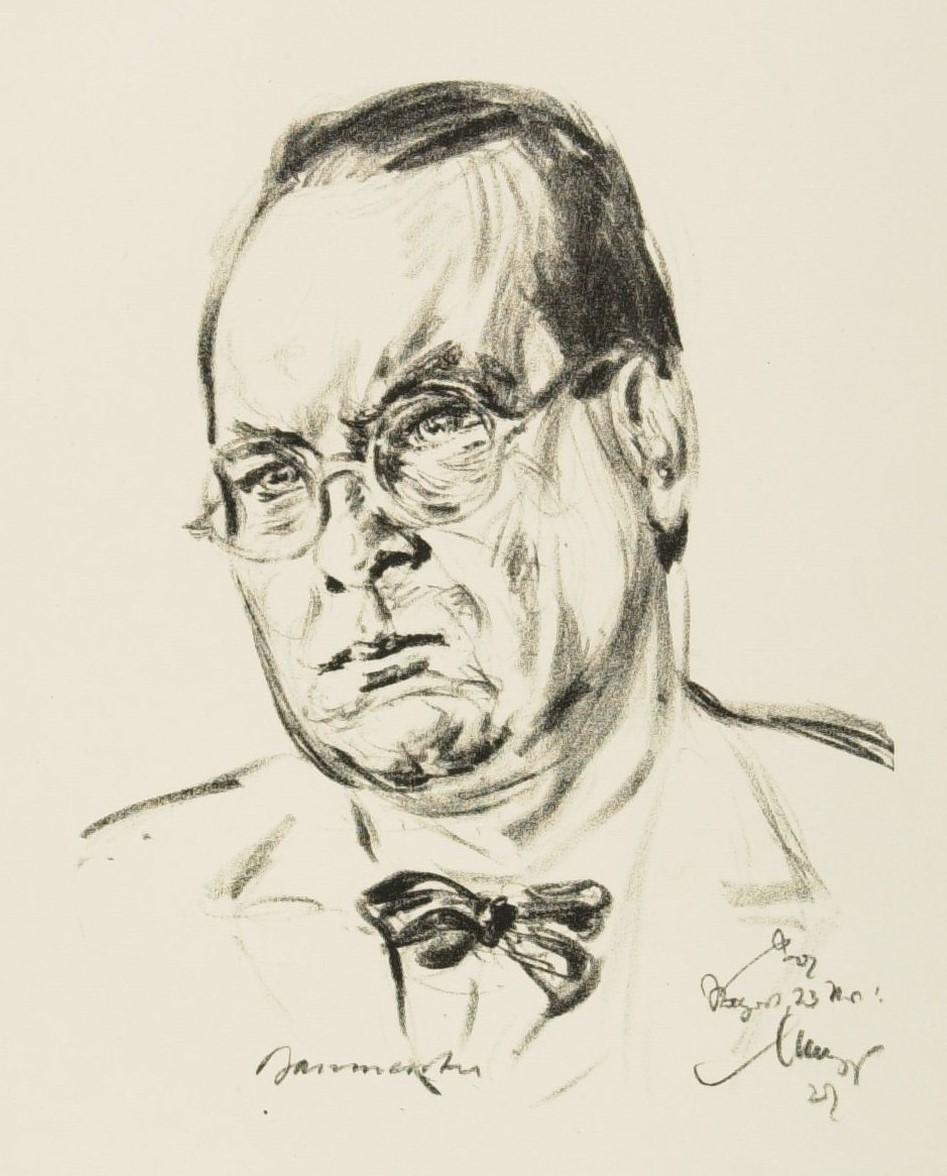
Illustration of Baumeister by Emil Stumpp

Willi Baumeister (22 January 1889 – 31 August 1955) was a German painter, scenic designer, art professor, and typographer. In the early part of his career he developed a style of abstract painting that emphasized geometry, flat planes, and hard edges. The pictorial language of his later work is characterized by organic forms and symbols influenced by his appreciation of prehistoric art.

== Life ==
In Stuttgart on January 22, 1889 Friedrich Wilhelm (called Willi) Baumeister became the family’s third child, born after Klara and Hans. Their father Wilhelm Baumeister (1847–1931) was court master chimney-sweep. He had studied mechanical engineering at the Stuttgart Polytechnic, but early on had to take over his father’s business, then in the third generation. Willi’s mother Anna, née Schuler (1861–1945), was the daughter of the decorative painter Friedrich Wilhelm Schuler. Anna was very gifted in arts. From her family Willi received his first artistic impulses – paired with a good deal of diligence and handicraft skill. Already as a child his most prized toys were paper and pencil. Around age 16 he decided to study at the art academy but at his father’s request first trained as a decorative painter from 1905 to 1907, a training that, due to his advanced work, he completed early with the journeyman exam.

Baumeister completed an apprenticeship as a decorative painter in his native city from 1905 to 1907, followed by military service fall 1907–1908. During his apprenticeship, Baumeister also began art studies at the Stuttgart Art Academy (Königlich Württembergische Akademie) from 1905 to 1906, attended Robert Poetzelberger’s drawing class, and took additional lessons from Josef Kerschensteiner. In 1906 he resumed his apprenticeship and, in 1907, completed the trade test.

Following his military service, Baumeister continued his studies at the art academy. Dismissed by his teacher Poetzelberger for his perceived lack of talent, he switched into the composition class of Adolf Hölzel, with whom he studied until 1912, where he met his lifelong friend, Oskar Schlemmer.

Baumeister took his first trip to Paris in 1911, successfully participated in a gallery exhibition in Zurich in 1912 and a year later participated in the Erster Deutscher Herbstsalon (First German Autumn Salon) in the Berlin gallery Der Sturm. There he met the expressionist painter Franz Marc. In 1914 Baumeister had his first solo exhibition at Der Neue Kunstsalon (New Art Salon) in Stuttgart. In the same year, Adolf Hölzel arranged a commission for wall paintings at the Deutsche Werkbund-Ausstellung (German Werkbund Exhibition) in Cologne for Baumeister, Schlemmer, and Herman Stenner. Prior to being drafted into the army in the summer of 1914 (until 1918), Baumeister travelled to Amsterdam, London, and Paris. During the World War I, Baumeister met the painter Oskar Kokoschka and the architect Adolf Loos in Vienna in 1915. In 1916 he participated in the exhibition Hölzel und sein Kreis (Hölzel and his Circle) at the Art Association in Freiburg im Breisgau, which was subsequently shown at the Ludwig Schames Art Salon in Frankfurt am Main. In 1918, still prior to being discharged from military service, he threw an exhibition with his friend Oskar Schlemmer at the Galerie Schaller in Stuttgart. Baumeister and Schlemmer campaigned to bring Paul Klee to the Stuttgart Academy, which was rejected by the Academy. Klee, for his part, would have been willing to come. In 1919 Baumeister became a member of the Berlin artist association Novembergruppe (November Group). The group was founded by Max Pechstein in 1918, immediately following Germany’s capitulation and the fall of the monarchy. It remained one of the most important alliances of German artists until 1933.

In Stuttgart in 1919, Baumeister took up the initiative with Schlemmer and other artists to found the artist group Üecht (Alemannic: genuine, true), which he left in 1921. In 1919 he produced his first stage design, which was followed by seventeen others. In 1920 Baumeister completed his art studies, worked as an independent artist, and participated in exhibitions in Berlin, Dresden, and Hagen. His popularity and recognition abroad became evident in a joint exhibition with Fernand Léger in the Berlin gallery Der Sturm in 1922. During these years, Baumeister developed professional relationships with artists such as Paul Klee, Léger, Le Corbusier, Amédée Ozenfant, and Michel Seuphor. In 1924 several of his works were shown at the Erste Allgemeine Deutsche Kunstausstellung (First General German Art Exhibition) in Moscow and, in 1925, he participated in the Paris exhibition L’Art d’aujourd’hui (Art Today). Alongside his artistic work, he was also active in the area of commercial art and designed advertisements for numerous companies, such as Bosch and DLW (Deutsche Linoleumwerke).

In 1926 Baumeister married the painter Margarete Oehm (1898–1978) and was offered the opportunity to take part in the International Exhibition of Modern Art in New York, followed by a solo exhibition in Paris the following year, where he also participated in the Große Berliner Kunstausstellung (Great Berlin Art Exhibition) with his own room, where he met Kasimir Malevich.

In 1927 Baumeister accepted a teaching post at the Frankfurt School of Applied Arts, later Städelschule. There he taught from 1928 a class in commercial art, typography, and textile printing. In 1928, his daughter was born. The following year he turned down a position at the Bauhaus in Dessau. His work was part of the art competitions at the 1928 Summer Olympics and the 1932 Summer Olympics. A member of the ring neue werbegestalter (Circle of New Commercial Designers) (chairman: Kurt Schwitters) since 1927, Baumeister joined the artist association Cercle et Carré (Circle and Square) in 1930. In the same year, he received the Württemberg State Prize for the painting Line Figure. After "Cercle et Carré", he also became a member of the artist association "Abstraction-Création" in Paris.

On 31 March 1933, following the National Socialist rise to power, Baumeister was dismissed from his professorship at the Städel. His colleague Professor Albert Windisch and Wilhelm Biering continued his lessons. Thereafter Baumeister earned his living mainly from commercial art, he was still however able to travel to Switzerland, Italy, and France. In the same year, his daughter Felicitas was born. In 1936 he was introduced by the Wuppertaler architect Heinz Rasch, with whom he work during the 1924 Exhibition in Stuttgart, to Dr. Kurt Herberts, the owner of a varnish factory in Wuppertal. He began working for the company in 1937, joining other artists ostracized by the National Socialist regime: Franz Krause, Alfred Lörcher, Georg Muche, and Oskar Schlemmer, and the art historian Hans Hildebrandt. That year four of his works were shown in the National Socialist exhibition Entartete Kunst (Degenerate art) in Munich.

Until 1941, when a ban on his paintings and exhibitions was issued by the Reich Chamber of Culture (Reichskulturkammer), Baumeister still had many opportunities to exhibit his works abroad in Europe. Despite the prohibition and the constant surveillance, he still worked at the Herberts varnish factory, as well as on his art. In 1943, when a bomb attack rendered Wuppertal as well as Baumeister’s house in Stuttgart uninhabitable, he moved with his family to Urach in the Swabian Alps.

In 1945, after the end of the Second World War, Baumeister completed his book Das Unbekannte in der Kunst (The Unknown in Art), which was only published in 1947, even though he had completed the manuscript in 1943–44. In 1946 he received the position to teach a class in decorative paintings at the Stuttgart Academy of Arts and in 1947 resumed his exhibition activities. In 1949 he became the co-founder of the artist group Gegenstandlose (The Group of Nonrepresentational Artists), which threw its first exhibition called ZEN 49 in 1950. Here Baumeister met Fritz Winter, Ernst Wilhelm Nay, Paul Fontaine, and many others who worked in the field of fine arts after the end of the war and the dictatorship in Germany to forge a new beginning and connection to international developments. In his participation in the Erstes Darmstädter Gespräch (First Darmstadt Dialogue) in July 1950, at the exhibition Das Menschenbild in unserer Zeit (The Human Image of Our Time), Baumeister defended modern art against Hans Sedlmayr's thesis of a "loss of the center" ("Verlust der Mitte").

Until his death in 1955, Baumeister stood at the peak of his artistic career, which was demonstrated by his participation in many national and international exhibitions such as the Venice Biennale in 1948, the São Paulo Biennale (Brazil) in 1951, where he received a prize for his painting Cosmic Gesture, and Younger European Artists at the Guggenheim Museum in New York in 1953. In 1955 Willi Baumeister retired (emeritus) from the Stuttgart Art Academy, although he still received a teaching contract for the following semester. On 31 August 1955, he died sitting with his brush in his hand in his atelier in Stuttgart.

== Work ==
Baumeister took part in his first exhibition in 1910, showing figurative works inspired by impressionism. His chief interest was even at this time already in cubism and Paul Cézanne, whose work remained important to him throughout his life. These influences of impressionism and cubism that shaped Baumeister’s early paintings played an essential role in his work until the end of the 1920s. On the one hand, his representational painting was increasingly reduced (abstracting and geometric) as it gained form and lost depth. Parallel to the paintings of his friend Oskar Schlemmer, Baumeister’s independent exploration of form and color emerged. Already around 1919, his teacher Adolf Hölzel wrote to him: "Out of all of us, you will be the one who will achieve the most." Also worth noticing is that the idiosyncratic German path into modernism, expressionism, barely resonates at all in Baumeister’s work, even though he had met, for instance, Franz Marc earlier on, and was certainly acquainted with the works of the Die Brücke (The Bridge) artists and those of the Der Blaue Reiter (The Blue Rider).

After his return from the First World War, Baumeister rigorously developed his work further. Although one still finds figurative elements in his paintings, the forms grew increasingly geometric and took on a dynamic of their own, and Baumeister broke the traditional connection between form and color. Various work groups emerged at this time, including the relief-like wall pictures, and paintings with sports theme (as a symbol for modernity). In his painting, the grappling with shapes and material of the painting as well as the relationship between reality and representation became visible. Parallel to this development, nonrepresentational painting began to gain a foothold in works that centered on geometric shapes and their relationships to one another in the picture (e.g. Planar Relation of 1920). Baumeister’s lively exchange with other German and foreign artists must also be seen as vitally important in the consequent development of his work. Indeed, as it was for many of his fellow artists, posing such questions was part of the agenda of the modern age (for example, El Lissitzky, Kazimir Malevich, Wassily Kandinsky, Fernand Léger, Amédée Ozenfant, Le Corbusier, Paul Klee).

Towards the end of the 1920s, the shapes in Baumeister’s pictures grew softer. His paintings moved away from being oriented by the elementary shapes of the circle, triangle, and square towards organic forms. Although this development could also be observed concurrently in the work of other artists of his time, in Baumeister’s case, it was tied to his fascination for the prehistoric and archaic paintings. Baumeister intensely explored artifacts of early paintings and integrated this pictorial experience into his own painting. He identified the symbols, signs, and figures of cave painting as components of a valid archaic pictorial language that he used in his works. These included his increasing number of paintings in "oil on sand on canvas" that, in their materials, also approached the cave painting that Baumeister so admired (beg. ca. 1933). He himself collected examples of prehistoric findings, small sculptures, and tools, and occupied himself with cliff drawings that had been discovered in Rhodesia. This experience was undoubtedly important for Baumeister’s artistic disposition since he, evidently inspired by this rich store of prehistoric works, ultimately used extraordinarily reduced organic shapes for his "ideograms" (beg. ca. 1937). In these works he used a unique world of signs, which he saw as symbols for the laws of nature, their evolution, and human existence.

Baumeister’s artistic development was not interrupted when he lost his professorship at the Städel in Frankfurt in 1933. He continued to paint despite political persecution and economic difficulties. His work and its development are correspondingly diverse, even for the period after 1941, when he banned from exhibiting. He was the employed by the Dr. Kurt Herberts & Co. varnish factory in Wuppertal to research antique and modern painting techniques. This protected him politically and also gave him the opportunity to explore the fundamentals of painting. In this way he furthered his knowledge on prehistoric cave painting techniques. At the same time, he looked into Goethe’s theory of plant morphology. Out of this study this "eidos pictures" (eidos: idea) emerged: paintings that, unlike Baumeister’s ideograms, are rich in their variety and coloration. Moreover, these forms are organic, but seem rather than being symbols or signs, are images of simple plantlike and animal life forms. The pictures bear titles such as Rock Garden, Eidos, or Primordial Vegetable.

As an indefatigable researcher and collector, Baumeister also owned examples of African sculpture, in which he, as in the case of the prehistorical artifacts, saw universal images for life, development, and human existence. Correspondingly, their formal language entered Baumeister’s work in the early 1940s —highly abstracted, at first chromatically restrained (African Tale, 1942), and with time, became increasingly colorful and in part very complex in their formal design (Owambo 1944–1948). Both the titles and formal language reveal Baumeister’s preoccupation with other old Latin American cultures (Peruvian Wall, 1946, and Aztec Couple, 1948).

Another example of his search for the “foundations of art” is Baumeister’s transposition of the Gilgamesh Epic, one of the oldest surviving literary works. Therefore, Baumeister used his personal pictorial and sign language in his illustration of the narrative (beg. 1943), which resulted in an astonishingly unified cycle, which with his pictorial language came strikingly close to depicting the literary and linguistic effects (impression) of the epic. He also produced illustrations to texts from the Bible — Saul, Esther, Salome— as well as to William Shakespeare’s The Tempest.

In this way, Baumeister single-mindedly and successfully developed a very personal and impressive visual language that was and still is unique in the German art immediately after 1945. The national and international recognition that Willi Baumeister received in the postwar period was correspondingly high. But his artistic development did not stop there. On the one hand, he developed his painting further in a virtuosic manner and, what is more, combined the variety of his formation phases in many other pictures—in part into "overalls structures" that nonetheless still possessed a fundamental that was reminiscent of landscape imageries (Blue Movement, 1950). On the other hand, Baumeister also produced densely packed abstractions that, proceeding from a central form, characterized him as an outstanding "nonrepresentationalist." These paintings became quite possibly the most famous of his works, and were immediately associated by a broad public with Baumeister (e.g. ARU 2, 1955). Even so, Baumeister did not limit himself to this late "trademark." Multiform and multicoloured pictures emerged as well in the year of his death.

== Critical reception ==
Today, Baumeister’s work still attracts a lot of attention, particularly in Germany, France, Italy, and Spain. In contrast to the "French classics" of Modernism, or the important American artists of the second half of the twentieth century, Baumeister receives only a scant amount of attention in the Anglo-Saxon world. The quality of his work is undisputed.

It is clear that while working in "domestic emigration" during the Nazi dictatorship, he had no influence on the vital artistic environment. After 1945 Baumeister played an important role in the development of German and European art. Among the German painters who remained in the country despite the persecution by the National Socialists from 1933 to 1945, only a few succeeded in achieving such pioneering strides toward new contents and forms. Following World War II, he became a spokesman in the debate on Modernism. Regarded as an advocate of "abstract" painting, he was highly regarded by some, while strongly condemned by others.

On the occasion of Willi Baumeister's 100th birthday in 1989, Wolfgang Kermer recalled Baumeister's work as a typographer and advertising designer for the first time with an exhibition and a Catalogue raisonné – an ″exciting documentation″ for the Design Magazine form.

An important collection of Baumeister’s works is preserved in the Willi Baumeister Archive, which is part of the Kunstmuseum Stuttgart, and in the Sammlung Domnick (Domnick Collection) in Nürtingen.

== Exhibitions (selected) ==
- 1910 Württembergischer Kunstverein (as guest of an exhibition of French painters), Stuttgart, Germany
- 1927 Galerie d’Art Contemporain, Paris, France
- 1930 Venice Biennale, Italy
- 1931 Kunstverein Frankfurt am Main, Germany
- 1935 Galeria Milione, Milan, Italy
- 1939 Galerie Jeanne Bucher, Paris, France
- 1949 Galerie Jeanne Bucher, Paris, France
- 1950 Zen 49, Central Collecting Point, Munich, Germany
- 1951 Deutscher Künstlerbund, Hochschule für Bildende Künste, Berlin, Germany
- 1953 Guggenheim Museum, New York, USA
- 1954 Württembergischer Kunstverein, Stuttgart, Germany
- 1955 documenta 1, Kassel, Germany
- 1955 Cercle Volnay, Paris, France
- 1959 documenta II, Kassel, Germany
- 1964 documenta III, Kassel, Germany
- 1965 Wallraf-Richartz-Museum, Cologne, Germany
- 1975 Willi Baumeister: Lithographien und Radierungen, gedruckt von Erich Mönch, State Academy of Fine Arts Stuttgart
- 1979 Willi Baumeister: 1945–1955, Württembergischer Kunstverein, Stuttgart
- 1979 Hommage à Baumeister, State Academy of Fine Arts Stuttgart
- 1989 Nationalgalerie Berlin, Germany
- 1989 Willi Baumeister: Typographie und Reklamegestaltung, State Academy of Fine Arts Stuttgart (and in 1990 Deutscher Werkbund, Frankfurt am Main)
- 1999 Willi Baumeister et la France, Musée d’Unterlinden, Colmar, France
- 2000 Musée d’Art Moderne, Saint-Étienne, France
- 2003 Museo Thyssen Bornemisza, Madrid, Spain
- 2004 Städtische Galerie im Lenbachhaus, Munich, Germany
- 2004 Willi Baumeister – Karl Hofer: Begegnung der Bilder, Museum der bildenden Künste, Leipzig, Germany
- 2005 Bucerius Kunst Forum, Hamburg, Germany
- 2005 Die Frankfurter Jahre 1928–1933, Museum Giersch, Frankfurt am Main, Germany
- 2005 Westfälisches Landesmuseum für Kunst- und Kulturgeschichte, Münster, Germany
- 2006 Von der Heydt-Museum, Wuppertal, Germany
- 2007 Kunstmuseum Stuttgart, Germany
- 2011-2012 Museu Fundación Juan March, Palma, Kunstmuseum Winterthur and MART Museo di arte moderna e contemporanea di, Rovereto

== Literature by and about Willi Baumeister ==
- Westerdahl, Eduardo. Willi Baumeister. Tenerife: Ediciones Gaceta de Arte, 1934
- Baumeister, Willi. Das Unbekannte in der Kunst. Stuttgart, 1947; 2d ed. Cologne (Köln), 1960; 3d ed. Cologne, 1974; 4th ed. Cologne, 1988. (English: The Unknown in Art. Translated by Joann M. Skrypzak and with an essay by Tobias Hoffmann. Willi Baumeister Stiftung, Stuttgart, 2013 ISBN 978-3-8442-5100-5
- Grohmann, Will. Willi Baumeister: Leben und Werk. Cologne [Köln], 1963. 1988 [1965, 1966??]
- Kermer, Wolfgang: Einige Aspekte der Kunstlehre Willi Baumeisters. In: 175 Jahre Friedrich-Eugens-Gymnasium Stuttgart. Stuttgart: Belser, 1971, p. 126-152
- Haftmann, Werner. "Gilgamesch - Einführung." In: Willi Baumeister, Gilgamesch, 5-15. Cologne [Köln], 1976.
- Kermer, Wolfgang: Hommage à Baumeister: Klaus Bendixen, Karl Bohrmann, Peter Brüning, Bruno Diemer, Peter Grau, Klaus Jürgen-Fischer, Emil Kiess, Eduard Micus, Herbert Schneider, Peter Schubert, Friedrich Seitz, Ludwig Wilding. Exh. cat. Stuttgart: Staatliche Akademie der Bildenden Künste Stuttgart, 1979
- Kermer, Wolfgang: Zur Kunstlehre Baumeisters: ein Vorschlag Baumeisters zur Reform des künstlerischen Elementarunterrichts aus dem Jahre 1949. Die Studierenden Willi Baumeisters an der Staatlichen Akademie der bildenden Künste Stuttgart 1946–1955. Verzeichnis der ″Didaktischen Tafeln″. Exhib. cat. Willi Baumeister: 1945–1955, Württembergischer Kunstverein Stuttgart, Cantz, Stuttgart 1979, pp 129–134, 147.
- Ponert, Dietmar J. Willi Baumeister - Werkverzeichnis der Zeichnungen, Gouachen und Collagen. Dietmar J. Ponert in collaboration with Felicitas Karg-Baumeister. Cologne [Köln]: DuMont, 1988.*
- Kermer, Wolfgang: Willi Baumeister - Typographie und Reklamegestaltung. Exh. cat. Stuttgart: Edition Cantz, 1989 ISBN 3-89322-145-X
- Baumeister, Schlemmer und die Üecht-Gruppe: Stuttgarter Avantgarde 1919. Exh. cat. Stuttgart: Hugo Matthaes, 1989.
- Willi Baumeister, Lithographien / Serigraphien: 55 Werke der Zeit 1919 bis 1964. Galerie Schlichtenmaier, cat. no. 109. Grafenau: Galerie Schlichtenmaier, 1991
- Bruns, Jörg Heiko Willi Baumeister. Dresden: Verlag der Kunst, 1991.
- Kermer, Wolfgang: Der schöpferische Winkel: Willi Baumeisters pädagogische Tätigkeit. Ostfildern-Ruit: Edition Cantz, 1992 (Beiträge zur Geschichte der Staatlichen Akademie der Bildenden Künste Stuttgart / ed. Wolfgang Kermer; 7) ISBN 3-89322-420-3
- Boehm, Gottfried. Willi Baumeister. Stuttgart: Hatje, 1995
- Kermer, Wolfgang (ed.): Aus Willi Baumeisters Tagebüchern: Erinnerungen an Otto Meyer-Amden, Adolf Hölzel, Paul Klee, Karl Konrad Düssel und Oskar Schlemmer. Mit ergänzenden Schriften und Briefen von Willi Baumeister. Ostfildern-Ruit: Edition Cantz, 1996 (Beiträge zur Geschichte der Staatlichen Akademie der Bildenden Künste Stuttgart / ed. Wolfgang Kermer; 8) ISBN 3-89322-421-1
- Beye, Peter, and Felicitas Baumeister. Willi Baumeister: Werkkatalog der Gemälde. Ostfildern-Ruit: Hatje Cantz, 2002.
- Kermer, Wolfgang. Willi Baumeister und die Werkbund-Ausstellung "Die Wohnung" Stuttgart 1927. Stuttgart: Staatliche Akademie der Bildenden Künste Stuttgart, 2003 (Beiträge zur Geschichte der Staatlichen Akademie der Bildenden Künste Stuttgart / ed. Wolfgang Kermer; 11) ISBN 3-931485-55-2
- Spielmann, Heinz, and Felicitas Baumeister. Willi Baumeister: Werkkatalog der Druckgraphik. Ostfildern-Ruit: Hatje Cantz, 2005.
- Willi Baumeister: Figuren und Zeichen. Exh. cat. Hamburg, Münster, Wuppertal: Hatje Cantz, 2005.
- Schürle, Wolfgang, and Nicholas J. Conard, eds. Zwei Weltalter. Eiszeitkunst und die Bildwelt Willi Baumeisters. Ostfildern-Ruit: Hatje Cantz, 2005.
- Kermer, Wolfgang (ed.): Über Baumeister: der Künstler und Lehrer im Urteil seiner Schüler. Stuttgart: Staatliche Akademie der Bildenden Künste Stuttgart, 2006 WerkstattReihe / [Staatliche Akademie der Bildenden Künste Stuttgart], ed. Wolfgang Kermer; 15) ISBN 3-931485-77-3
- Im Rampenlicht: Baumeister als Bühnenbildner. Exh. cat. Munich and Berlin: Deutscher Kunstverlag, 2007, ISBN 978-3-422-06775-2
- Chametzky, Peter. Objects as History in Twentieth-Century German Art: Beckmann to Beuys. Berkeley: University of California Press, 2010.ISBN 978-0-520-26042-9

== Quotations about Willi Baumeister ==
- "In my eyes, the name Baumeister takes an extremely important place among those of modern German artists." (Fernand Léger, 1949)
- "He was the most European of German painters." (Will Grohmann, 1959)
- "Willi Baumeister's art belongs to the healthy, natural, appealing appearances." (Wassily Kandinsky, 1935)
- "You are going to have a future, with certainty." (Le Corbusier to Baumeister, 1931)

== See also ==
- List of German painters

== Sources ==
- Grohmann, Will. Willi Baumeister: Leben und Werk. 1963. Cologne [Köln]: DuMont.
- Willi Baumeister: Figuren und Zeichen. Exh. cat. Hamburg, Münster, Wuppertal. Stuttgart: Hatje Cantz, 2005.
