= Cercle et Carré =

20th-century Parisian art collective

Logo for "Cercle et Carré", designed by Pierre Daura in 1929

Cercle et Carré (Circle and Square) was a group of abstract artists in Paris, founded 1929 by Joaquín Torres García, helped by young admirers Michel Seuphor, and Pierre Daura. The idea to form an abstract art group began through conversations between Torres-Garcia, Theo van Doesburg, and Piet Mondrian. The group published a journal with the same name. In April 1930 a 'Cercle et Carré' exhibition in Paris showed an amazing 130 abstract works. The highlight of the group was the inclusion of artists from all over, with both sexes well represented.

"Notre programme fût "Construction", fusse figuratif ou non-figuratif" (Our formula was "Construccion" whether it was figurative or non-figurative).

When the Abstraction-Création was founded in 1931 it absorbed the group.

From 1936 Joaquín Torres García continued publication of the journal from Montevideo in Spanish and French with the title Círculo y Cuadrado "La seconde epoque de "Cercle et Carre" (Circle and Square, the second period) with the same logo. From abroad artists sent letters and articles to be published: Jean Hélion, Piet Mondrian, Umberto Boccioni, etc.

== 1930 Exhibition ==
April 1930 the group opened an exhibition in Galerie 23 at Rue La Boétie with works by Hans Arp, Willi Baumeister, Ingibjörg Stein H. Bjarnason Carl Buchheister, Marcelle Cahn, Franciska Clausen, Jaime A. Colson, Germán Cueto Serge Charchoune, Pierre Daura, Aleksandra Ekster, Fillia, François Foltyn, Jean Gorin, Wanda Chodasiewicz-Grabowska, Huib Hoste, Vilmos Huszar, Vera Idelson, Wassily Kandinsky, Luc Lafnet, Le Corbusier, Fernand Léger, Oscar Luethy, Piet Mondrian, Stefan Moszczynski, Erik Olson, Amédée Ozenfant, Antoine Pevsner, Enrico Prampolini, Luigi Russolo, Alberto Sartoris, Kurt Schwitters, Henri Stazewski, Hechama Szmuszkowicz, Joseph Stella, Hans Suschny, Sophie Taeuber-Arp, Joaquín Torres-García, Vordemberge-Gildewart, Adya Van Rees, Otto van Rees (artist), Georges Vantongerloo, Hans Welti, H.N.Werkman, Wanda Wolska.

== List of issues ==
=== Cercle et Carré ===
Published in Paris, 1930 Círculo y Cuadrado, accessdate=19 Mar 2012

- No. 1 – 15 March 1930
- No. 2 – 15 April 1930
- No. 3 – June 1930

=== Círculo y Cuadrado ===
Published in Montevideo, 1936-1943 Círculo y Cuadrado, accessdate=20 Mar 2012 List of Montevideo issues at Publicaciones Periódicas del Uruguay (issues available as PDF's)

- No. 1 – May 1936
- No. 2 – August 1936
- No. 3 – February 1937
- No. 4 – May 1937
- No. 5 – September 1937
- No. 6 – March 1938
- No. 7 – September 1938
- No. 8, 9 & 10 – September 1943
