= Friedrich Vordemberge-Gildewart =

German painter (1899–1962)

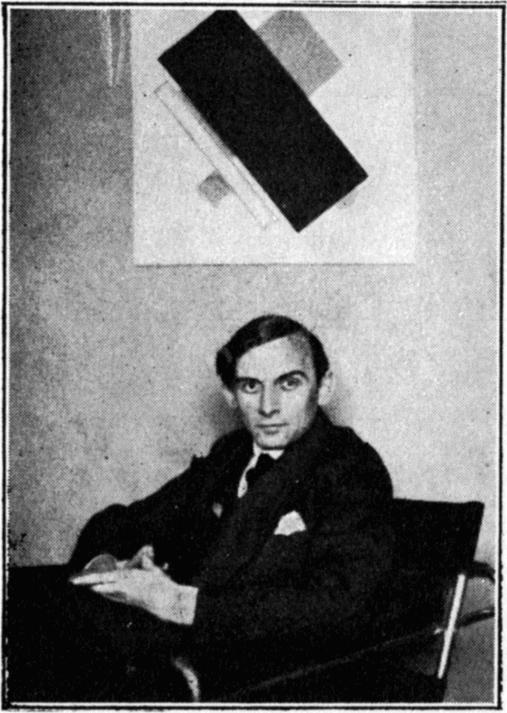
Friedrich Vordemberge-Gildewart

Friedrich Vordemberge-Gildewart (November 17, 1899, Osnabrück, Germany – December 19, 1962, Ulm) was a German Neo-plasticist (De Stijl) painter. He was one of the first painters to work for his entire career within an abstract style.

== Life ==
Friedrich Vordemberge-Gildewart was born in Osnabrück, Germany and studied architecture, interior design and sculpture at Hanover School of Art and the Technical College, Hanover. In 1924 he formed the abstract art group Gruppe K in Hanover with Hans Nitzschke and joined Der Sturm in Berlin. After meeting Theo van Doesburg, Kurt Schwitters and Hans Arp, he became a member of De Stijl in 1925. Together with Kurt Schwitters and Carl Buchheister he formed the 'Abstrakten Hannover' group in 1927. He was a member of a number of other artistic groups including: the Cercle et Carré, 1930, Paris and was a founding member of Abstraction-Création (1931), also in Paris. In 1937, in Munich, the Nazi regime exposed his works in the infamous Degenerate Art exhibition. Most of his works were confiscated and he was forced to leave Germany for the Netherlands.

== Work ==
His works include:-

- 1925, Composition No. 15 - 1925
- 1936, Composition No. 104 - 1936
- 1946, Composition No. 154, oil on canvas, 120 x 80 cm
- 1946, Untitled (C8), collage, paper and plastic on paper, 28.5 x 23.5 cm
- c.1947, Untitled, collage on paper, 27.5 x 22.3 cm
- 1934-48, Composition No. 169 (Diptychon), oil on canvas
- 1953, Composition No. 194, oil on canvas, 50 x 60 cm
- 1959/60, Composition No 212, oil on canvas, 105 x 80 cm
