= Daura (surname) =

Daura is a surname. Notable people with the surname include:

- Lawal Musa Daura (born 1953), Director General of the Nigerian State Security Service beginning in 2015
- Pierre Daura (1896–1976), Spanish-born French painter
- Sani Daura, Nigerian Minister of Agriculture and Rural Development (1999–2000) and Minister of Environment (2000–2001)
