= Franciska Clausen =

Danish painter (1899–1986)

- Born: January 7, 1899; Aabenraa, then in the German Empire
- Died: March 5, 1986 (aged 87); Aabenraa, Denmark
- Known for: Painting
- Movement: Neue Sachlichkeit; Cubism; Purism; Surrealism
- Awards: Thorwaldsen Medaillen 1977, The Danish Arts Foundation's Lifetime Honorary Award 1979

Franciska Clausen (7 January 1899 – 5 March 1986) was a Danish painter who was involved in the abstract art movement of the early twentieth century.

Clausen studied at the Die Grossherzogliche sächsische Hochschule für bildende Kunst in Weimar, Germany (1916–17), at the Women's Academy in Munich (1918–19), at the Royal Danish Academy of Fine Arts, in Copenhagen, Denmark (1920–21), and under Hans Hofmann at the Hofmann Schule Fur Moderne Kunst in Munich (1921–22). She subsequently sought out private lessons from László Moholy-Nagy, Berlin (Sept. – Dec. 1922), from Alexander Archipenko in Berlin in 1923, and under Fernand Léger in Paris (1924–25). She was inspired by László Moholy-Nagy's Constructivist collages. From 1924 to 1928 in Paris, a cubist style can be seen in her paintings with a base in Léger's 'machine style art'. Between 1924 and 1928, Clausen worked in Paris. In the paintings from this period such as Konstruktiv modellstudie (1925), Contre-Composition (1928), and Komposition (1927), the influence of Léger's machine style is clearly visible. In 1933, she taught at the Tegne- og Kunstindustriskolen for Kvinder (Drawing and applied arts school for women) in Copenhagen. Throughout her career, Clausen passed through most of the stages in the development of modern art, and her paintings show elements of Neue Sachlichkeit, Constructivism, Cubism, Neo-plasticism, Surrealism and Purism, though her greatest influence was Léger.

== Involvement in Cercle et carré ==
Cercle et carré was a short-lived collective of abstract artists founded by Joaquín Torres-García and Michel Seuphor in 1929. Clausen likely joined the group through mutual friends or acquaintances. Though she attended the groups meetings, she did not participate in their theoretical discussions. It is possible that Clausen was uncomfortable at these meetings, as she noted later on in her life that the group possessed, in her words, “some latent misogyny: women were not taken seriously.” She exhibited with the group in their only show, in April 1930.

== Exhibitions ==
- L’Art d’aujourd’hui, 1925
- International Societé Anonyme exhibition, 1926
- Salon des Indépendants, late 1920's
- Stockholm Exhibition, 1930
- Cercle et carré exhibition, April 18–30, 1930
- Solo Exhibition, 1932

== See also ==
- Art of Denmark

== Bibliography ==
- H. Hildebrandt: Die Frau als Künstlerin (Berlin: 1928), p. 148
- Troels Andersen: Franciska Clausen, 1974, ISBN 87-418-3633-2.
- Finn Terman Frederiksen: Franciska Clausen, 1987–88, ISBN 87-982663-1-4 .
- Eva Bræmer-Jensen: Franciska Clausen, 1996, ISBN 87-7269-024-0.
