= Jean Gorin =

French painter (1899–1981)

Albert Jean Gorin
- Jean Gorin in 1977
- Born: 2 December 1899; Saint-Émilien-de-Blain, Loire-Atlantique, France
- Died: 29 March 1981 (aged 81); Niort, Deux-Sèvres, France
- Occupation: Painter
- Known for: Neoplastic reliefs

Albert Jean Gorin (2 December 1899 – 29 March 1981) was a French neoplastic painter and constructive sculptor. He was a disciple of Piet Mondrian, and remained true to the concept of rigid geometricism and use of primary colors, but pushed the limits of neoplasticism by introducing circles and diagonals. He was known for his three-dimensional reliefs.

== Early years ==
Albert Jean Gorin was born on 2 December 1899 in Saint-Émilien-de-Blain, Loire-Atlantique. His father made shoes and his mother managed a small hotel with a restaurant. He attended the École des Beaux-Arts in Nantes in 1914–16. After the end of World War I (1914–18) he studied at the Académie de la Grande Chaumière in Paris from 1919–22. He was influenced by Henri Matisse, Vincent van Gogh, Paul Cézanne and the Expressionists.

Gorin was unable to obtain a job teaching drawing. He settled in Nort-sur-Erdre, near Nantes and began painting, while working to earn a living. In 1923 he discovered cubism, and was strongly influenced by the book Du Cubisme (1921) by Albert Gleizes. For a period he painted in cubist style. In 1925 he made his first abstract painting. As an extension of Cubist aesthetics he became interested in furniture design and avant-garde architecture. In 1925 Gorin visited the International Exposition of Modern Industrial and Decorative Arts in Paris where the Pavillon de L’Esprit Nouveau showed work by Amédée Ozenfant and Le Corbusier. For a short period he experimented with Purism.

== Neoplasticism ==
In 1926 Gorin saw for the first time one of Piet Mondrian's neoplastic compositions, and one of Theo van Doesburg's elementarist compositions. He read the pamphlet L’Art et son avenir by Georges Vantongerloo. This led to correspondence with Mondrian and Vantongerloo, and then a meeting with Mondrian the same year, the start of a long friendship. Gorin also met Michel Seuphor, an art critic. Around this time Gorin began painting in the neoplastic style. Gorin's oil on cardboard Composition no. 10 (1926) is an early example of his neoplastic style. It is diamond-shaped, reflecting the influence of Mondrian, and the very thick lines are similar to van Doesburg's work. Gorin exhibited for the first time in April 1928 at Lille with the "S.T.U.C.A.". Others at this show included Mondrian and César Domela.

In 1930 Gorin participated in the first exhibition of Seuphor's recently founded the Cercle et Carré group. At the opening of the exhibition he met Jean Arp, Sophie Taeuber-Arp, Wassily Kandinsky, Otto Freundlich, Joaquín Torres García and Vantongerloo. Mondrian apparently considered that reliefs were a natural step in the evolution of painting towards architecture. He encouraged Gorin to make reliefs. Gorin began to explore neoplastic architecture and decoration. He created his first neoplastic relief in 1930, and created three-dimensional work for the remainder of the inter-war period. Mondrian praised Gorin's relief work highly, saying it went "further" than he himself had taken painting.

In 1931 Gorin was one of the founders of the 1940 association of artists. He exhibited there with Mondrian and Theo van Doesburg. He also participated in the new Abstraction-Création group of painters. In 1932 he went to the Soviet Union to study art and architecture. On the way he met Naum Gabo in Berlin. Later he met constructivist architects Moisei Ginzburg and Konstantin Melnikov. The work of the Russian constructivist Kazimir Malevich was to have a major influence on his work, if secondary to that of Mondrian. In 1934 Gorin joined the Association Abstraction-Création. In 1936 Gorin helped edit the last issue of the Abstraction-Création—Art Non-Figuratif almanac, for a membership of almost four hundred. In 1937 he sold his house in Nort-sur-Erdre and destroyed much of his work, then moved to Le Vésinet. During World War II (1939–45) Gorin was conscripted into the army. He became a prisoner of war in 1942.

After being released, in 1944 Gorin resumed painting. He also began creating reliefs using planes set in space, and continued to study architecture. He settled in Grasse for a while, where he had a shop in which he sold objects d’art and decoration. In 1946 Gorin, Auguste Herbin and Albert Gleizes launched the Salon des Réalités Nouvelles, the first of a series of annual exhibitions devoted to "abstract/concrete/constructivist/non-figurative art." Gorin participated in many other exhibitions of abstract art in Europe and the United States. Gorin often moved in the years that followed. He would make and photograph sculptures, then destroy them since he did not have space to keep them. He did not gain full recognition until major retrospectives were held between 1965 and 1973 in Nantes, Amsterdam, Paris, Grenoble and Saint Etienne.

Gorin drew up plans for a house which was built in the St. Pezenne district of Niort in 1967-68. The "white cube" is inconspicuous, but is essentially a neoplastic work, with interlocking geometric shapes. However, planning restrictions prevented him painting it in primary colors. The house is small, with a main room, bedroom and kitchen, and a bathroom that can only be accessed from the outside. Gorin and his wife were naturists, and ate only vegetables from his garden. Although he made the house his base for the rest of his life, he also stayed in a house he owned in Meudon, and traveled extensively.

Jean Gorin died on 29 March 1981 in Niort, Deux-Sèvres. His wife, Susan Gorin, died in 1995 and his property at Niort was put up for sale. Surprisingly, no effort was made to protect the house, the only one of his architectural projects to be realized.

== Work ==
=== Style ===
Gorin was the greatest French disciple of Mondrian, but pushed the principles of neoplasticism further than others by using reliefs, which developed into wall sculptures. He always used the primary colors of bright red, light yellow and ultramarine blue on white and black backgrounds. His polychrome sculptures were very unusual for the time. He broke from Mondrian's rule of allowing only horizontal and vertical lines. While remaining true to neoplasticist geometric rigor, he introduced circles and diagonals. The angles may be unexpected, far from 45°. Between 1958 and 1962 Gorin was absorbed in painting the contrast between the circle and the linear network. After that he returned to relief. His works were now truly three-dimensional, designed to retain harmony while viewed from different angles rather than as compositions seen only from the front.

An example of later work is his Construction spatiale verticale n°101. It was made between 1968 and 1971 and is held in the French National Museum of Modern Art. A copy was made in 1983 under the direction of Serge Lemoine and is held by the University of Burgundy. The monumental sculpture is 9 metres (30 ft) high and 1.5 metres (4 ft 11 in) wide, made of carefully balanced geometric shapes of steel and aluminum painted in primary colors. Some of Gorin's works may be seen in the Musée des Beaux-Arts in Nantes and the Pompidou Centre in Paris. The Museum of Grenoble holds several hundred of his works.

=== Exhibitions ===
Exhibitions included:

- 1928, Lille: Neoplastic work with the STUCA group
- 1929–*1930: Exhibition with the Cercle et Carré group created by Michel Seuphor and Torrès-Garcia.
- 1930, Nantes: with the L’Etrave artistic group
- 1931, Paris: Display of his first relief in an exhibition of Groupe *1940
- 1945, Paris: Exposition Art concret, Galerie René Drouin.
- 1946: Salon des Réalités Nouvelles, of which he was secretary
- 1948, New York: Exposition of abstract constructive art
- 1957, Paris: 50 years of abstract paintings organized by the Creuze gallery. First one-man show at the Galerie Colette Allendy
- 1958, Saint-Étienne: The first generations of abstract art
- 1960, Liège: Musée de l’Art Wallon
- 1965, Nantes: Retrospective at the Musée des Beaux-Arts
- 1966, Chicago: Exposition at the Kazimir Gallery
- 1967, Amsterdam: Retrospective at the Stedelijk Museum
- 1969, Paris: Retrospective at the Centre national d’art contemporain
- 1974, Paris: Exhibition at the Galerie Denise René
- 1977, Nantes: Retrospective at the Musée des Beaux-Arts
- 1977, Paris: Centre Pompidou
- 1999, Blain: Hommage du mouvement Madi à Gorin, Château de la Groulais
- 1999, Grenoble: Exposition Jean Gorin

=== Writings ===
His writings included

- Mondrian, De Stijl and their Impact, Marlborough Gallery in New York (1964)

== Sources ==
- Bann, Stephen (1974). The Tradition of Constructivism. Da Capo Press. ISBN 978-0-306-80396-3.
- Blotkamp, Carel (2001). Mondrian: The Art of Destruction. Reaktion Books. ISBN 978-1-86189-100-6.
- Bois, Yves Alain (1982). "Jean GORIN (1899-1981)". Universalia.
- "Blue Composition, 1975". James Kinmont Fine Art. Archived from the original on 2014-08-19.
- "Construction spatiale verticale n°101". Université de Bourgogne. Archived from the original on 2014-08-10.
- Fillaud, Amélie (July 2002). "Jean Gorin l'habitat, art total" (PDF). L'Actualité Poitou-Charentes. Archived from the original (PDF) on 2014-08-19.
- "Jean Gorin (1899-1981)". BNF.
- "Jean Gorin". Lisbon: Museu Coleção Berardo.
- Stiles, Kristine; Selz, Peter Howard (1996). Theories and Documents of Contemporary Art: A Sourcebook of Artists' Writings. University of California Press. p. 64. ISBN 978-0-520-20251-1.
