= Graf-Engelbert-Schule =

High school in Bochum, Germany

Coordinates: 51.466°N 7.220°E

Graf-Engelbert School
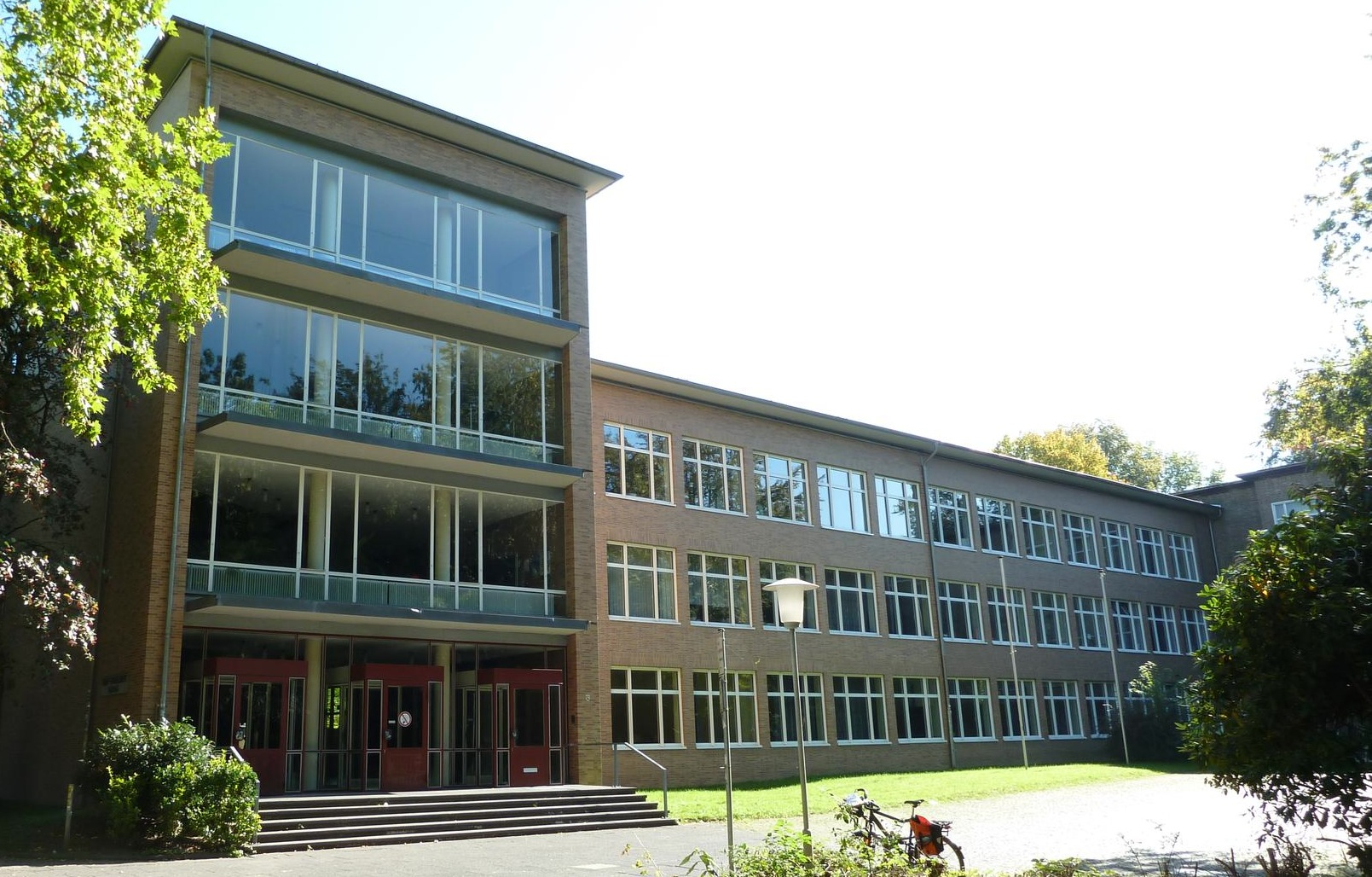

Location
- Bochum, Germany

Information
- Type: High school
- Established: 1910

Graf-Engelbert School is an urban high school for boys and girls in Bochum, Germany. Near the center of the city and the tree-lined Königsallee, it is located on Else-Hirsch-Straße. Else Hirsch was a teacher in Bochum during the Nazi era and organized ten children's transports, saving many lives, though she herself was murdered in the Holocaust.

Graf-Engelbert School is only a few hundred meters from the Schiller School (also a high school). Due to that proximity, there are common courses (also including the Albert-Einstein-Schule) in all subjects in the upper classes.

At one point, Graf-Engelbert was a boys-only high school, but was combined with a girls' high school which was then located near the Schiller School. Currently, 67 teachers teach approximately 930 students at Graf-Engelbert.

== Notable alumni ==
- Wolfgang Clement, politician
- Gerhard Charles Rump, author on art history and the theory of contemporary art, art history teacher, curator, gallerist and photo artist
- Otto Schily, politician
