= Saint-Cirq-Lapopie =

- Commune
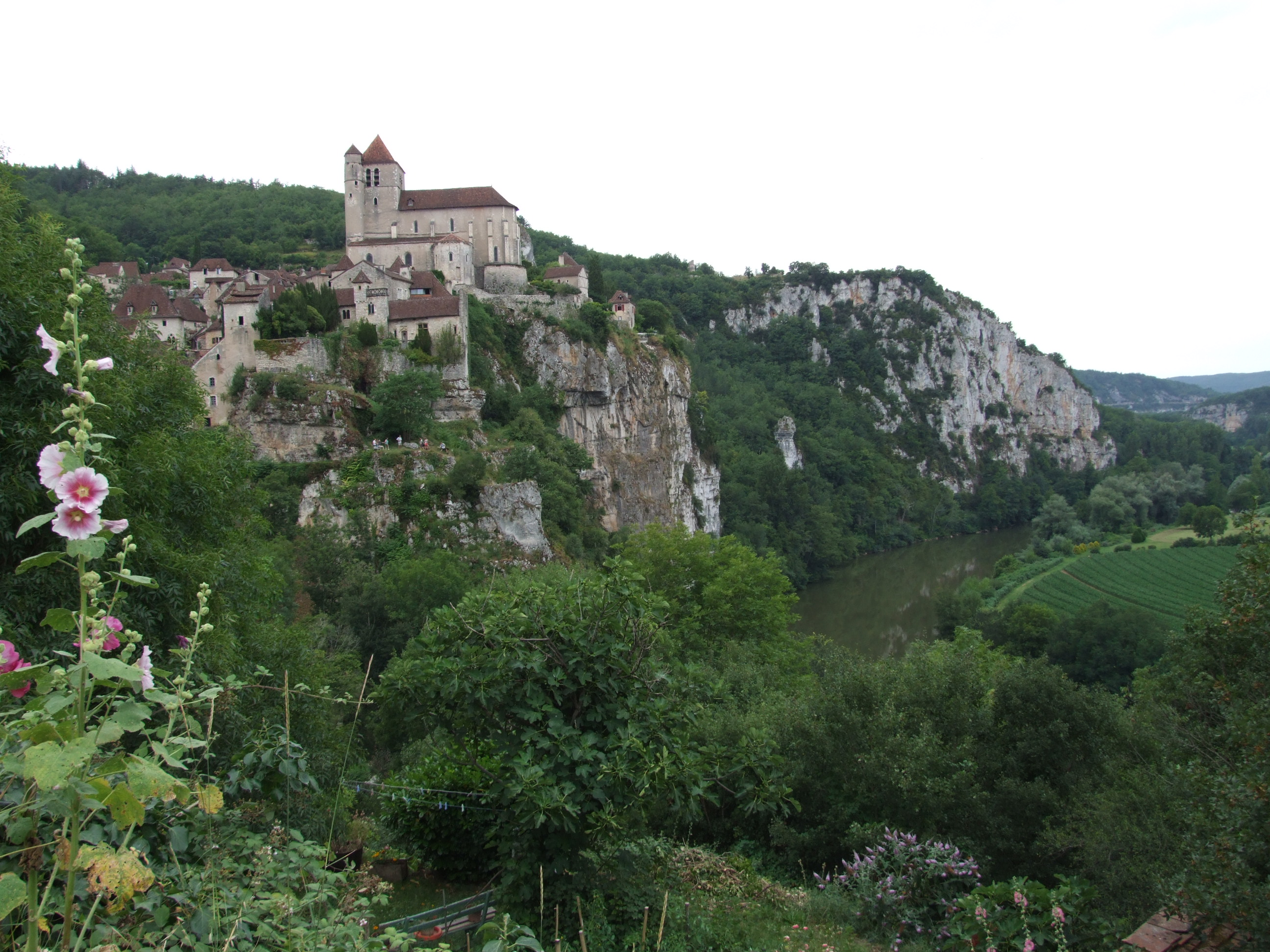
- Saint-Cirq-Lapopie overlooking the Lot River

- Coat of arms
- Location of Saint-Cirq-Lapopie
- Location within France Location within Occitanie
- Coordinates: 44°27′55″N 1°40′14″E
- Country: France
- Region: Occitania
- Department: Lot
- Arrondissement: Cahors
- Canton: Causse et Vallées
- Intercommunality: CA Grand Cahors

Government
  - Mayor (2023–2026): Frédéric Decremps
- Area^{1}: 17.89 km^{2} (6.91 sq mi)
- Elevation: 320 m (1,050 ft)
- Highest elevation: 389 m (1,276 ft)
- Lowest elevation: 120 m (390 ft)
- Population (2023): 201
  - Density: 11.2/km^{2} (29.1/sq mi)
- Time zone: UTC+01:00 (CET)
  - Summer (DST): UTC+02:00 (CEST)
- INSEE/Postal code: 46256 /46330
- ^{1} French Land Register data, which excludes lakes, ponds, glaciers > 1 km^{2} (0.386 sq mi or 247 acres) and river estuaries.

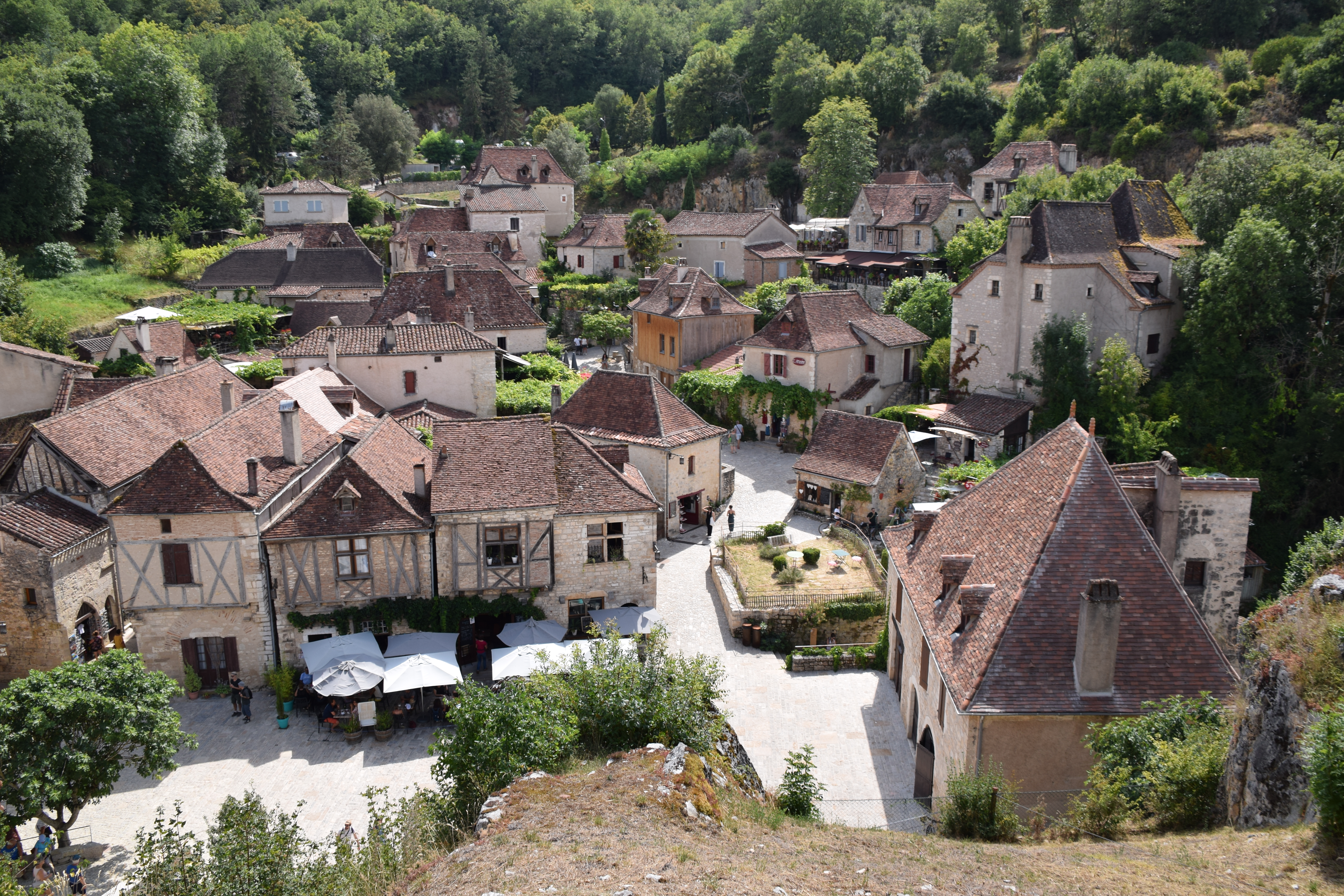
View of the town center

Saint-Cirq-Lapopie (French pronunciation: [sɛ̃ siʁk lapɔpi]; Occitan: Sent Circ de la Pòpia) is a commune in the Lot department in south-western France. It is a member of the Les Plus Beaux Villages de France (The most beautiful villages in France) association.

Its position on a steep cliff 100m above the river, originally selected for defence, has helped make the town one of the most popular tourist destinations in the department, and the town is almost a museum. After being 'discovered' by the Post-Impressionist Henri Martin it became popular with other artists and the home of the writer André Breton.

== Location ==
Saint-Cirq-Lapopie is 30 km east of Cahors, in the regional natural park Parc naturel régional des Causses du Quercy. The village overlooks the Lot River.

== History ==
The stronghold of Saint-Cirq-Lapopie was the main seat of one of the four viscounties that made up Quercy, divided among four feudal dynasties, the Lapopie, Gourdon, Cardaillac and Castelnau families.

== Way of St James ==
Saint-Cirq-Lapopie is on the French pilgrimage route, Way of St. James. Coming from Cabrerets pilgrims would pass through and then continue to Cahors, visiting St Stephen's cathedral.

== Notable people ==
- Charles Rappoport (1865–1941) – Lithuanian-born militant communist politician, journalist and writer
- Poet André Breton spent time there in the 1950s in his 'auberge des Mariniers'.
- Artist Pierre Daura lived there for many years.

== Popularity ==
The Guardian reported in July 2012 that the village received 400,000 visitors each year, mostly from within France, and that it had become "besieged by tourists" since winning a popularity vote on a French television programme in June 2012.

== See also ==
- Communes of the Lot department
