= Gerhard Charles Rump =

German art historian (1947–2020)

Gerhard Charles Rump (1947 in Bochum, Germany - 2020 in Berlin, Germany) was an author on art history and the theory of contemporary art, emeritus art history teacher at Technische Universität Berlin, curator, gallerist and photo artist.

== Biography and career ==
Born in Bochum on February 24, 1947, he finished the Graf-Engelbert-Schule (Gymnasium) in 1967 and studied Art History, English Language and Literature, Philosophy, Pedagogy and Psychology at the Ruhr-Universität Bochum from 1968 to 1972; later also Anthropology at the Rheinische-Friedrich-Wilhelms-Universität in Bonn. He received his PhD with a book on the British 18th-century portrait painter George Romney in 1972. He became a curator at the University of Bochum’s University Library. In 1974, he went to Bonn University as Assistant Professor for Art History. In 1983, he left the University to become a freelance journalist for the national newspapers “Die Welt” and “Rheinischer Merkur” as well as a number of regional journals like “Kölnische Rundschau” and “Bonner Rundschau”. Concurrently he worked as an asset consultant for “Deutsche Vermögensberatung”. In 1986-87, he was curator of monuments for the city of Wesel (Germany), but joined the computer printer manufacturer Mannesmann Tally (now TallyDascom) in 1987 as corporate communications manager to become the company’s marketing director a few years later. In 1987, he had his Habilitation at the University of Duisburg. In 1994, he returned to journalism as an art market editor for “Die Welt” while he pursued researching on art and art history and gained some renown as a media theorist, particularly on art communication and semiotics. He also pursued his career as an artist photographer. In 2009, he contributed to Konstantin Akinsha's article on Russian avant garde which won the Association for Women in Communications' "Clarion Award". In 2010, he finally left “Die Welt” in order to focus on his activities as university teacher and essayist, as art journalist and curator. In 2011, Catrin Rothe, Bernhard Ailinger and Gerhard Charles Rump founded the now only virtual art project and producers’ "RAR Gallery" — Berlin, New York (NY) and Palo Alto (CA).

== Publications (selected) ==
Rump authored among other titles:

- Gerhard Charles Rump: Rekonstruktionen. Positionen zeitgenössischer Kunst. B&S Siebenhaar Verlag, Berlin 2010 ISBN 978-3-936962-36-9
- Gerhard Charles Rump / Jürgen Raap: Stephan Kaluza: Abfolgen. Edition Vits, Düsseldorf 2005
- Gerhard Charles Rump: runningMARS. Kunstforum Niederrhein, Emmerich 2004 (Exhibition catalog)
- Gerhard Charles Rump / Natascha Plankermann: Kate Waters. Twentyfourseven. Galerie Voss, Düsseldorf 2003 (Exhibition catalog)
- Gerhard Charles Rump (a.o.): Mythos und Moderne. Edvard Frank, Leben und Werk. Eine Biographie mit Briefen. Rathaus Galerie, Euskirchen 1999
- Gerhard Charles Rump: London Yesterday, Gingko Press, Berkeley Ca, Kunstverlag Weingarten, Weingarten 1998
- Gerhard Charles Rump / Peter Weiermair: Günter Blum. Venus. Ed. Braus, Heidelberg 1997
- Gerhard Charles Rump: Kunstwissenschaft und Verhaltensforschung. Studien zu verhaltensbiologischen Motivationen in künstlerischen Darstellungen. Deparade Verlag, Soest 1993 ISBN 3-929352-03-6
- Gerhard Charles Rump: Raimer Jochims / Gotthard Graubner. Inter Nationes (Fine Arts), Bonn 1986
- Gerhard Charles Rump: Vergangenheitsrechnen. (Folia Pataphysica, 4) CMZ-Verlag, Rheinbach-Merzbach 1986
- Gerhard Charles Rump: How to Look at an Abstract Painting. Inter Nationes (Fine Arts), Bonn 1985
- Gerhard Charles Rump: Pferde und Jagdbilder in der englischen Kunst. Studien zu George Stubbs und dem Genre der "Sporting Art" von 1650-1830. Olms, Hildesheim, New York 1983 ISBN 3-487-07425-7
- Gerhard Charles Rump (ed.): Gefängnis und Paradies: Momente in der Geschichte eines Motivs. Habelt, Bonn 1982
- Gerhard Charles Rump: Geschichte als Paradigma: Zur Reflexion des Historischen in der Kunst. Habelt, Bonn 1982
- Gerhard Charles Rump / Heindrichs, Wilfried (eds.): Interaktionsanalysen. Aspekte dialogischer Kommunikation. Gerstenberg, Hildesheim 1982 ISBN 3-8067-1001-5
- Gerhard Charles Rump: Kunstpsychologie. Kunst und Psychoanalyse. Kunstwissenschaft. Psychologische, Anthropologische, Semiotische Versuche zur Kunstwissenschaft. Olms, Hildesheim, New York 1981
- Gerhard Charles Rump (ed.): Carl Buchheister (1890-1964). Ausgewählte Schriften und Briefe. Gerstenberg, Hildesheim 1980 ISBN 3-8067-0791-X
- Gerhard Charles Rump / Wilfried Heindrichs (eds.): Dialoge. Beiträge zur Interaktions- und Diskursanalyse. Gerstenberg, Hildesheim 1979
- Gerhard Charles Rump (ed.): Kunst und Kunsttheorie des XVIII. Jahrhunderts in England. Studien zum Wandel ästhetischer Anschauungen 1650-1830. Gerstenberg, Hildesheim 1979
- Gerhard Charles Rump: Medium und Kunst. Olms, Hildesheim, New York, 1978 ISBN 3-487-06743-9
- Gerhard Charles Rump: Bildstruktur - Erkenntnisstruktur: Gegenseitige Bedingungen von Kunst und Verhalten. A. Henn Verlag, Kastellaun 1978
- Gerhard Charles Rump: Friedrich Gräsel. In: Bildhauer heute, vol. 2. Gerstenberg, Hildesheim 1978
- Gerhard Charles Rump: George Romney (1734-1802). Zur Bildform der Bürgerlichen Mitte in der Englischen Neoklassik. 2 vols. Olms, Hildesheim, New York 1974 ISBN 3-487-05107-9
- Gerhard Charles Rump (ed.): Sprachnetze. Studien zur literarischen Sprachverwendung. Mit Beiträgen zu Rainer Werner Fassbinder, Agatha Christie, André Breton und James Joyce. Olms, Hildesheim, New York 1976 ISBN 3-487-06087-6
