= Saint-Émilien-de-Blain =

- Location within France
- Coordinates: 47.433247°N 1.711903°W
- Country: France
- Region: Pays de la Loire
- Department: Loire-Atlantique
- Commune: Blain
- Postal code: 44130

Saint-Émilien-de-Blain (Breton: Sant-Emilian-ar-Blan) is a village and parish in France, part of the commune of Blain, Loire-Atlantique.

The parish and village are named after Saint Émilien, Bishop of Nantes, who died when trying to save the city from the Arabs during their invasion of 725. The church at Saint-Émilien was built in 1844–54 on the central square of the village, and the bell tower added in 1868. The spire was never added due to lack of funds. The church has a typical cross-shaped layout, with a large nave and two transept arms.

The neoplastic painter and sculptor Jean Gorin (1899–1981) was born in Saint-Émilien.
