= Blain, Loire-Atlantique =

Blain Blaen (Gallo & Breton) Blin/Byein (Gallo)
- Commune
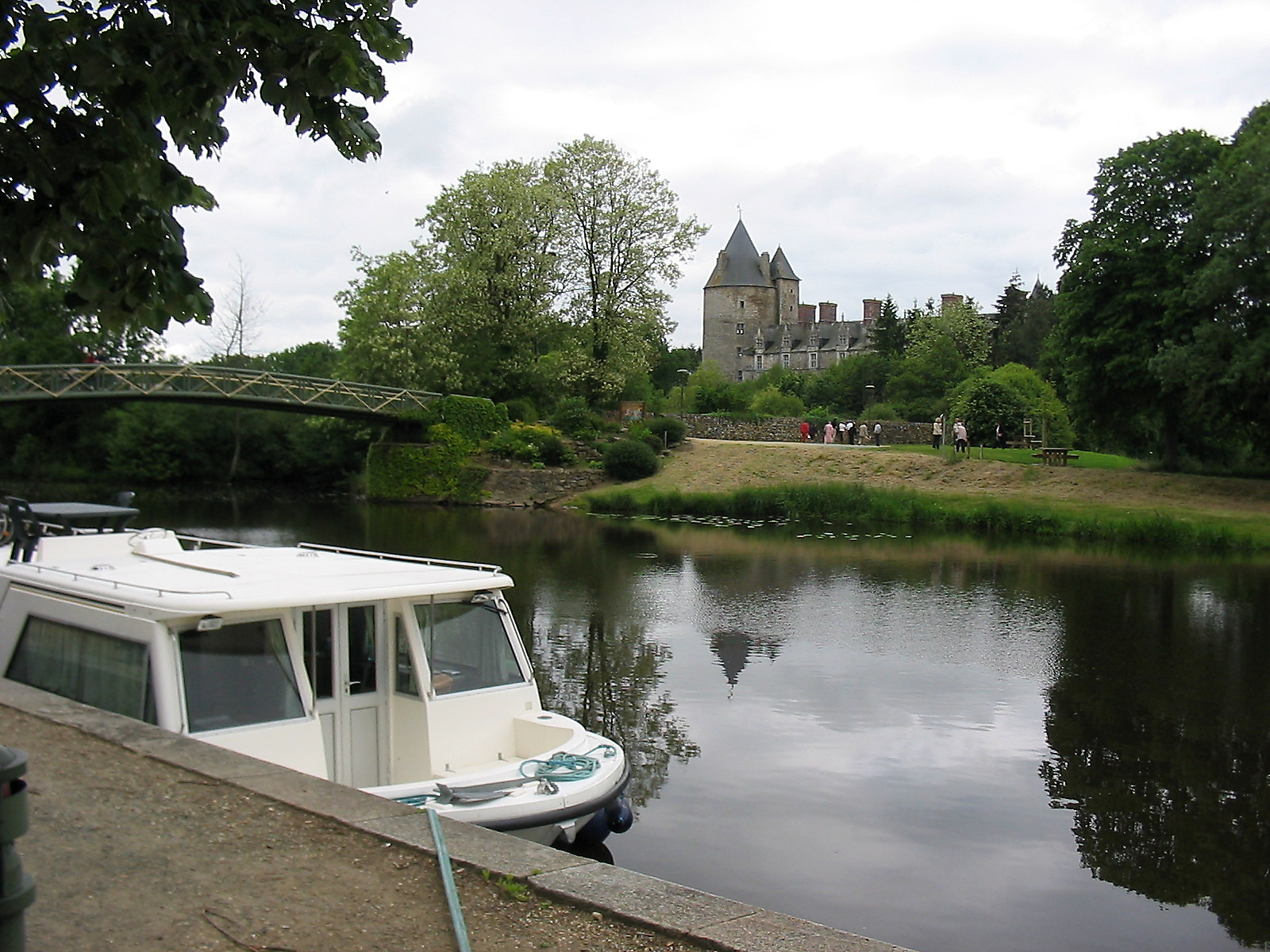
- Nantes-Brest Canal and the Château de Blain

- Coat of arms
- Location of Blain
- Location within France Location within Pays de la Loire
- Coordinates: 47°28′37″N 1°45′44″W
- Country: France
- Region: Pays de la Loire
- Department: Loire-Atlantique
- Arrondissement: Châteaubriant-Ancenis
- Canton: Blain
- Intercommunality: CC Pays de Blain

Government
  - Mayor (2020–2026): Jean-Michel Buf
- Area^{1}: 101.72 km^{2} (39.27 sq mi)
- Highest elevation: 44 m (144 ft)
- Lowest elevation: 7 m (23 ft)
- Population (2023): 10,376
  - Density: 102.01/km^{2} (264.19/sq mi)
- Time zone: UTC+01:00 (CET)
  - Summer (DST): UTC+02:00 (CEST)
- INSEE/Postal code: 44015 /44130
- ^{1} French Land Register data, which excludes lakes, ponds, glaciers > 1 km^{2} (0.386 sq mi or 247 acres) and river estuaries.

Blain (French pronunciation: [blɛ̃]; Gallo: Blaen, Blin or Byein, Breton: Blaen) is a commune in the Loire-Atlantique department in western France. The commune includes the small town of Blain and the villages of Saint-Émilien-de-Blain and La Chaussée.

== Population ==
Historical population

Year	Pop.	±% p.a.
1793	4,085	—
1800	4,500	+1.39%
1806	4,215	−1.08%
1821	4,476	+0.40%
1831	4,899	+0.91%
1841	5,441	+1.05%
1846	5,896	+1.62%
1851	6,170	+0.91%
1856	6,502	+1.05%
1861	6,781	+0.84%
1866	6,865	+0.25%
1872	6,825	−0.10%
1876	6,807	−0.07%
1881	6,660	−0.44%
1886	6,728	+0.20%
1891	6,787	+0.17%
1896	6,601	−0.55%
1901	6,618	+0.05%

Year	Pop.	±% p.a.
1906	6,737	+0.36%
1911	6,625	−0.33%
1921	5,962	−1.05%
1926	5,880	−0.28%
1931	5,978	+0.33%
1936	5,851	−0.43%
1946	5,801	−0.09%
1954	5,659	−0.31%
1962	6,531	+1.81%
1968	7,052	+1.29%
1975	7,153	+0.20%
1982	7,366	+0.42%
1990	7,434	+0.11%
1999	7,733	+0.44%
2007	8,799	+1.63%
2012	9,491	+1.53%
2017	9,793	+0.63%
2023	10,376	+0.97%

Source: EHESS and INSEE (1968-2023)

== International relations ==
Blain is twinned with the market town of Royal Wootton Bassett, England.

== See also ==
- Château de Blain
- Communes of the Loire-Atlantique department
