= Victor Servranckx =

Belgian abstract painter

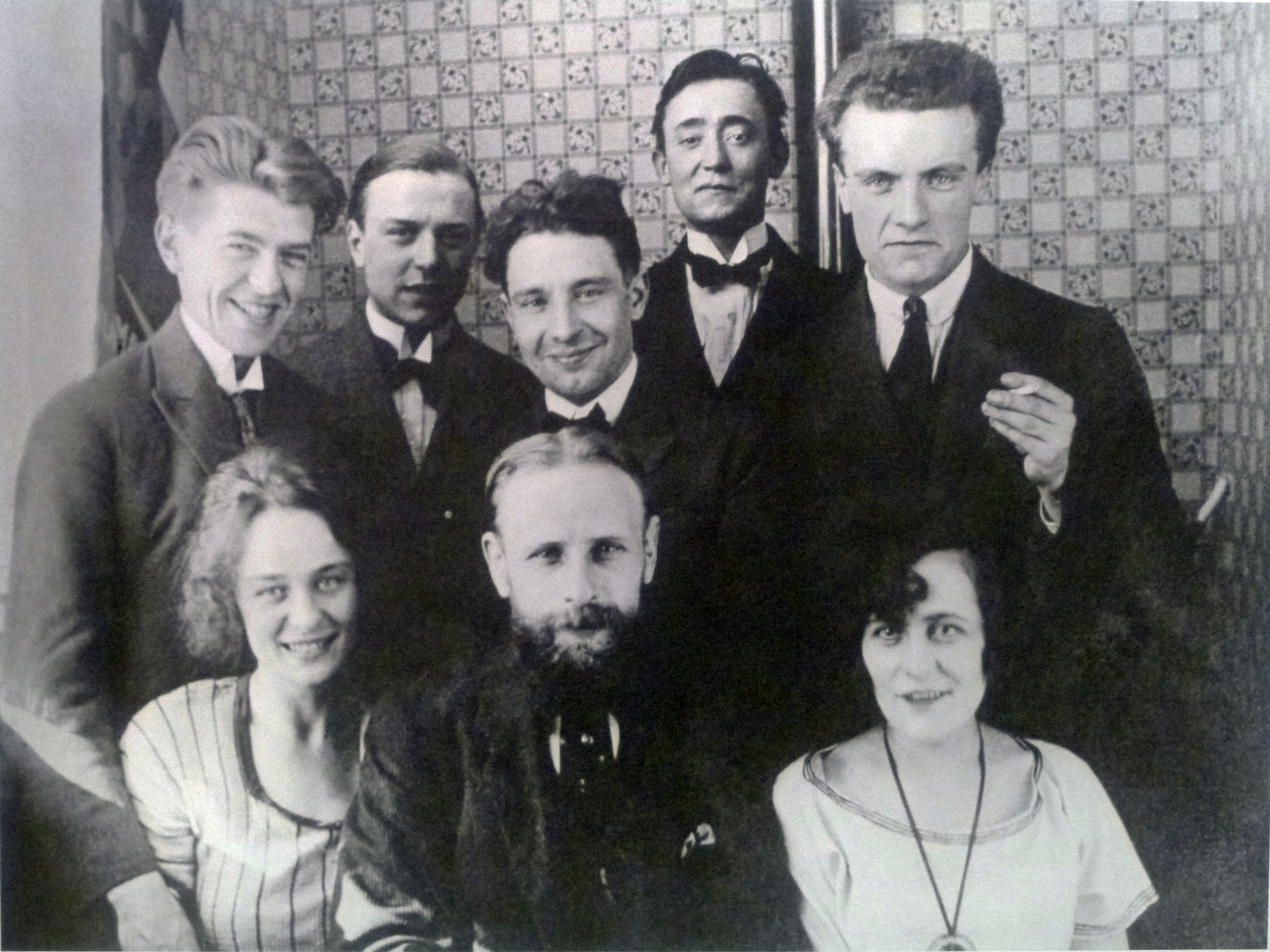
- Portrait of several Belgian artists (June 1922); top left: René Magritte; top; third from left: Victor Servranckx
- Born: Victor Servranckx; 26 June 1897; Diegem (Machelen), Belgium
- Died: 11 December 1965 (aged 68)
- Education: Brussels Royal Academy of Fine Arts
- Occupation: Painter
- Movement: Cubism, constructivism, and surrealism

Victor Servranckx (26 June 1897 – 11 December 1965) was a Belgian abstract painter and designer.

Servranckx was born in Diegem (Machelen) and studied from 1913 to 1917 at the Brussels Royal Academy of Fine Arts in Brussels. There, in 1916, he met René Magritte, with whom he wrote "Pure Art: A Defence of the Aesthetic" in 1922. Servranckx's style was influenced by cubism, constructivism, and surrealism. He died in Vilvoorde.
