= Württembergischer Kunstverein Stuttgart =

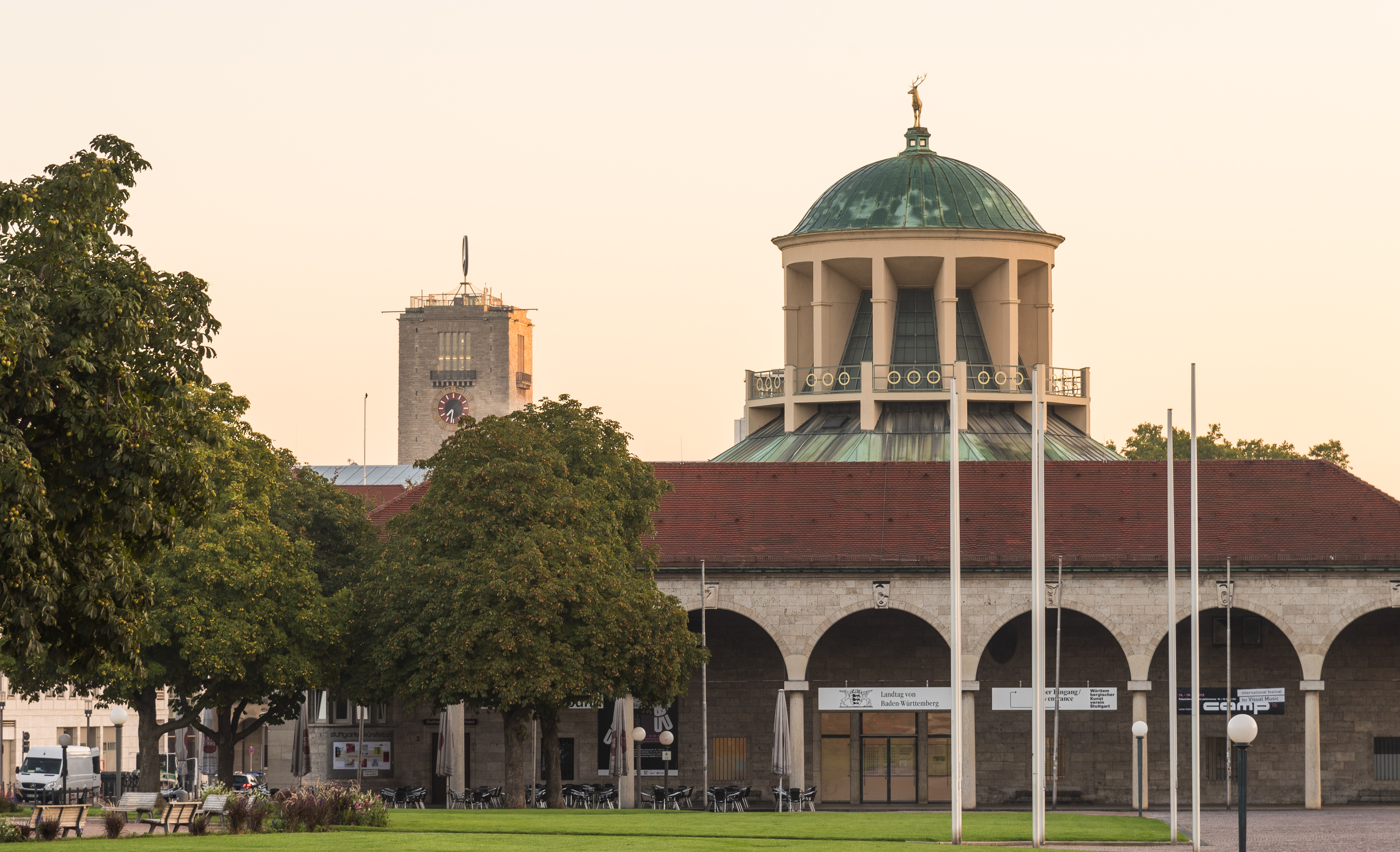
Württembergischer Kunstverein Stuttgart general view

The Württembergischer Kunstverein Stuttgart was founded in 1827 and is one of the oldest art associations in Germany. The association, which today has around 3,000 members, is based in the Kunstgebäude Stuttgart and is dedicated to communicating contemporary art. The curator and publicist Martin Fritz has been the chairman of the Württembergischer Kunstverein, which belongs to the Arbeitsgemeinschaft Deutscher Kunstvereine (ADKV), since 2018.

It is an exhibition center for contemporary painting, graphics, photography, video art, installation, performance and architecture. The association is currently setting a number of focal points, which serve as a thematic background for the exhibition program and for other activities such as lectures, conferences or the awarding of scholarships.

== History ==
One of the founding fathers of the Württembergischer Kunstverein was the lawyer and painter Carl Urban Keller, who initially ran the association as a voluntary curator. The aim of the association was to get the bourgeoisie interested in art, as well as to purchase, exhibit and raffle works by local artists. As with other art associations that were founded at the time, membership consisted in the purchase of shares, with which one could take part in the raffle and thus acquire art privately.

The Württembergischer Kunstverein has been based in the art building on Schloßplatz designed by Theodor Fischer since 1913 and has seen itself as a place for dealing with contemporary art ever since. In the 1930s, like all art associations, it was brought into line under the National Socialist government in the Reich Chamber of Culture. In March 1933, for example, the first major retrospective of Oskar Schlemmer, with his main work Bauhaus Stairs, was closed by the new rulers before it even opened.

The art building was almost completely destroyed during the Second World War. The reconstruction, which is linked to a modern extension building, was only completed in 1961. The gallery of the city of Stuttgart also moved into the rooms of the art building with the Kunstverein, which now consists of the historic complex with a domed hall and gallery rooms, the new so-called quadrangular hall designed by Paul Bonatz and Günther Wilhelm, and a glass connecting wing between the old and new buildings.

In 2005, the gallery of the city of Stuttgart moved out of the art building and moved into the new art museum just a few hundred meters away. Since 2012, the Württembergischer Kunstverein has been permanently located in the new complex of the art building.

The exhibition The Beast is Sovereign, conceived together with the Museu d'Art Contemporani de Barcelona (MACBA), was named Exhibition of the Year in 2015 by the German art critics' association AICA.

== Directors ==
- Alice Widensohler (1946–1965)
- Dieter Honisch (1965–1968)
- Uwe M. Schneede (1968–1973)
- Tilman Osterwold (1973–1993)
- Martin Hentschel (1994–2000)
- Andreas Jürgensen (2001–2003)
- Hans D. Christ and Iris Dressler (since 2005)
