= Pierre Daura =

Catalan artist

Pierre Daura, "Self Portrait in White", oil on canvas

Pierre Daura (in Catalan: Pere Francesc Daura i Garcia February 21, 1896 – January 1, 1976) was a Catalan artist.

He was born on Menorca, Balearic Islands, Spain, a few days before his parents returned to their home in Barcelona and registered his birth there as February 21, 1896. In Paris, in 1914, his French identity papers were issued with Pierre as his given name, and that is how he is usually known; however, he is known as Pere where Catalan is spoken.

Daura's father, Joan Daura Sendra (or in Spanish: Juan Daura y Sendra), was a musician in the Barcelona Liceu Orchestra and a textile merchant. His godfather was the famed cellist Pablo Casals. His mother, Rosa de Lima Garcia y Martínez, died when he was seven. He and two younger siblings, Ricardo and Mercedes, were raised by their father, who never remarried.

Daura received his art education at the Academy of Fine Arts in Barcelona, known as "La Llotja". His teachers included José Ruiz y Blasco (Pablo Picasso's father) and Josep Calvo. Whilst at La Llotja he also worked with the stage designer Joaquim Jiménez i Solà. At age fourteen, with his young friends Emili Bosch i Roger and Agapit Vidal Salichs, he set up a studio and sold his first painting at his inaugural exhibition to the Catalan artist and collector Eduard Pascual Monturiol, who said it reminded him of Paul Cézanne's work. In 1914, Calvo urged Daura to go to Paris to pursue his art career. He arrived there in the early summer that year and first worked in the studio of Émile Bernard, with whom he was friends for many years. Later, he studied engraving under André Lambert.

From 1917 to 1920, Daura served his three years of compulsory Spanish military service on Menorca and then returned to Paris In 1923, whilst painting a mural in Normandy, the scaffolding collapsed. He was badly injured and his left hand became permanently useless because of nerve damage. From 1925 to 1927, Daura and Gustavo Cochet, an Argentine artist, designed and made batik material for couturiers, until fire destroyed their studio and business.

In the 1920s, Daura frequently exhibited with the group Agrupacio d'Artistes Catalans, usually in Barcelona. In 1922 and 1926 he exhibited at the Salon d'Automne in Paris, but in 1928 he joined four others rejected by the Salon, Joaquín Torres García, Jean Hélion, Ernest Engel-Rozier, and Alfred Aberdam, and held a critically acclaimed exhibition at Gallery Marck: Cinq Peintres Refusés par le Jury du Salon. Daura had met Torres-Garcia in 1925, encouraged him to move to Paris, and arranged for Torres-Garcia's first show there, at Gallery A.G. Fabre in 1926.

In 1927, Daura met Louise Heron Blair of Richmond, Virginia, who was studying art in Paris, and they married in 1928. Several years later, Louise's sister married Hélion.

In 1929–30, Daura joined Michel Seuphor and Torres-Garcia in organizing the group Cercle et Carré (Circle and Square), which promoted geometric construction and abstraction in opposition to Surrealism. Cercle et Carré included Jean Arp, Wassily Kandinsky, Fernand Léger, Piet Mondrian, Antoine Pevsner, Kurt Schwitters, Joseph Stella, Georges Vantongerloo, and others. Daura designed the group's logo, which appeared on stationery, posters, and the three issues of a review; Torres-Garcia also used it later for his Círculo y Cuadrado (a name that also translates as Circle and Square) group in Uruguay. The only Cercle et Carré exhibition was held at Gallery 23, in Paris in April 1930. Virtually ignored by the French press at the time, Cercle et Carré is now considered of great importance in the history of modern art.

Pierre Daura, "F1", 1928–1930, oil on canvas, 24 cm x 33 cm

The Dauras visited the medieval cliffside village of Saint-Cirq-Lapopie, France, whilst on their honeymoon in 1929. Daura had sketched in the village in 1914 and had admired the terracotta-roofed houses clustered around the towering church. One particular thirteenth-century house, although in bad condition, had especially intrigued him, and in 1929 he and Louise purchased it. They moved to St. Cirq in May 1930 and began the house restoration project that continued for most of their lives. Their only child, Martha, was born September 24, 1930.

Daura won the St. Cecilia prize (4,000 pesetas) at a painting competition at the Monastery of Montserrat (Santa Maria de Montserrat, Catalonia, Spain), in 1931, and used the money for a painting trip to Deya (Deià), Mallorca, during the winter of 1931/32.

Daura exhibited frequently in the years prior to the Spanish Civil War, with solo exhibitions in Paris at Gallery René Zivy in 1928, in Barcelona at Gallery Badrinas in 1929 and 1931, at Gallery Syra 1932 and 1933, and at Gallery Barcino in 1935.

Daura, with his family, made his first trip to the United States in 1934–35, where he and Martha met Louise's family. Many Virginia landscapes he painted during this period were sold at the Gallery Barcino exhibition in Barcelona.

In February 1937, at the age of forty-one, Daura joined the Republican militia to fight against General Francisco Franco's forces. He was forward artillery observer and was seriously wounded on the Teruel Front in August 1937. Sent home to France to convalesce, Daura was given a medical discharge. Because he refused to return to Spain after the war, his Spanish citizenship (and Martha's) was revoked by the Franco government, which emerged victorious.

Louise became seriously ill, and in early July 1939 the family made an emergency medical trip to Virginia. She recovered, but World War II prevented their return to France. They established permanent residence in Virginia, and Pierre and Martha became naturalized U.S. citizens in 1943. Following the war, the family returned to their home in St. Cirq most summers.

Pierre Daura, "Fall at the McCorkle's Barn", c. 1942, oil painting on canvas board, 17.5 in x 23.63 in

Rockbridge Baths, Virginia is a small village in the foothills of the Allegheny Mountains, near Lexington, named after the warm springs once used as a spa there. Louise's mother gave her property there, including the springs, and the Dauras used a modest building on the land as a vacation home beginning with their first visit to Virginia in 1934–35. They also lived at the baths after they came to Virginia in July 1939 until early 1942, when they moved as caretakers to "Tuckaway", an historic property in Rockbridge County near Lexington. In the late summer of 1945 they moved to Lynchburg, Virginia, where Daura was chairman of the art department at Lynchburg College for the 1945–46 academic year. He also gave private lessons, instructing a young Cy Twombly in painting. He taught studio art at Randolph-Macon Woman's College from 1946 to 1953, then returned to painting and sculpture full-time.

In 1959, the Dauras built a contemporary house beside the springs at Rockbridge Baths where they lived the rest of their lives. Louise died November 10, 1972, and Pierre on January 1, 1976. They are both buried in the cemetery of Bethesda Presbyterian Church in Rockbridge Baths.

In the later years of his life, Daura said, "All I have ever wanted to do is to find a way to paint. I have painted. I have worked. I have given myself to my art. That is what I have wanted since my very early age... to be an artist, good or bad... that is what I am." His prolific output of works in many media attest to his lifelong commitment to his art.

Although the main body of Daura's work was strongly rooted in representation and the celebration of nature, he returned to abstract themes throughout his life. He is included in standard texts on Spanish and Catalan painting and in 33 Pintors Catalans (Barcelona, 1937, reissued 1976) by the art critic Joan Merli. Before the Spanish Civil War, Daura ambitiously pursued an artistic career. Subsequently, he created for his own satisfaction, fulfilled commissions, and sold works to support his family. He did not sell through commercial galleries after leaving Europe in 1939. Rather, he sold from his home or at exhibitions at academic venues and local art clubs. In the opinion of his daughter, Martha, traumatic experiences in the Spanish Civil War, followed by the tragedies of World War II, changed his outlook; personal fame ceased to be important. His work is now included in many private collections, primarily in Barcelona, France and Virginia. Major collections are also held by some forty-eight museums in France, Spain, and the United States. His papers, including letters to other Cercle et Carré artists such as Michel Seuphor are Joaquín Torres García, are in the Pierre Daura Center at the Georgia Museum of Art.

The medieval village where Daura passed so much of his life, St. Cirq-Lapopie, is a French historic monument, as is his former home. The Daura property was donated to the French Région Midi-Pyrenées in 2002, and is now used as an artists' colony, "Les Maisons Daura", administered by the Maison des arts Georges Pompidou.

== See also ==
- Cercle et Carré
