= Michel Seuphor =

Belgian painter

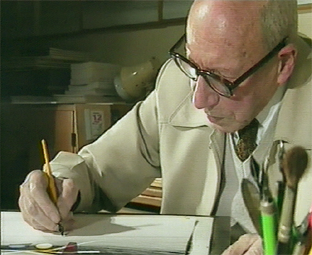
Michel Seuphor

Fernand Berckelaers (10 March 1901, in Borgerhout – 12 February 1999, in Paris), pseudonym Michel Seuphor (anagram of Orpheus), was a Belgian painter.

Seuphor established a literary magazine, Het Overzicht, in Antwerp in 1921. He moved in Dutch, Belgian, and French avant-garde circles. He associated at various points with Theo van Doesburg and Piet Mondrian, and was influenced by their iconic Neo-plasticist works. Along with Joaquin Torres-Garcia and Pierre Daura, Seuphor founded the abstract artists' group Cercle et Carré which included Wassily Kandinsky and Le Corbusier.

In 1934, Seuphor moved to Anduze in the South of France following his marriage.

Seuphor wrote and edited five books; A Dictionary of Abstract Painting (Tudor Publishing Co., 1958), Abstract Painting: 50 Years of Accomplishment (Dell Laurel Edition, 1964), "The Sculpture of this Century" (George Braziller, Inc. NY, 1960), "Piet Mondrian: Life and Work" (Thames & Hudson, 1956) and "Abstract Painting in Flanders (Fonds Mercator, 1974). These volumes, now out of print, remain among the most valuable documents of abstract painting & sculpture in the 20th century. The painting books have numerous color illustrations which document the various paths that abstract painting took, especially after World War II. The sculpture book has black & white photos that track both figurative as well as abstract sculpture from early 20th century through 1959. Also contains a short bio in the back of the book on each sculptor mentioned.

Seuphor also assisted with the Tudor companion volume of his Dictionary of Abstract Painting, the Dictionary of Modern Painting, which documents all the various schools of painting in the 20th century, including both abstract and realist painting. Seuphor contributed to many exhibition catalogues.

He also owned a contemporary art collection of works by Marcelle Cahn, Adam Jankowski, Jean Piaubert, Jean Gorin, Jean Miotte, Aurélie Nemours and Victor Vasarely.

== Sources ==
- Michel Seuphor information on Seuphor
- Michel Seuphor article on Seuphor
- Seuphor, Michel (1957). Dictionary of Abstract Painting.
- Seuphor, Michel (1956). Mondrian: Life and Work.
- Seuphor, Michel (1964). Abstract Painting: 50 Year of Accomplishment from Kandinsky to Jackson Pollock.
- Seuphor, Michel (1960). The Sculpture of this Century.
- Seuphor, Michel (1974). Abstract Painting in Flanders.
