= Carl Buchheister =

German constructivist artist

- Born: October 17, 1890
- Died: February 2, 1964 (aged 73)
- Known for: Painting
- Movement: Constructivism

Carl Buchheister (17 October 1890 – 2 February 1964) was a German constructivist artist noted for his multiple series of "model paintings" at Galerie Lambert Weyl, Paris. which he began in 1925.

He was born in Hanover, Germany. Although he was not officially part of the Bauhaus movement, Buchheister was a close friend of Wassily Kandinsky and paralleled many of the social and artistic goals of the Bauhaus school. With regard to constructivism, Buchheister was typically more playful and improvisational than his contemporaries, becoming interested in the Dada movement after a collaboration with Kurt Schwitters in the late 1920s which led him to incorporate more varied materials such as acrylic glass, aluminum, wood, and twine into his compositions. This direction was given much freer rein after World War II and the end of Nazism. He died in Hanover in 1964.

== Bibliography ==
- PONTUS HULTEN, LAMBERT WEYL, Constructivist Design. Edited by Galerie Lambert Weyl, Paris, 1958. Printed in Paris, 1958.

Carl Buchheister (1890–1964). Ausgewählte Schriften und Briefe. Herausgegeben mit einem Essay von Gerhard Charles Rump. Hildesheim: Gerstenberg, 1980. Buchheister, Elisabeth u. Willi Kemp.Carl Buchheister 1890–1964. Werkverzeichnis der abstrakten (und) gegenständlichen Arbeiten. 2 vols, Darmstadt u. Nürnberg 1984–86.

== See also ==
- List of German painters
