= Lourdes Gómez Franca =

Cuban-American painter & poet (1933–2017)

- Born: Lourdes Gómez Franca; February 15, 1933; Havana, Cuba
- Died: October 16, 2017 (aged 84); Miami, Florida, U.S.
- Education: Academia San Alejandro
- Known for: Painting, poetry
- Notable work: Poemas íntimos; Era una lágrima que amaba en silencio; The Thorns Are Green My Friend; El Niño De Guano
- Style: Expressionism, Surrealism, Fauvism
- Movement: Expressionism
- Mother: Josefina Gómez Franca
- Awards: Second Prize for Oil Painting, CINTAS Foundation (1966); Third Prize for Oil Painting, University of Miami Group Exhibition (1966); First Prize for Oil Painting, Arcadia Exhibition (1969)

Lourdes Gómez Franca (February 15, 1933 – October 16, 2017), better known simply as Lourdes, was a Cuban-American painter and poet who was active in Cuba and the United States. Her work was significant in Miami and Cuban art communities of the later Twentieth Century and covered by many critics and scholars.

== Life ==
=== Early years ===
Lourdes was born in Havana in 1933. Her family was well-established in Cuba and she was raised in Havana's wealthy Vedado neighborhood of stately homes. Her grandfather was Cuban leader Porfirio Franca (born 1878), a lawyer, banker, and economist who was a member of Cuba's Pentarchy of 1933.

Her early life, however, was marked by repeated tragedy that proved to be highly formative to her life and artistic career. Her mother, Josefina, was killed by thieves when Lourdes was 10 months old, causing her father to subsequently deteriorate mentally and physically as he suffered from depression, tuberculosis, and possibly schizophrenia. He was institutionalized when Lourdes was five, after which she and her older sister were raised by their grandparents. Their father died in 1946 when they were 13 and 14, respectively. Lourdes and her sister were both present in the hospital and witnessed his last words. Their grandfather then died in 1950.

Art proved to be a powerful outlet for Lourdes early on. She started painting as an untrained prodigy by the age of three, focusing mainly on religious themes such as the Madonna and Child for her first years. She was encouraged by teachers while attending the Escuela de Margot Parraga, the St. George's School, and the Merici Academy. She formally studied painting at the prestigious Academia San Alejandro at the age of 20. By the 1950s Havana newspapers and art critics were praising her impressionistic style. One of her non-religious painting series covered were domestic depictions of her grandfather's home, showing its high ceiling, marble floors, and curving grand staircase. She first became a known and respected artist in Cuba at this time, even championed by leading Cuban art figures such as Victor Manuel and Carlos Enriquez. By the end of the decade, however, her life would take several dramatic turns that resulted in major shifts in her career.

=== Paris period ===
Lourdes had achieved significant early success and recognition in her home country during its mid-century artistic flourishing. Despite this, she wanted to expand her audience and be known outside of Cuba, as well as learn new skills. She then went to Paris in 1957 at the age of 24 and spent several months there. Though spanning less than a year, this period proved to be a highly significant and pivotal point in her life and career.

She studied fine art directly under two leading masters of the time, learning painting from Andre Lhote and etching and engraving from Stanley Hayter. She was living in the Cite Universite and immersed in the mid-century Parisian art scene. It was also in this time when schizophrenia began to surface in Lourdes' life, a key development that greatly impacted much of her work thereafter. Though it was initially gradual, it became progressively worse until she experienced a sexual assault incident that precipitated a mental breakdown. She was then hospitalized shortly afterwards, her first in a series of mental health hospitalizations throughout her life. After her Paris hospitalization, Lourdes returned to Cuba accompanied by a psychiatrist and for a short time was able to find a new balance in her life. She would revisit her traumatic Paris period several times in later paintings and poems.

=== Miami period and later life ===
Following the events of the Cuban Revolution and Fidel Castro's rise to power, Lourdes relocated permanently to Miami in November 1960. She would remain there and continue to paint the rest of her life until her death in 2018. Over the course of her more than fifty-year career in the United States, she participated in several exhibitions of her paintings and published poetry collections in both Spanish and English. As in Cuba, Lourdes was a significant presence in the exile community in Miami but often struggled to expand her audience beyond it into a broader mainstream. This was partly due to the crippling impact of her mental health on her career when it came to sustaining high-profile events such as book launches and major art exhibitions, which would remain a constant regret for the remainder of her life. Despite this, she befriended several prominent figures in the South Florida art market who would become important contacts for her throughout the enduring Miami period of her career.

Chief among these contacts was Coral Gables, Florida-based Cuban fine art patron, dealer, and collector Marta Permuy. Their relationship was a significant aspect of Lourdes' US career as she became a key figure in the Permuy Gallery during the 1970s as well as Permuy's subsequent art salon social circles in the decades following. Lourdes painted portraits of the Permuy family and Permuy was a frequent dealer of her artwork for much of her career. Lourdes would often use her private Coral Gables residence, the Permuy House, as a studio to paint. The two remained close friends with Lourdes referring to Permuy as "mi hermana" ("my sister") in portraits; the two ultimately died within months of each other. Permuy also introduced Lourdes to leading Latin American art collectors Marcos and Josefina Pinedo, who would also become major collectors of her work. Another prominent art dealer and promoter of Lourdes' artwork was Coconut Grove-based Barbara Greene. Greene represented her for ten years from 1993 to Greene's death in 2003. She became an emphatic supporter of Lourdes after seeing one of her paintings of a cathedral over a fireplace at the home of artist Pablo Cano. She was active in the period of Gomez Franca's career that included the launch of her last poetry collection, El Niño De Guano.

Lourdes also developed a special relationship with some of her physicians, especially her psychiatrist Dr. Gaston S. Magrinat, who encouraged her career in Havana before her exile and continued to collect her art after both moved to Miami. The Magrinat family (now residing in North Carolina) preserves a substantial number of Lourdes’s works (42) ranging from powerful religious images, interiors and Cuban landscapes in oil, to water colors and ceramics.

Other significant friends and oprofessional contacts included fellow Cuban exile artists Dionisio Perkins and Miguel Jorge. The three would often attend art and social events as a trio and had supported as well as influenced each other's work and careers. Lourdes and Perkins had known each other from their youth in Cuba while Jorge later lived in close proximity to the Permuy Gallery in Coral Gables and introduced Lourdes to the Permuys. Jorge, who died in 1984, wrote the artist statement used for Lourdes' 1981 solo exhibition in Coral Gables. Pablo Cano also became a key friend and artistic collaborator. In addition to introducing Greene to Lourdes, the two worked together on her last two poetry collections published in her lifetime. Cano, thirty years her junior and now better known for his sculptural work, provided the illustrations to each poem in a style that was strongly reminiscent of Lourdes' own, reflecting her influence on him as a mentor.

== Style ==
Stylistically, Lourdes is known for her vivid use of color, heavy impasto, and flowing, childlike Expressionistic imagery. She displayed a deliberate lack of realism with her distinct expressionism that occasionally incorporated aspects of Surrealism and Fauvism, such as curving and floating objects, vivid and unnatural use of color, disproportionate size, and so on. Specifically, Lourdes' work has been compared to the works of European artists in these movements, namely Georges Rouault, Henri Matisse, and Max Beckmann, as well as prominent Cuban contemporaries of hers such as Victor Manuel and René Portocarrero. She also frequently used symbolism, such as in her color and stylistic choices (e.g. painting individuals blue during their "blue periods") to express more in layers. Cuban art historian Lynette Bosch described Lourdes as "a strong painter" who used high color contrast as signature feature, creating an "emotional chiaroscuro" effect. Her subject matter ranged from interpretive portraits of friends to lush landscapes, often rural and tropical, and seasides recalling both scenes of her childhood in Cuba as well as new found inspiration from life in Miami. Her Cuba-inspired work was often a nostalgic look back to Cuba as a Paradise Lost that resonated deeply with both the Cuban exile community as well as those who had never been to Cuba since the decades-long embargo, enhancing its mystique. Other common themes and series include still lifes (such as flowers and fruit), animals associated with Cuba (e.g. roosters and fish), and spiritual imagery, such as angels and the Virgin Mary. She left many of her works untitled and undated, letting them speak for themselves in her typically pure and straightforward manner; when titles are given, they are likewise simple, unpretentious, and directly descriptive. She usually signed her paintings simply with "Lourdes" (as she was known by most) and on occasion would leave preliminary sketches on the backside of her canvases, offering a playful glimpse into her creative process.

Many of her works are introspective and psychological, showing unique glimpses into her perspective as a female immigrant as well as her life-long struggle with mental illness. As such, she captured the world as she saw and experienced it. Her paintings often reflected her immediate moods in the moment they were painted, serving as snapshots of her frame of mind in that general period. As such, those works painted in darker periods of her life were often departures of her "classic" style, instead using darker colors and more muddied composition.

== Gallery ==
Paintings by Lourdes Gomez Franca

== Selected works ==
Poetry collections

- Poemas íntimos (1964), A.C.A.P.E. Publishers
- Era una lagrima que amaba en silencio (1975), AIP Publishers, self illustrated
- The Thorns Are Green My Friend (1989), published by Ediciones Universal, illustrated by Pablo Cano
- El Niño De Guano (1993), published by Ediciones Universal, illustrated by Pablo Cano

== Selected solo exhibitions ==
- 1957: Lyceum, Havana, Cuba
- 1960: Lyceum, Havana, Cuba
- 1971: American Art Institute, Miami, Florida
- 1976: Bacardi Gallery, Miami, Florida
- 1981: "Lourdes Gomez Franca." Interamericas Art Gallery, Coral Gables, Florida
- 1987: Camilo Muebles Exhibition, Coral Gables, Florida
- 1991: "Un Sol Cubano," Pablo Cano Studio, Miami, Florida

== Reputation and legacy ==
Gomez Franca's work attracted media and critical attention throughout her over sixty-year career. She won several awards, including Second Prize for oil Painting from the CINTAS Foundation in 1966, Third Prize for oil painting during the 1966 University of Miami Group Exhibition, and First Prize for oil painting in the 1969 Arcadia Exhibition. Her career was covered extensively by media in both Cuba and the United States, conducted several interviews, and was profiled by El Nuevo Herald (including "Lourdes Gomez Franca – Imagenes Tortuadas"; June 27, 1988 and "Lourdes Gomez Franca: De La Furia A La Calma Una Tragica Historia Personal"; June 10, 1990) and The Palm Beach Post ("An Artist and Her Demon"; July 18, 1993 – redistributed on the San Francisco Chronicle, August 15, 1993).

Lourdes has been praised by leading scholars in Cuban art. Prominent Cuban art critic and Smithsonian Institution affiliate Giulio V. Blanc, who famously coined the term "the Miami Generation," called her "The most underrated artist in Miami" in Arts Magazine. He also wrote the foreword for her 1989 book The Thorns Are Green My Friend, a poetry collection written primarily during one of her hospitalizations. In it, he said of Victor Manuel and Enriquez "That these two notoriously acerbic and difficult men should have found something to praise in Lourdes is telling." He also went on to describe Gomez Franca as "an undiscovered Treasure of Miami."

She has also been discussed in several books by noted Cuban art historians, such as Cuban-American Literature and Art: Negotiating Identities (by Isabel Alvarez Borland and Lynette M. F. Bosch, 2009), Cuban-American Art in Miami: Exile, Identity and the Neo-Baroque (Lynette M. F. Bosch, 2004), Memoria : Cuban art of the 20th century (by José Veigas, Cristina Vives, Adolfo V Nodal, Valia Garzón, and Dannys Montes de Oca; 2009) and Paradise Lost or Gained: The Literature of Hispanic Exile (by Fernando Alegria and Jorge Ruffinelli, 1990). Lourdes was also featured on the 1993 Art Now Gallery Guide: National & international (Volume 12, Issues 7-8) and 1990 edition of Arts Magazine (Volume 65, Issues 1-4).

Her work is included in the University of Miami's Lowe Art Museum as well as several prominent collections of Cuban art, including the Permuy and Pinedo collections.
