= Miguel Jorge =

Cuban-American artist (1928-1984)

- Born: 1928; Havana, Cuba
- Died: 1984 (aged 55–56); Coral Gables, Florida
- Other names: Mickey Jorge, Miky Jorge, Miqui Jorge
- Education: University of Havana, Harvard Graduate School of Design,
- Occupation: Visual artist
- Years active: 1950s - 1984
- Notable work: Profeta (Prophet) series
- Movement: La Vieja Guardia, Cuban diaspora art

Miguel Jorge (1928–1984), also known as “Micky” Jorge, was a Cuban artist who was influential in the establishment of South Florida's early Latin American art market in the Greater Miami area from the 1960s through the 1980s.

== Life and career ==
=== Early life ===
Miguel Jorge was born in Havana, Cuba in 1928. He displayed a high degree of intellect and an interest in art and design early in life, leading Jorge to pursue extensive academic studies in fine art and architecture. He studied architecture in the University of Havana, where he also took courses in color dynamics under Josef Albers of Yale, a mentor of his. During his upbringing and studies in Cuba he became strongly influenced by the art of Amelia Peláez, one of the leaders of Cuba's Vanguardia movement. In 1953 he enrolled in the Harvard Graduate School of Design where he studied under famed Bauhaus modernist architect Walter Gropius. He gained early recognition in the arts for his exhibitions in Havana's prestigious Lyceum in the 1950s and had become close to the prominent Gómez-Mena family of Spaniard nobility and Cuban aristocracy by way of the Cuban sugar industry. They would become early supporters and patrons of his work and financed many of his trips to Europe and particularly Spain where they had property and strong ties. Among them were the Countess of Revilla de Camargo María Luisa Gómez-Mena the elder and her niece the leading Cuban art patron María Luisa Gómez-Mena the younger. The family was also tied by the marriage of José Gómez-Mena to other Cuban sugar barons such as the Fanjul family. Through the Gómez-Mena family Jorge was connected to other prominent collectors such as the Duchess of Alba. With the support of the Gómez-Mena family Jorge furthered his own personal studies in the arts with frequent visits to Paris, Madrid, Rome, and New York City. Despite this early success in the arts, architecture would be Jorge's main career until achieving broader artistic recognition in the United States during the 1970s.

Following Fidel Castro’s rise to power in the Cuban Revolution, Jorge emigrated to first to Spain where he studied art in the Madrid School of Bellas Artes. In 1963 he returned to the United States. Throughout much of the 1960s he lived in New York where he studied at the Parsons School of Design. In 1968 he joined his mother in Miami, Florida and became part of the Cuban diaspora community in exile there. Jorge would subsequently work as a senior draftsman in architecture firms based in South Florida.

Architecture would be an important influence on his art and connected him to several key figures of Miami’s early Latin art community, including Jesús Permuy, Baruj Salinas, and Rafael Consuegra, each of whom shared architecture backgrounds.

=== Miami art career ===
Jorge continued to paint avidly while in his architecture career in Miami, though he sought to transition into a greater focus on his art. A major challenge to Cuban exile artists in the 1960s and 1970s was the lack of institutional support for Latin American artists. During this early period, two groups of established artists would come to shape the emerging Latin American Art market of South Florida. The first was the Grupo GALA (Grupo de Artistas Latinoamericanos), the first professional association of Latin artists in South Florida, whose membership was made up of the artists Baruj Salinas, Enrique Riverón, Rosana McAllister, Rafael Soriano, José Mijares, and Osvaldo Gutiérrez. GALA was noted for its prominent members and highly disciplined approach with regular meetings, scheduled group exhibitions, and official catalogs.

The second group was the trio of Miguel Jorge, Lourdes Gomez Franca, and Dionisio (“Denis”) Perkins. Their group was considered more informal and eccentric though also a significant force in Miami's early art scene with each going on to win awards and critical recognition. The three formed a close friendship that extended back to Cuba and would influenced each of their careers as well as those of younger generations of artists that followed this period in establishing the modern Miami art market, now dominated by Cuban and Latin American art. The three would influence their respective styles, assist each other professionally, and often attend social events as a group. Extended members of this group included the artists Gabriel Sorzano and Margarita Cano.

=== Recognition and death ===
Jorge was a neighbor of famed Cuban artist Juan González while they resided within the main business and cultural hub of Coral Gables, Florida during the late 1960s and early 1970s. Following González's pivotal move to New York City where he would go on to achieve international success, González's former apartment in 1901 Le Jeune Road would be converted into the Permuy Gallery, among the first Cuban fine art galleries in the United States. The gallery would become a significant cultural nexus that contributed to the establishment of Miami's modern art market.

Due to Jorge's close proximity to the gallery as its neighboring unit, as well as his architecture background, Jorge became close to the gallery's owners, architect and community leader Jesús Permuy, and his first wife, Coral Gables art dealer and patron Marta Permuy. This led to Jorge, Gomez Franca, and Perkins quickly becoming frequent fixtures of the Permuys' popular “Fridays” event series of weekly exhibition openings followed by evening salon gatherings. The three would also be represented by Marta Permuy, the gallery's general manager, and exhibited there regularly in the 1970s. As their visibility increased, Jorge further immersed himself in the gallery's growing network and social orbit, which included business, cultural, and political figures in the greater South Florida area. One prominent member of this network that became a major collector of Jorge's work was Cuban and Latin American art collector Marcos F. Pinedo and his wife Josefina Camacho Pinedo. To reflect Jorge's close association with this early Latin art network, he created an original artwork to serve as a uniquely recognizable sign to be displayed whenever the gallery was closed. Jorge would go on to have a pivotal solo exhibition there in 1973 titled Miguel Jorge: One Man Show that led to a subsequent solo exhibition the following year at the Bacardi Gallery, owned by the multinational Bacardi Corporation, which exposed Jorge to a national audience.

Over the ensuing decade Jorge would build on this exposure with increased media interviews, public engagements, and exhibitions in numerous locations throughout South Florida (Coral Gables, Miami, Coconut Grove), Detroit, and Spain (Madrid, Málaga) and remained close with Gomez Franca and Perkins, maintaining weekly meetings. A year after his Bacardi exhibition Jorge appeared on Enfoque, a popular Spanish-language television program, where he was interviewed to discuss his views on contemporary art. The program aired on September 28, 1975 and was covered by the Miami Herald. Through the 1970s he had also been commissioned to paint several public art murals in South Florida and in Europe. In 1976, another key period of Jorge's career, he painted a series of three murals for the Nova Club of Miami which were unveiled with an extensive exhibition of his work. The exhibition featured over 30 paintings, including several from his Profeta (Prophet) series. That same year, Jorge was commissioned to design the event logo for the inaugural Re-Encuentro Cubano exhibition series, held in June, which would run annually until 1980. Jorge was also a featured artist in the exhibition, which was held that June. In July, Jorge organized an exhibition in the office of Coral Gables architecture firm Brown Lopez Brown. The show was one of the first exhibitions focusing on emerging young Cuban and Latin American artists in South Florida. Several of the featured artists would later be featured in 1983's The Miami Generation exhibition and become notable Cuban artists in the United States, such as Emilio Falero, Humberto Calzada, and Pablo Cano. The exhibition was Cano's first career exhibition.

On February 2, 1977 he gave a high-profile lecture on the art of Amelia Peláez, a major influence of his, and the Cubist movement sponsored by the Miami-Dade Public Library System. In October of that year he also organized and led the illustrated conference "Jose Miguel Rodriguez: A Caribbean Painter in the Middle of Castille" in Miami. In 1978 Jorge was one of the featured artists included in the Lowe Art Museum's first traveling exhibition, which included a showing in the Museum of Modern Art of Latin America in Washington D.C. In the early 1980s Jorge was one of the central figures in organizing the landmark Miami Generation exhibitions, the first major exhibition dedicated exclusively on the generation of Cuban exile artists that were educated in South Florida and not by Cuban art institutions such as the Academia San Alejandro. This furthered his influence and impact on younger generations of Cuban and Latin American artists such as Humberto Calzada, who Jorge mentored.

Even as his artistic recognition increased, Jorge continued to struggle with his mental health and suffered from Manic depressive disorder. He died of suicide in 1984 at the age of 56 in Miami, Florida.

== Style ==
Miguel Jorge's artwork reflected his personality, which ranged from mercurial, sensitive, witty, acerbic, and self-critical. Jorge's art utilized intricate, eccentric, and unpredictable geometric patterns informed by architecture that often incorporated ambiguous images, hidden images, angles and fragmenting effects. In addition to architecture, Jorge also drew influence from the art of Amelia Peláez as well as Cubist approaches and themes rooted in psychological introspection, spirituality, and his Cuban cultural heritage. His subjects included the Madonna and child, Cuban tropical scenes, other figurative works such as still lifes and faces, as well as other works approaching total abstraction.

Like his close associates Lourdes Gomez Franca and Dionisio Perkins, Jorge - the oldest of the three - is considered part of the modernist Vieja Guardia of Cuban Art that followed the Vanguardia movement. Showing the influence of architecture, Jorge often used color to highlight and draw contrast to form, figures, and patterns in order to keep these elements at the forefront. Jorge often utilized tropical flourishes that meshed the rigidity of geometric and mechanized elements with flowing and branch-like organic embellishments, such leaves. When he applied this approach to subjects such as faces, as in his Profeta (“Prophet”) series, it would create surrealistic effects informed by his psychological and intellectual approach. Cuban art scholar and former Director of the Museum of Modern Art of Latin America Jose Gomez-Sicre wrote the introduction for Jorge's work exhibited in the Lowe Museum's 1978 traveling exhibition and described Jorge' style as “gliding from melodious curves to cutting edges [...] mixing and forming shapes to make baroque tangles with insinuations of vines or wicker.”

Jorge's mediums included watercolor, acrylic paint, pastels, marker, pencil, and oil paintings on either canvas or paper. Jorge typically signed his works with an addition sign (+) followed by Miguel Jorge, Micky Jorge, or MJ.

== Reputation and legacy ==
Miguel Jorge's career has been discussed in published literature of Cuban, Latin American, and American art, including the books Cuban-American Art in Miami: Exile, Identity and the Neo-Baroque and The Cuban-American Experience: Culture, Images, and Perspectives, Memoria: Cuban Art of the 20th Century as well as media and literary publications such as The Miami Herald, The Miami Times, the American Library Association’s Choice, Gables Living Magazine, and Latin American art journal Resumen.

Jorge exhibited extensively in both individual and group showings throughout Cuba, Spain, and the United States. In 1981 Jorge won the Central National Bank of Miami Award at the Metropolitan Museum of Fine Art. He is credited as founding member Miami’s Latin American art market and became closely associated with other leading participants, including the Grupo GALA, Juan González, the Permuys, and particularly Dionisio Perkins and Lourdes Gomez Franca. In his final years Jorge helped spearhead the landmark "Miami Generation" exhibitions to spotlight and support the first generation of Cuban exile artists that were educated in South Florida and the United States. His work with Gomez Franca and Perkins would also influence younger generations of Miami artists, such as the “Miami Generation” of the 1980s. Notable examples include Humberto Calzada, who Jorge mentored, and Pablo Cano, who would eventually collaborate extensively with Gomez Franca beginning in the 1980s and 1990s.

The year following his death, the Cuban Museum of Arts and Culture held a tribute exhibition of Jorge's work in recognition of his life and career in the arts. The exhibition was held from January 24 - February 24 of 1985 and featured painted works from his Profeta series, ceramics, and Jorge’s portrait series of notable figures in his circle including: Dennis Perkins, Lourdes Gomez Franca, Marta Permuy, Juan Gonzalez, Jose Mijares, Baruj Salinas, Humberto Calzada, Rafael Consuegra, art critic Lillian Dobbs, as well as Cuban socialite and Vanguardia patron Maria Luisa Gomez Mena. Works were also loaned to the exhibition from the private collections of Margarita and Pablo Cano, the Jorge family, and other collectors of Jorge’s works.

Gomez Franca dedicated her 1989 poetry collection The Thorns are Green My Friend to Jorge after his death.

Due to his cultural significance to South Florida and the Cuban diaspora, the University of Miami maintains records of Jorge's career in the Artist Files of its Cuban Heritage Collection. Jorge's artwork is featured in several prominent collections of Latin American Art, including the Lowe Art Museum as well as the Permuy and Pinedo Collections.
