= Marta Permuy =

Cuban-American art patron and collector

- Born: Marta Teresita Cazañas y Díaz; September 22, 1938; Havana, Cuba
- Died: October 4, 2017 (aged 79); Coral Gables, Florida, U.S.
- Occupations: Art patron; art collector; curator; art dealer
- Spouse: Jesús Permuy (m. 1962; div. 1981)
- Parent(s): Pedro Pablo Cazañas; Raquel M. Diaz Teresa

Marta Cazañas Permuy (September 22, 1938 – October 4, 2017) was a Cuban-American fine art patron, art collector, curator, art dealer, and promoter based in Coral Gables, Florida. She was an influential figure in the establishment of the Latin American art market of South Florida. She managed and co-founded Permuy Gallery, one of the first venues dedicated to Cuban art in the United States. She also hosted a long-running art salon where South Florida art, literary, business, and political figures would gather to discuss art and culture.

== Early life ==
=== Background and upbringing ===
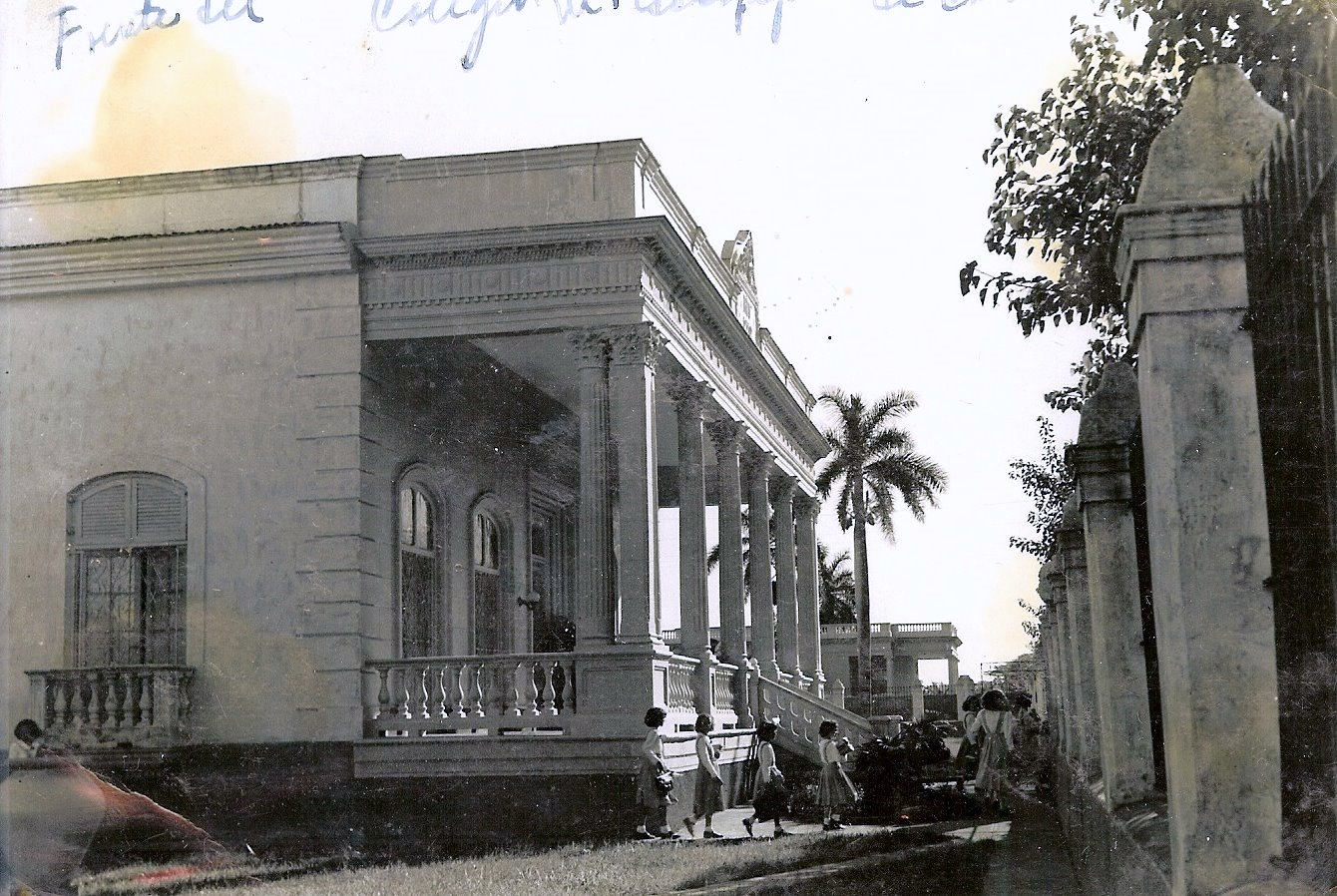
The Madres Escolapias School of Cárdenas, where Marta Permuy was a student, as photographed in 1957.

Marta Teresita Cazañas y Díaz was born on September 22, 1938, in Havana, the second child of Cuban judge Pedro Pablo Cazañas and his wife, Raquel María Díaz y Teresa. Her parents were of prominent Matanzas-area families. Marta and her siblings, Raquel and Eduardo, would be raised on the Cazañas family's Buena Vista estate in Cárdenas bordering Varadero.

She and her older sister Raquel attended the Las Madres Escolapias de Cárdenas Catholic school. Upon graduating they enrolled in the University of Havana studying law and chemistry, respectively. In her early years as a young adult in Cuba, Marta also first encountered Cuban art through paintings and folk art. These encounters developed the early interests of what would eventually become her primary career during her life in exile.

== Cuban Revolution ==
With the outbreak of the Cuban Revolution and the growing alignment of the Castro regime with Soviet-backed Communist doctrines, Marta became involved with the pro-democracy Counterrevolution. She became highly active within the MRR (the Movement to Recuperate the Revolution, or Movement for Revolutionary Recovery), a leading faction of the broader Castro resistance that was made up of a coalition of University of Havana students, high-level defectors of the Castro government, as well as members of the influential Christian professional organization the Agrupación Católica Universitaria (ACU).

As her involvement with the MRR deepened, Marta became among the few women given central roles in the organization's leadership and would also recruit other key operatives. As such, Marta's older sister Raquel and her husband, prominent psychiatrist and pro-democracy revolutionary René de la Huerta, also became involved. De la Huerta, a top member of the ACU, had previously been involved in efforts to oust Fulgencio Batista with Jorge Agostini and other anti-Batista figures. They would play an increasing influential role in the organization during the lead-up to the Bay of Pigs invasion and planning. In 1960 De La Huerta became Secretary of Intelligence of the MRR and Marta would often stay in his El Vedado residence with her sister during her MRR missions while the home served as an important covert MRR leadership base.

Through these activities Marta met Jesús Permuy, then the MRR's Secretary of Security. Marta would be assigned to aid him in his missions as his right-hand through his various roles, which included his elevation to Civil Coordinator and finally National Coordinator of the MRR. Marta's activities included organizing meetings, hiding contacts, and coordinating between MRR cells with aliases to avoid detection by Castro and Soviet counter-intelligence agents and infiltrators.

With the failure of the Bay of Pigs invasion in April 1961 and Castro's subsequent waves of opposition crackdowns, arrests, and executions, it became evident to many in the resistance that there was little chance of success in toppling the Castro regime or securing democratic protections. Marta and Jesús then used diplomatic contacts to escape for Venezuela in 1962 by way of Cuba's Venezuelan embassy. They remained in Venezuela for several months before relocating to the United States later that year to join the Cuban diaspora community there in exile.

=== Move to the United States ===
Marta and Jesús married in 1962 soon after resettling in Miami, Florida. They later relocated to Washington D.C. in 1966 where Jesús Permuy received his Master in Regional and City Planning (MRCP) from the Catholic University of America and served as chief planner for Anne Arundel County. The Permuy family then returned permanently to South Florida in 1969 when Jesús Permuy was appointed Planning Supervisor for the Dade County Department of Housing and Urban Development (HUD).

== The Permuy Gallery ==
By the early 1970s the Permuys had become active in the early Cuban art community of South Florida. Their initial involvement came through Jesús Permuy's previous relationships with artists in Cuba such as José Mijares and Amelia Peláez, as well and through his professional work as several Cuban artists also worked in or studied architecture, including Baruj Salinas, Miguel Jorge, and Rafael Consuegra. Another important cultural circuit was his involvement in the ACU, which had now relocated to Miami and included several artists, architects, and business leaders. Throughout the 1960s the Cuban arts community in exile struggled with a multitude of issues including a lack of institutional venues to showcase Cuban art, as well as a lack of disposable income among collectors to buy artworks at prices that would support a sustained Cuban and Latin American art market.

In 1969 the Permuys were introduced to Juan González by Baruj Salinas. Shortly after, González, then a graduate fine arts student in the University of Miami, became close to Marta who, in turn, became an early supporter of his art career. By 1971 she helped secure him a studio space in a Coral Gables apartment at 1901 Le Jeune Road where he produced many of the works that led to his career breakthrough. In 1972 González graduated from the University of Miami and was preparing to relocate to New York City after successful exhibitions in the Whitney Museum and Allan Stone Gallery. As a result of his need to move, the Permuys then made arrangements with González to assume the lease to his art studio and subsequently convert it into a fine art gallery dedicated to Cuban art, becoming one of the first in the United States. The venue was in close proximity to Miracle Mile, the prominent center of downtown Coral Gables, and therefore easily accessible to visitors. González remained close to Marta after his move to New York and participated in collective exhibitions at Permuy Gallery. The gallery neighbored the apartment of Cuban artist Miguel Jorge, who was close to fellow Cuban artists Lourdes Gomez Franca and Dionisio Perkins, and introduced them to the Permuys. The three formed an influential group of artists in South Florida who were highly active within the Permuy Gallery's sphere. Once the gallery had opened, Marta became its manager and oversaw its operations, organized its events, and curated its exhibitions. As such, the gallery became closely associated with her and she developed long-running relationships with its affiliated artists and collectors. Though run as a standard fine art gallery, Permuy Gallery also became noticed for its departures from the standards of American fine art galleries. While it featured traditional white walls, it also infused a number of unconventional influences such as tropical indoor plants and thick residential window drapes. Permuy Gallery was also structured in weekly rather than monthly exhibition rotations to allow for continual change in the artworks as well as for more artists to be featured.

The main events associated with Permuy Gallery were its Friday Gallery Nights (referred to in Spanish as “los viernes”). These entailed wine-and-cheese exhibition openings to unveil the coming week's exhibition setup. In the evenings these would evolve into the Permuys’ art salon gatherings that would gather leaders and noted figures from the broader South Florida community to discuss art, literature, spirituality, politics, and other subjects in a setting that facilitated networking and well as intellectual stimulation. This was a significant way for many artists to meet future collectors and become known by other segments of the community that were largely uninvolved with the arts. It was also an important cultural meeting point within the Cuban exile community in Miami and the surrounding cities. Another aspect of the gallery's culture was the creation of original art directly linked to the site itself. These include an artwork created by Jorge that would serve as the gallery's "Closed" sign as well as an Expressionist portrait of Marta Permuy painted by Gomez Franca at the gallery.

In its approximately five-year span, Permuy Gallery featured many prominent as well as emerging Cuban and Latin American artists in individual and group exhibitions. Featured artists included the trio of Lourdes Gomez Franca, Miguel (“Mickey”) Jorge, Dionisio (“Dennis”) Perkins as well as Juan González, Rafael Consuegra, Emilio Falero, Margarita Cano, and Gabriel Sorzano. Another important group of artists that frequently exhibited in the gallery and participated in its Fridays was the Grupo GALA (GALA Group), the first formal professional organization of exhibiting Latin artists in South Florida. GALA, an acronym for Grupo de Artistas Latino Americanos (Group of Latin American Artists) was made up of the six artists Baruj Salinas, Enrique Riverón, Rosana McAllister, José Mijares, Rafael Soriano, and Osvaldo Gutierrez, most of whom were already well-established in Cuba. McAllister was the only woman as well as the only non-Cuban of the group, being from Argentina and of Irish ancestry. She would become another long-term associate of Marta Permuy who Permuy would frequently represent outside the gallery.

Another significant group of Cuban artists featured in the gallery were the famed Cuban Vanguardia artists, including Víctor Manuel, René Portocarrero, Amelia Peláez, Wifredo Lam and later prominent modernists outside Miami such as Cundo Bermudez. Though most of the Vanguardia artists either died or remained in Cuba after the Cuban Revolution, many prominent Cuban art collectors brought their works from Cuba to the United States and would sell them through the gallery by way of its consignment services. The work of these high-profile legacy artists would be a significant draw to collectors who in this period were seeking to re-establish links to their cultural heritage as it became clear over time that a return to Cuba would not be viable while the Cuban government was well-entrenched.

Notable participants in Marta's activities in Permuy Gallery included then-Miami mayor Maurice Ferre, Cuban art critic and poet Mauricio Fernández, future curator and scholar Ricardo Pau-Llosa, as well as Latin American art collector and patron Marcos Pinedo and his future wife Josefina Camacho. While the Permuy Gallery was noteworthy as a historic venture early in the establishment of Latin American art in South Florida, by the end of its run there would be other Cuban and Latin American focused art galleries that began to emerge. By the late 1970s and early 1980s a thriving gallery scene of several Cuban art galleries was established around the hub of Coral Gables and other growing pockets in the region which had allowed for a viable and sustained Latin American art market to flourish in South Florida in the ensuing decades.

During the Permuy Gallery period the Permuys were also involved in other ventures in design and community development that were connected to their network at the gallery. In 1973 they launched the firm Permuy & Associates Inc. which would be one of Jesús Permuy's main private sector architecture, urban planning, development and consulting practices. Marta served as the firm's first Vice President while its attorney and registered agent was prominent art collector and future Coral Gables Mayor Raul Valdes-Fauli.

== The Permuy House ==
In 1976 the Permuys purchased a historic Mediterranean Revival-styled residence in Coral Gables. Built adjacent to the Biltmore Hotel and Golf Course during the early Merrick era of the city's founding, the property was noted for being designed by Alfred F. Schimek and featuring an extension by Alfred Browning Parker. The home would come to be known as the Permuy House for its association with Marta Permuy's art activities there.

The late 1970s and early 1980s marked a tumultuous period in Permuy's life. By 1977 Permuy Gallery had closed while the family relocated to the Permuy House and Marta prioritized raising her children. In 1978 her father, Pedro Pablo Cazañas, died in Miami. In 1981 Jesús and Marta would divorce.

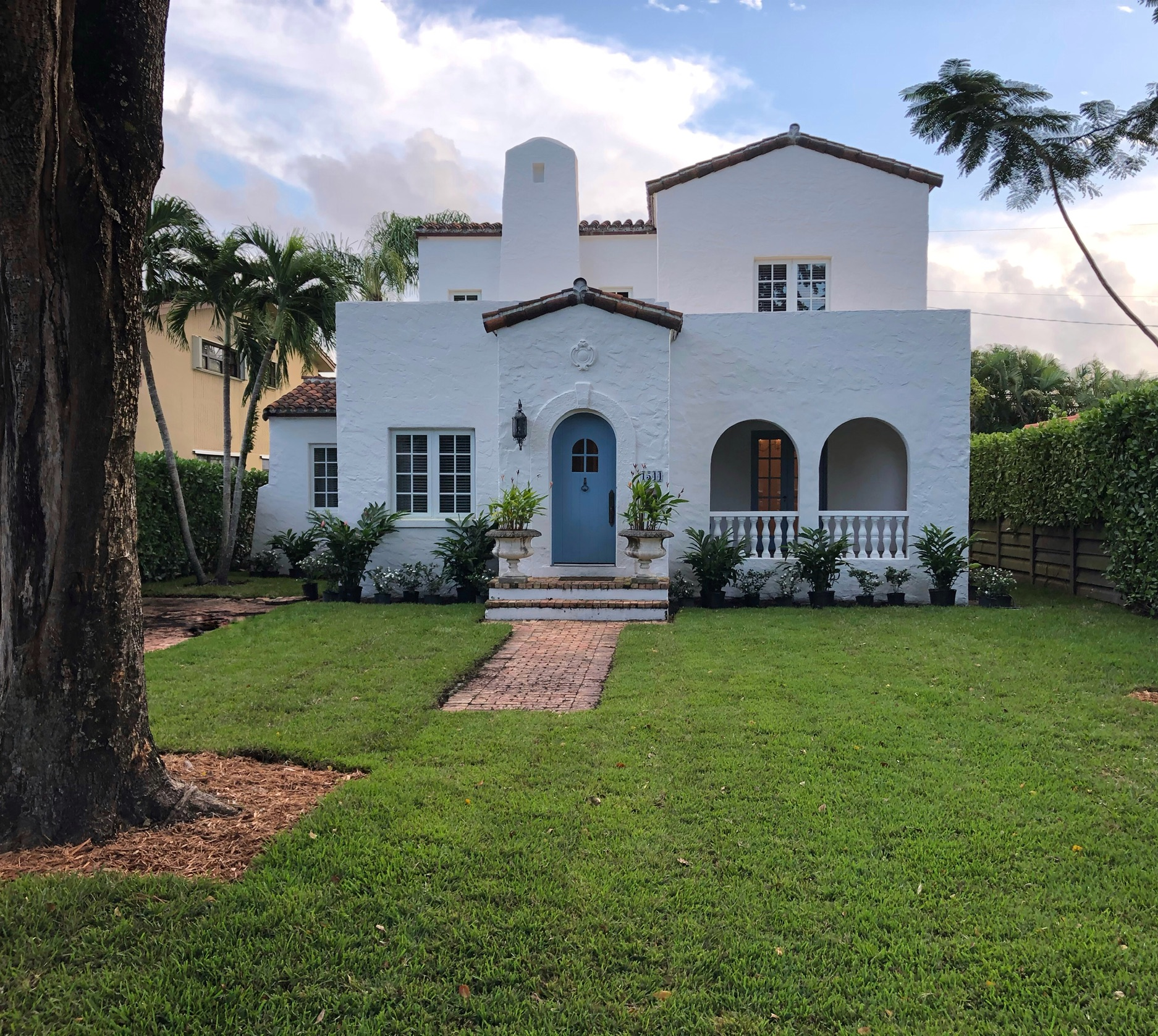
The Permuy House, the main venue of Marta Permuy's later art events and a landmark of Coral Gables, Florida, as seen in 2020.

Through the 1980s Marta fully relaunched her art career, now using the Permuy House as her base of activities. She would continue hosting her long-running salon gatherings, hold events and private art exhibitions, and maintain a schedule of regular weekly social gatherings with artists, such as Perkins and Mijares, and collectors. Permuy would also represent several of the artists featured in Permuy Gallery, such as Lourdes Gomez Franca, Perkins, and McAllister, as well as support new artists. Her activities at the Permuy House were cited as a key locale for the arts in Miami in the book Cuban-American Art in Miami: Exile, Identity and the Neo-Baroque.

She was also an influential advisor to Marcos Pinedo, helping him build the prestigious Pinedo Collection. Pinedo and his now-wife Josefina had their first date at Permuy Gallery in August 1973, where Pinedo first met Permuy and she began connecting him to her network of artists. With Permuy's guidance Pinedo became a leading South Florida art collector in the 1980s and 1990s as well as a patron of the arts supporting institutions such as the Museum of Art Fort Lauderdale and Florida National University.

Through her later years, Permuy continued to support marginalized, established, as well as emerging artists from the Permuy House as well as events throughout South Florida. Artists Permuy supported in her later years included Neith Nevelson, Ramon Unzueta, Carlos Navarro, Josevelio Rodriguez, and Carlos Acostaneyra. The home was designated a Coral Gables landmark in 2021 for its cultural-historical significance.

== Death and legacy ==
Marta Permuy died on October 4, 2017, in Coral Gables. Her memorial mass, held in Coral Gables’ Church of the Little Flower, included several high-profile South Florida art and community figures, including Emilio Falero, Marcos and Josefina Pinedo. The ceremony was presided by Guillermo García-Tuñón S.J, President of Belen Jesuit and a Director of the Agrupación Católica Universitaria, and her eulogy was delivered by her son Pedro Pablo Permuy.

Following her death, Permuy's impact on South Florida art and Cuban exile art had been recognized by several prominent individuals and organizations. In 2017, longtime South Florida Congresswoman Ileana Ros-Lehtinen (FL-27) released a statement across her social media platforms stating that Permuy “bravely fought Castro and was a key figure in Miami Cuban Art” in reference to her work in the Castro resistance during the Cuban Revolution as well as her career in the arts in South Florida. The following year Cuban art scholar and historian Lynette Bosch stated “That early art world could not have happened without them (Marta and Jesús Permuy).”

In addition to her institutional role as an early Latin American art gallerist and art dealer, Permuy was distinct for her humanistic patronage philosophy and practices. This included supporting struggling and emerging artists by offering them rooms in the Permuy House as space to paint when they did not have access to art studios, as well as lowering or waiving her commission fees from art sales in order to give maximal proceeds to artists. In her book Cuban-American Art in Miami, Bosch wrote “Permuy's home provided a place of refuge where they could find an intellectual climate that eased their emotional, psychological and cultural thirst.” In 2020 Marcos Pinedo, owner of the Pinedo Collection, stated “Marta was an amazing and very intelligent, knowledgeable person. She […] always helped others however she could.” The Permuy Gallery's Friday gallery nights have been credited with setting the original precedent for the ongoing Gables Gallery Night tradition in the city (now held on the first Friday of each month), as well as for helping to initiate Coral Gables' rise as a major hub of Latin American art galleries in the United States by the 1980s.

Beginning in 2018, a year following her death, the Coral Gables-based firm Permuy Architecture, led by Marta's eldest son Ignacio Permuy, began hosting annual “Art + Architecture” exhibitions in honor of the legacy of Permuy Gallery and its impact on the arts of South Florida. These exhibitions have featured works by several prominent Permuy Gallery-affiliated artists Marta remained close to, including Rafael Consuegra, Falero, Baruj Salinas, and Jose Mijares.

Permuy Gallery and Marta Permuy's broader work in the arts has been covered by several publications including Latin American art journal Resumen, the Arts Coast Journal and Coral Gables News, as well as in books such as Outside Cuba: Contemporary Cuban Visual Artists, (1989) Breaking Barriers, (1997) and Cuban-American Art in Miami: Exile, Identity, and the Neo-Baroque (2004) where she was included among the founders of Miami's Cuban art community.

In 2021, The Permuy House was designated a landmark of the City of Coral Gables and included on the Coral Gables Registry of Historic Places on cultural and historic grounds due to its close association with Marta Permuy's career as the main base of her art activities for over forty years. In its Landmark Designation Report for the property, the Coral Gables Historic Resources & Cultural Arts Department stated "Marta played a pivotal role in supporting [...] launching and sustaining Cuban artists. The home is a touchstone to aid us in remembering and honoring her efforts.” The designation was subsequently covered by Coral Gables News where it was featured as the front-page story of that issue. The City of Coral Gables also issued an official press release outlining the significance of the Permuy House through the cultural contributions of Marta and Jesús Permuy. Following its landmark designation, the home was used to showcase the city’s historic preservation program and published on Gables Insider as well as the City of Coral Gables eNews "Preserving Our History" segment.

In 2022, several events marked the 50th anniversary of the launch of Permuy Gallery as well as the fifth anniversary of her death. On August 24, Coral Gables Mayor Vince Lago and the City Commission presented a City Proclamation declaring her birthday of September 22 as "Marta T. Permuy Day" in Coral Gables in honor of her cultural impact. On September 20, Congresswoman Maria Elvira Salazar (FL-27) delivered a Statement into the Congressional Record of the United States Congress titled "Honoring the Life of Marta Permuy," to recognize her activism and legacy. On November 16, the Coral Gables Historical Preservation Board voted unanimously to designate the former site of Permuy Gallery as a Coral Gables landmark due to its Cultural Historical significance in recognition of the art and cultural associations linked to property, particularly the contributions of Permuy Gallery and the art careers of Miguel Jorge and Marta Permuy.

In a May 2022 interview, Ricardo Pau-Llosa spoke of Permuy Gallery's legacy and impact, crediting it as “the first pioneer gallery of what would later become a Coral Gables signature: the hub of Latin American art,” as well as “the beginning of, and proposed the idea of […] Miami as ‘the bi-hemispheric city’ — where North American, European, Latin American, and African art converged on equal footing.”

In 2023, The Vasari Project created an archive for Marta Permuy due to her art career's cultural significance to South Florida and the Cuban community. The Vasari Project is overseen by the Miami-Dade Public Library System to document artistically significant records pertaining to the Miami-Dade County region from the Post-World War II era through to the present for research, scholarship, and preservation purposes.

In 2024, the Marta Permuy Legacy Collection was established in the Alvin Sherman Library, one of the largest in the state of Florida and part of Nova Southeastern University, with a donation by her grandson, Antonio Permuy. The art collection includes original works by Neith Nevelson, Pedro Hernandez, Mario Torroella, Margarita Cano, Edel Alvarez Galban, Adriano Nicot, Miguel Fleitas and others.

== Family and ancestry ==
Marta Cazañas Permuy was born into several prominent Cuban families. Her mother, Raquel M. Díaz y Teresa de Cazañas, was born in San Jose de los Ramos and was the daughter of José Lorenzo Díaz, member of the Cuban judiciary. Her family was also known regionally for financing the construction of a church in the greater Colón area to replace a small chapel that had served as the community religious gathering place. Marta cared for her mother at the Permuy House during her final years until her death in 1992.

Her father was the Cuban judge and politician Pedro Pablo Cazañas of the wealthy Cazañas family of Matanzas-area landowners. Marta's grandmother was the socialite and aristocrat Enriqueta García Martín de Cazañas. Much of Marta and her siblings upbringing took place in the family estates of Buena Vista and Dos Rosas in the Cárdenas area by Varadero. By way of her father's lineage, Marta was descendant of the Spaniard Peraza and Bobadilla families.

Marta's brother, Eduardo Enrique Cazañas Díaz, was the first in their family to arrive in the United States in 1959, settling in Rhode Island and Florida. As the Vietnam War escalated through the 1960s, he voluntarily enlisted in the United States Army with the rank of SP-4, an Armor Reconnaissance Specialist. He died in combat on January 7, 1967, at the age of 22. As a Cuban immigrant and son of Pedro Pablo Cazañas, his death was covered in English and Spanish media including the Diario Las Americas. He posthumously received the Purple Heart for his actions and is included in the Vietnam Veterans Memorial in Washington D.C. While raising her children, Marta would organize annual Memorial Day family trips to his memorial in Fort Lauderdale, Florida.

Marta was sister-in-law to noted psychiatrist, author, and Agrupación Católica Universitaria leader René de la Huerta (1920-2003) by way of his marriage to her older sister Raquel. As such Marta is aunt to author and spiritual leader Christian de la Huerta, their son.

Marta had seven children during her marriage to Jesús Permuy. One of their sons is Pedro Pablo Permuy, a former senior advisor to Madeleine Albright and later appointed by President Bill Clinton to serve as Deputy Assistant Secretary of Defense during his second term. She was also aunt to MasTec founder Jorge Mas Canosa by marriage of her daughter. Her children have remained active in the arts as art collectors and patrons and her grandchildren include artists, curators, and critics.

== See also ==
- Cuban art
- Latin American art
- Cubans in Miami
