= Marcos Pinedo =

Cuban-American art collector

- Born: July 22, 1948 (age 77); Havana, Cuba
- Occupations: Art collector, art patron, businessman
- Years active: 1970s – Present
- Known for: Marcos and Josefina Pinedo Fine Art Collection

Marcos F. Pinedo is a Cuban–American art patron, collector, and art dealer who was an active figure in contributing to the establishment of the Cuban and Latin American art market in South Florida. He and his wife, Josefina Camacho Pinedo, own the Pinedo fine art collection of prominent Latin American and European art.

== Background and early life ==
Marcos Fernando Pinedo was born on July 22, 1948, in Havana, Cuba and subsequently raised in the region of Matanzas. His cultural background through both his mother and father's families was Spanish. As such, all his grandparents were from Spain. His mother's family was Basque from the region of Bilbao with a background in farming while his father's family originated in the Canary Islands and worked in electrical and motor industries that had become increasingly profitable in the region during wake of the Industrial Revolution. Both lineages of his family migrated to Cuba as a result of the widespread political unrest of Spanish Civil War. Similarly, Pinedo's own life was greatly impacted by the Cuban Revolution and Fidel Castro’s subsequent rise to power. In the lead-up to the Bay of Pigs Invasion, his family arranged for him to be brought to the United States.

== Move to the United States ==
Pinedo participated in the Cuban exodus and emigrated to Miami on April 6, 1961, at the age of 12 as part of Operation Peter Pan, after which he became part of the Cuban diaspora residing in the United States. His parents, unable to leave due to government restrictions, would remain in Cuba. His maternal uncle Eric Beraza, a Spanish-born military boot manufacturer, was already living in the United States and was responsible for Pinedo's upbringing in the US. After a brief nine-day stay in Miami, the two would live in North Carolina where Beraza was residing.

They would stay in North Carolina for two years before returning to Miami to join his maternal grandparents who were leave Cuba and join the large Cuban exile community there. As a teenager Pinedo attended Miami Jackson Senior High School until the tenth grade when he and his uncle relocated to San Jose California to pursue better opportunities. While there he graduated high school and then attended San Jose City College where he studied languages.

== Art career and later life ==
In 1972 Pinedo returned to Miami and the following year he met Josefina Camacho, recently divorced from famed Cuban artist Juan González. Pinedo and Camacho met and had their first dates at the Permuy Gallery, one of the first Cuban art galleries in South Florida and an influential venue in supporting the Latin arts community of the region. The couple was close to the gallery's manager, fine art dealer and curator Marta Permuy. Pinedo and Camacho were active in Permuy's popular Friday Gallery Nights (known colloquially in the Cuban community as "los viernes") and its affiliated evening cultural salon gatherings. These long-running weekly events were an important cultural nexus in the early Latin American art market of South Florida.

In these gatherings Permuy would introduce Pinedo to many artists, collectors, and other community figures and was his first major immersion in the arts. Pinedo and Camacho were a frequent presence at these influential gatherings and Permuy would be a close associate and important advisor to Pinedo throughout his career. Through this network, Pinedo first began collecting art and building an extensive portfolio of several high-profile artists during this period. Pinedo was an early supporter of Baruj Salinas before his rise to international prominence and Pinedo would consistently collect works from Salinas’ various artistic periods since meeting in the 1970s. Salinas had also been a neighbor of González before his move to New York City. Pinedo would also be an avid collector of other Cuban artists during this formative period when the Latin American art market was beginning to take shape. Many of these were influential artists who helped shape that early landscape, such as other members of the Grupo GALA and the trio of Lourdes Gomez Franca, Dionisio "Denis" Perkins, and Miguel "Mickey" Jorge.

Pinedo and Camacho married on February 3, 1979. The couple remained on good terms with González and occasionally represented him in South Florida after he relocated to New York in the early 1970s. Beginning in the 1980s, Permuy helped Pinedo expand his involvement in the arts beyond collecting to include his own fine art dealing practice. He first became a prominent art figure in his own right during this period when Miami had emerged as an international art center with the fame of the "Miami Generation" of artists and the broad re-establishment of earlier artists from the Vieja Guardia generation. In 1983 the Pinedos contributed artworks that were featured in the Cuban Museum of Art's landmark exhibition from which the Miami Generation era drew its name. In the 1990s Pinedo founded and established Marcos Pinedo Fine Art Inc., through which he conducts his art dealings and transactions. In 2006 Pinedo provided most of the works used in Baruj Salinas' career retrospective exhibition held in Florida National University.

== The Pinedo collection ==
The Marcos and Josefina Pinedo fine art collection includes paintings, drawings, sculptures, and photography of Cuban, American, European, and other Latin American fine art. The styles range from figurative to total abstraction and include works that feature Cubism, Expressionism, Modernism, Realism and other 20th Century and Contemporary art genres and movements. Several works, such as those by Agustín Cárdenas and Juan González, represent the upper levels of the international Cuban art market.

The Pinedo Collection also holds the largest private collection of works by Baruj Salinas, spanning more than 30 works from various periods of Salinas’ career, including the artwork Spiraling II (1979) that features on the cover of the book BARUJ SALINAS. The collection also provided most of the works used for Salinas' 2006 career retrospective exhibition in Miami that spanned more than 30 works of acrylic paintings (including his noted Language of the Clouds series), drawings, and ceramics. Another key work from the Pinedo Collection is Juan Gonzalez's Splendor in the Grass (1970), which has been featured in the Miami Metropolitan Museum & Art Center (Kendall Branch) and Christie's New York.

Following the philosophy of his advisor Marta Cazañas Permuy, Pinedo would collect both renown, well-established artists as well as seek out and support unknown, struggling, and emerging artists to help them better establish themselves in the arts. He has also donated several artworks to the Museum of Art Fort Lauderdale and Florida National University.

In 1993, Marcos and Josefina Pinedo contributed to the book Dreamscapes: The Art of Juan González, which featured works from the Pinedo Collection.

=== Cuban art ===
The Marcos and Josefina Pinedo fine art collection is most associated with Cuban art. Beginning in the 1970s, Pinedo and his wife would support and collect several Cuban artists of the Vanguardia and Vieja Guardia generations. In the ensuing decades, their art collection would grow to include some of the most prominent Cuban painters of the 20th and 21st century, including: Wifredo Lam, Juan González, Baruj Salinas, Rafael Soriano, Enrique Riveron, Lourdes Gomez Franca, Dionisio Perkins, Miguel Jorge, Agustín Fernandez, Cundo Bermudez, Humberto Calzada, Emilio Hector Rodriguez, Carlos Macias (1951–1994), Paul Sierra, and Rolando Lopez Dirube. In addition painters, the Pinedos also collected works of sculptural art by Cuban sculptors: Agustín Cárdenas, Enrique Gay García, and Rafael Consuegra and photography from Miguel Fleitas.

=== American, European, and Latin American art ===
While the Pinedo collection is primarily composed of Cuban art, it also features several notable non-Cuban art, such American, European (French, Spanish), and other Latin American art (Mexican, Argentine, and Chilean). These include: Alexander Calder, Marc Chagall, Joan Miró, Eduardo Chillida, Roxana McAllister, Rufino Tamayo, Raul Anguiano, Roberto Matta, Rafael Ferrer, and Pérez Celis.

== Legacy ==
Pinedo and his contributed artwork to be featured in the defining 1983 "Miami Generation" exhibition that came to define Miami art in that decade as it emerged into an international art center. Pinedo has donated artwork from the Pinedo Collection to the Museum of Art Fort Lauderdale and Florida National University which have been added to their permanent collections. These include works by prominent artists Wifredo Lam, Baruj Salinas, and others. Many of these works by Salinas, Agustín Cárdenas, and Carlos Alfonzo, were featured in the major 1997 "Breaking Barriers" exhibition, which was later the subject of a book of the same name. He also contributed to and helped organize Salinas' 2006 career retrospective.

In addition to Breaking Barriers, Pinedo has also been mentioned and discussed in several other books and literature on Cuban art, including Cuban American Art in Miami: Exile, Identity, and the Neo-Baroque (2004), Cuban Artists Across the Diaspora: Setting the Tent Against the House (2011), and Abstraction: a tradition of collecting in Miami (1994) as well as El Nuevo Herald and The Miami Herald.

Works from the Pinedo Collection have also been featured in artist-specific books, including BARUJ SALINAS (1979), Dirube (1979), Dreamscapes: The Art of Juan González (1994), and Rafael Soriano and the Poetics of Light (1998).

== See also ==
- Cuban art
- Latin American art
