= Dionisio Perkins =

Cuban artist

- Born: 1929; Havana, Cuba
- Died: 2016 (aged 86–87); Coral Gables, Florida, U.S.
- Other names: Dennis Perkins, Denis Perkins
- Education: Self-taught
- Occupations: Artist, painter
- Years active: 1950s–2016
- Known for: Cuban exile and diaspora art, La Vieja Guardia movement

Dionisio Perkins (1929 – 2016), better known as Dennis (sometimes spelled "Denis") Perkins, was a Cuban artist recognized as a key member of the early Cuban exile art community in South Florida.

== Life and career ==
=== Early years ===
Dionisio Perkins Milian was born in Havana, Cuba in 1929 to an English father and Cuban mother. Due to his mixed cultural background, Perkins was fluently bilingual in English and Spanish throughout his life. While mostly self-taught in the arts, he did receive brief formal training from Cuban artist Domingo Ramos (1894–1956), who is mostly known for his landscapes.

Perkins career began in earnest in Havana during the late 1950s. In 1957 Perkins participated in group shows at El Vedado’s Lyceum. In 1959 he was part of several exhibitions in Cuban art venues, including the exhibition in honor of Vanguardia leader Victor Manuel, held in Havana’s Museo Nacional. Later that year Perkins also took part in their Arte y Artesanía exhibition and also exhibited again at the Lyceum. The following year would see him relocate to the United States.

=== Move to Miami ===
Following the turmoil of the Cuban Revolution and Fidel Castro’s rise to power, the Castro regime would crack down on artists and academics to bring them in-line with the Revolution’s aims and messaging. Perkins emigrated to the Miami area in 1960 and became part of the displaced Cuban diaspora. As a fluent bilingual, Perkins had a unique cultural advantage among many of the diaspora and used it to assist his friends and fellow artists. He resided in Coral Gables, Florida and would remain there the rest of his life. Perkins continued his painting career as a member of the Cuban exile art community that had become especially prominent in South Florida culture and would grow to dominate its art scene thereafter. Perkins, while reserved, would gradually emerge to become one of its more well-respected artists, participating regularly in exhibitions and winning multiple awards throughout his career, and continued painting until is death.

=== Network in the arts ===
Throughout his career Perkins was active in several social circles affiliated with Latin art in the greater Miami area. He is associated with his close friends and fellow artists Lourdes Gomez-Franca and Miguel ("Mickey") Jorge. The three would frequent art and social gatherings from the 1960s until each of their respective deaths and often exhibited together, as well as supported and influenced each other's careers. The trio are recognized as an important early group of Cuban artists in Miami that, along with the larger and more formal Grupo GALA, helped establish the modern Miami art market.

As with Lourdes and Jorge, Perkins was a close associate of Coral Gables-based fine art dealer and arts patron Marta Permuy. Permuy would represent Perkins often throughout his career and he was a regular guest at the Permuy House, along with Gomez Franca. He was also regularly featured in the Permuy Gallery, one of the first Cuban art galleries in South Florida, through the 1970s and a frequented her influential Friday salon discussions, which continued to be held at the Permuy House for decades following the gallery period. These salon gatherings were a significant cultural nexus for Miami Latin art and a way Perkins would meet and connect with collectors and other leading South Florida art figures. Other significant contacts for Perkins in the South Florida art community were fellow artist and gallerist Gloria Allison (1924–2013), younger artist Pablo Cano, and María Calas, who ran a successful frame shop popular with many Cuban artists and collectors who would network through her.

== Style ==
Perkins is identified generationally as part of the older wave within La Vieja Guardia ("The Old Guard") of Cuban art that followed the Vanguardia movement and his style reflected their influence. As such, and in contrast with his mild-mannered, witty, and genteel personality, Perkins' art is known for its moody, heavily saturated colors and figures with a Cuban interpretation of cubism that reflects his embrace of Pablo Picasso through the lens of his cultural heritage. His subjects were usually women or Cuban-inspired scenes, such as cityscapes and landscapes, with color always prominently on display. Perkins painted predominantly in oil or watercolor across canvas, paper, and wood and typically signed his paintings "D. Perkins" or "Perkins" followed by the year of the completed work, usually abbreviated.

Cuban art critic and Smithsonian Institution affiliate Giulio V. Blanc described Perkins’ distinct style as displaying "vividly aloof humanoids" with "dark tones." Armando Alvarez Bravo, another Cuban journalist and art critic, considered Perkins a modernist while Cuban art historian Lynette M.F. Bosch described his style as "quickly recognizable and "quintessentially Cuban."

== Exhibitions and recognition ==
Dionisio Perkins won several awards throughout his career. In 1959 Perkins won the prestigious Premio Guerlain at the Museo Nacional’s Arte y Artesanía exhibition. In 1965 he won the Third Place Prize for watercolor fine art in the CINTAS Foundation’s annual exhibition and was also a featured artist of the Second Pan-American Exhibition where he received an honorable mention. Perkins also won an honorable mention at the Miami Public Library System’s Cuban art exhibition of 1970. In 1975 he had a solo exhibition at the Bacardi Gallery, one of the venues for Cuban art in Miami during the 1970s. Perkins had also exhibited in the Miami Museum of Science and had been commissioned by Cardinal Francis Spellman of New York, one of his high-profile clients, to produce a series focused on the Stations of the Cross.

Cuban art journalist Armando Alvarez Bravo compared him to Eduardo Abela and Victor Manuel. Perkins was also covered substantially by The Miami Herald, El Nuevo Herald, and The Miami News over the course of his lifetime, including several full-length profiles by the latter (Dionisio Perkins: una pintura intima – Dionisio Perkins: An Intimate Painting; and Dionisio Perkins: el discreto encanto de la pintura – the discreet charm of painting). He was also featured on American and Latin American art journals and American art magazines such as Art in America (1982) and Arts Magazine (1990).

Perkins' artwork has also been featured and discussed in several books of Cuban art, particularly those focused on Cuban exile/diaspora art, such as Art of Cuba in Exile, Cuban-American Art in Miami: Exile, Identity and Neo-Baroque, and The Cuban-American Experience: Culture, Images, and Perspectives, Memoria: Cuban Art of the 20th Century and others.
