= Miguel Fleitas =

Cuban artist (born 1956)

- Born: Miguel Angel Fleitas, Jr. June 22, 1956; Havana, Cuba
- Education: University of Havana (History of Art), University of Oklahoma (Media Studies)
- Occupations: Visual artist, film director
- Known for: Photographic art and Cuban Expressionist painting
- Notable work: Farmers of the Sea series, Gallo (Rooster) series, The Breast Project
- Movement: Cuban Expressionism

Miguel A. Fleitas is a Cuban-American visual artist, photographer, and film director based in Miami, Florida. Fleitas was a television director and film editor for several popular television programs during his tenure with Univision and Telemundo. As an artist Fleitas has exhibited internationally, participated in high-profile exhibitions, and won awards since launching his art career in the 1980s. He is the son of Cuban filmmaker and artist Miguel Fleitas Sr.

== Background ==
Miguel Angel Fleitas was born in Havana, Cuba on June 22, 1956. He was first exposed to film and the arts through his parents, who were prominent figures in 20th century Cuban film. His father, Miguel Fleitas Sr., was a painter and noted filmmaker who gained recognition for establishing the Cuban Institute of Arts and Industry Cinematography (Instituto Cubano de Artes e Industria Cinematografica; ICAIC) and served as its founding director. His mother, Clarivel Suarez, was a lead production assistant in film for the ICAIC.

Among his father's many directorial film credits are the 1975 film The Smile of Victory, part of the Florida State University Libraries, as well as the 1979 film Etiopia Diario de una Victoria, which was added to the collection of Franklin and Marshall College's Phillips Museum of Art.

== Early life and career ==
Fleitas attended primary school in Valdes Rodriguez within the city of Havana and subsequently conducted his pre-university studies at Saul Delgado high school, also in Havana. He began his professional work in media as a radio operator in the Havana Radio Station. In 1979 he transitioned from radio to film and began working in the ICAIC's Film Laboratory and training in film and photography. During this period and into the 1980s, Fleitas began participating in group exhibitions in Cuba.

Alongside his work in the arts, he spent much of his early career also gaining recognition as a film director and cameraman. His film background would influence his approach to art in photography and later painting. Fleitas studied Art History in the University of Havana while he worked as Chief Graphic Designer for MINFAR Studios Film Department and later as their Documentaries Manager for Tourism. He also studied film and camera techniques in Havana with personal mentoring programs, completing his training in 1985.

== United States film career ==
Fleitas emigrated from Cuba in 1986 and subsequently joined the Cuban diaspora community in exile within South Florida. While in the United States, he continued his art as well as directorial work, now transitioning into television with the two leading Spanish-language networks Telemundo and Univision. He worked for Telemundo for ten years from 1991–2001. In 1995 he graduated from the University of Oklahoma and also participated in National Press Photographers Association (NPPA) 35th Television News and Video Production Conference sponsored by Sony.

During his tenure in Telemundo, Fleitas was first a cameraman, then reporter and finally editor of News Channel 51 in Miami. He then became Television and Technical Director for Venevision International (now Cisneros Media). In 2002 he also joined the national Univision, Telefutura, and Univision Deportes (Sports) Network as a floor manager and director. Fleitas worked for both Venevision International and Univision until he resigned from Venevision in 2006 to focus on his increasing demands with Univision. During his time with Venevision and Univision he directed a number of their most popular programs including ¿Quién Tiene la Razón?, Tu Desayuno Alegre, Escándalo TV, and Casos de Familia as well as soccer and boxing sports coverage.

Fleitas retired from film and television in 2013 to fully dedicate himself to his fine art career.

== Art career ==
Fleitas' fine art career began in the 1980s in Cuba with photography. He gained early recognition in 1982 for his series Farmers of the Sea. The black and white series was exhibited in the Pabellón Cuba in Havana which led to his winning a placement to tour and exhibit his work in twelve Latin American countries, his first professional award and recognition in the arts. The following year Fleitas enrolled in the University of Havana in 1983 studying Art History. In 1985 he won 6th Prize in the international Peace World Photography Exhibition in Poland for his series Happy Children. Despite this, his work in the arts remained secondary to his main career and profession as a media executive in the radio, film, and television industries for much of the following three decades. After emigrating to the United States, Fleitas began to expand his artistic mediums to include painting in the 1990s. By the 21st century, he would be an exhibiting artist in both solo and group exhibitions and win further awards. He has since become closely associated with his “The Breast Project” and his Gallo (Rooster) series of paintings, well as the “Giants in the City” public art exhibition series in Miami. Fleitas participated in the inaugural 2009 “Giants in the City” public art exhibition of monumental-scale sculptural installations organized by the Moore College of Art and Design. In addition to being a founding featured artist, Fleitas was also active in helping to organize the event. The event's success prompted a follow-up exhibition the following year at the Miami Beach Botanical Garden, near the Miami Beach Convention Center that hosts Art Basel Miami. Fleitas was again invited to participate in the 2010 exhibition, held during Miami Art Week, which was well-received drawing large audiences. Fleitas again participated in the 2011 installment, which saw the venue move to the larger Bayfront Park of Downtown Miami during Art Basel Miami. Fleitas also participated in the 2014 and 2015 installments of the public art series.

His notable photographic series include Stories in Time which captures stone sculptures in black and white, the nature series Quiet Moments as well as his award-winning Happy Children and Farmers of the Sea series, the latter of which was featured in the book Havana in My Heart: A celebration of Cuban Photography by Gareth Jenkins.

Fleitas’ artwork is sold through several major art outlets including Saatchi Art, Artnet, and ArtPrice and others. In terms of market value, Fleitas' best-performing works to date are those of his Breast Project series, which are typically valued above $10,000 and have surpassed $20,000 at auction.

== Style ==
Fleitas is an Expressionist influenced by the art movements of the 1970s as well as his Cuban cultural heritage. His paintings and photography are both influenced by his background in film and emphasize contrast and texture. His photographic style is most known for its use of black and white, but also occasionally ranges to include richly detailed color images. His subjects usually include depictions of scenes from Cuba and later his life in Miami after relocating to the United States.

Fleitas' paints in oil, acrylic, and mixed-media. In contrast with his photography, color is at the forefront of his paintings which were described in his 2007 Nuevo Herald profile as "a festival of color." Fleitas draws from a number of influences from his art history studies that he then applies to his Cuban cultural foundation. Examples include European Post-Impressionism, Fauvism, and Cubism, especially by way of Van Gogh, Matisse, and Picasso, respectively. Fleitas also draws influence from Cuban Vanguardia artists Victor Manuel, Mariano Rodríguez, and Mario Carreño. His father, Miguel Fleitas Sr., was another significant artistic influence with Fleitas dedicating his series Homenaje a mi padre of Cuban landscapes to his father. Fleitas often depicts Cuban-associated scenes such as tropical landscapes, roosters, female nude studies, and still lifes with vivid and saturated color to enhance vibrancy. His female torso series are often abstracted, such as without heads. Fleitas utilizes expressionistic methods to depict the female form in a purposefully sexualized way, utilizing bold exaggeration to challenge modern societal beauty conventions and standards that women are held to, particularly in Latin America. Fleitas also explored Latin American women as a subject in his Private Landscapes series.

Fleitas' torso paintings make up the majority of his series titled "The Breast Project," of which another expression is his public art installation of monumental-scale inflatable breast-shaped sculptures which have been prominently featured in the "Giants in the City" exhibitions held during Art Basel Miami and Miami Art Week. In his artist statement for The Breast Project, Fleitas explained “The word ‘breast’ is a metaphor for ‘women’ in general" and that the series is designed to "challenge our contemporary ideas of beauty, to counter stereotypes and to depict non-idealized women," including reactions against the widespread pressures of artificial breast augmentation and other modern cosmetic "obsessions" that exist in modern life. In interviews Fleitas expanded on this, describing these works as “a tribute to the sacrifice of Latin women, who are forced to modify their image so as to compete in a world marked by limited beauty canons.”

In contrast with these abstracted works, his Gallo (rooster) series, focuses on roosters, a quintessential symbol of Cuba, that are frequently done in large scales with an intricately detailed style, often offsetting the hyper-detailed representations of the roosters in black-and-white sketching with selective color usage, evoking his photographic work. When interviewed by El Nuevo Herald for the 2018 “Rooster Gallo Galo Gallus” exhibition at the Milander Center for Arts, Fleitas explained the inspiration behind his Gallo series to be “I have wanted to represent this animal as a bird with great strength, courage, respect, admiration and power.” To this end, each work in the series features only a single color and is paired with intense underlying drawings to communicate a bold, streamlined effect. Fleitas also explained that his figurative depictions of roosters drew historical inspiration from gladiators in a symbolic reference to their popular use in cockfights throughout Latin America. A third frequent painted series of Fleitas' work is his Tulipanes al Viento (Tulips in the Wind) series of floral still lifes. Fleitas has also composed diptychs and triptychs of his Rooster, Breast Project, and Tulipanes al Viento series.

In describing his general creative process, Fleitas has said "To me painting has always been a great mystery, like a secret and something I've always loved [...] I don’t measure myself – I express myself. I don’t think about rules, but instead I think about the moment."

== Exhibitions ==
To date, Fleitas has participated in over thirty exhibitions of his art. As both a solo artist and in group exhibitions, Fleitas has exhibited in several prominent fine art markets including New York City, the Wynwood Art District, South Beach, Coral Gables, and Coconut Grove as well as internationally in Cuba, Europe, and Latin America.

=== Select solo exhibitions ===
- "EVOLUTION." Domingo Padron Gallery, Coral Gables, Fl. Exhibition of works from Fleitas' Rooster series. September 2013
- “The Maker, Back to Black.” Cafeina, Wynwood Exhibition Center, Wynwood, Fl. Exhibition of 30 Photographs. June 2013
- “Con el mayor respeto... BLACK & WHITE.” Domingo Padron Gallery, Coral Gables, Fl. Exhibited 30 Photographs within three series of work. March 2009
- "Miguel Fleitas: Retrospective." Market Grill, South Miami Beach, Fl. Retrospective exhibition of 17 acrylic and oil paintings composed between 1996–2007. February 2008
- “Private Landscapes.” Out of the Blue, Miami, Fl. Exhibition of 29 paintings. April 2007

=== Select group exhibitions ===
- “Rooster Gallo Galo Gallus.” Milander Center for Arts and Entertainment, Hialeah, Fl. Featured work from Rooster series. August 2018
- "Two Painters." Habana 305 Art Gallery, featured with Mila Pelaez. October 2015
- “Somos de la Casa.” Habana 305 Art Gallery. Featured alongside Carlos M. Galindo and Pepe Orbein. February 2015
- “Out of the Box.” Irreversible Art Space. Booth # 516. Miami Beach Convention Center. Miami Art Fair. January 2011
- "Giants in the City. Inflatable sculpture public art project. Alejandro Mendoza, Curator, Miami Beach Botanical Garden, Fl. August 2010
- “Giants in the City.” Inflatable sculpture public art project. Alejandro Mendoza, Curator. Bayfront Park, Miami, Fl. December 2009
- “The Wizard,” Miami, Fl. Collaboration project with Frank Hyder. December 2009
- “Diosa del Mar”. Domingo Padron Gallery, Coral Gables, Fl. Exhibition of paintings. August 2009
- “Voice for Children.” Exhibition and Live Auction. Coconut Grove, Miami, Fl. March 2009
- Clearcast Digital Media & Redd Post, Miami, Fl. Art Basel & Art Miami. 2007.
- International Peru Expo. Sheraton Hotel Miami, Miami, Fl. 2007
- "Hispanic Heritage in America," Museum of the Americas, Doral, Fl. 2007.
- Doral Country Club’s 3rd Art Exhibition, exhibited paintings and photography. Awarded 2nd place for Best Photography. Doral, Fl. 2007
- "100th Anniversary of the Independence of Cuba" exhibition. SONO Art Gallery, New York, NY. 2002
- Peace World Photography, Poland, Europe. Exhibited Happy Children series, photography. Awarded 6th place internationally for photography. 1985
- "Cuban Photographers Present...", Pabellón Cuba, Havana, Cuba. Exhibited Farmers of the Sea series, photography. 1982

== Recognition and reputation ==
Fleitas has participated in multiple high-profile art events including Art Basel and "Giants in the City." He has also won multiple fine art awards throughout his career. Fleitas' first fine arts award came in 1982 when he won a place to tour twelve Latin American countries in the 1980s for his photography series Farmers of the Sea. He also won 6th Prize for his series Happy Children in the international Peace World Photographers Exhibition in Poland among hundreds of global entries. Fleitas also won the 2nd Prize in the 2007 Doral Art Festival, held in the Doral Country Club, for his photographs The Hunter, In Paradise, Golden Fruit, and Lovers.

Fleitas has been closely affiliated with prominent South Florida art figures including curator Alejandro Mendoza, who organized and spearheaded the long-running “Giants in the City” public art installations, as well as Marcos and Josefina Pinedo, whose Cuban art collection features several works by Fleitas.

When Fleitas retired from film to focus on his art, journalist Juan Manuel Cao wrote “[Fleitas] has returned to his roots, because now his palette has broadened, even when doing black and white, and because he sees what the rest of do not: shadows, shades, unforeseen places.” On his photography, Cao stated: “Fleitas’ magic lens grants a poetic dignity [...] And this is, perhaps, the responsibility of true artists: to light up the corners of life which otherwise would have remained unnoticed.” In discussing Fleitas' work, writer Rubén Géller stated “Even though Miguel Fleitas insists on exhibiting life in black and white, the onlooker feels the colors and gets into the diversion of completing the visual rainbow. [Fleitas] is a detector of essences.”

Fleitas was included in the Irreversible project magazine along with Pablo Cano, Miguel Rodez, and other leading Miami artists and has been covered by the Miami Herald, Hello Magazine, and several Spanish media outlets including El Nuevo Herald and Voz de America.

His art is also featured in literature and books of Cuban art, including Havana in My Heart: A Celebration of Cuban Photography, (republished in English and French in 2004), and Mujer Desnuda (2012)

In September 2024, a piece from Fleitas’ Gallos series was accepted into the permanent collection of the Alvin Sherman Library, one of the largest libraries in the state of Florida, as part of the Marta Permuy Legacy Collection. The library’s permanent collection features work by other established artists including Salvador Dalí, Peter Max, and Dale Chihuly. The piece was previously featured in Fleitas’ 2013 Coral Gables solo exhibition of his Rooster series. It was subsequently unveiled with an exhibition at the library in October 2024.

== Personal life ==
Fleitas was named after his father, Miguel Fleitas Sr. (1926-2002), who was also a noted Cuban artist and film director.

He has two children, a son, Hiram Fleitas, and daughter Ana Laura Fleitas, both fine art collectors and dealers.

Fleitas currently works and resides in Miami, Florida.
