= Laureano Garcia-Concheso =

Cuban painter and sculptor

Laureano Garcia-Concheso (16 August 1922 – 12 September 2000) was a Cuban painter and sculptor, recognised by his cubist style of painting and by his still life. Garcia-Concheso began his studies in architecture at the University of Havana, however his real interests lay in painting and sculpting, which he later studied in Paris with two figures of rank at the time, the sculptor Ossip Zadkine and painter André Lhote.

Garcia-Concheso was a cultural attaché for the government of Fulgencio Batista in Germany, so as the government fell to the forces of Fidel Castro in 1960 he could not return to Cuba, even though his family were mostly still there. He went instead to New York which was then the centre of the contemporary art scene, to study graphics at the Art Students League and the Pratt Institute in New York City.

Although the basics of Garcia-Concheso's painting lies in Spanish realism, his still life in particular has an airy lightness that may be viewed as a legacy of impressionism. The structure of his compositions, moreover, reflect the influence of synthetic Cubism.

== Career ==
He studied architecture at the University of Havana and art in Paris under sculptor Ossip Zadkine and the painter Andre Lhote. In the United States, he attended Fairfield University in Connecticut, the Pratt Institute and the Art Students League.

He soon received a commission from an art exhibition to copy the twelve apostles painted by EL Greco which are in Toledo, the town just south of Madrid where El Greco lived. He then moved to Madrid where he lived for the next twenty years, painting and holding exhibitions all over the world.

Throughout his career, Garcia-Concheso showcased a number of one-man shows and group exhibitions, most notably in Havana, Madrid, New York and Miami, where many of his sculptures are still displayed in public spaces. Laureano later received offer of fellowships from both, the Cuban Government and the CINTAS Foundation.
