= Pedro Pablo Cazañas =

Cuban judge

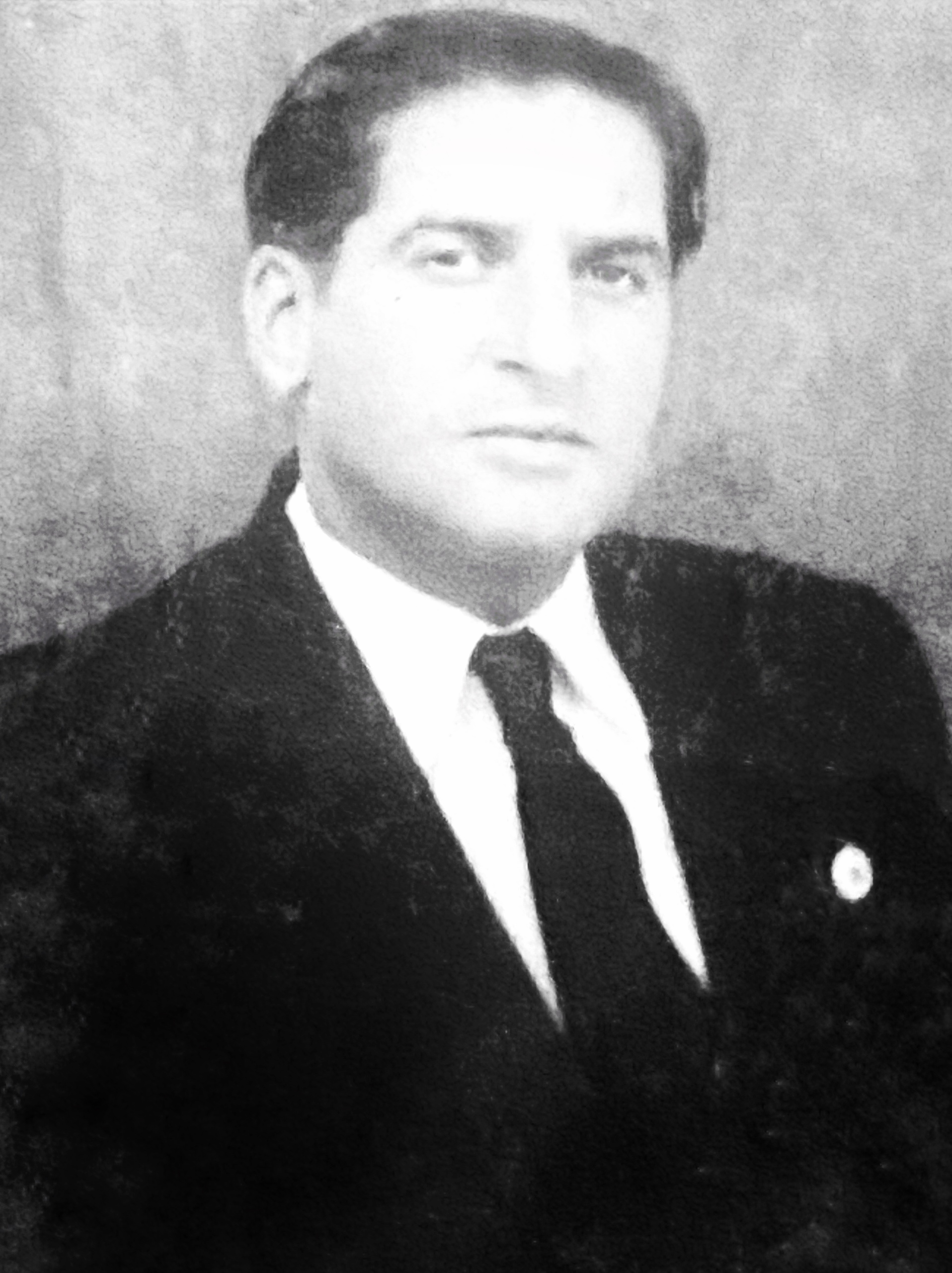
- Pedro Pablo Cazañas, Circa 1938
- Born: Pedro Pablo Cazañas y García; December 5, 1902; Matanzas, Cuba
- Died: June 28, 1978 (aged 75); Miami, Florida
- Other name: Doctor Pedro Cazañas
- Education: University of Havana (Doctorate of Law)
- Occupations: Judge, attorney

Pedro Pablo Cazañas y García (December 5, 1902 – June 28, 1978) was a Cuban judge and politician.

== Early life ==
Pedro Pablo Cazañas y García was born December 5, 1902, in Matanzas, Cuba to Francisco E. Cazañas and Enriqueta García Martín. He was raised on his family's Buena Vista estate near Varadero. Cazañas would remain in Cuba for much of his life before emigrating to the United States in the late 1960s as a result of the Cuban Revolution.

== Career ==
Cazañas attended the University of Havana, earning a doctorate in law, after which Cazañas was often referred to as "Doctor Pedro (Pablo) Cazañas" in official documents, journals, and media. Cazañas initially served as a traveling judge, holding court in various locations across Cuba that required a judge on a case-by-case basis before becoming an increasingly prominent in the Cuban judiciary.

In the 1930s Cazañas married Raquel María Díaz Teresa, thereafter Raquel Díaz Cazañas. The marriage was significant due to the Díaz family's importance in the San José de los Ramos area of Matanzas. Her father, José Lorenzo Díaz, was an administrator in the Cuban judicial system, working in the Juzgado de Primera Instancia (Court of First Instance) of the broader Colón area until his death in 1954. The Díaz family was also regarded for replacing the small chapel in the town center with a grand church. Raquel Díaz and Cazañas had three children - Raquel, Marta, and Eduardo - all born in Havana and raised in the Cazañas family's properties in Matanzas.

After the coup d'état of 1952, Cazañas' stature in Cuba's judiciary rose further through the rest of the 1950s during the regime of Fulgencio Batista. During that period, Batista had planned to attend and serve as a witness in the wedding of Cazañas’ eldest child, Raquel, to high-profile psychiatrist and Agrupación Católica Universitaria leader Rene de la Huerta. However Batista was unable to attend due to his required presence in state visit abroad, therefore a top representative was sent to the ceremony in his place. Cazañas’ affiliation with Batista would be a recurring source of generational tension with his children, who were opposed to Batista and supported democratic reforms in Cuba. In the 1950s, Cazañas would also serve as a Juez de Instrucción.

== Later life ==
The Cazañas family opposed Fidel Castro and, following the Cuban Revolution, were gradually able to leave the island to take refuge in the United States and seek life in democracy there. The first of his children to leave Cuba was Eduardo, in 1959, who would later join the United States Armed Forces. Cazañas' younger daughter, Marta, was deeply involved in the counter-revolution against Castro and left to the United States with her future husband Jesús Permuy, a leader of the counter-revolution, via Venezuela following the failure of the 1961 Bay of Pigs Invasion.

Cazañas, his wife, their eldest daughter, his siblings and several other relatives remained in Cuba and were unable to leave for much of the 1960s. When his son Eduardo died in combat during the Vietnam War, the family sought to attend his funeral, however it was difficult for the remaining family in Cuba to participate due to diplomatic strains with the United States. Cazañas and his wife went to Mexico as a simpler way to reach the United States, however Cazañas contracted tuberculosis and was ultimately unable to attend the services and ceremonies. The couple relocated permanently to Miami by 1968 and their eldest daughter's family joined them the following year.

After emigrating to the United States, he lived out the rest of his life in retirement. He died in Miami on June 28, 1978, at the age of 75.

== Family ==
=== Immediate ancestry ===
Both Pedro Pablo Cazañas’ ancestry and descendants have been a prominent force in Europe (especially Spain), the Caribbean, and the United States. In his immediate family, Cazañas’ grandfather, Francisco José Cazañas y Peraza (born 1840) was directly descendant of the Peraza and Bobadilla families that were influential in the Castilian royal court, ruled the Canary Islands, and participated in the conquest of the New World, including Cuba and Hispaniola. It was this Peraza lineage of the family that traveled from Spain to Cuba and the United States in the nineteenth century. Francisco J. Cazañas Peraza (sometimes written as Francis), would gain American citizenship, and was a landowner in New Rochelle, New York. Therefore, his son, Francisco Eduardo (Pedro Pablo's father), was born in New Rochelle, giving him dual citizenship with the United States and Cuba. Several generations of the Cazañas family would maintain regular business travel to the United States and be educated there before ultimately migrating back to the United States permanently following the Cuban Revolution. In Cuba the Cazañas family were significant landholders in Matanzas and owned several large estates, manor houses, and plantations, including the historic sugar plantation Dos Rosas, which was purchased in 1868 by Bartolomé Cazañas, great-grandfather of Pedro Pablo Cazañas. The country estate was originally named "San Francisco de Paula-Riverol" and Bartolomé Cazañas renamed it that year to "Dos Rosas" (Spanish for "Two Roses") in honor of his Italian wife and their daughter, both named Rosa.

Cazañas's mother, Enriqueta García y Martín, was heiress of the García family of Spain. At the age of sixteen, Enriqueta was the subject of a poem included in the 1878 Jardín Matancero ("Matanzas Garden"). The publication was a literary collection dedicated to the debutantes of the Matanzas region's most prominent families in which a flower-themed poem was dedicated to each emerging ("blossoming") socialite. As an adult she owned the vast finca Buena Vista overlooking Varadero, its champion horses, and yacht while her husband Francisco would manage the estate's staff and grounds. The property was damaged in the Spanish–American War and became the center of the couple's high-profile claims to the Spanish Treaty Claims Commission. The couple, which traveled frequently to the United States and would occasionally reside there, first filed their claims with the commission in 1902, the year Pedro Pablo was born. It took six years to settle their claims, in which Francisco's legal background and US ties proved useful. Their claims were finally settled in 1908 when the Secretary of the Treasury of the United States awarded the couple total compensation of $13,138 ($9,738 to Enriqueta and $3,400 to Francisco), equivalent to over $360,000 in 2020, adjusted for inflation. They received the second highest awards granted by the commission, and the highest among private citizens not representing a corporation. Her brother (Pedro Pablo's uncle), Félix García y Martín, was a prominent doctor and insurrection figure during the Cuban War of Independence who became the second highest-ranking doctor in the Matanzas province and was later Chief Doctor of the Port of Matanzas and Head of Administration.

=== Extended ancestry ===
Pedro Pablo Cazañas’ ancestry is noted for several prominent lines. In addition to the Perazas, Bobadillas, García's and Martín's, he is directly descended from several other ancient Spanish and other European (French, English) noble and royal families, including the Guzmán, Haro, Lara, de Luna, Martel, and more distantly, the Plantagenets. He is descendant of the line of the Martel family that migrated from Carolingian France to Spain by way of Aragon and then to Seville during the Reconquista era and is descendant of the Plantagenets through Eleanor of England.

=== Progeny ===
His son, Eduardo Enrique Cazañas y Díaz, emigrated to the United States in 1959 and quickly embraced his adopted homeland. He settled in Rhode Island, attending university to become an agricultural engineer and married his girlfriend in 1965. Eduardo is most known for his military service. With the escalation of the Vietnam War in the mid-1960s, he voluntarily enlisted in the United States Army to serve his adopted country and received the rank of SP-4 as an Armor Reconnaissance Specialist. He died in combat in 1967 at the age of 22, his death was covered in both Spanish and English media, including the Diario Las Américas, which described him as the son of "Doctor Pedro Cazañas." He received the Purple Heart for his actions in battle and is included in the Vietnam Veterans Memorial in Washington, D.C.

Both his daughters, Raquel and Marta, would have high-profile marriages to Cuban leaders. Raquel married Rene de la Huerta, a noted psychiatrist, writer, and a leader of the Agrupación Católica Universitaria in Cuba, Spain, and the United States. Cazañas' younger daughter, Marta Cazañas, was married to Cuban architect, community leader, and human rights advocate Jesús Permuy. The couple met in and were both prominent figures of the Anti-Castro Counter-Revolution and relocated to the United States following the Bay of Pigs Invasion. In the United States Marta became an influential fine art dealer, curator, promoter, and collector. She managed and co-founded the historic Permuy Gallery in Coral Gables, Florida, one of the first Cuban fine art galleries established in South Florida and credited with helping establish the early Miami Latin art market. Her children and grandchildren have in turn become prominent figures in art, architecture, politics, and finance. Marta's second son, Pedro Pablo Permuy, was named after Cazañas and served as Deputy Assistant Secretary of Defense (DASD) in the Clinton Administration and later as President of the US-Spain Council, where he would host and organize events with US Secretary of State Hillary Clinton and King Felipe VI of Spain.

== See also ==
- Judicial system of Cuba
- Enriqueta García y Martín
- Peraza family
