= Enriqueta García Martín =

Cuban aristocrat and businesswoman

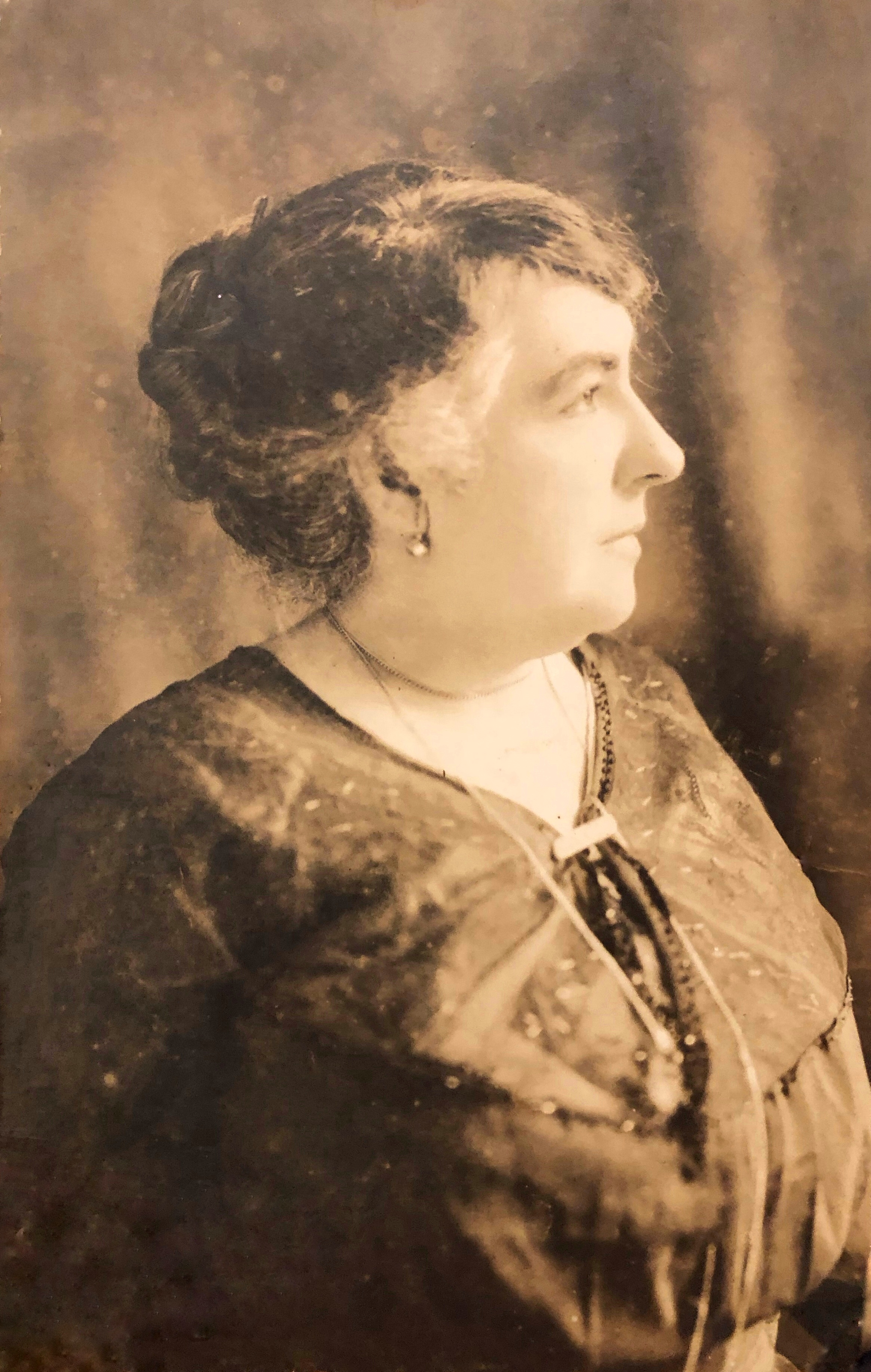
- Enriqueta García Martín Portrait Photograph, Circa 1900
- Born: Enriqueta García y Martín; 1862; Matanzas, Cuba
- Died: c. 1930; Cardenas, Cuba
- Other names: Enriqueta García Martín y Cazañas, Enriqueta García Cazañas, Enriqueta Cazañas
- Occupation: Landowner
- Known for: Owner of the Buena Vista Estate, farms, and sugar plantation
- Relatives: Pedro Pablo Cazañas (son)

Enriqueta García y Martín de Cazañas (1862–1930) was a prominent Cuban socialite, landowner, and agricultural businesswoman.

== Life ==
=== Family and early life ===
Enriqueta García y Martín was born on November 3, 1862, in Matanzas, Cuba to the wealthy García family of Spain. Their family was of considerable prominence in the broader Matanzas province. Her brother, Félix García y Martín (sometimes misprinted as Telix), was a doctor and a regional insurgent leader in Matanzas during the Cuban War of Independence. After the war, he continued to be an active medical figure in the region and assisted American forces stationed there during the ensuing period following the conclusion of the Spanish–American War. Dr. García then became second highest-ranking doctor in the Matanzas province and was later promoted to Chief Doctor of the Port of Matanzas, Head of Administration.

As her brother focused his efforts and attention to his medical, political, and administrative career, Enriqueta became heiress to the García estate and administrator of its properties and financial holdings. At sixteen she was the subject of a poem included in the 1878 literary collection Jardín Matancero ("Matanzas Garden"). The publication was dedicated to the debutantes of the Matanzas region in which a flower-themed poem was dedicated to each "blossoming" socialite.

García resided in historic Camarioca, in close proximity to the famed Varadero resort town, now incorporated into the nearby region of Cárdenas. She was molded by her upbringing in the broader Cárdenas community, which was founded by old Spanish aristocracy in 1828 and housed many elite European families. By García's lifetime, the area had a distinct Southern American influence and was known as the "Charleston of the Caribbean" due to its unique design that broke with the traditional central-plaza Spanish layout found in much of Latin America, instead using a North American grid pattern modeled on the city of Charleston. Its unique character, complete with straight and narrow streets and horse-drawn carriages, attracted an influx of European families from Spain, France, Italy, and the United Kingdom, such as the Garcías and the Martins. These factors would influence her later travel and the upbringing of her children.

=== Marriage ===
While residing in Cárdenas as an adult, García would meet landowner Francisco E. Cazañas, of another prominent Matanzas family who owned many landholdings and agricultural industry interests. Cazañas inherited a large Cárdenas property in 1890, and met García upon his relocation to the area from New York. The couple wed on April 30, 1894 and, in accordance with Spanish naming customs, after their marriage García was known as Enriqueta García Martín de Cazañas, or, more simply, Enriqueta García Cazañas. The marriage was significant due to Cazañas, having been born in New Rochelle, New York, holding dual citizenship with the United States and Cuba, and being descendant of the Castilian Peraza family through his father, Francisco José Cazañas y Peraza (sometimes recorded as Francis), an agriculture estate landowner in New Rochelle. García herself received American citizenship after her marriage to Cazañas and would subsequently travel with an American passport.

The couple became a public and legal focal point during the Spanish-American War following the destruction of several of their plantations in Santa Clara, Cuba by Spanish troops. They had been under suspicion from the Spanish armed forces due to each of their respective family ties to various independence figures, with García's brother being Insurgent leader Félix García y Martín and Cazañas's relation to the pro-Independence branch of the Peraza family based in Cuba. One of their properties in Sagua was destroyed by the Spanish in March 1896. Francisco Cazañas was subsequently arrested on February 13, 1897, by Spanish troops and held for over three weeks while their other properties were searched and damaged with five being burned. This sparked an international diplomatic incident between Washington D.C. and Madrid due to the couple's American citizenship and social status, resulting in wide coverage by American media including the Los Angeles Express, The Cedar Rapids Gazette, The Evening Journal, The Baltimore Sun, The Boston Globe, and The New York Times. This arrest as well as the damage to the Cazañas-García properties would result in the couple's postwar claims to the Spanish Treaty Claims Commission.

The couple frequently traveled to the United States and would resided in their New York property during the duration of the war following Cazañas' release. There are surviving records of visits to New York City (1892, 1897) and New Orleans (1898). The couple had three sons, the eldest of which, Enrique, they would arrange to have educated in the United States and reside in Nashville and Winter Park.

== Buena Vista ==
García notably owned the Buena Vista estate in Camarioca and its vast grounds. The Buena Vista property, sometimes written as Buenavista, was renown for its immensity and held its own main roads, stream, hills, prize horses, cattle, ox, as well as full staff and yacht for its proximity to Varadero. The couple resided there and, per the US Consulate records, her husband managed the property's sprawling farmlands and major sugar plantation, often known collectively as "Finca Buena Vista," which were significant agricultural businesses in the Matanzas province.

The property was damaged during the Battle of Cárdenas in the Spanish–American War and became the center of the couple's high-profile claims case to the Spanish Treaty Claims Commission. The couple first filed their claims with the commission in 1902. It took six years to settle their claims, during which Francisco's legal background and US ties and citizenship proved useful as their claims were settled in 1908 with the Secretary of the Treasury of the United States awarding the couple total compensation of $13,138 ($9,738 to Enriqueta and $3,400 to Francisco), over $375,000 in 2021, after inflation. They received the second highest awards granted by the commission, and the highest among private citizens not representing a corporation. Their legal case was the subject of a book published in 2012, Francisco E. Cazañas and Enriqueta Garcia v. The United States.

While the couple also owned other property, the manor house would remain the Cazañas family's main residence until the Cuban Revolution, after which it was nationalized and made into a village (subdivision) of Cardenas.

=== Other properties and businesses ===
Their filings with the Spanish Treaty Claims Commission offered other rare glimpses into the Cazañas-García property holdings. They describe the family's "extensive landed estates" that were each "elaborately and expensively furnished." Other estates mentioned in addition to Buena Vista included Dos Rosas, Pura y Limpia, Dolores, Rosario, and others, all of which sustained at least some damage during the Cuban War of Independence. Some were adjacent to each other and some were on the coast described in court documents as "Situated on a sort of promontory extending out into the ocean between the Bay of Cárdenas and Bay of Matanzas" within "a strategic area to combatants," likely Varadero. Many of these functioned as sugar estates, plantations, and stock farms throughout the Matanzas province in the towns and districts of Camarioca, Santana, and Cárdenas. A Peraza relative of Cazañas testified to the commission "I witnessed the destruction of some splendid houses [Francisco] Cazañas had on Santana." The couple made the Pura y Limpia estate their main residence during the extent of the battles, during which Spanish forces viewed them with suspicion due to the prominent role of García's brother, Dr. Félix García Martín, in the insurgency, causing the couple to relocate temporarily to the United States as the Spanish American War progressed.

While many of their properties had originally belonged to the García family, it is known that the historic Dos Rosas sugar plantation estate was already in the ownership of the Cazañas family, having been purchased in 1868 by Bartolomé Cazañas, a grandfather of Francisco E. Cazañas. The vast estate was originally named "San Francisco de Paula-Riverol" and Bartolomé Cazañas renamed it that year to "Dos Rosas" (Spanish for "Two Roses") in honor of his Italian wife, Rosa Cambiaggi, and their daughter. The Cazañas-García family also owned properties in Santa Clara, Sagua la Grande, and Havana. As with Buena Vista, all of these estates, plantations, and mills were dismantled or nationalized after the Cuban Revolution and many, including Dos Rosas and Pura y Limpia, were made into small towns and villages.

== Later life and progeny ==
=== Death ===
Enriqueta García's health declined later in life as she developed brain cancer, eventually dying from the disease by the mid-1930s.

=== Progeny ===
García is also noted for her descendants. García and her husband had three sons: successful Havana businessman Enrique Cazañas, the prominent judge Pedro Pablo Cazañas, and Eduardo, the youngest.

Her granddaughters by Pedro Pablo Cazañas, Raquel and Marta, would have high-profile marriages to Cuban leaders Rene de la Huerta (a psychiatrist and leader of the Agrupación Católica Universitaria) and Jesús Permuy, respectively. Her grandson by Pedro Pablo, Eduardo Cazañas y Díaz, voluntarily enlisted in the United States Army with the rank of SP-4 as an Armor Reconnaissance Specialist. He died in combat in 1967 during the Vietnam War and his death was covered in both English and Spanish media, including the Diario Las Americas. He received the Purple Heart for his actions in battle, was interred in Lauderdale Memorial Park, and is included in the Vietnam Veterans Memorial in Washington D.C.

Her great-grandchildren would include further noted figures such as the author and spiritual leader Christian de la Huerta and former Deputy Assistant Secretary of Defense (DASD) and United States-Spain Council President, Pedro Pablo Permuy.

== See also ==
- Spanish nobility in Cuba
- Cuban sugar economy
- Battle of Cárdenas
- Pedro Pablo Cazañas
