= Uva de Aragón =

Cuban American author and scholar

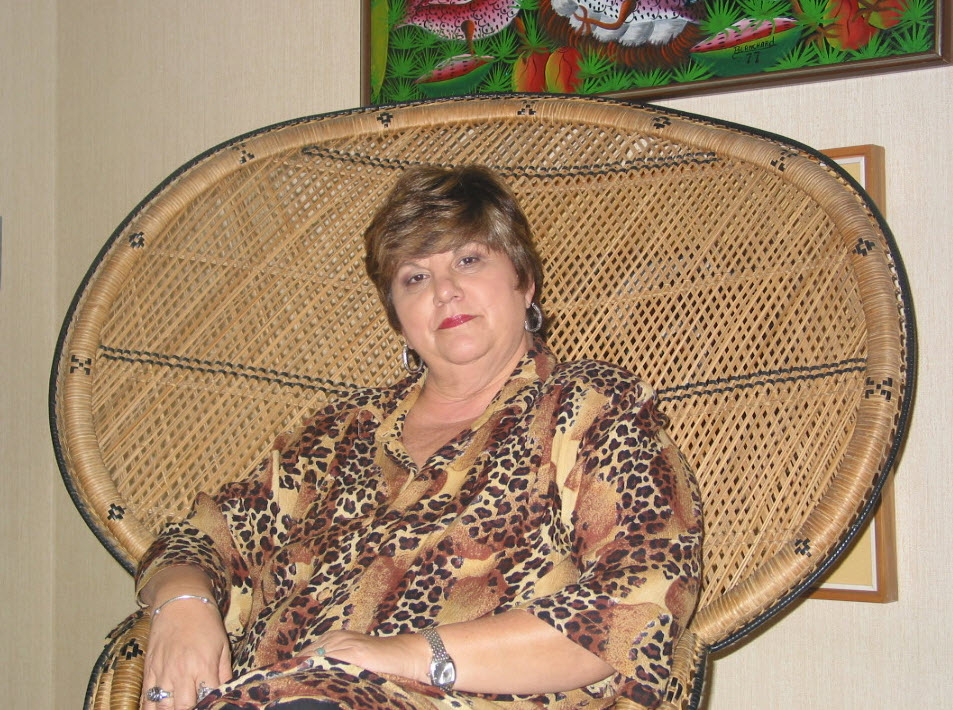
- Born: 1944 (age 81–82) Havana, Cuba
- Occupation: Scholar, novelist, poet, essayist, journalist, playwright
- Notable works: The Memory of Silence; El reino de la infancia — Memorias de mi vida en Cuba
- Notable awards: Cintas Fellowship for Literature, 1980-81; International Latino Book Awards, 2016, Second place Best Novel - Historical Fiction – Spanish or Bilingual, The Memory of Silence; Florida Book Awards, 2021, Spanish Language - Bronze, El reino de la infancia — Memorias de mi vida en Cuba

Website
- uvadearagon.wordpress.com

Uva de Aragón (born 1944) is a Cuban American author and scholar. She has published poems, essays, newspaper columns, short stories, novels, and a play. Her first novel, Memories of Silence/Memoria del Silencio, won second place Best Historical Novel – Spanish or Bilingual at the 2016 International Latino Book Awards.

== Early life and education ==
De Aragón was born in Havana, Cuba in 1944. She comes from a family of Spanish and Cuban writers. In 1959, de Aragón went into exile in the United States with her family. She then lived in Washington, D.C., New York, and Maryland before settling in Miami in 1978.

She studied at Biscayne College and earned a doctorate in Latin American and Spanish Literature from the University of Miami.

== Career ==
de Aragón began publishing in US newspapers in the 1960s. She was a columnist for Diario Las Americas and later El Nuevo Herald. Her work as a journalist has continued through the present day. From 1987 through June 2011, de Aragón was a professor and Associate Director of the Cuban Research Institute at Florida International University. She also served as the Associate Editor of the academic journal Cuban Studies.

== Publications ==
Though de Aragón is fluent in English the majority of her writing is in Spanish.

=== Fiction ===
- Eternidad (1971)
- Ni Verdad ni Mentira y Otros Cuentos (1977)
- Tus Ojos y Yo (1985)
- No Puedo Más y Otros Cuentos (1989)
- Pensadores Hispano-Americanos: Ciclo de Conferencias (1995)
- Los Nombres del Amor (1996)
- Repensando a Martí (1998)
- Memoria del silencio (2002)
- El Milagro de San Lázaro: Un Misterio de Más de Viente Años (2016)
- The Miracle of Saint Lazarus: A Mystery Twenty Years in the Making (Translation from Spanish, 2019)
- El Crimen de Biltmore Way: Un Caso de la Detective Maria Duquesne (2020)
- The Memory of Silence (Translation from Spanish, 2014)
- Murder on Biltmore Way: A case of detective María Duquesne (Translation from Spanish, 2024)
- De amores y guerras: Cuba y España (2024)

=== Film ===
- Amelia del Castillo (2004)
- Orlando Rodriguez (2004)
- Yara Gonzalez Montes. Matias Montes-Huidobro. (2005)
- Rita Geada (2005)
- Orlando Gonzalez-Esteva (2005)
- Interview with Cristobal Diaz-Ayala (2009)
- Cuban America (2013)

=== Nonfiction ===
- El Caimán ante el Espejo: Un Ensayo de Interpretación de lo Cubano (1993)
- Alfonso Hernández-Catá, un Escritor Cubano, Salmantino y Universal (1996)
- Repensando a Martí (1998)
- Morir de Exilio (2006)
- Crónicas de la República de Cuba: 1902-1958 (2009)
- El mundo y mi Cuba en el Diario (2016)
- El Reino de la Infancia. Memorias de mi vida en Cuba (2021)

=== Poetry ===
- Entresemáforos: Poemas Escritos en Ruta (1981)

=== Compilations featuring Uva de Aragón ===
- Treinta Años del Instituto de Estudios Cubanos (1999); El Instituto de Estudios Cubanos a 30 Años de su Fundación
- Encuentro de la Cultura Cubana /18 (2000); El rostro oculto de Miami
- Cuba: short stories (2002); Not the truth, not a lie (pg. 176-182)
- Cultura y Letras Cubanas en el Siglo XXI (2010); Distancia no quiere decir olvido : viajes a la semilla (pg. 203-214)

== Awards ==
- 1980–81 Cintas Fellowship for Literature
- 2016 International Latino Book Awards – Second place Best Novel - Historical Fiction – Spanish or Bilingual - The Memory of Silence
- 2021 Florida Book Awards – Spanish Language – Bronze: El reino de la infancia — Memorias de mi vida en Cuba
