= Rafael Consuegra =

Cuban-American artist (1941–2021)

- Born: September 16, 1941; Havana, Cuba
- Died: September 17, 2021 (aged 80); Miami Beach, Florida
- Known for: Sculpture, ceramics, painting, joie de vivre
- Partner: Esther Caro
- Children: Beatriz Consuegra (Betty Wright)
- Awards: CINTAS Award (1972, 1973), Miami Art Center’s Award for Sculpture (1967)

Rafael Consuegra (September 16, 1941 – September 17, 2021) was a Cuban-born American sculptor and ceramist who worked in the United States and Europe.

Consuegra was born in Havana, Cuba. He left the island in 1960 and established residence in Miami, Florida, where he began his studies in architecture and engineering. As an art student, he was twice granted the Cintas fellowship from the International Institute of Education in New York, and obtained a Master of Arts Degree from the University of Miami in 1971.

After teaching sculpture and design for a few years, Consuegra set his sights on creating, and established a studio in Barcelona. He quickly developed a reputation as a ceramist and sculptor, and exhibited widely throughout France, Spain, Denmark, Switzerland, Russia and Serbia. Upon his return to the US, he set up his primary studio in Miami, and spent over 30 years creating a large body work ranging in size from small-scale sculptures to monumental public art commissions. Represented in both private and public collections across the globe, his work explores the subjects of organic formations, abstract composition, law v. justice, the human body in motion, mythology, religion, the elevation of the human spirit, and freedom.

== Education ==
After relocating to the United States in the 1960s, Consuegra studied the arts in Miami Dade College with fellow artists Emilio Falero and Rafael Soriano, and received his associate degree in 1967. He then received a Master of Fine Arts Degree from the University of Miami in 1971. He later taught as an art instructor in both Miami Dade College and Barry University.

== Solo exhibitions ==
He has had multiple solo exhibitions in Miami, including shows at educational institutions such as Miami Dade College in 1970 and 2006, Barry University in 1971, and Florida International University in 1973. He did a show in Boston's Northeastern University in 2007 titled "Freedom Birds" and had other shows in Chicago, New York City, Athens, Georgia, and Puerto Rico. Internationally, he gave shows in Spain, France, Switzerland, Argentina, and Serbia.

== Group exhibitions ==
Consuegra also participated in several group exhibitions, including the International Artists Salon, Grenoble, France (1977), Forum Artis I, Copenhagen, Denmark (1978), WIZO Art ‘92’, Miami (1992), "Sculpture in the Landscape," University of Miami (1995), "31 Cuban Sculptors Exhibition," Miami Dade College (2009), "Art Shanghai 2012," "Art Fest at Doral" (2012), and the Miami River Art Fair (2012).

== Awards ==
Consuegra won several awards for his art, including the Miami Art Center's Award for Sculpture in 1967, the University of Miami's Hanson Award in 1968 and Helen Banks Memorial Award in 1969, the Cintas Foundation Fellowship (New York) in both 1972 and 1973, among others. In 2012 he was designated a U.S. Ambassador to promote Belgrade as a "Capital of the Arts" in 2020.

== Collections ==
Rafael Consuegra's work can be seen in the Lowe Art Museum of the University of Miami, and several noted Catholic institutions including the Agrupación Católica Universitaria of Miami, Belen Jesuit Preparatory School (for the Giants of Belen series), Saint Brendan Catholic School as well as many prominent Cuban art collections including the Permuy and Pinedo fine art collections.

Consuegra was commissioned to produce numerous public artworks, and won a nationwide competition to represent the United States in an arts exchange program between the sister cities, Duluth, Minnesota, and Petrozavodsk, Russia. His winning sculpture, The Fishermen, is located in Petrozavodsk and is symbolic in nature, with the two fishermen representing the unity of the two sister cities. He also produced sculptures for the Milander Recreational Complex of Hialeah that were installed in 2015. On January 28, 2020, Consuegra's sculpture MINOSO was erected in Optimist Park of Miami Lakes in honor of Cuban-American baseball player Minnie Minoso (1925–2015). In 2020 Consuegra was also commissioned by real estate developer and impact glass magnate Sam Moussa to create an abstract original metal sculpture for his private residence Aqua Azure.

== Style ==
Consuegra's sculptures are known for their dynamic elements that give a sense of motion to metal, his preferred medium. At times it is an industrial, mechanized dynamism; at others it is a fluid and organic dynamism. He describes this as an ability to "breathe life into metal." He also frequently uses color in his sculptures to enhance these features.

His painted work shows strong architectural influence and tends to be abstract and highly geometric. Across all mediums, Consuegra's art varies between levels of high and intermediate abstraction, occasionally with spiritual and religious subject matter, such as crucifixes and angels. Consuegra tends to initial his works with "RCC."

== Death and legacy ==
Consuegra died on September 17, 2021, one day following his 80th birthday, of a heart attack. Consuegra was a founder of the Bird Road Arts District (BRAD) in the 1980s, where his studio was among the first to establish itself before the area was officially designated an arts district. The architectural influences in Consuegras art was credited as a key factor in inspiring Ignacio Permuy to enter the architecture profession; the two would later collaborate on several projects and exhibitions. Consuegra was also a key figure in the Permuy Gallery, one of the first Cuban art galleries in the United States, and assisted the Permuys in preparing the venue for its launch.
