= Emilio Falero =

Cuban painter (born 1947)

- Born: 1947 (age 78–79); Sagua la Grande, Cuba
- Education: Studied under Juan Llera and Juan Luis Ruyan
- Known for: Painting

Emilio Falero (born 1947 in Sagua la Grande, Cuba) is a Cuban Fine Arts painter residing in Florida.

== Career ==
Emilio Falero was born in Sagua La Grande, Cuba in 1947. Falero began studying art under painters Juan Llera and Juan Luis Ruyan; their teaching included lessons in color theory and advanced readings on his own. He graduated from Belen Jesuit Preparatory in 1961 and subsequently emigrated to the United States in 1962 as a part of Operation Peter Pan following the events of the Cuban Revolution. Upon arriving to Miami, joined a wave of younger emerging Cuban artists who would become a prominent force in Cuban art, including Juan Gonzalez and Rafael Consuegra. Falero studied painting, sculpture, and ceramics with other prominent artists, such as Rafael Soriano, Rafael Consuegra, Duane Hanson and Mark Wethli, in Miami, Florida, between 1966 and 1969 graduating from Miami Dade Community College (North Campus, Miami), Florida in 1967, and later attended Barry College in North Miami, Florida, in 1969. Before then, Falero had attended and graduated from Belen Jesuit Preparatory in 1961.

Since graduating, he has gone on to achieve success in numerous high-profile exhibitions, win awards, and received praise from Cuban art scholars as well as significant media and literary coverage. He is a member of the Agrupación Católica Universitaria.

== Style ==
His work is known for its distinctly academic and intellectual approach, often with layered references to art history and theology. His common influences are rooted in Spanish art, especially Velazquez and Picasso, but also nods to others such as Caravaggio, Vermeer, and El Greco. He utilizes a high degree of technical skill to achieve his updated takes on Realism, Renaissance, and the Baroque. Falero has had phases nodding to more recent influential art movements of the twentieth century - such as Pop Art (i.e. Andy Warhol, George Segal), Surrealism, Modernism, and Postmodernism - while incorporating Latin American elements and other flourishes to reflect his Cuban background.

Art historian Dr. Lynette Bosch of the State University of New York says of Falero: "By drawing on imagery taken from a range of artistic styles and eras, he has blended the separate parts of his life into a united reality that reflects his diverse experience and faith."

== Exhibitions ==
=== Individual exhibitions ===
His most relevant solo shows include a 1974 exhibit at Inter-American Development Bank, Washington, D.C.; a 1974 exhibition at the Permuy Gallery in Coral Gables, Florida that led to a subsequent 1976 solo exhibition; a 1979 solo exhibit titled Emilio Falero. Paintings, Drawings and Works in Progress at the Forma Gallery in Coral Gables, Florida; the 1986 Correlations/Inversions: Recent Works by Emilio Falero show at the Acanthus Gallery in Coral Gables, Florida, and the 1987 Emilio Falero and Miguel Padura: Realism for the 1980s show at the Miami-Dade Public Library System's celebration of the 15th Annual Hispanic Heritage Month. The show was held at the West Dade Regional Library, Miami, Florida.

=== Collective exhibitions ===
Emilio has formed part of many collective exhibitions, such as the 1969 group show at Miami Dade Community College, North Campus, Miami, Florida; the 1976 exhibit at 18th Annual Hortt Memorial Exhibition at the Fort Lauderdale Museum of Art in Fort Lauderdale, Florida; the renown 1983 Miami Generation Exhibition; the 1988 Cintas Fellows Revisited: A Decade After show held at the Main Library, Metro Dade Cultural Center in Miami, Florida, and the noted 1997 group show titled Breaking Barriers: Selections from the Museum of Art’s Permanent Contemporary Cuban Collection also at the Fort Lauderdale Museum of Art in Fort Lauderdale, Florida.

== Recognition and collections ==
Emilio Falero is highly regarded in Cuban art circles, particularly by scholars. He has been prominently featured in numerous books on the subject, including Cuban-American Art in Miami: Exile, Identity and the Neo-Baroque (2004) and Outside Cuba: Contemporary Cuban Visual Artists (1989). Falero has won several awards for his artwork, including the Cintas Foundation Fellowship (1978), New York; the Ziuta and Joseph James Akston Foundation Award at the 38th Annual Exhibition of Contemporary American Art Painting; The Society of Four Arts, Palm Beach, Florida. He has been profiled numerous times in media and recognized by many curators, gallery owners and prominent art critics as a leading artistic component of the Cuban American art scene for more than five decades. Noted Cuban art critic and scholar Giulio V. Blanc said Falero "takes art [history] out of context", "plays tricks with reality" and "goes beyond the superficial differences" to make deeper revelations.

His work can be found in numerous Cuban art collections such as the Agrupación Católica Universitaria, Miami, Florida; the Cintas Foundation Inc., New York City; the Lowe Art Museum, University of Miami, Coral Gables, Florida; the Metropolitan Museum and Art Center, Miami, Florida; Saladrigas Art Gallery, Belen Jesuit Preparatory School, Miami, Florida; and the Miami-Dade Public Library System, Miami, Florida.
