= Cuban migration to Miami =

Aspect of Cuban-American history

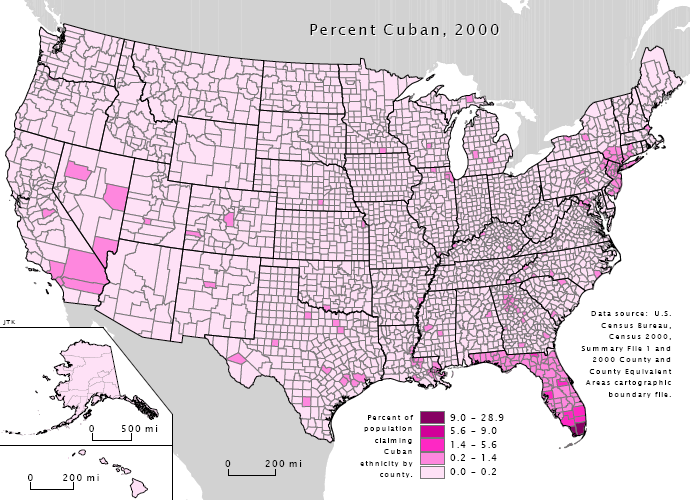
The 2000 U.S. census data on the Cuban population in the United States.

Cuban immigration has greatly affected Miami-Dade County since 1959, creating what is known as "Cuban Miami." However, Miami reflects global trends as well, such as the growing trends of multiculturalism and multiracialism; this reflects the way in which international politics shape local communities.

About 500,000 Cubans, many of them businessmen and professionals, arrived in Miami during a 15-year period after the 1959 Cuban Revolution. Some figures in Fulgencio Batista's administration were among those who arrived in Miami. The Miami Cubans received assimilation aid from the federal government. Some of the new Cuban immigrants established businesses in Miami. The Cubans arriving after 1980 immigrated primarily for economic reasons. In 1960, the Hispanic population in Miami was 50,000; in 1980, the Hispanic population grew to 580,000. Cubans were the main source of this Hispanic growth in the city, as many Cubans came to Miami at the time due to Cuba's poor economy and high poverty rate, as well as the dictatorship of Fidel Castro at the time. The coexistence of growth and internationalization within Miami-Dade County has perpetuated an ethnically driven social polarization. The growing number of Cubans in the county have remained loyal to their cultural norms, mores, customs, language, and religious affiliations. The transnational force of immigration defines Miami as a growing metropolis, and the 20th century Cuban influx has greatly affected Miami's growth.

As of 2012, there were 1.2 million people of Cuban heritage in Greater Miami, most of whom lived in Miami-Dade County. As of that year, about 400,000 had arrived after 1980. In a 2022 estimate, Greater Miami, showed a slight decrease to about 1,112,592. As of the 2020 census, there were 129,896 Cuban Americans living inside Miami city limits, representing about 29.3% of Miami and nearly half of the city's Hispanic/Latino population. Many Miami suburbs like Hialeah, and many others especially in southern Miami-Dade county, are majority Cuban.

== History ==
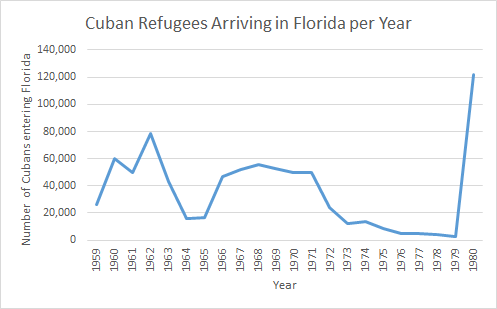
Chart showing history of Cuban refugees arriving in Florida.

=== Early migration (1800s - 1958) ===
Due to Miami's geographic proximity to Cuba it served as an easy location to migrate to for Cubans who were dissatisfied with poverty, or the various military dictatorships in Cuba. Many affluent Cuban families also sent their children to school in the United States, usually in Miami. Various Cuban political leaders used Miami as a base of operations to organize against the Fulgencio Batista regime.

By 1958 only about 10,000 Cubans lived in Miami, although affluent Cubans would often visit Miami for tourism and shopping. The tourist industry in Miami catered to Cuban visitors and tried to offer as many services in Spanish as possible.

=== First wave of Cuban exiles (1959–1973) ===
After the Cuban Revolution of 1959 large numbers of Cubans began to emigrate. Cubans settled in various places around the United States, but the majority settled in Miami-Dade County due to its proximity to Cuba and the Cuban community already present in the area. Many settled in the Miami neighborhood of Little Havana and the suburb of Hialeah, where they found cheap housing, new jobs, and access to Spanish-speaking businesses.

As Cubans became more settled in Miami-Dade County, more businesses and media outlets began catering to Spanish speaking audiences. Large numbers of non-Hispanic residents began to leave the county in a case of white flight, with many of them moving to Broward County and Palm Beach County.

Cuban immigration greatly affected Miami's future demographics. For example, the net immigration of African Americans into Miami was reduced during the 1960s in comparison to previous years. This was the result of Cuban immigrants competing for jobs that had often been afforded to African Americans living in Miami. This reduction of immigration of non-Hispanics displayed the growing presence of Cubans in Miami. Miami "posts a low emigration rate-43.6 per 1,000. This, of course, stems from the huge Cuban presence in Dade County and is testimony to the holding power of the Cuban enclave in Miami".

=== Later exiles and migrants (1974–present) ===
In 1980 many Cubans arrived in the United States due to the Mariel boatlift. But other Cubans already in the United States began to enter south Florida. Miami posted an in-migration of 35,776 Cubans from elsewhere in the United States between 1985 and 1990 and an emigration of 21,231, mostly to elsewhere in Florida. Flows to and from Miami account for 52 percent of all interregional migration in the Cuban settlement system". As of 2024, 60% of Miami- Dade County is estimated to be of Cuban origin.

Cubans continued to come to the United States and specifically Miami-Dade County, especially during the 1994 Cuban rafter crisis and beyond. As Cubans continued to immigrate and become more settled in American society, many Cuban-owned businesses began to prosper in the Miami area. Early arrivals drew on professional and entrepreneurial skills brought from Cuba, and informal lending networks, including character loans such as those issued by Cuban banker Luis Botifoll at the Republican Bank, which allowed many to start small businesses despite arriving with little capital. By the 1980s, Cuban Americans owned thousands of businesses in Miami-Dade County, spanning manufacturing, retail, construction, and finance.

The population of Cuban Americans has experienced a surge in growth once again with the arrival of the 2021–23 Cuban migration wave to the United States. In fiscal year 2021, 39,303 Cuban migrants and asylum seekers were encountered at the US border. In Fiscal year 2022, this increased by 471% over 2021 to 224,607. In In fiscal year 2023, 208,308 Cuban refugees were encountered seeking asylum.

== Culture ==
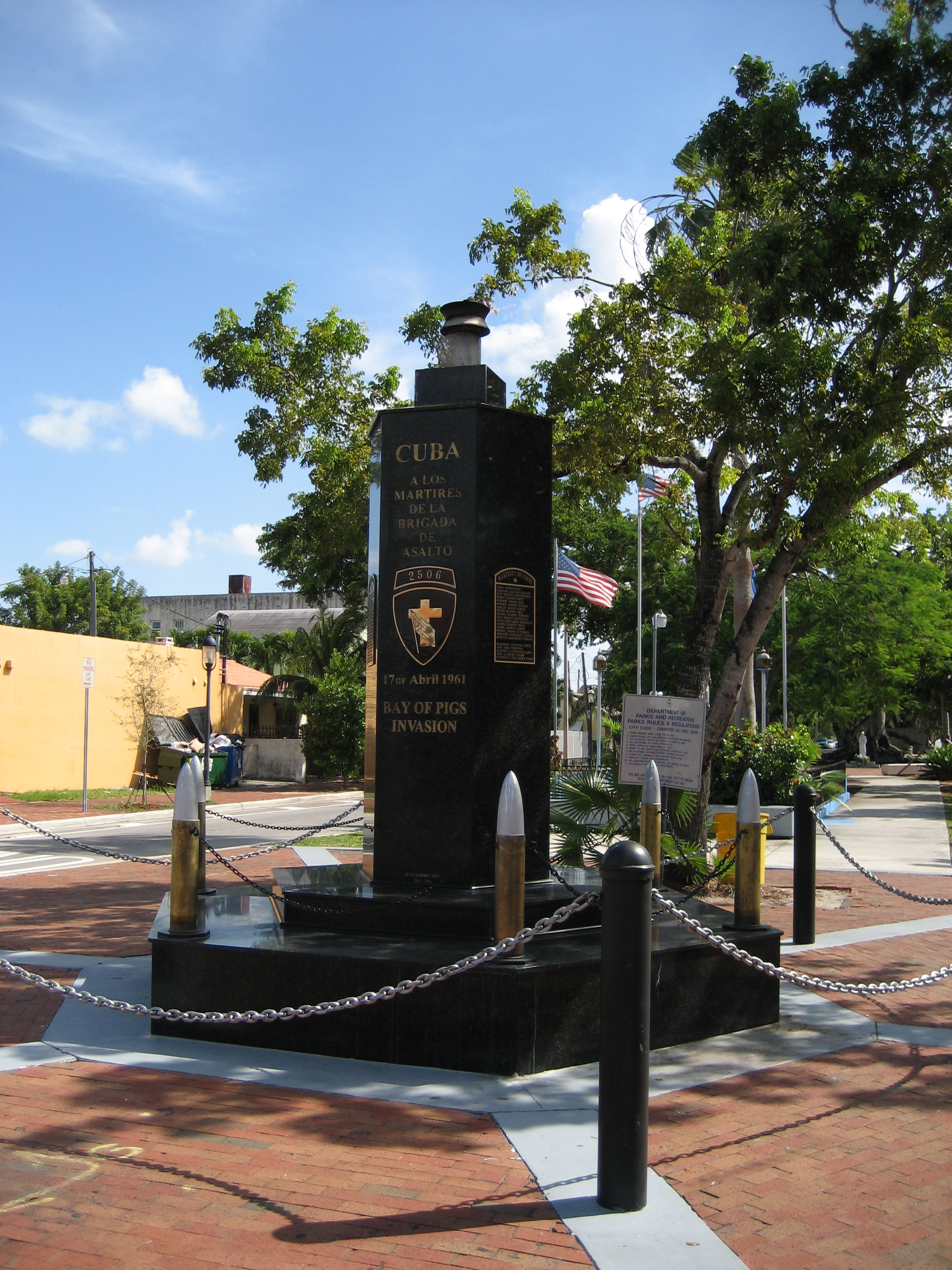
The Bay of Pigs Memorial in Little Havana, Miami

=== Language ===
With the emerging importance of ethnicity and the increased effects of segregation, Cubans within Miami attempted to maintain their Spanish language. In Miami, the Spanish language was spoken to a larger extent than in other cities with large Hispanic populations; also it was spoken in more diverse settings in Miami than any other city. The 1970 census revealed that Spanish speakers made up 24 percent of Miami's population. The Spanish language was becoming a norm in Miami as it was more extensively spoken by Miami's Cuban elite. Language became increasingly important in 20th-century Miami as a result of the Cuban influx and this had impacts on the non-Hispanic population.

Non-Hispanic communities began to oppose the rise of the Spanish language as a growing force within Miami. This can be seen in the anti-bilingualism/English Only movement. This movement came about in 1980, after a long period of vast Cuban immigration and social reform. Language was becoming a pressing issue as "Miami had the first bilingual public school program in the modern period (1963) and the first English Only referendum (1980)". In fact the debates of English as Dade County's official language led to violent and dangerous riots in the 1980s. Cubans felt that by preserving their language, they were preserving a fundamental component of their culture. In the 2000 census, 59.2% of people in Miami-Dade County said that they spoke Spanish at home.

=== Media ===
Although the media in Miami allows a certain amount of cultural labeling to flourish within the community, it also portrays the growing importance and domination of Cuban immigrants. For example, the Miami Herald's June 14, 1996, headline reads "Vanishing Spanish". The headline refers to, and deplores the fact that, only a small percentage of recent high school graduates were fluent in Spanish; whereas the majority of second-generation Cuban immigrants spoke broken Spanish, and only spoke it in the home. "This was described as an alarming trend since it erodes Miami's advantage as a bilingual community and diminishes its economic competitiveness". During the 20th century, many Spanish-language newspapers were founded in Miami. "The Miami Herald created a Spanish-language insert, el Nuevo Herald, in 1976". This addition received a vast amount of support and "by 1981 circulation reached 83,000 on weekdays and 94,000 for weekend editions. el Nuevo Herald is now published as an independent newspaper and reports a weekday circulation of about 100,000. It too is accessible on the World Wide Web (http://www.elnuevoherald.com). As the Hispanic population has grown and achieved considerable economic success, it has also moved beyond Miami's city limits: Spanish-language newspapers are now published in adjacent Hialeah and Fort Lauderdale. This expansion can be seen at a statewide level as well, for Tampa, Orlando, and Immokalee each have Spanish-language newspapers". Essentially, through the founding and growth of distinctly Hispanic newspapers, Cuban immigrants established a distinctly Latin American media.

=== Politics ===
The Cubans arriving after 1980 have closer ties to those remaining in Cuba. They tend to take charter flights to and from Miami to Cuba.

In 2016, Hillary Clinton performed better than Barack Obama in several heavily Cuban American neighborhoods.

In Miami-Dade County, in the 2020 election, Cuban Americans tended to vote for President Donald Trump in spite of rhetoric perceived as offensive to Latin Americans. Residents of Cuban descent often had an antagonism against progressive movements due to a perceived association with the socialist politics of Fidel Castro and other anti-communist sentiments. Trump sought to attract Cuban American voters by implementing policies hostile to the Cuban regime. The courting of Miami Cubans, including those who had recently arrived in the U.S. and those who are of younger demographics, contributed to Trump winning Florida's electoral votes. Miami-Dade County nevertheless voted for Joe Biden, but the margin of victory for the Democrats was lower than in the previous few election cycles.

Leading up the 2024 election, more than two-thirds of likely Cuban American voters in Miami-Dade County planned to vote for Trump, voicing support for his deportation policies and opposition to liberal Democrats.

=== Parks and recreation ===
As common meeting places, several parks in the greater Miami area reflect the influence of Cuban migration to the community and nod to Cuban culture.

Starting in the early 1970s, community leader and urban planner Jesús Permuy spearheaded the effort to designate a park for the Cuban exile community. The sometimes controversial proposed park was known for much of the almost ten-year effort simply as the "Latin Park," and faced some pushback from non-Cuban residents. The park was unanimously approved by the Miami City Commission, however, and finally opened in 1980 as José Martí Park in honor of Cuban icon José Martí.

== See also ==
- Operation Peter Pan, 1960–1962
- Hispanic and Latino Americans in Florida
- Immigration to the United States
- El Nuevo Herald, a Spanish-language supplement to The Miami Herald
- Wet feet, dry feet policy
- Cuban-American lobby
- Floridanos
