= Oscar B. Cintas =

Oscar Benjamin Cintas y Rodriguez (31 Mar 1887 in Sagua la Grande, Cuba – 11 May 1957 in New York City, N.Y.) was a prominent sugar and railroad magnate who served as Cuba's ambassador to the United States from 1932 until 1934.

== Career ==
He was educated in London and became director of the Cuban Railroad Company's sugar mills in Punta Alegre, Jatibonico and Jobabo. He was president of Railroad Equipment of Brazil and Argentina, director of the American Car and Foundry Company and the American Locomotive Company and had business interests in Europe.

=== Collector ===
As a patron of the arts and with the advice of the legendary Alfred H. Barr Jr., Cintas assembled a collection of Old Masters and modern paintings that was once considered among the best in Latin America. In 1940, he lent one of the pieces from the collection, Rembrandt's Portrait of a Rabbi on a Wide Cap, to the "Masterpieces of Art" exhibition at the New York World's Fair.

Bliss Copy
Cintas also collected manuscripts and his acquisitions included the only first edition of Miguel de Cervantes' Don Quixote, and the fifth and final manuscript of Abraham Lincoln's "Gettysburg Address", once owned by the family of Col. Alexander Bliss, and known as the "Bliss copy". Cintas’ purchase of the manuscript, for $54,000, in 1949, set a record at the time for the sale of a document at a public auction. Cintas' properties were claimed by the Castro government after the Cuban Revolution in 1959, but Cintas, who died in 1957, willed the Gettysburg Address to the American people, provided it was kept at the White House, to where it was transferred in 1959. The manuscript, the only one to which Lincoln added his signature, is exhibited in the Lincoln Bedroom of the White House.

=== Death and estate ===
Before his death, Cintas entrusted the administration of his estate, including his art collection, to The Chase Manhattan Bank, N.A., with Ethan Alyea serving as legal counsel. With the help and encouragement of David Rockefeller, Alyea named a blue ribbon board of trustees to carry out Cintas’ wishes for a foundation. Early members of the board included Theodore Rousseau (curator of the Metropolitan Museum of Art), Porter A. McCray (director of the International Program at New York's Museum of Modern Art) and A. Hyatt Mayor (curator of prints at the Metropolitan Museum of Art).

== CINTAS Foundation ==
The foundation's original name, the Cuban Art Foundation, was changed in 1962 to honor its founder. The Cintas' legacy has fostered the development of Cuban artists, promoting the professional development of these artists and the continuity of Cuban traditions in art. Cintas' foresight has resulted in more than 300 fellowships and grants to creative writers, architects, composers, visual artists and filmmakers, many of whom have later achieved national and international renown.

In addition to the fellowships, the CINTAS Foundation oversees two major art collections in the United States and sponsors exhibitions curated from these collections. The CINTAS Fellows collection is composed of works donated by the fellows in appreciation of the CINTAS fellowship. It has grown to be the largest body of Cuban art outside Cuba and continues to grow regularly.

The CINTAS Foundation awards fellowships annually to creative artists of Cuban lineage.

The CINTAS Foundation was established with funds from the estate of Cintas. CINTAS Fellowships acknowledge demonstrated creative accomplishments and encourage the development of creative artists in architecture, literature, music composition and the visual arts. Past recipients include the Pulitzer Prize–winning novelist Oscar Hijuelos, author and scholar Uva de Aragón, the playwright Maria Irene Fornes, painters Carlos Alfonzo and Emilio Falero, the photographer Andres Serrano, the architect Andrés Duany, the poet Silvia Curbelo, sculptors María Elena González and Rafael Consuegra, as well as the composer Orlando Garcia.
