= Pablo Cano =

- Born: Pablo Daniel Cano Fernández; March 11, 1961 (age 65); Cuba
- Occupation: Artist
- Parent(s): Margarita Cano (artist); Pablo Benigno Cano Diago

Pablo Daniel Cano Fernández (born March 11, 1961, in Havana, Cuba) is a Miami-based artist. He creates marionettes which he uses in performances and exhibits as sculptures.

== Selected solo exhibitions ==
- "Pablo Cano: Pupil Progress" at the Meeting Point Art Center, Coral Gables, Florida (1980)
- "Project Saussaies Vernissage", Paris, France (1983)
- "Animated Altarpieces", Master of Fine Art Exhibition Queens College, New York City (1986)
- "The Pursuit of Love", Nye Gómez Gallery, Baltimore, Maryland, U.S.A (1992).
- "Puppet theatre", Young At Art Museum, Davie, Florida, U.S.A (2011).
- "Pablo Cano - To The Eye Behind The Keyhole" Retrospective 1979 - 2016, Main Public Library, Miami, Fl (2016)

== Collections ==
Cano's work is held in the collections of the Cintas Foundation. His work is also part of permanent collections of The Lowe Art Museum University of Miami, Florida, the NSU Museum of Art, Fort Lauderdale, Florida, The Perez Art Museum Miami, Florida, The Young At Art Museum, Davie, Florida, Museum of Contemporary Art, North Miami, Florida.

== Awards ==
- Best in Show, Wolfson Campus, Miami Dade Community College, Miami, Florida, U.S.A, 1979.
- Channel 2 Art Auction Award, Miami, Florida, U.S.A, 1980
- Cintas Foundation Fellowship, New York, U.S.A, 1983–1984

Miami Dade College Hall of Fame Award 2005
