= Lynette Bosch =

American art historian

- Other name: Lynette M.F. Bosch
- Education: Princeton University
- Scientific career
- Thesis: Manuscript illumination in Toledo (1446-1495) : the liturgical books (1985)

Lynette M. de F. Bosch is an art historian who specializes in the Italian and Spanish Renaissance, as well as modern Latin American and Cuban art. She was named a distinguished professor at State University of New York at Geneseo in 2016.

== Education and career ==
Bosch received a B.A. in art history from Queens College in 1975 and an M.A. from Hunter College in 1978. In 1985 she earned a Ph.D. from Princeton University. From 1990 until 1992 Bosch was an assistant professor at the State University of New York at Cortland, at which point she moved to Brandeis University where she remained until 1998. In 1999 she moved to the State University of New York at Geneseo as an assistant professor, and she was promoted to full professor in 2005. In 2016 she was named a distinguished professor.

Bosch's primary areas of expertise are the Italian Renaissance, Italian Mannerism, and Latin American works of the 20th and 21st centuries, particularly Cuban-American, Mexican, and Chilean painters.

== Selected publications ==
- Bosch, Lynette M. F. (1996). Ernesto Barreda, 1946-1996. Santiago, Chile. ISBN 978-956-272-532-3.
- Bosch, Lynette M. F. (2000). Art, Liturgy, and Legend in Renaissance Toledo. University Park, Pa: Penn State Press. ISBN 978-0-271-01968-0.
- Gracia, Jorge J. E.; Bosch, Lynette M. F.; Borland, Isabel Alvarez (2009-01-08). Identity, Memory, and Diaspora. SUNY Press. ISBN 978-0-7914-7318-4.
- Borland, Isabel Alvarez; Bosch, Lynette M. F. (2010-01-01). Cuban-American Literature and Art. Albany: SUNY Press. ISBN 978-0-7914-9374-8.
- BOSCH, LYNETTE M. F. (2023). Mannerism, Spirituality and Cognition. Routledge. ISBN 978-1-032-56987-1.
