= Agrupación Católica Universitaria =

Christian life community in Florida, US

The Agrupación Católica Universitaria (ACU - Catholic University Group) is a prominent Christian life community (CVX-CLC) composed of professional Catholic men. It is based in Miami, Florida.

== Background ==
The group officially began in Havana, Cuba in 1926, though its groundwork was laid throughout the 1920s. It was founded by Felipe Rey de Castro, a Spaniard Jesuit and professor in the prestigious "Palace of Education" Belen Jesuit Preparatory School founded by Queen Isabela II of Spain. The ACU has therefore maintained close ties with both the Society of Jesus and Belen Jesuit from its inception with many alumni and instructors serving as members.

Following the rise of the Castro regime with the Cuban Revolution and its anti-religion policies, the organization relocated to the United States in the 1960s where it began in Miami and has since spread to other cities.

The ACU has been mentioned in several books, including Presencia en Cuba del catolicismo apuntes históricos del siglo veinte (1998) and ¡Presente!: U.S. Latino Catholics from Colonial Origins to the Present (2015) and the subject of the 2020 book History of the Agrupacion Catolica Universitaria.

=== Leadership ===
ACU's first two directors were Spaniard Jesuits residing in Cuba. The organization's founder, Fr. Rey de Castro, led the ACU from the 1920s until his death in 1952. He was followed as director by Fr. Armando Llorente, S.J., who led the ACU for nearly sixty years. Llorente became a high-profile figure in the broader Cuban Catholic community and oversaw the group's migration from Cuba to the United States, leading it in Miami through the later half of the 20th century and the start of the 21st century until his death in 2010. He was also noted for having taught Fidel Castro in Belen Jesuit. In a 2015 visit to the island, Pope Francis gifted Castro a book on Llorente.

Though not a director, another important ACU leader during the lead-up of the Cuban Revolution was the prominent Cuban psychiatrist Rene de la Huerta, who continued to be an active figure and writer for the group following their relocation to the United States.

In 2010 Fr. Armando Llorente, S.J., was followed by Belen Jesuit President Fr. Guillermo García-Tuñón, S.J., until its current director, Fr. Christian Saenz, S.J. (another Belen Jesuit alumnus), assumed the role in 2019. García-Tuñón is now serving as Assistant Ecclesiastical Director and Erik Viera is their Pastoral Administrator.

=== Members ===
Members of the Agrupación Católica Universitaria are known as "Agrupados" or "Congregantes." ACU membership is largely composed of educated Catholic South Florida leaders of various professions with the intent of facilitating Christian service in service their communtiees. Their affiliate site through Belen Jesuit states that the ACU's goals for their members are "to fulfill man's purpose in life through individual perfection, conceived as apostolic action executed within one's own intellectual means, in order to occupy an influential position of true spiritual leadership. Such leadership is sought to influence decisions made in society, so that society may be brought into accordance with the path that will lead it to God." ACU members include prominent and leading doctors, philosophers, bankers, attorneys, architects, artists, and engineers.

It is a Marian Congregation (CM) rooted in and guided by Jesuit principals and practices, such as the Spiritual Exercises of Saint Ignatius of Loyola. Their philosophy calls for the balance and development of "spiritual life, professional life, and apostolic life" and their official motto is "Esto Vir" ("To be courageous/To be a man").

Though largely based in Miami, there are also ACU Houses in Washington D.C., Atlanta, and Puerto Rico.
