= El Nuevo Herald =

Daily Spanish-language newspaper in Miami, Florida

Coordinates: 25.806981°N 80.344189°W

el Nuevo Herald
- Type: Daily newspaper
- Format: Broadsheet
- Owner: The McClatchy Company
- President: Nancy A. Meyer
- Founded: 1977 (as El Herald)
- Language: Spanish
- Headquarters: Doral, Florida, USA
- Circulation: 42,069 daily 59,617 Sunday (as of 2015)
- ISSN: 2688-8785
- OCLC number: 17427907
- Website: www.elnuevoherald.com

El Nuevo Herald is a newspaper published daily in Spanish in Southeast Florida, United States. The newspaper is headquartered in Doral, and its primary audience is the Spanish-speaking population of South Florida. El Nuevo Herald's sister paper is the Miami Herald, and both are published by McClatchy.

== About el Nuevo Herald ==
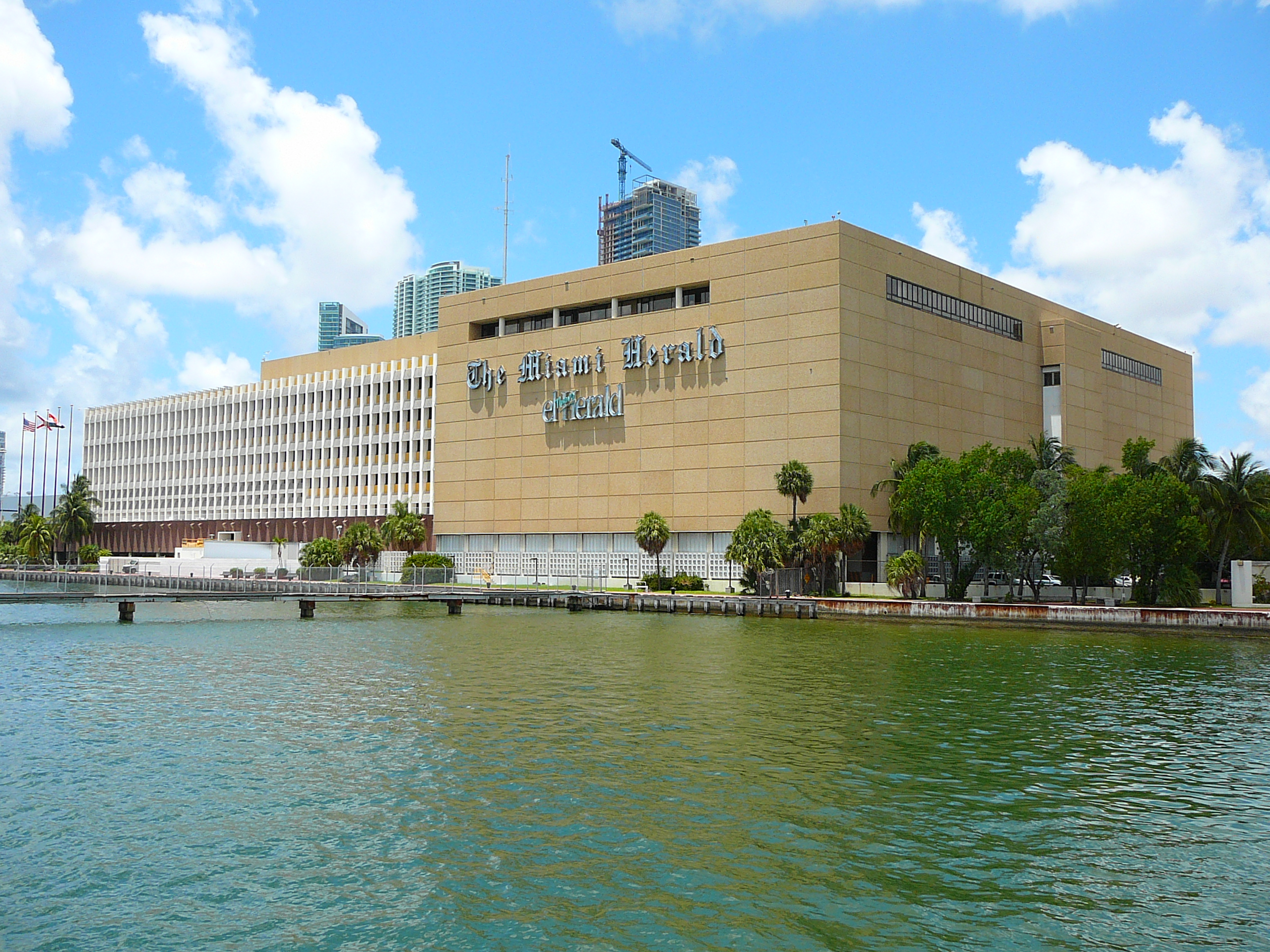
The former Miami Herald and el Nuevo Herald building, which has been sold for redevelopment.

Founded: First published in 1977 as El Miami Herald; expanded and relaunched in 1987 as el Nuevo Herald, available as a standalone newspaper in 1998.
Key executives:
Nancy A. Meyer, President, Miami Herald Media Company
Monica R. Richardson, Executive Editor
Distinction: Award-winning, Spanish-language daily newspaper in the nation's third-largest Hispanic market.
Circulation Area: Miami-Dade and Broward counties.
Market: The South Florida market is the primary market in the state of Florida with nearly 4.3 million residents and ranks as the 15th largest in the United States. It is the third-largest Hispanic market in the nation.
Strength:
Of daily newspapers, el Nuevo Herald is the United States' biggest Spanish-language Sunday paper (68,781) and the second-largest daily (53,924). El Nuevo Herald carries an extraordinary sphere of influence in Latin America and the Caribbean for its groundbreaking news.
Customers: Hispanic readers in South Florida, the Caribbean and Latin America; web visitors from around the world.

== Government-paid journalists ==
On September 8, 2006, the publisher of the Miami Herald, Jesús Díaz Jr., fired three Nuevo Herald journalists – Pablo Alfonso, Wilfredo Cancio Isla and Olga Connor – because they freelanced for Radio/TV Marti, a U.S. Government news agency. Less than a month later, Díaz was instructed by his superiors at The McClatchy Company, the parent company of the Miami Herald and el Nuevo Herald, to re-hire the three journalists because they had prior approval to freelance for Radio/TV Marti from their supervisor at the time, el Nuevo Herald executive editor Humberto Castelló. Díaz resigned after reinstating the fired journalists.

== See also ==
- Al Día
- El Día
- La Opinión
- La Voz de Houston
- List of newspapers in Florida
