= Bill Gaede =

Argentine engineer and programmer (born 1952)

- Born: November 19, 1952 (age 73); Lanús, Buenos Aires, Argentina
- Occupations: Engineer, author

Guillermo "Bill" Gaede (born November 19, 1952) is an Argentine engineer and programmer who is best known for Cold War industrial spying on behalf of Cuba, Iran, and China conducted while he worked at Advanced Micro Devices (AMD) and Intel Corporation (Intel). While at AMD, he provided the Cuban government with technical information from the semiconductor industry, which the Cubans passed on to the Soviet bloc, primarily to the Soviet Union and East Germany. In 1992, Gaede turned himself over to the Central Intelligence Agency (CIA), which placed him in contact with the Federal Bureau of Investigation (FBI). The FBI began working with Gaede in a counter-espionage operation intended to penetrate Cuban intelligence using his contacts on the island. During this time, Gaede obtained work at Intel Corp. in Chandler, Arizona. Intel Security discovered the nature of his activities at AMD and terminated him, but not before Gaede filmed Intel's state-of-the-art Pentium process from home.

Gaede fled with this technology to South America, where he allegedly sold the information to Chinese and Iranian representatives. Upon his return to the United States, Gaede was arrested, prosecuted, and convicted. He was convicted and sentenced to 33 months in prison in June 1996, after which he was deported. The 9th Circuit Court rejected Gaede's appeal, and the Supreme Court denied certiorari.

Gaede later wrote a critique of mathematical physics and the usage of the scientific method in the disciplines of physics, biology, anthropology, and palaeontology according to his interpretations. Gaede's theories have mainly been proliferated via the Internet.

== Early years ==
Gaede was born in Lanús, Buenos Aires Province, Argentina, the third of four siblings of Gunther and Wiera Gaede. The Gaedes migrated to Rockford, Illinois, in 1959, but returned to Argentina in 1965 disillusioned with their experience in the United States. Although from a Peronist background, Gaede joined the Communist Party of Argentina at the age of 21 while serving as a steward of FOETRA, the union of the state-owned telephone company ENTel. After his application for a Cuban resident visa was turned down, he re-entered the United States in 1977, this time as a tourist. In the U.S., Gaede worked under the alias Ricardo Monares at Caron International in Rochelle, Illinois.

== Working at AMD and connection with Cuba ==
Gaede moved to California and started working at AMD in Sunnyvale in September 1979. By 1982, he had strived to become a process engineer. Still faithful to his socialistic principles, Gaede began to gather technical information from AMD, which he offered to the Cubans in one of his trips to Buenos Aires.

In 1986, Gaede was transferred to AMD's plant in Austin, Texas. This move enabled Gaede to take material in the trunk of his car and deliver the technology to Cuban agents on the Mexican side of the border. Gaede was so successful in this clandestine operation that Fidel Castro arranged to meet him in person in Havana at the end of 1988. Gaede eventually traveled in 1990, but by then had become disenchanted with communism. The entire Soviet bloc had disintegrated during 1989.

== CIA and FBI involvement ==
At the urging of renegade Cuban agents, Gaede turned himself over to the CIA on July 13, 1992. The FBI interrogated Gaede in September 1992 and began to use him in a counter-intelligence operation against Cuba. The FBI admitted reimbursing Gaede $607.16 for "expenses incurred in connection with a counterintelligence matter." The plan consisted of taking advantage of Gaede's intelligence contacts on the island.

== Gaede and Intel ==
While under FBI supervision, Gaede obtained a job as a programmer at the Intel chip plant in Chandler, Arizona. The FBI alleges that it alerted Intel of Gaede's background. Intel flatly denies the allegation, stating that had the company known of Gaede's background, "It is safe to say that Gaede would not have been hired."

Intel terminated Gaede's employment in June 1994. However, before Gaede was fired, he managed to film the entire Pentium process database from his home, ironically, using a terminal provided by Intel. He placed a camera and filmed the specs as they rolled on the screen. Shortly after, Gaede fled to South America and began to peddle the technology through the embassies of China and Iran. He allegedly counseled and trained Chinese and Iranian engineers in American manufacturing processes. Gaede was arrested by Argentine authorities as he attempted to bury tapes and documents. He was subsequently interrogated by the Secretaría de Inteligencia (SIDE) and the CIA in Buenos Aires.

Intel security manager Steve Lund arranged to meet Gaede in Argentina at the Sheraton Hotel on May 14, 1995. During their meeting, Gaede admitted to Lund to having stolen AMD material and equipment and given it to the Cubans. He also admitted to taking Intel's Pentium process and providing it to foreign countries. Intel alleged, further, that Gaede sent a video of the Pentium technology he copied to rival AMD.

As a result of these acts, Intel filed a civil complaint against Gaede in Argentina and criminal charges in the U.S. District Court in San Jose, California. Gaede denied the charge of sending tapes to AMD and accused the CIA of framing him.

== Return to the United States, arrest, conviction and deportation ==
Gaede returned to the United States in June 1995 and was arrested by the FBI on September 23. He represented himself in court and changed his plea after reaching an agreement with federal prosecutors. The agreement included a clause advising against deportation despite that Gaede was known to be in the country illegally. The Immigration and Naturalization Service (INS) proceeded to process Gaede for removal despite the recommendation. Initially, Gaede prevailed in his deportation case, but the government appealed. The case was remanded, and Gaede was subsequently deported.

== The Industrial Espionage Act of 1996 ==
During Gaede's prosecution, AMD, the FBI, the U.S. Attorney, and all affected parties complained that there were no laws to prosecute cases such as his. Shortly after Gaede's plea, the United States Congress enacted the Industrial Espionage Act of 1996, legislation that would soon be used to prosecute activities of the type Gaede was involved in.

== Charges against him ==
1. National Stolen Property Act – US Code Title 18 Section 2314
2. Mail Fraud – US Code Title 18 Section 1341

== Accusations against José Cohen Valdés and the Cuban government ==
Gaede created some controversy in the Cuban exile community in July 2009 by publicly accusing Miami businessman and ex-DGI (Cuban Intelligence Directorate) Captain José (Pepe) Cohen Valdés of working under the supervision of the Cuban government while on the island. Gaede claims that the American intelligence agencies never recruited Cohen because they did not believe Cohen to be credible. Gaede further accuses Cohen of deliberately misinforming the American intelligence agencies by channeling false information through him to the CIA and of betraying both him and their comrade in arms, Rolando Sarraff Trujillo, sentenced to 25 years in prison for espionage in Cuba after Cohen's defection. Gaede accuses the Cuban government of masterminding a counter-espionage operation against the U.S. that revolved around Cohen and his commander, Major Onelio Beovides. Cohen denies the charges.

== Critique of mathematical physics ==
In 1997, Gaede developed a critique of mathematical physics which was centred upon the semantic issues of the popular presentations of general relativity, quantum mechanics, and string theory. On February 20, 1998, Gaede completed his critique in book form, along with a theory of light, magnetism and gravity developed as a recreated model of physics in light of his deconstruction of the old models. His model is known as the rope hypothesis. This book remained unpublished until 2008, under the title Why God Doesn't Exist, with his major contention being that mathematical physics constitutes a religion and also a possible premise for arguments relating to the existence of God. The vast array of his arguments revolve around the fallacy of reification, or misplaced concreteness. Gaede claims that all theories of mathematical physics use abstract concepts as physical objects acting in reality. "Forces", "waves", "points", "fields", and so on, are not physical, but conceptual, according to Gaede.

== El Crazy Che ==
A documentary titled El Crazy Che was released at the Buenos Aires International Festival on April 17, 2015. This biographical movie narrates Gaede's spying activities in favor of Cuba, Iran and China. Gaede says he turned Rolando Sarraff Trujillo over to the Cuban authorities in 1994 by mailing a letter to the Cuban Intelligence Directorate. According to Gaede, Sarraff Trujillo had no bearing on the identification of Ana Montes. The United States exchanged the remaining members of the Cuban Five for Sarraff Trujillo during the Cuban Thaw because the Government regarded Alan Gross to be a hostage.

El Crazy Che was available on Netflix as of October 15, 2017.

Nowadays El Crazy Che is available on Amazon Prime, TubiTv, and other streaming platforms.
