= Rolando Sarraff Trujillo =

Cuban intelligence officer (born 1963)

- Born: August 22, 1963 (age 62)
- Other name: Roly
- Occupation: official in Cuban secret service
- Known for: Spied for the USA against Cuban government

Rolando Sarraff Trujillo (born 22 August 1963) is a Cuban intelligence officer who was convicted for espionage for the United States Central Intelligence Agency.

Sarraff worked for the Cuban Directorate of Intelligence in Havana and acted as a mole, providing classified information on Cuban spies in the United States to the CIA. He was arrested by the Cuban authorities in November 1995, and sentenced to 25 years. He was released to the United States in a prisoner swap on December 18, 2014, coinciding with a thaw in diplomatic relations between the two countries.

== Family and education ==
Sarraff's parents are Rolando Sarraff Elías and Odesa Trujillo, both living in Havana. Sarraff Trujillo has a son who was seven years old when his father was arrested. Rolando's two sisters, Vilma and Katia, left Cuba and emigrated to Spain shortly after their brother's arrest. There are conflicting reports on the parents' professional backgrounds: Reuters reported Sarraff Elías had risen to the rank of lieutenant colonel (in the Cuban armed forces), but that both he and his wife were retired journalists. According to the Spanish newspaper ABC, both parents are retired intelligence officers who had attended a KGB academy.

From 1985 until 1990 Sarraff Trujillo attended the University of Havana, where he earned a degree in journalism before joining the Interior Ministry.

== Intelligence activities ==
Sarraff worked for the Cuban Dirección General de Inteligencia, where he rose to the rank of first lieutenant. There are conflicting reports about the nature of Sarraff's intelligence activities. According to a biography published by his relatives during his time in prison, his work at the secret service was merely that of a journalist. According to sources quoted by the McClatchy's Washington correspondent, he was part of the Department M-XV, which was in charge of encrypted communications with the Cuban agents. The same sources claim he provided information about secret operations to another Cuban who was spying for the United States, Jose Cohen, who passed it on to the CIA. Media reports quoting U.S. government sources that portrayed Sarraff as an expert in cryptography were disputed by Cohen.

According to unspecific statements from White House officials, the information provided by Sarraff helped the exposé of Cuban agents who infiltrated a variety of US-based organizations, including Military intelligence, the State Department and anti-Castro groups in exile.

Newsweek reported this led to the conviction of Ana Montes (Defence Intelligence Agency analyst), Kendall Myers (US Department of State official) and his wife, Gwendolyn Myers, as well as the Wasp Network of 40 Cuban spies in anti-Castro groups in Florida.

== Arrest and conviction ==
Former US Army counterintelligence officer Chris Simmons said that Sarraff was caught after his associate, Cohen, indiscreetly spent the large amount of money he received from the CIA. After noting he was under surveillance, Cohen signaled the CIA station in Havana for an "emergency extraction". Sarraff was supposed to be taken out of Cuba as well, but it was too late for him: he was arrested on 2 November 1995 and in September 1996, he was sentenced to 25 years in prison for passing state secrets to the US government. However, Cohen provided a different account to The Miami Herald, saying that he had fled Cuba on a raft, without CIA assistance.

According to Sarraff's sister Vilma, an active campaigner for his release, the prosecution did not present "a single piece of evidence" against him during the trial, and the judge did not accept any evidence or witnesses in his favor, resulting in an "arbitrary" criminal case.

Newsweek reported that Sarraff's betrayal was considered so damaging he would have faced execution had it not been for his parents being loyal senior Cuban intelligence officials. According to his family, Sarraff had consistently denied all charges during his time in prison. After learning about media reports naming his son as the United States' "most important intelligence asset" referred to by President Obama, Sarraff's father said he had always believed in his son's innocence.

In April 2014, Sarraff wrote an open letter from his Havana jail, which was published by the Cuban Human Rights Observatory. He referred to international media speculation about a possible exchange of U.S. citizen Philip Gross in Cuba for the remaining three members of the Cuban Five in the United States and urged a comprehensive exchange including all prisoners convicted for espionage in Cuba. He called for general support in preparing public opinion for such an exchange and suggested a focus on humanitarian considerations, especially with respect to those convicted spies—like himself and the three Cubans arrested in Miami in 1998—who had already spent more than 15 years in prison.

== Release ==
In 2014, a thaw in the relations between the United States and Cuba led to a swap of three Cuban spies (of the Cuban Five) in exchange for Alan Gross and an unnamed spy. Without identifying Sarraff, Obama said that the freed spy is "one of the most important intelligence agents that the United States has ever had in Cuba, and who has been imprisoned for nearly two decades".

Various commentators immediately noted that, as a DGI agent convicted for espionage in 1995, Sarraff was the only known prisoner matching the description. Following news reports about Sarraff's likely release, his family complained they had not heard from him and were left without any official information on his whereabouts. Almost four weeks after he had been moved from his last prison cell in Havana, Sarraff's sister Vilma informed media he had called her and let her know he was now in the United States, "free and doing fine".

== Media reports ==
Although DIA officials wouldn't describe his role in detail, Brian P. Hale said that the information provided by him were "instrumental in the identification and disruption of several Cuban intelligence operatives in the United States and ultimately led to a series of successful federal espionage prosecutions".

On December 18, 2014, two of the New York Times Pulitzer Award-winning journalists, Mark Mazzetti and Michael S. Schmidt, collaborated on a front-page profile of Sarraff.

José Cohen, who the New York Times described as Sarraff's co-accused, and had successfully defected to the US, said he would not discuss the allegations against Sarraff, until he knew he had left Cuba, as Cuban authority had never had any proof of their guilt. He said he was concerned that if he divulged details before he knew Sarraff really had left Cuba, he could be re-arrested.

== See also ==
- Bill Gaede
