= DAI Global =

Development company in the US

DAI Global, LLC
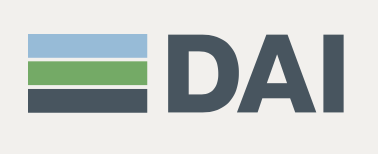
- Type: Private
- Industry: Economic and social development
- Founded: 1970; 56 years ago
- Headquarters: Bethesda, Maryland, US
- Key people: Tine Knott (CEO); Zan Northrip (EVP, Development Partners Group)
- Revenue: $5.1 billion (May 2024)
- Owner: Employee Owned
- Website: www.dai.com

DAI Global, LLC is a privately held development company with corporate offices in more than a dozen countries, including in Bethesda, Maryland, in the United States; London and Apsley, Hertfordshire, in the United Kingdom; Abuja and Lagos, in Nigeria; Ramallah, Palestine; Brussels, Vienna, and other European capitals.

In 2015, it received US$272,429,308 of contract funding by USAID to deliver development services; in 2014, it received £58.3 million from the U.K. Department for International Development for such services.

DAI operates worldwide, with a particularly strong presence in Central America, South America, Africa, the Middle East, Central Asia, South Asia, and the Asia-Pacific region. It has worked in 160 developing and transition countries in the areas of water and natural resources management, energy and climate change, governance and public sector management, private sector development and development finances, economics and trade, agriculture and agribusiness, crisis mitigation and stability operations, digital acceleration, and global health.

== History ==
DAI was founded in 1970 as Development Alternatives, Inc., it is now legally renamed and formally registered as DAI Global, LLC, by Charles Franklin Sweet, Donald R. Mickelwait, and John M. Buck, who met at the John F. Kennedy School of Government at Harvard University. Prior to enrolling in the M.P.A program at Harvard in 1969, Sweet had spent five years working in Vietnam for both International Voluntary Services and the United States Department of State.

DAI's early work mostly consisted of analytical studies for government clients. In 1973, DAI won a contract to conduct a comparative study of 36 USAID projects in Latin America and Africa. Two years later, the company's study, Strategies for Small Farmer Development, established the concept of a "process approach" that enabled the pursuit of development objectives while allowing enough leeway to adapt to evolving conditions on the ground. The study consolidated DAI's reputation in the development community and led to further business.

In 1980, DAI opened its first regional office in Jakarta, Indonesia. In 1985, Jim Boomgard, later CEO, then a Ph.D. agricultural economist, played a key role in developing an approach to small business promotion in developing countries. He managed a multicountry study on the emerging field of microenterprise development, which led to DAI winning a major new worldwide contract: Growth and Equity through Micro-enterprise Investments and Institutions (GEMINI).

At the start of the 1990s, DAI moved its headquarters from Washington, D.C., to Bethesda, Maryland. In 1995, DAI invested in London, UK-based Graham Bannock & Partners Ltd., which as the now wholly owned DAI Europe would go on to give DAI a presence as an implementing partner for the U.K. Department for International Development, the European Bank for Reconstruction and Development, and other European clients. In South Africa, DAI established Ebony Development Alternatives in 1994 as a joint venture with Ebony Financial Services, the first black accounting firm in South Africa. This company was renamed Ebony Consulting International and subsequently ECIAfrica.

Following the terrorist attacks on New York City and Washington, D.C., on September 11, 2001, the United States invaded Afghanistan and DAI was chosen to lead a variety of development projects in the midst of the counterinsurgency. A Philadelphia Inquirer journalist who visited one of DAI's projects in 2010 described it as a "model of success". After the United States invaded Iraq in 2003, DAI won a project to help provide effective governance in the country. Other projects in Iraq covering agriculture and the restoration of the Iraqi Marshlands were to follow. For his work on the later project, DAI's Peter Reiss was awarded the Lourdes Arizpe award by the American Anthropological Association. The company established DAI Palestine in 2004.

Following the Asian tsunami in December of that year DAI was recognized for its efforts in both Indonesia and Sri Lanka by then USAID Administrator Andrew Natsios in testimony before Congress: "In this environment, the international relief community, including USAID, the U.S. military, and other U.S. Government agencies, displayed remarkable ingenuity. Despite the great size and complexity of the response, flexibility became the rule of the day. A good example of this is the partnership between USAID and two of its partners, the International Organization for Migration (IOM) and Development Alternatives (DAI). Prior to the earthquake, humanitarian organizations were not permitted into Aceh province without express permission by the Government of Indonesia. Despite this restriction, IOM and DAI had managed to retain a strong relationship with provincial officials through a network of local staff in every district. In the immediate aftermath of the disaster, USAID and other donors capitalized on these relationships by providing relief funding to IOM and DAI to immediately move relief commodities into Aceh from Medan on 80 trucks contracted by USAID/Indonesia."

In 2005 the employee stock ownership plan (ESOP) became the sole owner of the company. The ESOP, a retirement plan in which all corporate employees are automatically enrolled, now represents hundreds of employees, none of whom owns more than 3 percent of the company. In 2006, DAI was named Government Contractor of the year in an annual award sponsored by Washington Technology magazine, the Professional Service Council, and GovCon.

At the start of 2009, Boomgard succeeded Tony Barclay as DAI's new CEO and the company, launched new offices in Amman, Mexico City and Islamabad. The next year, Julian Lob-Levyt—formerly CEO of the GAVI Alliance—joined the firm to lead its international operations from the London office, DAI was named the #1 company in the state of Maryland, and the company celebrated its 40th birthday with a series of community events at its locations around the world, publishing a history of the company to mark the occasion. In his foreword to the book, Jim Boomgard looked ahead to the next chapter in DAI's history: "The next 10 years will determine whether we can make an American success story into a global success story. Over the next 10 years, we'll execute a new strategy designed to bring our strengths, our experience, and our commitment to a changing and in many ways expanding landscape of international development—a landscape that will see more development driven from the ground up, more decision making in countries that have traditionally been the recipients of donor assistance, and a more diverse and influential array of local actors in the development arena."

In 2011, DAI was named a Devex Top 40 Development Innovator, one of only 10 consulting firms so honored globally. The award was based on a poll of 100,000 Devex members, who comprise the world's largest network of international development professionals.

Tine Knott was appointed President of DAI in June, 2024 and succeeded Jim Boomgard as CEO in 2025.

In early 2025, DAI's business was hit by the closure of the United States Agency for International Development (USAID) which was one of its principal clients. The company filed suit against USAID and other government entities including the Department of State and the Office of Management and Budget over what it claimed was the non-payment of $115 million owed to it by USAID. The company laid off over 500 workers in the US and sold some non-core units including MicroVest Capital Management.

== Clients ==
Clients of DAI include development agencies, international lending institutions, private corporations and philanthropies, and governments. Among them: United States Agency for International Development, European Commission, U.K. Department for International Development, European Bank for Reconstruction and Development, United States Department of Defense, United States Department of State, Millennium Challenge Corporation, Australian Agency for International Development (AusAid), World Bank, International Finance Corporation, Bill & Melinda Gates Foundation, World Food Programme, Asian Development Bank, and various private companies and national governments.

== Incidents ==
On September 26, 2010, Linda Norgrove and three Afghan colleagues were kidnapped in the Chawkay (aka Tsawkay, Sawkay) district of eastern Kunar Province. Ambushed by members of the Taliban on the main highway from Jalalabad to Asadabad, Norgrove and others were eventually taken into the Dewegal Valley within the Chowkai District by their captors. Eventually, a rescue attempt was carried out by Navy SEALs, from the Naval Special Warfare Development Group (also known as Navy SEAL Team 6), a unit used for high-risk counter-terrorist operations. Norgrove was wounded in the action, received emergency medical treatment and was evacuated by helicopter, but died from her injuries.

In December 2009, Alan Phillip Gross was detained by Cuban authorities after attempting to distribute satellite communications equipment. He was principal of a small business called JBDC, working as a subcontractor on a USAID project. The Supreme Court of Cuba sentenced Gross to 15 years of imprisonment despite diplomatic pressure from high level American officials. Gross was released in December 2014 at the same time as other prisoners were released on both sides (US and Cuba) and announcement of planned resumption of diplomatic relations.

== See also ==
- Death of Linda Norgrove
