= Death of Linda Norgrove =

2010 aid worker kidnapping in Afghanistan

Linda Norgrove
- Norgrove in Afghanistan, 2010
- Born: 4 September 1974; Altnaharra, Scotland, UK
- Died: 8 October 2010 (aged 36); Korangal Valley, Afghanistan
- Education: University of Aberdeen (BA); University of London (MA); University of Manchester (PhD)
- Occupation: Humanitarian aid worker

On 26 September 2010, British aid worker Linda Norgrove and three Afghan colleagues were kidnapped by members of the Taliban in the Kunar Province of eastern Afghanistan. She was working in the country as regional director for Development Alternatives Incorporated, a contractor for US and other government agencies. The group were taken to the nearby Dewegal Valley area. United States and Afghan forces began a search of the area, placing roadblocks to prevent the group from being moved east into Pakistan.

Norgrove's captors demanded the release of Aafia Siddiqui in exchange for her return. The Taliban released the three Afghans on 3 October 2010 during negotiations. The United States Naval Special Warfare Development Group conducted a predawn rescue attempt five days later on the Taliban mountain hideout where Norgrove was held captive, amid concerns that she would be killed or moved by her kidnappers. US forces killed several kidnappers and three local farmers during the assault. They subsequently located Norgrove, badly wounded in a nearby gully, and she died later from her injuries, which were inflicted by a fragmentation grenade used by US Special Operation Forces.

Initial reports said that she had been killed by an explosion set off by one of her captors. A joint official investigation by the United Kingdom and the United States later concluded that her fatal injuries were inflicted by a grenade thrown by a member of the special operations team that was trying to rescue her. A February 2011 coroner's narrative verdict reported that Norgrove died during the failed rescue attempt. In October 2012, one of her colleagues said in an interview that the captors had told Norgrove that they had no intention of killing her.

== Early life, education and work ==
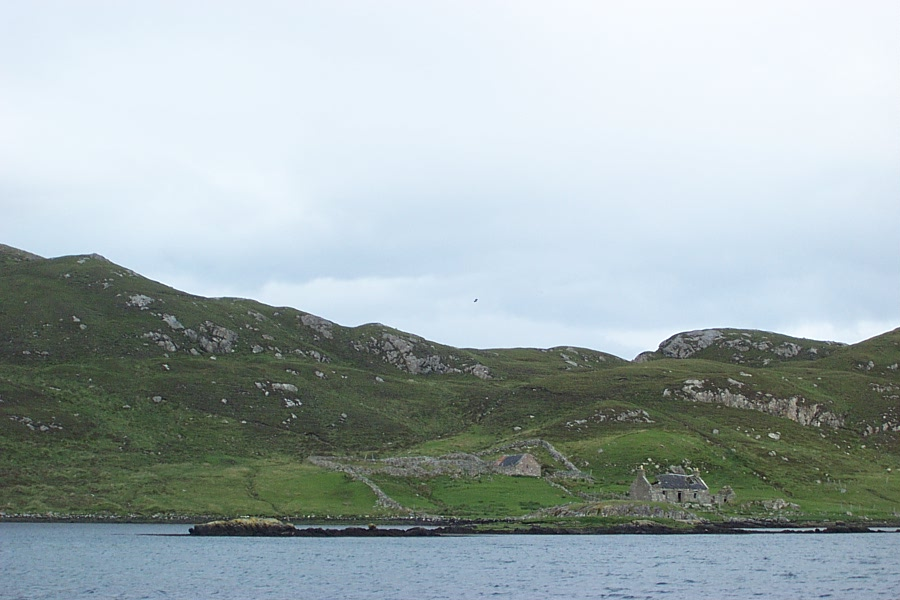
The Isle of Lewis, Scotland, where Norgrove grew up

Norgrove was born in Altnaharra, Scotland, in 1974 to John and Lorna Norgrove. She grew up on a croft on the Isle of Lewis in the Western Isles, attending a primary school in Uig. She later attended the Nicolson Institute in Stornoway. Norgrove went to the University of Aberdeen, taking a first in tropical environmental science; her coursework included postgraduate research at the university of Chiapas in Mexico and a year of study at the University of Oregon (1993–94). She attended the University of London, receiving a MA with distinction in rural resources and environmental policy in 1997.

In 2002, Norgrove received a PhD from the University of Manchester in development policy and management. From 2002 to 2005, she worked for the World Wide Fund in Peru, supporting (and later supervising) the WWF's Forest Programme in the Peruvian Andes. At the time of her death, in addition to her aid work, Norgrove was working towards an MBA from the University of Warwick through distance learning. She worked in Afghanistan for the United Nations from 2005 to 2008, and as regional director of an international development company based in Jalalabad beginning in February 2010. She also worked in Laos as an environmental specialist for the UN in 2008–09, Mexico and Uganda where Norgrove researched the effects of national park management on the indigenous population near Mount Elgon National Park.

== Kidnapping ==
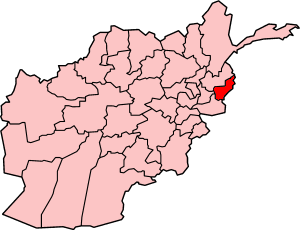
Map of Afghanistan, with Kunar Province in red

On 26 September 2010, Norgrove and three Afghan colleagues were travelling in the Chawkay District (also known as Tsawkay and Sawkay) of eastern Kunar Province when they were kidnapped by local insurgents. They were ambushed while driving on the main highway from Jalalabad to Asadabad, in the Dewagal valley, in two unarmoured, unmarked Toyota Corollas. A US military convoy was ambushed two months earlier on the same stretch of road. Norgrove wore a burqa to disguise her foreign appearance. According to four sources within the United States military and intelligence services, at the time Norgrove was working for Development Alternatives Incorporated and was secretly employed by MI6. However, this claim cannot be fully substantiated due to the confidential nature of its sources. Her family has regarded the claims as "ridiculous." They have also claimed, "Linda was passionately against war, disliked the military with a vengeance and mostly sided with Afghans rather than western governments."

Dressed in men's clothing by her captors, she was taken first into the mountains and then brought to the Dewegal Valley in Chowkai District (which crosses the Korengal Valley). US Army troops from Bravo Company, 2/327 Infantry, 1st Brigade Combat Team, 101st Airborne Division began a 12-day search supported by Afghan army, police and commando units under the codename "Enterprise". A house-to-house search was conducted and roadblocks posted at the valley entrance to prevent Norgrove's captors from transferring her eastward into Pakistan. The difficult terrain (with few roads) complicated and slowed the process; the search efforts succeeded in containing the kidnappers in the vicinity and several local Taliban members were killed.

=== Negotiations ===
It was unclear at first who had kidnapped Norgrove and her colleagues. A Taliban commander, the Pakistan-based Mohammed Osman, was reported to demand the release of Aafia Siddiqui in return for Norgrove's freedom. Siddiqui, known as "Lady al-Qaeda", had received an 86-year prison sentence in the US on 26 September. "We are lucky that we abducted this British woman soon after the ruthless ruling by an American court on Aafia Siddiqui. We will demand the release of Aafia Siddiqui in exchange for her", said Osman.

Other Afghan sources denied any link to Osman. US military sources identified Norgrove's captors as Kunar Taliban, and British Foreign Secretary William Hague said they were from a Salafist group affiliated with the local Taliban, known as Jamaat al Dawa al Quran. An Afghan intelligence official later identified her captors as local commanders Mullah Basir and Mullah Keftan. Negotiations for Norgrove's release were conducted through local tribal elders.

The three Afghans captured with Norgrove were released on 3 October. British Prime Minister David Cameron said that the primary fear was that she "was going to be passed up the terrorist chain, which would increase further the already high risk that she would be killed." The British foreign office asked the media not to release details about Norgrove's personal life while she was in captivity to avoid attaching "trophy value" to her kidnapping.

=== Rescue attempt and death ===
Intelligence reports indicated that a group of local elders were calling for Norgrove to be executed "like the Russian" (a possible reference to the Russian war in Afghanistan). The intelligence prompted Cameron and Hague to approve a United States special operations effort to rescue Norgrove during her 13th night of captivity. The operation was spearheaded by "SEAL Team Six", Navy SEALs from the Naval Special Warfare Development Group.

The SEALs staged a predawn raid on the Taliban hillside compound hideout, where Norgrove was held in a shack, on 8 October 2010. The stronghold was surrounded by 5-metre (16 ft) high, 1-metre (3 ft) thick perimeter walls in a densely wooded area in the village of Dineshgal, 2,400 metres (8,000 ft) up a steep mountain in the Korengal Valley.

At approximately 3:30 am, 20 SEALs and about 24 US Army Rangers from the 75th Ranger Regiment (wearing night-vision goggles) approached the compound, fast roping from two CH-47 Chinook helicopters. They were fired on from the compound and from a nearby position by Taliban armed with AK-47s, rocket-propelled grenades, and suicide vests. Two American snipers aboard a helicopter killed two guards using sound-suppressed rifles. An AC-130 Spectre gunship provided the US troops on the ground with close air support, killing two fleeing Taliban. The Rangers secured enemy positions on the nearby hills, and all six Taliban gunmen who fought the US forces were killed.

During the gunfight, Norgrove's captors dragged her outside the building where she was being held, but she apparently broke away from them. Video footage of the raid showed an explosion in her vicinity; Norgrove was then found, injured, in a fetal position in a gully.

Norgrove was removed from the scene via helicopter and received medical care, but she died. It was reported initially that she had been killed by one of her captors setting off a suicide vest. According to The Guardian, insurgents often put on suicide vests if they think they are in danger of being attacked. Taliban commanders Mullah Basir and Mullah Keftan (who were holding Norgrove) were among those killed in the raid, according to an Afghan intelligence official. Other women and children in the compound were uninjured, and no members of the rescue team were wounded.

== Joint investigation ==
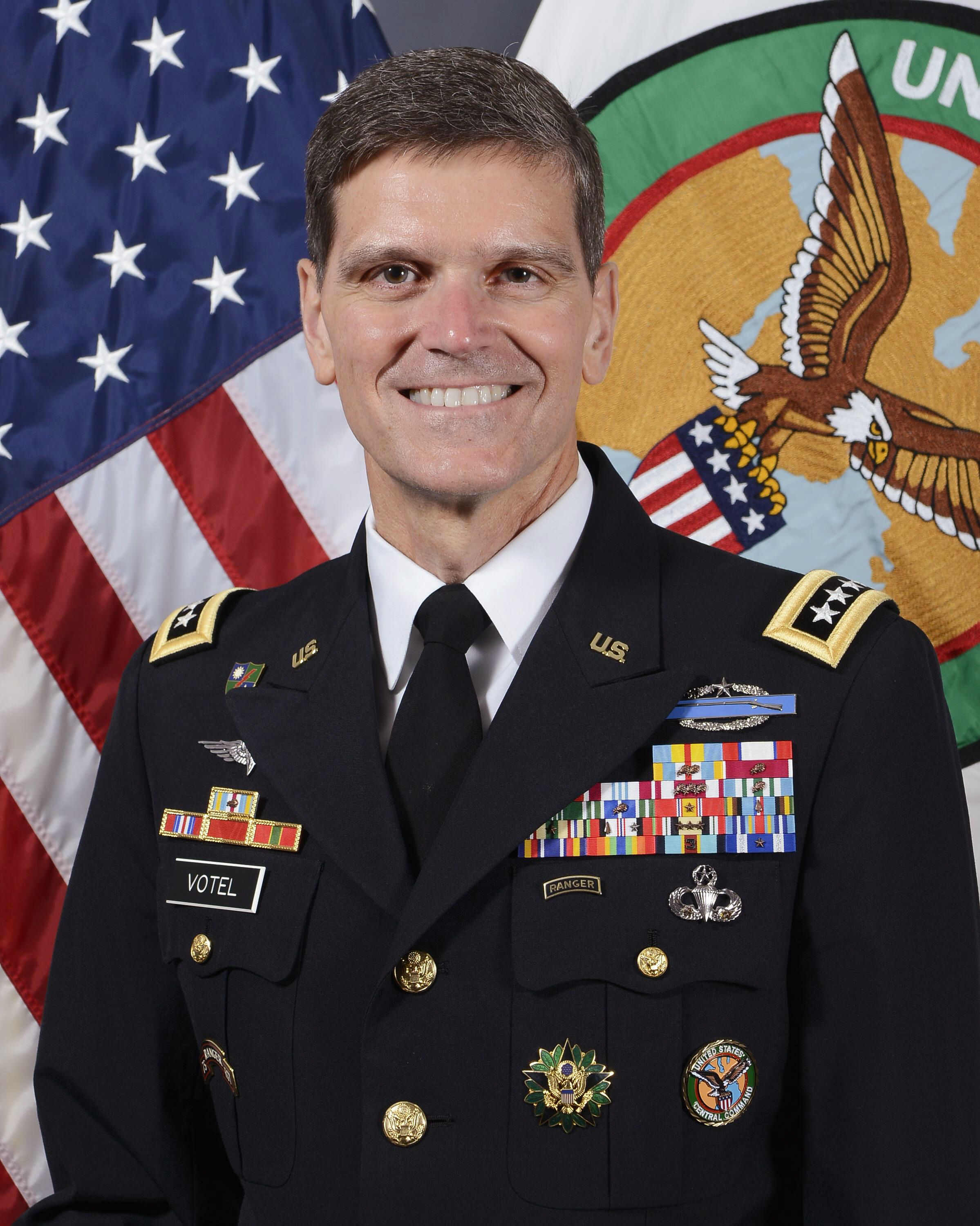
Major General, later General, Joseph Votel, led the investigation.

The British Foreign Secretary, William Hague, announced Norgrove's death. In a written statement, he said that after receiving information on her location it was "decided that, given the danger she was facing, her best chance of safe release was to act on that information." David Cameron, the UK Prime Minister, defended the rescue attempt: "Decisions on operations to free hostages are always difficult. But where a British life is in such danger, and where we and our allies can act, I believe it is right to try".

On 10 October, an unnamed Afghan intelligence officer said that Norgrove was killed by a grenade thrown by one of her captors. The following day, Cameron said that new information indicated Norgrove may have accidentally been killed by a US grenade. A US military statement read: "Subsequent review of surveillance footage and discussions with members of the rescue team do not conclusively determine the cause of her death".

US President Barack Obama promised "to get to the bottom" of the failed rescue attempt. General David Petraeus, commander of the NATO security force in Afghanistan, ordered an investigation into the incident. US Major General Joseph Votel (then Chief of Staff of the US Special Operations Command) and British Brigadier Robert Nitsch (Head of Joint Force Support, UK Forces Afghanistan) were appointed to lead a joint UK and US investigation. It was reported on 12 October that the results were expected within days, and Norgrove's family was kept informed of the investigation's progress.

While the military investigation was conducted, Norgrove's body was returned to the United Kingdom on 14 October on a Royal Air Force flight to RAF Lyneham. A humanist funeral ceremony, attended by hundreds of people, was held on 26 October at the Uig Community Centre in the Western Isles. Norgrove was buried at Ardroil cemetery.

On 2 December, Hague announced the results of the joint investigation, which concluded that Norgrove was accidentally killed by a grenade thrown by a US sailor. Navy SEALs did not immediately notify senior officers about throwing the grenade; this breached military law, and a number of sailors were disciplined.

A post-mortem examination of Norgrove's body was conducted by British coroner Russell Delaney on 19 October 2010. Detective Chief Inspector Colin Smith of the Metropolitan Police told an inquest, opened 22 October in the Salisbury coroner's court, that the examination identified the cause of death as "penetrating fragment injuries to the head and chest." In February 2011, the coroner recorded a narrative verdict confirming the earlier military investigations' findings that Norgrove was killed by a member of the US rescue team, noting that a gunshot wound to the leg Norgrove received during the rescue did not contribute to her death. In October 2012, Abdul Wadood, Norgrove's colleague and fellow captive, told the BBC that she asked the kidnappers if they were going to kill her and that they assured her they would not.

== Tributes ==
James Boomgard, regional director for Development Alternatives Inc., the company employing Norgrove when she was kidnapped, released a statement: "We are saddened beyond words by the death of a wonderful woman whose sole purpose in Afghanistan was to do good – to help the Afghan people achieve a measure of prosperity and stability in their everyday lives as they set about rebuilding their country". United Nations Humanitarian Coordinator Robert Watkins praised Norgrove: "She was a true advocate for the people of Afghanistan and was dedicated to bringing improvements to their lives", and "her spirit and compassion will be greatly missed". First Minister of Scotland Alex Salmond said: "Ms Norgrove was a dedicated aid worker who was doing everything she could to help people in Afghanistan—hopefully that legacy of service in a humanitarian cause can be of some comfort to her loved ones in their time of grief".

Norgrove received the 2011 Robert Burns Humanitarian Award posthumously for her work in Afghanistan. Her family has established the Linda Norgrove Foundation to continue her relief work. In 2024, the Norgrove Foundation sponsored 19 female Afghan medical students to complete their education in Scotland after their studies were halted by the Taliban in 2021.

== See also ==
- 2010 Badakhshan massacre
- List of solved missing person cases (2010s)
- Attacks on humanitarian workers
