= Cuban thaw =

2015–2017 normalization of Cuba–U.S. relations

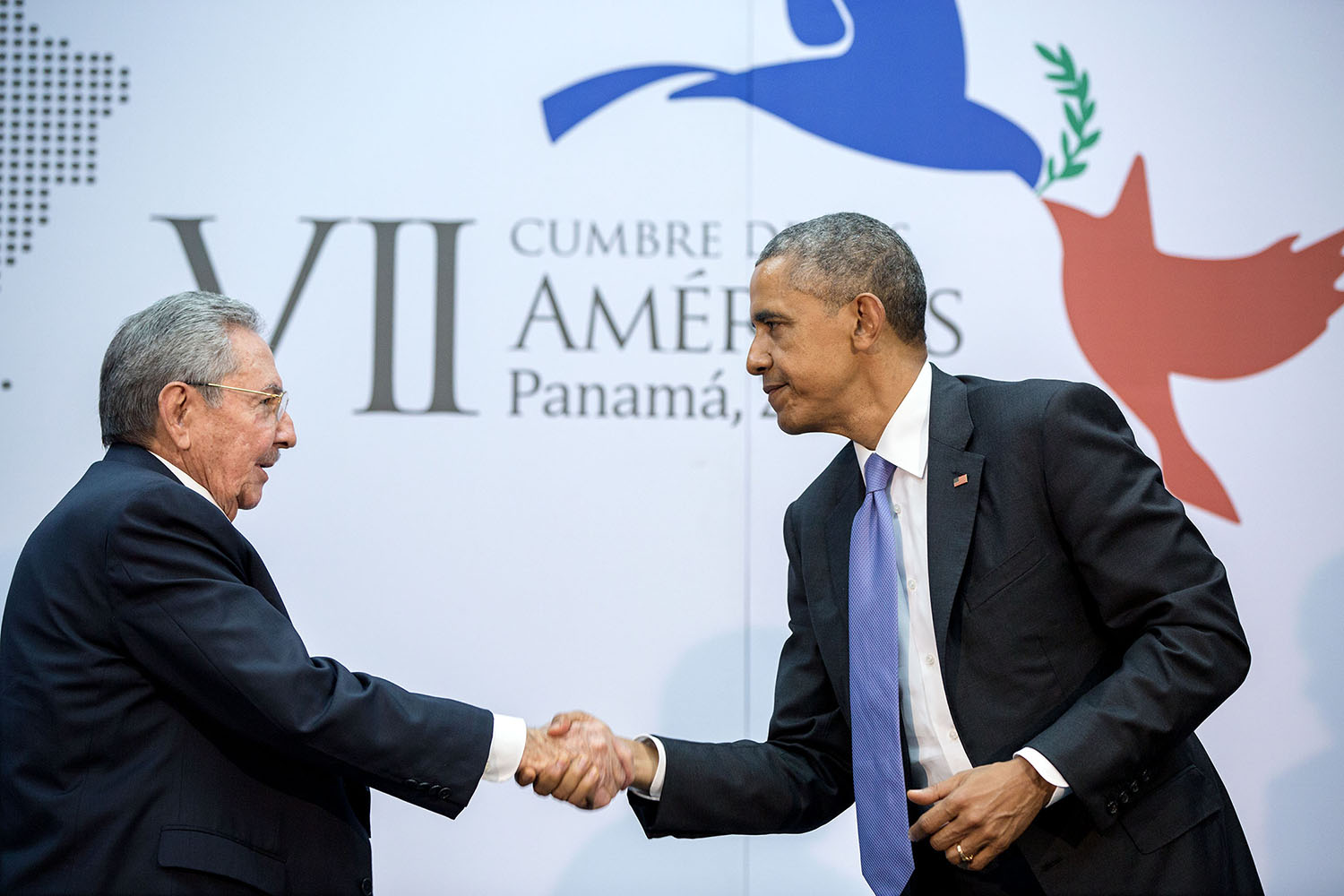
- U.S. president Obama meets with Cuban leader Raúl Castro in Panama, 2015
- Date: July 20, 2015 – June 16, 2017
- Patron: Pope Francis
- Organized by: Barack Obama (United States); Raúl Castro (Cuba); Stephen Harper (Canada); Pope Francis (Holy See)
- Participants: Canada; Cuba; Holy See; United States

The Cuban thaw (Spanish: deshielo cubano, pronounced [desˈʝelo kuˈβano]) was a normalization of Cuba–United States relations from July 2015 to June 2017, ending a 54-year stretch of hostility between the nations. In March 2016, Barack Obama became the first U.S. president to visit Cuba since Calvin Coolidge in 1928. The diplomatic détente was reversed by the U.S. government under President Donald Trump due to a variety of subsequent geopolitical issues. Modern diplomatic relations are cold, stemming from historic conflict and divergent political ideologies.

The initial easing of relations was mediated by Pope Francis and hosted by Canada after multilateral dialogue with First Secretary of the Communist Party of Cuba Raúl Castro in 2014. A normalization agreement was put in place that year, easing the U.S. embargo against Cuba. The agreement would lift restrictions on the Cuban travel ban, remittances to Cuba, and access to the Cuban financial system. The U.S. embassy in Havana and Cuban embassy in Washington both re-opened, previously designated as latent "interests sections". In 2015, the U.S. waived Cuba's designation as a State Sponsor of Terrorism in a major U.S. foreign policy divergence.

Relations deteriorated sharply over the status of human rights in Cuba. The inauguration of President Trump in 2017 led to a reversal of accommodative U.S. foreign policy toward Cuba. The U.S. embargo was significantly tightened with a travel ban preceding heightened restrictions on financial transactions benefiting the Cuban armed forces. The U.S. government further retaliated for protest crackdowns and human rights abuse in 2021 and again in 2024. Since the Cuban thaw, both nations have contested issues on counterterrorism, immigration, electoral interference, financial claims, fugitive extradition and Cuban foreign policy.

== Prisoner exchange ==
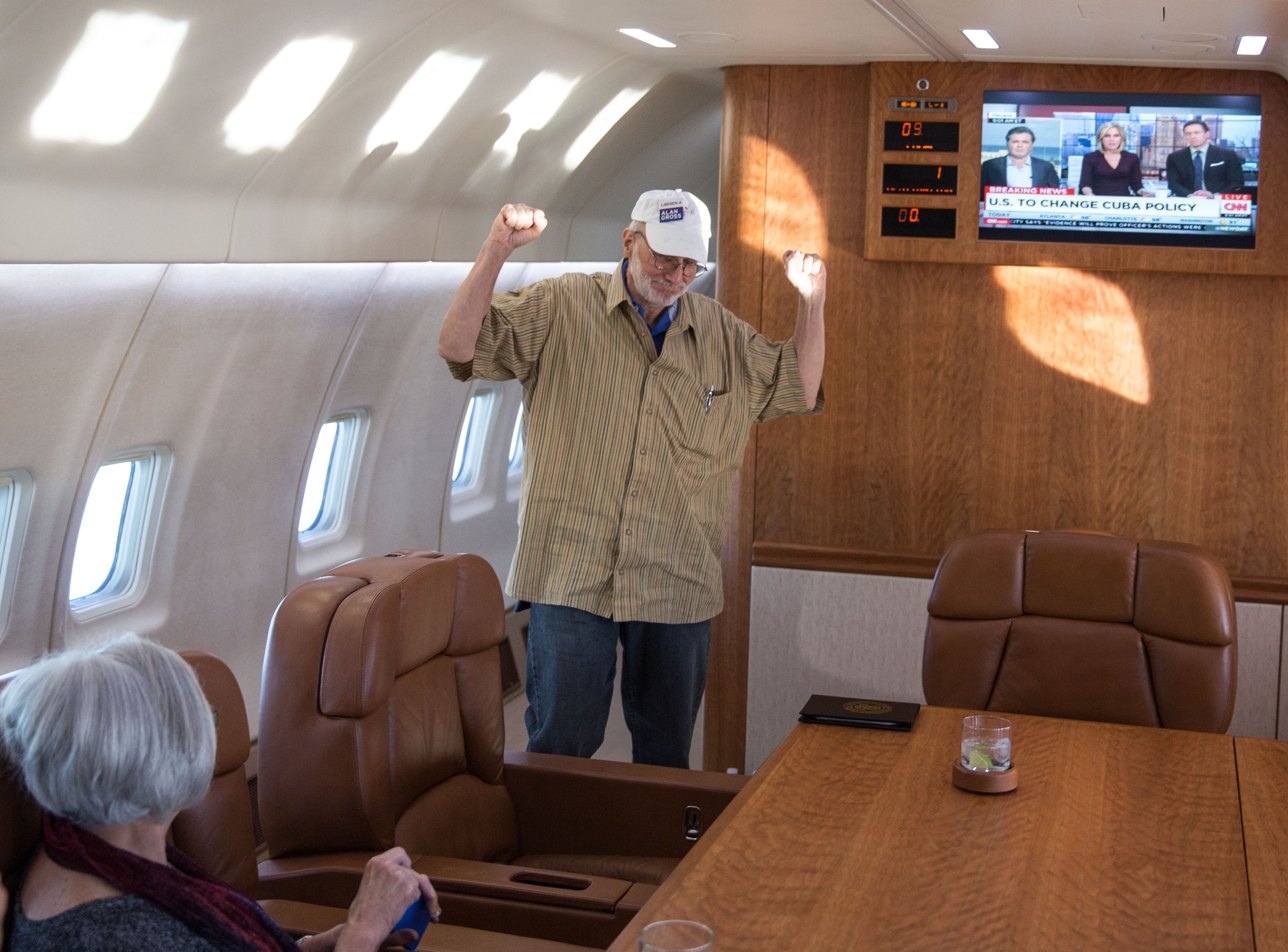
Alan Gross en route to Andrews Air Force Base in the United States on December 17, 2014, aboard a U.S. government plane; Gross was released by the Cuban government in a prisoner swap.

In May 2012, it was reported that the U.S. had declined a "spy swap" proposed by the Cuban government, wherein the remaining three of an original group of Cuban prisoners the U.S. had convicted of espionage known as the Cuban Five, in prison in the U.S. since the 1990s, would be returned to Cuba in exchange for USAID contractor Alan Gross. Gross had been imprisoned in Cuba for providing illegal cellphone chips of a type used by CIA agents, which are designed to evade detection, in addition to computer equipment, satellite phones, and internet access to Cuba's Jewish community.

Despite initial U.S. refusals, the prisoner swap took place in December 2014 following Obama's announcement of intent to move towards normalized relations. In addition to Gross, the swap included Rolando Sarraff Trujillo, a Cuban who had worked as an agent for American intelligence and had been imprisoned for nearly 20 years. Additionally, the Cuban government releasing 53 imprisoned dissidents, as requested by the United States.

The prisoner swap marked the biggest shift in White House policy towards Cuba since the imposition of the United States embargo against Cuba in 1962, and removed a key obstacle to bilateral relations. Gross became a vocal advocate of the normalization of relations, even offering to visit Cuba again in support of such a result.

== Easing of travel and trade restrictions ==
Although the embargo can only be ended by the U.S. Congress, the Obama administration took executive action to ease some restrictions on travel to Cuba by U.S. citizens, as well as restrictions on the import and export of goods between each country. In his 2015 State of the Union Address to Congress, Obama called on lawmakers to lift the embargo, a message he reiterated in his 2016 address.

In February 2015, Conan O'Brien became the first American television personality to film in Cuba after the thaw, and only the third in more than half a century, culminating in the first Conan Without Borders special. In May 2015, the Minnesota Orchestra performed several concerts in Havana, the first professional U.S. orchestra to play in Cuba since 1999.

Major League Baseball (MLB) held talks about playing spring training games in Cuba in 2015 but lacked time to arrange them. On March 22, 2016, the Tampa Bay Rays played an exhibition game against the Cuba national team at Estadio Latinoamericano in Havana with Obama and Castro in attendance.

Sun Country Airlines began operating charter flights between New York's John F. Kennedy International Airport and Havana's José Martí International Airport. The United States granted approval to four companies to offer chartered ferry service between Miami and Cuba. Carnival Cruise Line received permission from Cuba to resume cruises from Miami to Havana for the first time in 50 years. Cuba, however, still prohibited the Cuban-born from returning by sea, and Carnival therefore refused to accept reservations from the Cuban-born. Following public protests against such an exclusionary policy, Carnival told the Cuban authorities it would not sail unless the policy was changed; the Cuban government relented, and the first Carnival cruise sailed from Miami on May 1, 2016.

Between January and May 2015, the number of Americans visiting Cuba who had no family ties there was 36% higher than during the same months in 2014. A report by the Pew Research Center found that the number of Cubans entering the U.S. in 2015 was 78% higher than in 2014.

== Normalization of relations ==
The letter U.S. president Barack Obama sent to Cuban leader Raúl Castro of Cuba about re-establishing diplomatic relations and permanent diplomatic missions in the United States and Cuba, June 30, 2015

President Barack Obama delivers remarks on the re-establishment of the American embassy in Cuba. July 1, 2015

It has been said that the United States–Cuban thaw was spurred by Cuba's main international partner, Venezuela, which was experiencing sharp economic decline. Venezuela subsidized the government of Cuba, but following the oil price drop resulting from the 2010s oil glut, it could no longer afford to do so.

=== Bilateral talks ===
On January 21, 2015, the United States and Cuba began bilateral talks in Havana to discuss further normalization issues. The U.S. delegation was led by U.S. assistant secretary of state Roberta S. Jacobson, and Josefina Vidal Ferreiro, Cuba's head of North American affairs. The talks reportedly centered around migration policy. In particular, Cuban representatives urged the U.S. to end its immigration privileges to Cuban refugees, also known as the wet feet, dry feet policy, which allows any fleeing Cuban citizens to apply for U.S. residency and citizenship, as long as they are found on U.S. soil and not at sea. Reuters reported that civilian uncertainty about the status of U.S. immigration policy following the thaw was promoting a surge of emigrants fleeing Cuba for the U.S.

The U.S. delegation made it clear that "improved human rights conditions, including freedom of expression and assembly", remain a central element in normalizing U.S.–Cuban relations. Furthermore, despite Cuban objections, the U.S. stated that it will stand by its Cuban migration policy under the Cuban Adjustment Act.

A second round of talks took place in Washington, D.C., in February 2015. Negotiators described the talks as productive and said several issues were close to resolution. However, the issue of Cuba's listing among State Sponsors of Terrorism by the U.S. government remained a significant sticking point, although Cuban diplomat Josefina Vidal said its removal was not strictly a precondition to reopening embassies.

A third round of talks were held in Havana from March 16–17, 2015. However, the talks ended abruptly after just a day, without any public comment. Obama and Castro met at the Summit of the Americas in Panama on April 10–11, where Castro delivered an address praising Obama and apologizing for blaming his government for the ongoing U.S. embargo. After meeting with Obama, Castro called for the reopening of the embassies, while both leaders said they were looking forward to more direct engagement between Cuba and the United States despite their differences.

The Vatican and Pope Francis played a symbolic but substantial role in helping facilitate the normalization of diplomatic relations between the U.S. and Cuba. The Catholic Church has remained in close cooperation with Havana even after the 1959 revolution.

=== "State sponsor of terrorism" designation ===
In addition to Cuba's concern over U.S. migration policy, the Cuban delegation assured the U.S. that normalization talks would not yield significant changes unless Cuba is removed from the list of State Sponsors of Terrorism. Cuba was one of four countries on the list, the other three being Iran, Sudan, and Syria. The U.S. government said that it had begun an intelligence review in order to evaluate whether Cuba can be removed from the list.

On April 14, 2015, Obama informed the U.S. Congress that he had decided to lift the designation because "the government of Cuba has not provided any support for international terrorism during the preceding six-month period", and it "has provided assurances that it will not support acts of international terrorism in the future". The U.S. Congress could have blocked this by passing legislation within 45 days, but no member of Congress introduced such legislation, and Cuba was officially removed from the list on May 29, 2015. On May 20, 2015, the Cuban government opened a bank account in the United States, enabling it to do non-cash business in the United States for the first time since the embargo began.

=== Embassies ===
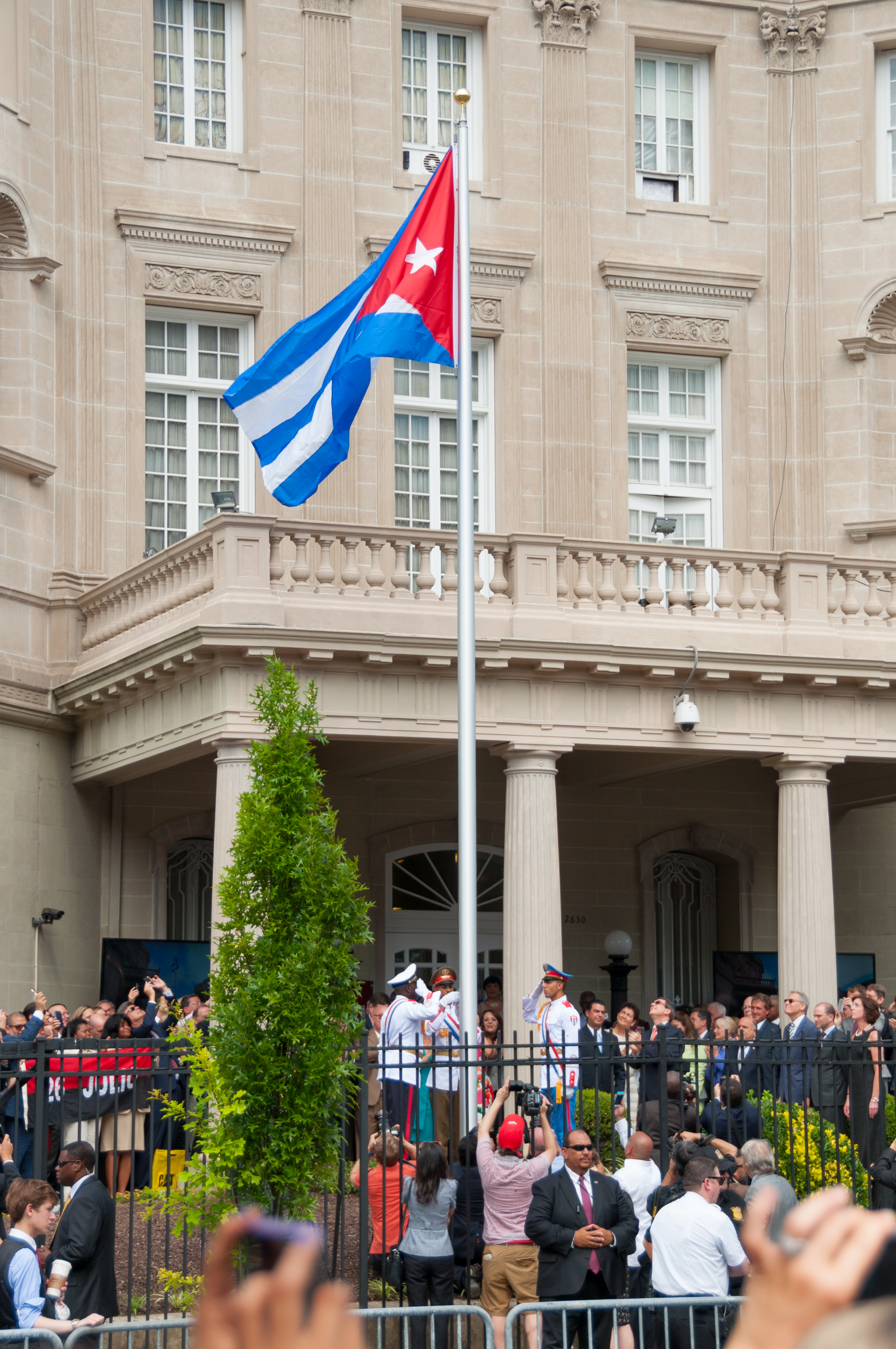
The Flag of Cuba is raised during the official reopening of the Embassy of Cuba in Washington, D.C., on 20 July 2015.

Cuba and the United States officially resumed full diplomatic relations in July 2015, with the "Cuban interests section" in Washington, D.C., and the "U.S. interests section" in Havana being upgraded to embassies. A ceremony was held at the Cuban Embassy to raise the flag of Cuba, with U.S. Secretary of State John Kerry and Cuban Foreign Minister Bruno Rodríguez Parrilla holding a joint news conference afterward at which they emphasized both the step forward in bilateral relations and the remaining political differences between the Cuban and U.S. governments. Kerry flew to Cuba in late July for a ceremony at which the flag of the United States was raised over the US Embassy in Havana. Cuban dissidents, however, were not invited to attend the flag raising ceremony. In September 2015, Cuban diplomat José Ramón Cabañas Rodríguez was appointed the first Ambassador of Cuba to the United States in 50 years.

=== Guantanamo Bay controversy ===
On January 28, 2015, while attending a meeting of Latin American leaders in San José, Costa Rica, Castro asserted that the United States should return the Guantanamo Bay Naval Base and lift the embargo on Cuba if relations were to be considered fully normalized. The White House responded the next day, saying that it had no intention to return the base. White House spokesman Josh Earnest indicated any such move is out of the question. "The President does believe that the prison at Guantánamo Bay should be closed down, but the naval base is not something that we wish to be closed."

=== Economic initiatives by the United States government ===
The United States government stated specific goals in improving trade with Cuba. Roberta Jacobson, an American diplomat, suggested bolstering Internet access and mobile phone service in Cuba to help its integration into the world economy. This provided American telecommunication companies including Verizon and Sprint with a new market in Cuba. By July 2016 US companies Airbnb and Netflix were operating in Cuba as well.

The United States sought to increase revenue from tourism in Cuba by lifting traveling restrictions which can be used for purchase of American agricultural and manufacturing exports to Cuba. Starwood became the first US company to sign a deal with Cuba since the 1959 revolution and agreed to manage two Havana hotels which had formerly been owned by the Cuban government. The first of these hotels opened three months later in June 2016.

=== Resumption of mail service and regular airline service ===
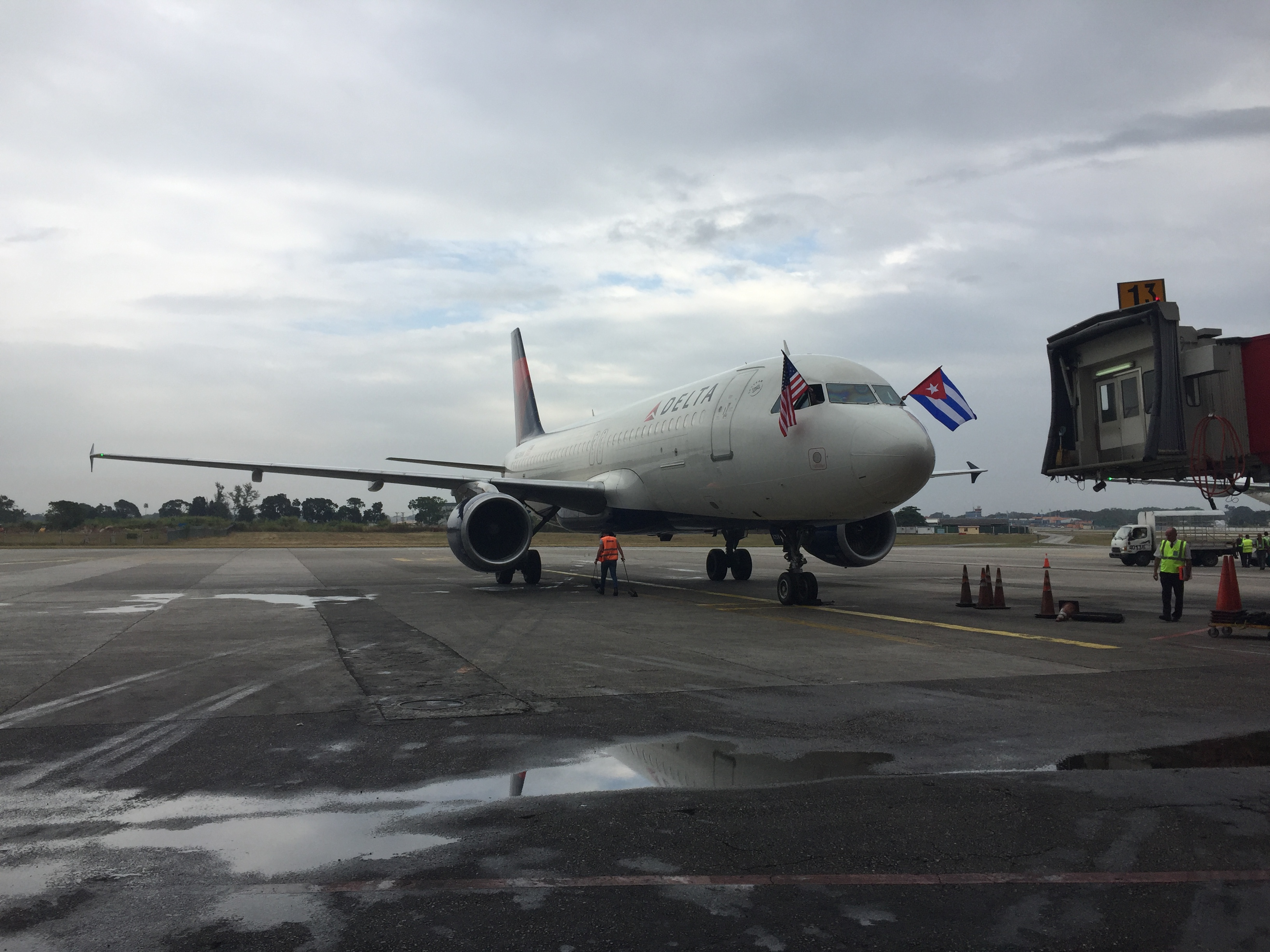
Delta Air Lines Flight 639, the airline's first flight to Cuba in 55 years, arriving at José Martí International Airport

The United States and Cuba agreed to restore postal service between the two countries for the first time since 1963. An agreement was reached to re-establish regularly scheduled flights between the U.S. and Cuba for the first time since the Cuban Missile Crisis. The agreement allowed for 110 flights per day. Eight US airline companies were given tentative approval to fly to airports in Cuba, limited to educational trips. On August 31, 2016, JetBlue became the first US commercial airline in more than 50 years to land a plane carrying US passengers at a Cuban airport when Flight 387 took off from Fort Lauderdale, Florida, and landed in Santa Clara, Cuba. By November 2017, however, several airline companies had quit doing flights to Cuba.

=== US presidential visit ===
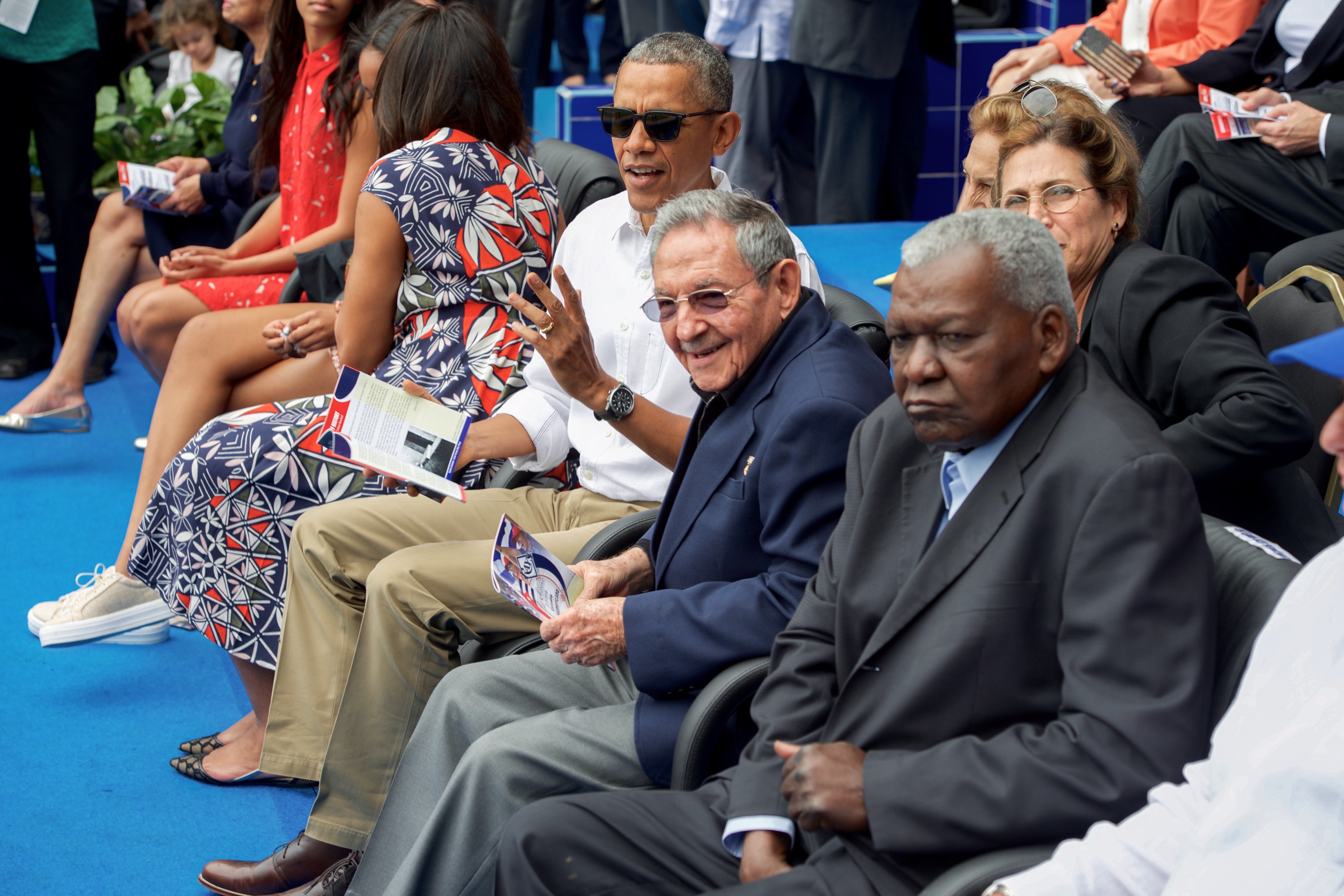
U.S. president Obama and Cuban leader Castro at Estadio Latinoamericano during Obama's visit to Havana

President Obama arrived in Cuba for a three-day visit on March 20, 2016. Obama headed a delegation of between 800 and 1,200, including businesspeople and congressional leaders who had helped in establishing the 2014 normalization deal. Obama was the first sitting U.S. president to visit Cuba since Calvin Coolidge in 1928. Obama said that he would only visit Cuba if he could meet with Cuban dissidents: "If I go on a visit, then part of the deal is that I get to talk to everybody. I've made it very clear in my conversations directly with Cuban leader Raúl Castro that we would continue to reach out to those who want to broaden the scope for, you know, free expression inside of Cuba."

=== Travel by sea ===
On May 1, 2016, the MV Adonia, a cruise ship operated by Carnival subsidiary Fathom Travel, departed from Miami and docked in Havana Bay, marking the first time in nearly 40 years that a U.S. passenger ship sailed from the U.S. to Cuba. Carnival said that the Adonia would go from Miami to Havana every other week. Two other Miami-based cruise lines, Royal Caribbean and Norwegian, were interested in running cruises to Cuba and sought Cuban government authorization. A number of Florida ferry companies received authorization from the U.S. Department of the Treasury to begin service to Cuba, but the companies were waiting on Cuban government permission.

In June 2019, the Trump administration made a policy reversal by banning cruise ship travel to Cuba.

== Domestic political responses ==
=== In Cuba ===
Raúl Castro, the First Secretary of the Communist Party of Cuba, served as the leader since 2011 and one of the leaders of the Cuban Revolution of the 1950s, declared in 2013 that "a slow and orderly transfer of the leadership of the revolution to the new generations" was already in progress. Castro pledged not to seek reelection in 2018. In announcing the agreement in December 2014, Castro struck a balance between praising the Marxist revolution that brought him and his brother Fidel to power almost 60 years prior and extolling the benefits that would be brought about by improved relations with the United States, namely the end of the Cuban embargo.

Fidel Castro appeared to welcome the thaw between Cuba and the United States in a statement published by Granma on January 26, 2015. Despite saying that he "does not trust United States policies", he stated, "We will always defend cooperation and friendship with all the peoples of the world, among them our political adversaries." However, later in 2016, Fidel Castro asserted his criticism of Obama, acknowledging his own anger with Obama's March trip to Cuba in which he called for Cubans to look toward the future. A week after the trip, Castro wrote a sternly worded letter admonishing Obama to read up on Cuban history, and declaring that "we don't need the empire to give us anything."

In December 2014, Raúl Castro publicly thanked Pope Francis and the Catholic Church for their role in the secret talks that led to the U.S.–Cuban prisoner exchange. According to Church officials within Cuba, several plans to build Catholic churches, which had been blocked since the revolution in 1959, were being processed. The first church was to be built in Sandino and was the first Catholic church to be built in Cuba since 1959.

At a CELAC meeting in 2015, Raúl Castro gave a speech claiming "Cuba will continue to defend the ideas for which our people have assumed the greatest sacrifices and risks." In that speech, he detailed the history of Cuba's foreign relations. He condemned the United States' history of manifest destiny, detailing a basic history of American and Cuban relations. He condemned United States' assistance in installing the "terrible dictatorships in 20 countries, 12 of them simultaneously", referring to the United States' supporting of Latin American dictatorships. Despite his prior backlash against the United States, Castro summarized his speech by praising the recent improvements in American-Cuban relations, and wondered why "the countries of the two Americas, the North and the South, fight together against terrorism, drug trafficking and organized crime, without politically biased positions."

=== In the United States ===
The Cuban thaw received a mixed reception among politicians in the United States. Prominent critics included Senator Marco Rubio of Florida. Rubio, a Cuban-American Republican, said that "diplomatic recognition [would] provide legitimacy to a government that doesn't deserve it."

Senator Bob Menendez, a Cuban-American Democrat from New Jersey and chairman of the Senate Foreign Relations Committee was an early critic of Obama's decision to normalize relations with Cuba. Writing in USA Today, Menendez criticized Obama "for compromising on bedrock U.S. values", charging that the Obama administration "has wrongly rewarded a totalitarian regime and thrown the Cuban regime an economic lifeline". Among the few other Democrats who have criticized Obama over the shift in relations with Cuba were Albio Sires and Debbie Wasserman-Schultz.

Congressional opponents of policy vowed to try to block its implementation, with Rubio announcing he would hold up the confirmation of any U.S. ambassador to Cuba whom Obama might nominate. Republican Senator Ted Cruz of Texas described the policy as a "tragic mistake." However, the Associated Press reported that business groups like the U.S. Chamber of Commerce would likely apply pressure on congressmen to accept the diplomatic thaw, and Republican Senator Jeff Flake of Arizona, a supporter of the shift, predicted many congressmen would come around.

Senator Rand Paul of Kentucky supported the thaw on the grounds that increased trade relations will benefit both Cubans and Americans. Senator Paul, in response to Senator Rubio, argued that "Senator Rubio is acting like an isolationist", and that, "The 50-year embargo just hasn't worked. If the goal is regime change, it sure doesn't seem to be working."

Obama's former Secretary of State Hillary Clinton strongly endorsed the decision. Clinton argued that the embargo "had propped up the Castro government because they could blame all of the country's problems on the United States. Moreover, the embargo did not have any impact on freedom of speech, freedom of expression, or on freeing political prisoners."

=== Public opinion ===
A survey conducted by Pew Research Center in January 2016 found that 63% of Americans approved of Obama's decision to re-establish diplomatic relations with Cuba, while 28% disapproved. The study found that Democrats (74%) and Independents (67%) were more likely to support the re-established relations; 40% of Republicans approved. The study also found that 66% of Americans supported ending the trade embargo against Cuba, while 28% disapproved. Support for both the re-establishment of relations and the lifting of the trade embargo was seen broadly amongst all racial and ethnic groups (62% of whites, 64% of blacks, and 65% of Hispanics) and amongst all age-brackets, however younger Americans were more likely to support it than older Americans. Americans who were college or university graduates (77%) overwhelmingly supported the restoration of relations, while people with only some college education (59%) or only high school education (53%) were less likely to support it. Despite broad support for the re-establishment of diplomatic relations and the end of the trade embargo, only 32% of Americans surveyed believed that Cuba would become "more democratic" over the next several years, with 60% believing the situation in Cuba would remain the same.

== International reactions ==
International reactions were overwhelmingly positive, with Radio Poland having reported that the Polish foreign ministry is encouraging Washington to go further and lift the embargo. China, one of Cuba's closest allies, welcomed the resumption of diplomatic relations between Cuba and the United States. Israel was one of the few countries not to issue a statement welcoming the change, and it was reported that the Israeli Foreign Ministry was "miffed" at having been caught off guard by the change. Cuba–Israel relations have been icy since the 1960s, and Israel has been the only country to consistently side with the US against UN resolutions criticizing the embargo.

Several Latin American leaders publicly welcomed the thaw, with Venezuelan President Nicolás Maduro hailing Obama's move toward normalization as a "valiant and historically necessary gesture", despite being a regular critic of U.S. policy. Colombian Liberal ex-President Ernesto Samper in his capacity as President of UNASUR said that "this was very good news, not only for Cuba but for the entire region". Juan Carlos Varela, the conservative President of Panama, said it would be possible to "achieve the dream of a united region".

The Canadian government, which maintained more positive relations with Cuba than the United States did during and after the Cold War, also responded favorably, with Foreign Minister John Baird suggesting to The Atlantic commentator Jeffrey Goldberg that the policy shift could help "transform" Cuba for the better.

== Perceptions in media and culture ==
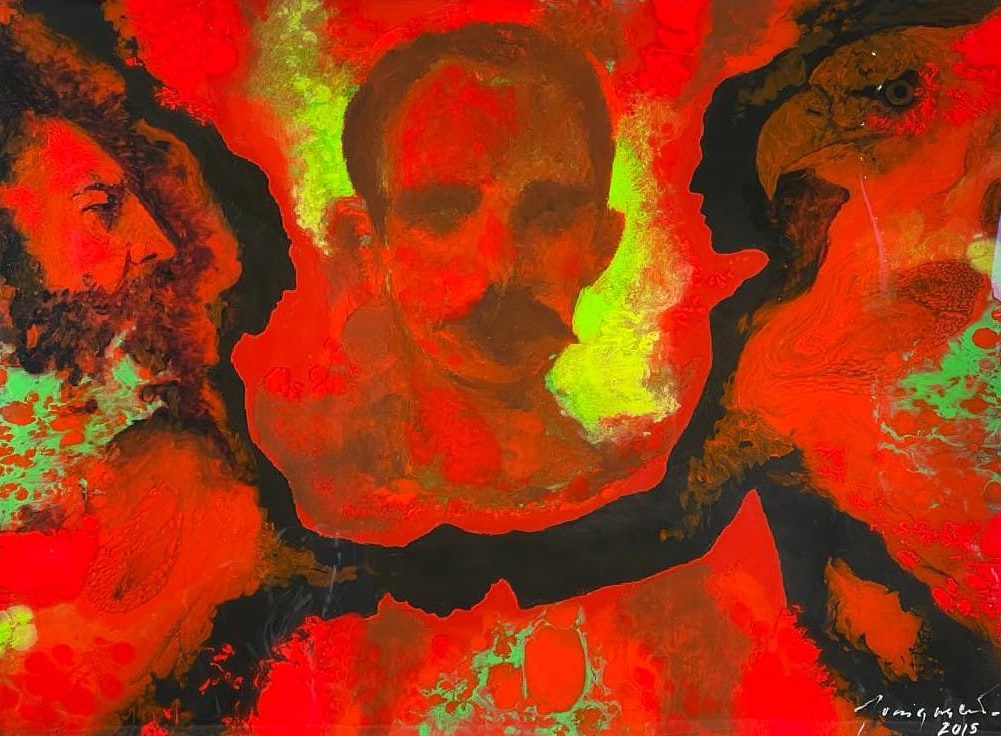
The Pact, 2015 by Josignacio, capturing the Cuban Thaw. Part of the permanent public collection of the Tampa Museum of Art.

Media sources, which were quick to dub the sudden turnaround in relations the "Cuban thaw", have predicted that it will lead to a wide variety of social and economic benefits for the two countries, as well as some less obvious impacts. Newsweek reported that the stock market jumped once elements of the Cuban thaw were reported. Reuters reported that the thaw would "make it more likely the Cuban government will extradite fugitives sought by U.S. officials." The Associated Press reported environmentalist concerns that the thaw would lead to the opening of "one of the most prolific oil and gas basins on the planet", which sits off the coast of Cuba. Bloomberg News reported that the thaw would even benefit Major League Baseball, with teams gaining opportunities to sign Cuban players. There were reports on how the Cuban thaw affected Cuban society, including its real estate market and greater emphasis on English language education.

The New Republic deemed the Cuban thaw to be "Obama's finest foreign policy achievement." The Indonesian journal Strategic Review proposed that Obama could follow the model of normalization of relations which his predecessor Bill Clinton had done with United States-Vietnam relations.

Granma, Cuba's state newspaper, published numerous articles regarding the Cuban thaw. It stated "International public opinion supports removal of Cuba from U.S. list of state sponsors of terrorism," and "[t]he decision is recognized as an important step in advancing President Obama's policy change to improve relations between the two countries." Additionally, they stated "[t]he Cuban government recognizes the just decision taken by the President of the United States to eliminate Cuba from a list on which it never should have been included" and reiterated that Cuba "rejects and condemns all acts of terrorism in all their forms and manifestations, as well as any action that is intended to instigate, support, finance or conceal terrorist acts."

In broader culture, the Cuban thaw served as inspiration the artwork The Pact by leading Cuban-American Contemporary artist Josignacio. Considered a significant work in his oeuvre, The Pact depicts the widely circulated media image of President Obama with Raúl Castro in Panama while adding the symbolic silhouettes of the American Bald Eagle, Fidel Castro, as well as the image of Cuban national hero José Martí. The work was acquired by the Tampa Museum of Art due to its cultural significance in capturing the historic resumption of diplomatic relations between both nations, as well as the historic links in Tampa to Cuba. The museum's acquisition of The Pact was covered by Diario Las Américas, the second oldest media outlet in the United States dedicated to Spanish-language readers.

== Aftermath ==
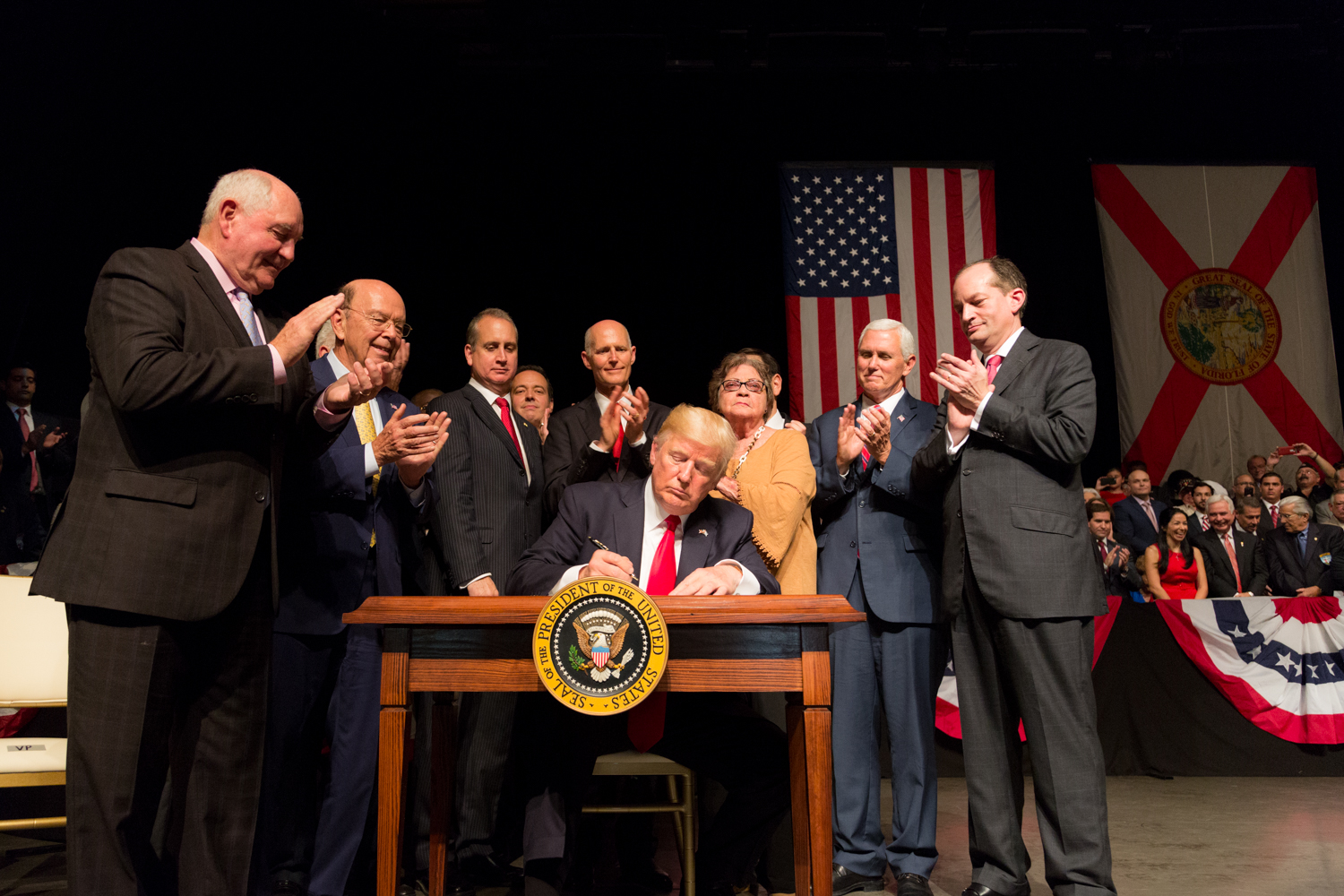
President Trump in Miami on June 16, 2017, signing new Cuban policy

The Obama administration's approach to Cuba was reversed by the U.S. government under Donald Trump. On June 16, 2017, President Trump issued a presidential memorandum reversing some aspects of the Obama administration's actions regarding U.S. relations with Cuba, and characterizing them as "terrible and misguided". He announced a prohibition on American money going to the Cuban military. In addition, he removed permission for individual "people-to-people" travel to Cuba by Americans, while leaving in place travel permission for organized "educational" groups, family visits and other categories. The Cuban Minister of Foreign Affairs, Bruno Rodríguez Parrilla, stated that the Cuban state "rejected" the sanctions, which it viewed as aiming to suffocate the island's economy and harm its living standards in order to achieve political concessions. In September 2019, further changes were made in relation to remittances.

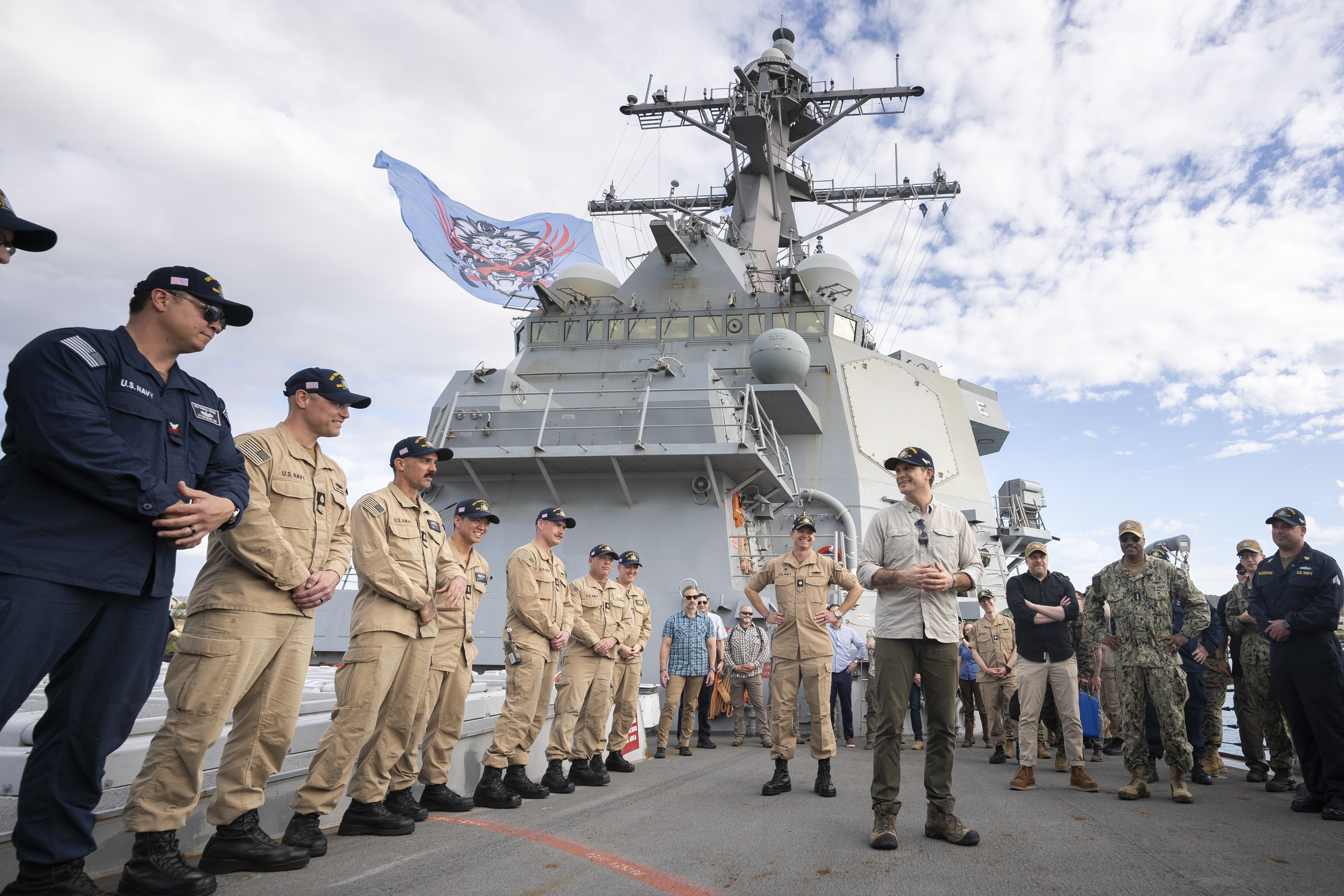
U.S. Defense Secretary Pete Hegseth aboard a ship on Guantanamo Bay Naval Base, 2025

The Biden administration had initially continued the sanctions from the Trump administration against Cuba. In May 2022, some of the sanctions were reversed, with policy changes such as expansion of flights to Cuba and resumption of a family reunification program. In 2024, the Treasury Department published details of President Biden's plan to support Cuba's private sector and internet freedom. On 14 January 2025, the Biden administration removed Cuba from the State Sponsors of Terrorism list, as part of a prisoner release deal; however, this was quickly reversed by the Trump administration. In addition to re-designating the island as a state sponsor of terrorism for a third time in 2025, the State Department announced further sanctions against Cuban military contractors and further restricted Cuba's access to the U.S. dollar. U.S. Homeland Security and Coast Guard soon thereafter restricted immigration of economic refugees from Cuba, along with Haiti, Nicaragua, and Venezuela. The U.S. re-activated Title III of the Helms–Burton Act, an international deterrent against foreign investment in Cuba. The U.S. government halted foreign aid funding, expanded visa restrictions, and formally cautioned against Cuban forced labor in February, referring to its international medical missions. President Trump issued a presidential directive in July for greater enforcement of the Cuban travel ban, further isolating the tourism industry of Cuba. The U.S. government banned Cuban leader Díaz-Canel along with two ministers from entering the U.S., later restricting access the Cuban luxury real estate sector.

== See also ==
- Khrushchev thaw
