= Cuban Five =

Cuban spies arrested in 1998 in the US

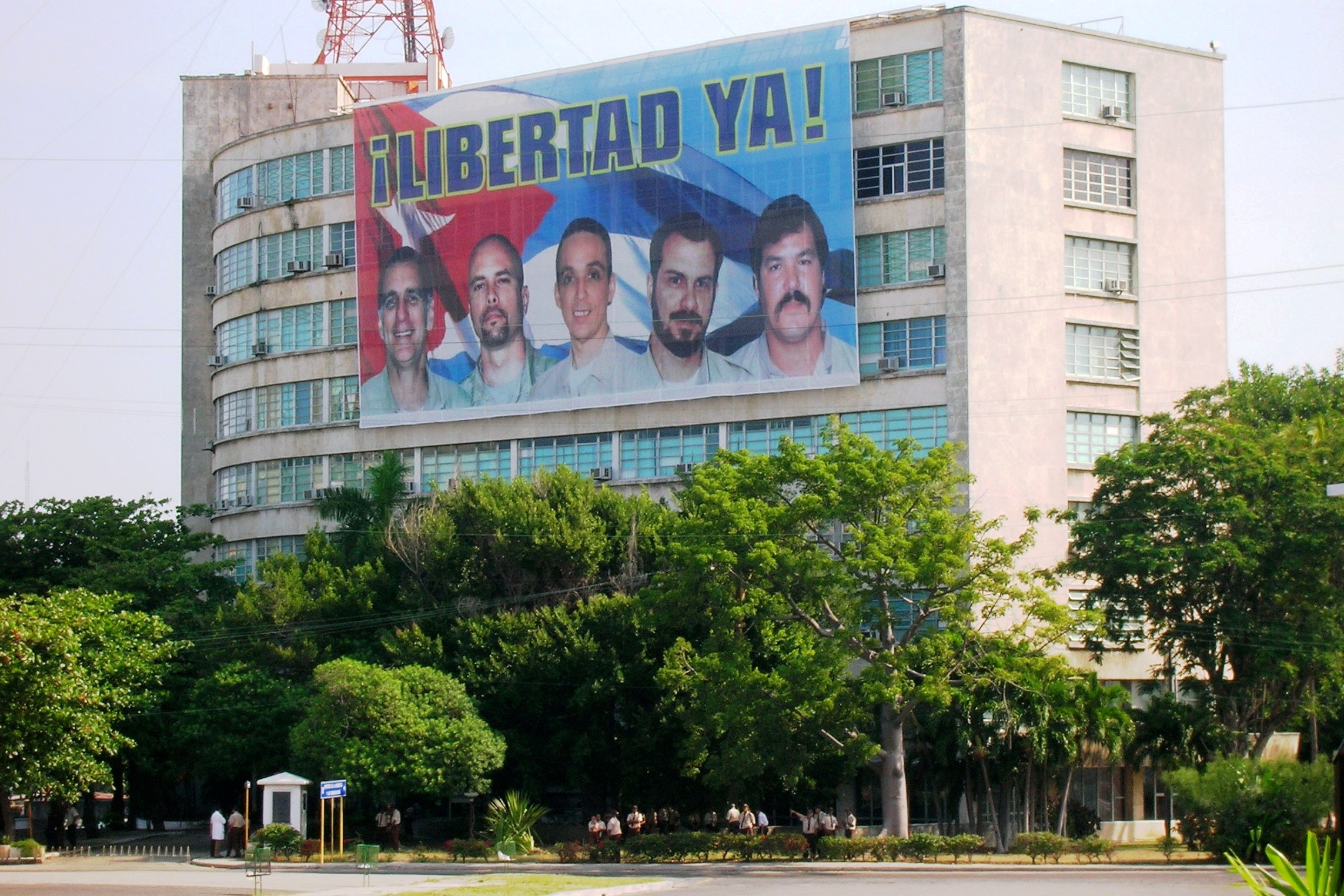
A poster in front of Plaza de la Revolución, Havana, calling for the release of the Cuban Five in 2007

The Cuban Five, also known as the Miami Five, are five Cuban intelligence officers (Gerardo Hernández, Antonio Guerrero, Ramón Labañino, Fernando González, and René González) who were arrested in September 1998 and later convicted in Miami, Florida, of conspiracy to commit espionage, conspiracy to commit murder, acting as an agent of a foreign government, and other illegal activities in the United States. The Five were in the U.S. to observe and infiltrate the Cuban-American groups Alpha 66, the F4 Commandos, the Cuban American National Foundation, and Brothers to the Rescue. They were part of La Red Avispa (lit. 'The Wasp Network') composed of at least 27 Cuban spies.

The Cuban government acknowledged that the five were intelligence agents in 2001, after denying it for three years. It said they were spying on Miami's Cuban exile community, not the U.S. government. Cuba says that the men were sent to South Florida in the wake of several terrorist bombings in Havana organized by anti-communist terrorist Luis Posada Carriles, a former Central Intelligence Agency operative.

The Five appealed their convictions, and concerns about the fairness of their trial received international attention. A three-judge panel of the Eleventh Circuit Court of Appeals in Atlanta overturned their convictions in 2005, citing the "prejudices" of Miami's anti-Castro Cubans, but the full court later denied the five's bid for a new trial and reinstated the original convictions. In June 2009 the U.S. Supreme Court declined to review the case. In Cuba, the Five are viewed as national heroes and portrayed as having sacrificed their liberty in the defense of their country.

René González was released from prison on October 7, 2011, having completed thirteen years of his sentence, with three years of probation in the U.S. remaining. He was allowed to return to Cuba for his father's funeral on April 22, 2013, and a federal judge allowed him to stay there provided that he renounce his U.S. citizenship. Fernando González was released on February 27, 2014. The remaining members were released on December 17, 2014, in a prisoner swap with Cuba for an American intelligence officer, identified by a senior American as Rolando Sarraff Trujillo. The exchange of prisoners coincided with Cuba's release of American contractor Alan Phillip Gross, although the governments characterized the release of Gross as being unrelated to the prisoner exchange. The release of the Cuban Five was broadly part of a temporary easing of relations between the U.S. and Cuba, known as the Cuban thaw.

== Background ==
In 1960s and 1970s, there were several attacks against Cuban civilians by U.S.-based exile groups such as Coordination of United Revolutionary Organizations (CORU), Alpha 66, and Omega 7. In a 2001 report by Cuba's Permanent Mission to the United Nations, the Cuban government cataloged 3,478 deaths as a result of "terrorism", "aggression", "acts of piracy and other actions". The events cited span the course of four decades and pertain to attacks such as the bombing of Cubana Flight 455 by men trained by the Central Intelligence Agency, the CIA-supported Bay of Pigs invasion, and the Escambray Rebellion between the government and anti-communist rebels in the Escambray Mountains (see also Operation Mongoose). As a result, the Cuban government had long sought to combat these groups. Their efforts include the use of spies sent to operate in the U.S. The Federal Bureau of Investigation (FBI) and other U.S. organizations had been monitoring the activities of Cuban spy suspects for more than 30 years.

== History ==
=== Activities ===
The "Cuban Five" were Cuban intelligence officers who were part of "La Red Avispa", or Wasp Network, which the FBI dismantled with 10 arrests in 1998.

The court found that they had infiltrated Brothers to the Rescue, a Miami-based organization that flew small aircraft over the Florida straits in efforts to rescue rafters fleeing Cuba, and had on some flights intentionally violated Cuban airspace and dropped leaflets. On February 24, 1996, two Brothers to the Rescue aircraft were shot down by Cuban military jets in international airspace while flying away from Cuban airspace, killing four U.S. citizens aboard.

The U.S. government also accused the remaining four of lying about their identities and sending 2,000 pages of unclassified information obtained from U.S. military bases to Cuba. The network received clandestine communications from Cuba via the Cuban Atención numbers station.

U.S. government organizations, including the FBI, had been monitoring Cuban spy activities for over 30 years, but made only occasional arrests. However, after the two Brothers to the Rescue aircraft were shot down by Cuban MiGs in February 1996 and four U.S. citizens were killed, on the basis of information sent to Cuba by an infiltrator of the group, the Clinton administration launched a crackdown. According to U.S. attorney José Pertierra, who acts for the Venezuelan government in its attempts to extradite Luis Posada Carriles, the crackdown was aided by the cooperation of the Cuban authorities with the FBI in 1997. The Cubans provided 175 pages of documents to FBI agents investigating Posada Carriles's role in the 1997 bombings in Havana, but the FBI failed to use the evidence to follow up on Posada. Instead, they used it to uncover the spy network that included the Cuban Five. He was not arrested until 1998.

At least two of the agents formed romantic relationships during their deployments. One married an American woman, while another proposed during a relationship that lasted at least a decade. After the agents were exposed, the spouse in the first case sued the Cuban government for rape on the basis that sexual intercourse had been procured by fraud.

== Arrests, convictions and sentences ==
All five were arrested in Miami on September 12, 1998, and were indicted by the U.S. government on 25 counts, including charges of false identification and conspiracy to commit espionage. Seven months later, Gerardo Hernández was indicted for conspiracy to commit murder in connection with the shoot-down of the Brothers to the Rescue aircraft.

The trial began in November 2000 in the U.S. District Court for Southern Florida in Miami and lasted seven months. In June 2001, the jury returned verdicts of guilty on all counts, including the charge of first-degree murder against Hernández.

In December 2001, the members of the group were sentenced to prison terms: two life terms for Hernández, to be served consecutively; life for Guerrero and Labañino; 19 years for Fernando González; and 15 years for René González. In addition, the prosecution sought the post-release deportation of the three Cuban-born members, and for the two US-born members, a post-release sentence of "incapacitation", imposing specific restrictions on them after their release, which would be enforced by the FBI. The restrictions would prohibit them from "associating with or visiting specific places where individuals or groups such as terrorists, members of organizations advocating violence, and organized crime figures are known to be or frequent."

In 2011, NPR reported some of the people associated with this group were imprisoned in a Communication Management Unit, a section within a federal prison that restricts and monitors all external communications.

=== Appeals ===
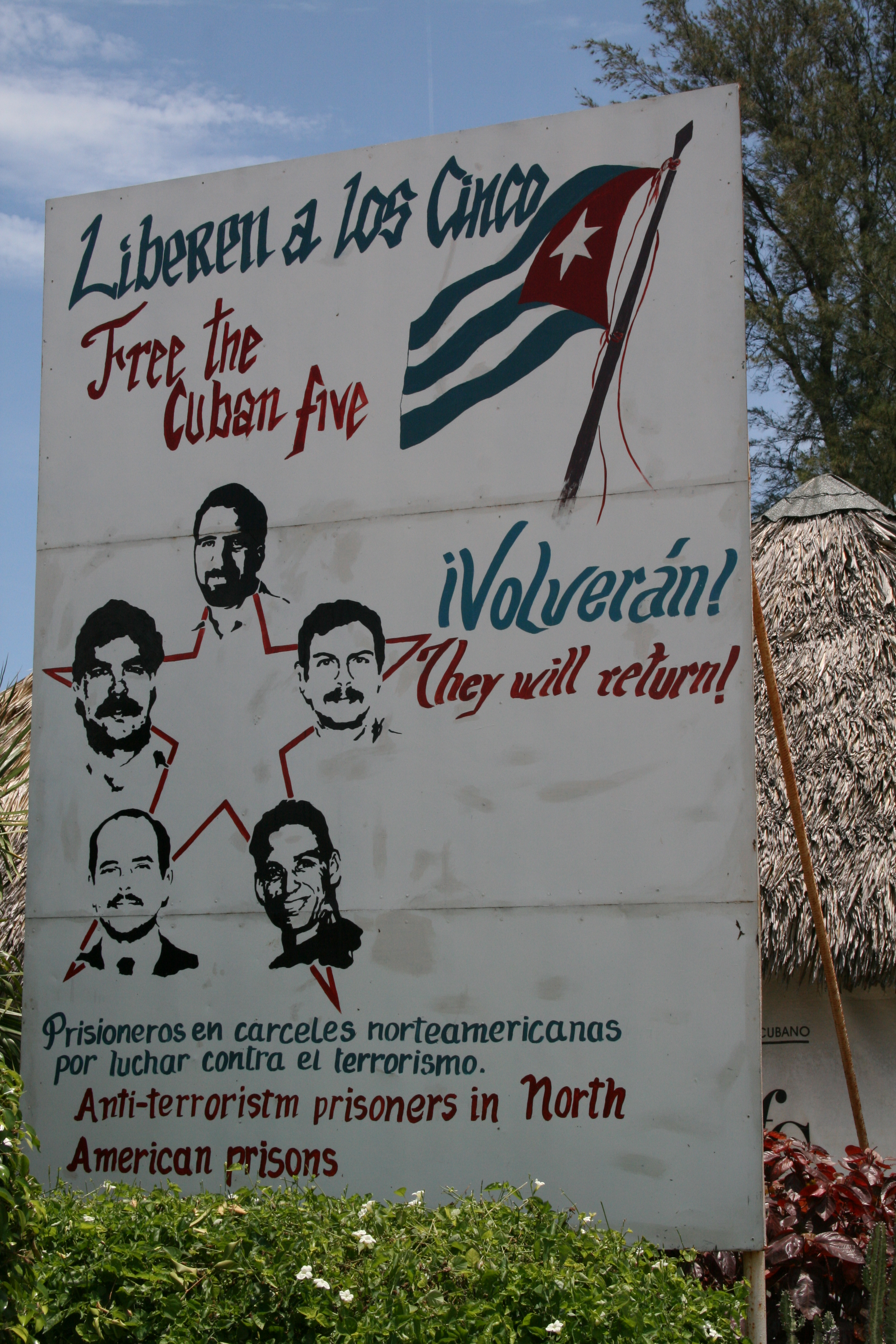
Sign supporting the "Cuban Five" in Varadero, Cuba

After the arrests, motions by the defense for a change of venue, on the basis that Miami was a venue too associated with exile Cubans, were denied, despite the fact that the trial began just five months after the heated Elian Gonzalez affair. The jury did not include any Cuban-Americans but 16 of the 160 members of the jury pool "knew the victims of the shootdown or knew trial witnesses who had flown with them." On August 9, 2005, a three-judge panel of the United States Court of Appeals for the Eleventh Circuit in Atlanta unanimously overturned the convictions and sentences of the Cuban Five and ordered a new trial outside Miami, saying that the Cuban exile community and the trial publicity made the trial unfavorable and prejudicial to the defendants. This was the first time a Federal Circuit Court of Appeals reversed a trial court's finding with respect to venue. However, on October 31, 2005, the Atlanta court agreed to a U.S. government request to review the decision, and in August 2006 the ruling for a new trial was reversed by a 10–2 vote of the Eleventh Circuit Court of Appeal sitting en banc. Charles R. Wilson wrote the opinion of the majority.

On June 4, 2008, a three-judge panel of the Eleventh Circuit Court of Appeals upheld the convictions of the "Five" but vacated and remanded for resentencing in district court the sentences of Guerrero, Labañino, and Fernando González. The court affirmed the sentences of Gerardo Hernández and René González. The court held that the sentencing judge had made six serious errors and remanded the case back to the same court. The decision was drawn up by William Pryor. In January 2009, the Five appealed to the U.S. Supreme Court. Twelve amicus curiae briefs were filed.

In May 2009, in response to the request for Supreme Court of the United States review of the panel decision by Judge Pryor, Solicitor General Elena Kagan, on behalf of President Barack Obama, filed a brief asking that the petition for a writ of certiorari be denied. On June 15, 2009, the Supreme Court denied review.

On October 13, 2009, Antonio Guerrero's sentence was reduced to 21 years and 10 months. On December 8, 2009, Ramón Labañino and Fernando González's sentences were reduced to 30 years and to 17 years and 9 months, respectively.

==== Plans for appeal ====
Cuban Five defense lawyer Leonard Weinglass died on March 23, 2011. Following his death, civil rights lawyer Martin Garbus took over the case. On June 13, 2012, Garbus held a press conference where he revealed a new strategy based upon proof that the United States government had paid numerous reporters and press outlets to create media pressure on the jurors to convict.

=== International criticism of the convictions, and U.S. response ===
Holding a trial for five Cuban intelligence agents in Miami is about as fair as a trial for an Israeli intelligence agent in Tehran. You'd need a lot more than a good lawyer to be taken seriously.

— Robert Pastor, President Jimmy Carter's national security adviser for Latin America

Following their conviction, there was an international campaign for the case to be appealed. In the United States, the campaign was most conspicuously represented by the National Committee to Free the Cuban Five which was represented in twenty U.S. cities and over thirty countries.

On May 27, 2005, the United Nations Commission on Human Rights adopted a report by its Working Group on Arbitrary Detention stating its opinions on the facts and circumstances of the case and calling upon the U.S. government to remedy the situation. Among the report's criticisms of the trial and sentences, section 29 stated:

29. The Working Group notes that it arises from the facts and circumstances in which the trial took place and from the nature of the charges and the harsh sentences handed down to the accused that the trial did not take place in the climate of objectivity and impartiality that is required in order to conform to the standards of a fair trial as defined in article 14 of the International Covenant on Civil and Political Rights, to which the United States of America is a party.

Amnesty International criticized the U.S. treatment of the Cuban Five as "unnecessarily punitive and contrary both to standards for the humane treatment of prisoners and to states' obligation to protect family life", as the wives of René González and Gerardo Hernández were denied visas to visit their imprisoned husbands.

The U.S. Government has responded to these claims, stating that the prisoners have received over a hundred visits from family members granted visas. The government contends that the wives of González and Hernández are members of the Cuban Intelligence Directorate, and thus pose a risk to the national security of the United States:

Consistent with the right of the United States to protect itself from covert spies, the U.S. government has not granted visas to the wives of two prisoners. Evidence presented at their husbands' trial revealed that one of these women was a member of the Wasp Network who was deported for engaging in activity related to espionage and is ineligible to return to the United States. The other was a candidate for training as a Directorate of Intelligence U.S.-based spy when U.S. authorities broke up the network.

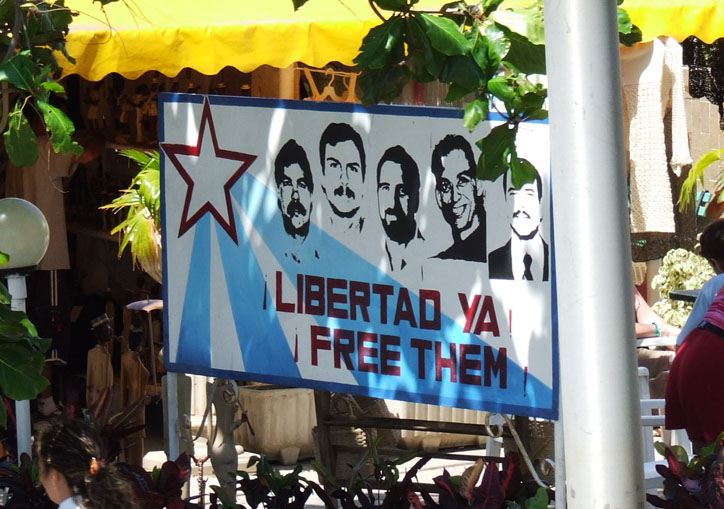
Sign on a street in Varadero, Cuba

Eight international Nobel Prize winners filed an amicus brief with the National Committee to Free the Cuban Five in 2009.

In the United Kingdom, among other actions, 110 Members of Parliament wrote an open letter to the U.S. Attorney General in support of the Five.

In April 2009, a Brazilian human rights group, Torture Never Again, awarded the Five its Chico Mendes Medal, alleging that their rights had been violated, declaring that "their mail is censored and their visiting rights are very restricted."

In 2011, Brazilian writer Fernando Morais wrote The Last Soldiers of the Cold War, about the Cuban Five. The book is based on over 40 interviews and documents of the governments of United States and Cuba. Martin Garbus, the attorney representing the Cuban Five, has released a book about the case titled North of Havana, The Untold Story of Dirty Politics, Secret Diplomacy, and the Trial of the Cuban Five.

=== Release ===
René González was put on parole for three years starting 2011. He was allowed to return to Cuba for his father's funeral on April 22, 2013, with the understanding that he would return to Florida to fulfill his three years of probation, but on May 3 a federal judge ruled that he could remain in Cuba provided that he renounce his United States citizenship.

In May 2012, it was reported that the U.S. had declined an exchange of prisoners proposed by the Cuban government, that would have seen the Cuban Five returned to Cuba in exchange for USAID contractor Alan Gross, imprisoned in Cuba for illegally distributing communications equipment. American officials did not consider Gross, whom they viewed as unjustly detained for a comparatively minor offense, equivalent to spies, one of whom had been convicted of murder.

Fernando González was released on February 27, 2014. He returned to Cuba and campaigned for the release of the remaining three.

As secret negotiations toward an exchange of prisoners proceeded, U.S. Senator Patrick J. Leahy, while on a trip to visit Gross in prison, met with Adriana Pérez O'Connor, whose husband Hernández was in prison for life. She asked him to arrange a way for her to become pregnant by her husband. Leahy made her case to U.S. officials, who arranged for Hernández to provide his sperm for artificial insemination. When Pérez became pregnant, officials negotiating the prisoner exchange worried that her pregnancy would make their dealings public before they were ready to announce a deal. Leahy reported that prison conditions for Gross improved after he had assisted Pérez and Hernández.

The prisoner exchange took place in December 2014 as part of a broader agreement to move toward the normalization of Cuba–United States relations. In addition to the three remaining Cubans who were returned to Cuba, Rolando Sarraff Trujillo, a Cuban who had worked as an agent for American intelligence until his arrest in November 1995 was returned to the United States. Sarraff was described as a key figure in Cuban intelligence, a cryptologist who provided the Central Intelligence Agency with information that helped the CIA arrest Cuban spies long after Sarraff's arrest and imprisonment. The exchange of prisoners coincided with Cuba's release of American contractor Alan Phillip Gross, jailed in Cuba since December 2009, although both governments characterized the release of Gross as unrelated to the prisoner exchange.

== See also ==
- Foreign Agents Registration Act
- Ana Montes – Cuban spy sentenced to a 25-year prison term in the United States
- UK undercover policing relationships scandal – other intelligence officers whose relationships with unsuspecting victims resulted in litigation
