= Alan Gross =

American government contractor

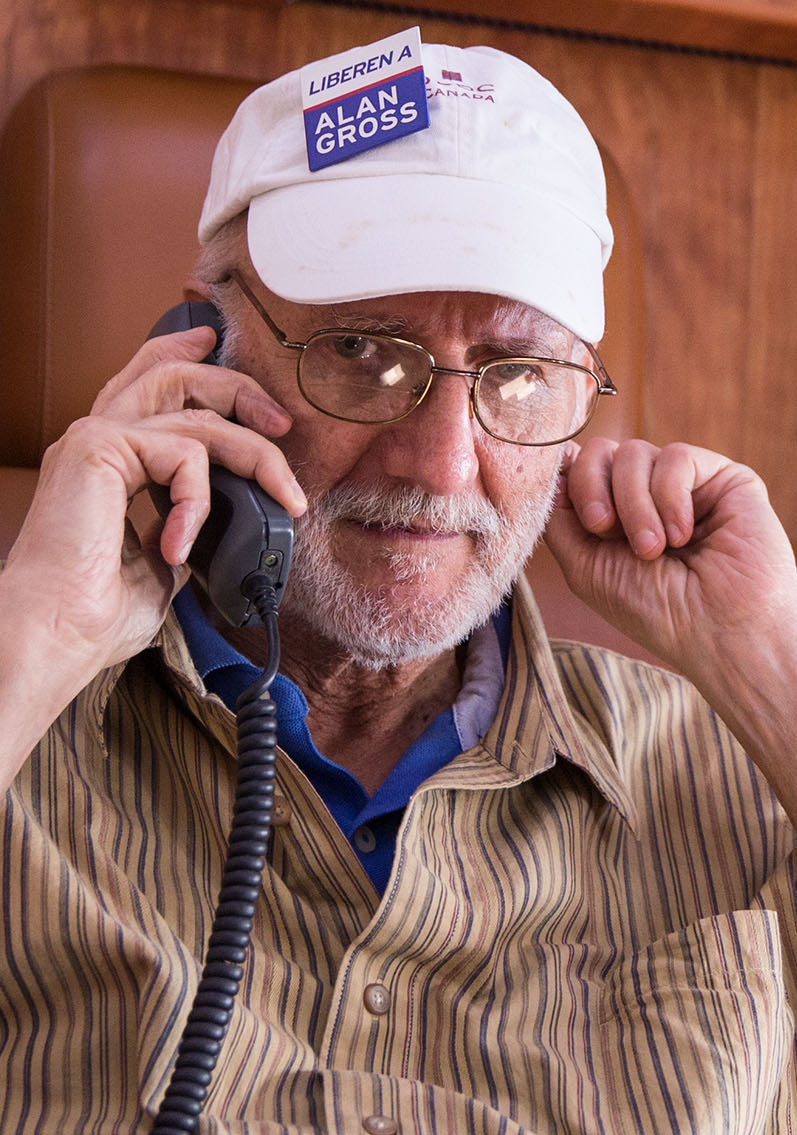
- Alan Gross talking on the phone with President Barack Obama, 2014
- Born: Alan Phillip Gross; May 2, 1949 (age 77); Rockville Centre, New York, U.S.
- Occupation: United States government contractor employed by U.S. Agency for International Development
- Spouse: Judith Gross
- Status: Released
- Penalty: 5 years in prison for importing banned technology with the intent of establishing clandestine Internet service

Details
- Imprisoned at: Carlos J. Finlay Military Hospital, Havana

Alan Phillip Gross (born May 2, 1949) is a former United States government contractor employed by the United States Agency for International Development (USAID).

In December 2009 he was arrested in Cuba while working on a program funded under the 1996 Helms–Burton Act, which explicitly called for overthrow of Castro's government. He was prosecuted in 2011 after being accused of crimes against the Cuban state for furtively bringing military-grade communication equipment designed to evade detection to members of Cuba's Jewish community. After being accused of working for American intelligence services in January 2010, he was convicted of spying and for "acts against the independence or the territorial integrity of the state" in March 2011. US sources widely rejected the idea that Gross was a spy, though some noted the "covert" nature of Gross's work. Gross noted in his field reports his awareness of the risks he was taking in his mission. He was released from Cuban prison on December 17, 2014, and returned to the US in exchange for the release and return of three Cubans convicted of espionage.

While serving his prison sentence, his wife Judy Gross, sued Development Alternatives Incorporated (DAI) and USAID for $60 million in federal court. The company settled for an undisclosed sum. The amount is in addition to the $3.2 million that USAID agreed to pay Gross and DAI in November 2014, a month before his release. Gross has since moved to Israel.

== Life and career ==
Gross was born in Rockville Centre, New York. He was raised at his hometown and in Baltimore. He studied sociology at the University of Maryland and social work at Virginia Commonwealth University, before moving to Potomac, Maryland. He had a long career as an international development worker who had been active in some 50 countries and territories across the Middle East, Africa and Europe, including Iraq and Afghanistan, where he was setting up satellite communications systems to NGOs.

In 2001, he founded JBDC LLC, a small company that earned less than $70,000 in 2009, which supported "Internet connectivity in locations where there [is] little or no access," according to The New York Times. Gross and his wife Judy lived in Potomac, Maryland, a Washington, D.C. suburb. The couple have two daughters, Shira and Nina.

== Arrest and trial ==
=== Background ===
Gross was working as a subcontractor to Development Alternatives Inc. (DAI), the prime contractor working with USAID, which had won a $6 million U.S. government contract for the program in which Gross was involved, a controversial "democracy-promotion program" that ballooned under the George W. Bush administration, to provide communications equipment to break the Cuban government's 'information blockade.' Gross received less than $300,000. He spoke little Spanish and had not worked in Cuba before.

USAID's $20 million Cuba program, authorized by a law calling for regime change in Cuba, has been criticized in congressional reports, which called it wasteful and ineffective and accused it of putting people in danger. Funding was held up briefly in 2010 over concerns following Gross's arrest.

According to American officials, Gross visited Cuba four times in five months in 2009 on a tourist visa before his arrest to deliver computer and satellite equipment to three Jewish community groups. In December 2009, according to DAI, he was on a follow-up trip researching how the groups were making use of the equipment he had previously distributed to them. As reported by The Jewish Daily Forward, Cuba's small Jewish community, numbering fewer than 2,000 people who mainly live in Havana, enjoys full religious freedom, the possibility to emigrate to Israel and fairly good relations with the government under Raúl Castro, but has little influence, making observers wonder why the United States provides material to them under a USAID program that usually targets dissidents. According to a Latin America specialist for the Council on Foreign Relations, it is possible that Gross's mission was useful only inasmuch as it satisfied Congressional demands to take action in Cuba.

In January 2012, it was reported that Cuban authorities claimed that Gross has visited Cuba as early as 2004, delivering a video camera to a leading Freemason who later declared that he had been a Cuban intelligence agent since 2000.

Gross filed reports for DAI of his four visits to Cuba in 2009. The report of the fifth and final trip was written by DAI. A review of the reports was revealed on February 12, 2012, by the Associated Press (AP). According to the reports, Gross was aware of the risks he was taking. AP reports that Gross did not identify himself as a representative of the U.S. government, but claimed to be a member of a Jewish humanitarian group. To escape Cuban authorities' detection, he enlisted the help of American Jews to transport electronic equipment, instructing them to pack items a piece at a time in carry-on luggage, and also traveled with American Jewish humanitarian groups undertaking missions on the island so he could intercede with Cuban authorities if questions arose. Gross declared that he was thoroughly inspected by the customs officials at Jose Marti International Airport when entering the country and that he declared all of the items in his possession. The equipment he brought to Cuba on his fourth trip, most but not all of which is legal in Cuba, included 12 iPods, 11 BlackBerry Curve smartphones, three MacBooks, six 500-gigabyte external drives, three satellite modems known as BGANs, three routers, three controllers, 18 wireless access points, 13 memory sticks, three VoIP phones, and networking switches. In his report on this trip, marked as final, he summarized: "Wireless networks established in three communities; about 325 users". However, he went to Cuba for a fifth time in late November 2009 and was arrested 11 days later. When he was arrested, he was carrying a high-tech chip, intended to keep satellite phone transmissions from being located within 250 miles (400 kilometres). The chip is not available on the open market. It is provided most frequently to the CIA and the United States Department of Defense, but can also be obtained by the United States Department of State, which oversees USAID. Asked how Gross obtained the card, a USAID spokesman said that the agency played no role in helping Gross acquire equipment.

=== Arrest ===
Gross was arrested on December 3, 2009, at the El Presidente Hotel, where he was staying. He was jailed first at Carlos J. Finlay Military Hospital, then Villa Marista prison, a detention center. According to leaked classified U.S. diplomatic cables, the arrest came amid heightened tensions between Cuba and the U.S. Gross spent 25 days in jail before receiving his first visit from a U.S. diplomat, but was visited by a Cuban attorney earlier and was allowed to telephone his wife four days after his arrest on December 6 for the first time and again on December 23. During the one-hour visit by the representative of the United States Interests Section in Havana on December 28, 2009, Gross stated that Cuban officials were "treating him 'with respect," though his interrogation had been "very intense at first," lasting an average of two hours a day. According to the cable, the cell Gross had to share with two other men had a TV and a fan.

The attorney who visited Gross in jail, Armanda Nuria Piñero Sierra, was hired as Gross's lawyer and handled his trial and appeals. She also represented the families of five Cubans held in U.S. prisons after being convicted in 2001 on charges of conspiracy to commit espionage against U.S. military installations, leading to the immediate speculation after Gross's arrest that Cuba wanted to swap him for the five. In October 2011, it was revealed that the U.S. State Department had offered to let one of them who had been released from prison in the U.S. on probation serve the remainder of his probation in Cuba in exchange for Gross's release.

U.S. Congresswoman Ileana Ros-Lehtinen said Gross's treatment was an attempt by Cuba to get a "concession". Many Jewish groups, including the Conference of Presidents of Major American Jewish Organizations and the American Jewish Committee, protested against his detention.

=== Charges ===
In January 2010, Ricardo Alarcón, the president of the Cuban National Assembly, claimed that Gross was "contracted to work for American intelligence services," which was denied by both the U.S. government and Gross's attorneys. More than a year later, in February 2011, Gross was charged not with espionage but with "acts against the independence and territorial integrity of the state" ("Actos Contra la Independencia o la Integridad Territorial del Estado"), a crime punishable by up to 20 years in prison. Gross's trial was set for March 4, 2011.

=== Sentencing ===
On March 12, 2011, Gross was sentenced to 15 years in prison. According to the Cuban News Agency, he had been part of a "subversive project of the U.S. government that aimed to destroy the Revolution through the use of communication systems out of the control of authorities." Gross's wife and her U.S. attorney, along with three U.S. officials in the capacity as observers, attended the trial.

Gross's case was appealed to the Supreme Court of Cuba, which affirmed the sentence in August 2011.

=== Reactions and advocacy ===
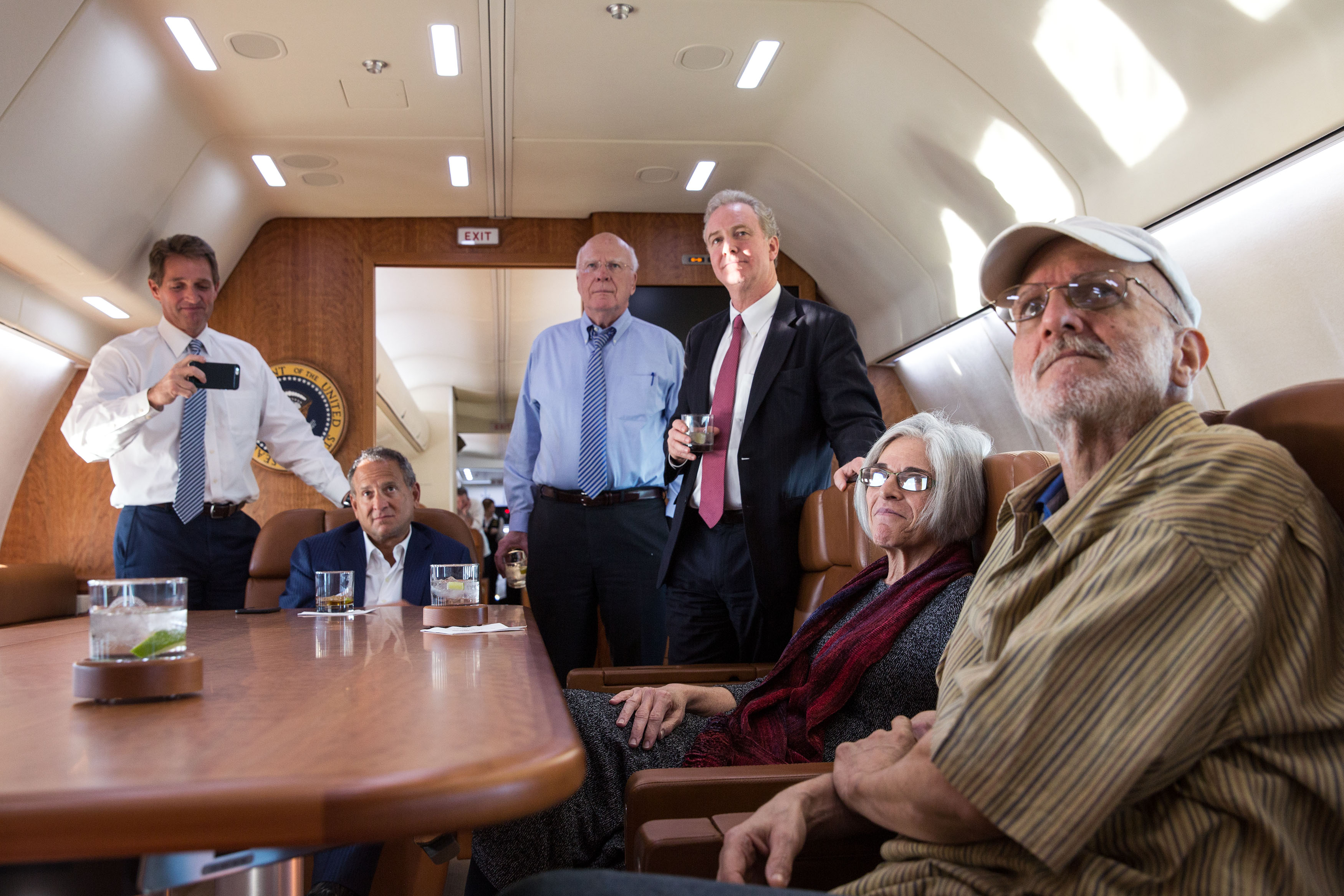
Alan Gross with his wife Judy, attorney Scott Gilbert, Rep. Chris Van Hollen, D-Md., Sen. Patrick Leahy, D-Vt., and Sen. Jeff Flake, R-Ariz. watch television on board a U.S. government plane headed back to the U.S. as the news breaks of his release, Dec. 17, 2014.

After the sentence was passed, Gross's American attorney, Peter J. Kahn, said in a written statement: "The Gross family is devastated by the verdict and harsh sentence announced today by the Cuban authorities. Having already served a 15-month sentence in a Cuban prison, Alan and his family have paid an enormous personal price in the long-standing political feud between Cuba and the United States." Kahn pledged to "continue to work with Alan's Cuban attorney in exploring any and all options available to him, including the possibility of an appeal." He also called for Gross's immediate release on humanitarian grounds.

U.S. National Security Council spokesman Tommy Vietor responded to the ruling, saying that it "adds another injustice to Alan Gross's ordeal," and that "he has already spent too many days in detention and should not spend one more," and asked for "the immediate release of Mr. Gross so that he can return home to his wife and family."

U.S. Secretary of State Hillary Clinton told reporters that Gross had been "unjustly jailed for far too long ... He needs to be able to leave Cuba and return home," adding "this is a matter of great personal pain to his family and concern to the U.S. government."

Several members of Congress visited Cuba to see Gross.

The Jewish community and others called on Pope Benedict XVI to appeal to Raul Castro during his visit to Cuba in March 2012 to release Gross.

Gross's wife, after fighting to persuade the organized Jewish community to rally behind a humanitarian campaign to free her husband, publicly criticized President Barack Obama and U.S. policy toward Cuba. In a March 13, 2012 interview with Politico, after having hired the public relations company Burson-Marsteller on the State Department′s recommendation, she called her husband a "pawn" in a "failed policy" between the Cuban and American governments, adding "the trial wasn't about him. It was about USAID and U.S. policy towards Cuba." Gross reportedly insisted that his "goals were not the same as the program that sent [him]," and called on the Obama administration to meet Cuba at the negotiating table to solve bilateral issues between the two states, including his case.

== Incarceration ==
In April 2014, he went on a hunger strike for nine days.

In August 2014, his wife reported on their official website, www.bringalanhome.org, that Gross refused to see her or their daughter when they went to see him in Cuba, and also refused to see visitors from the U.S. Interests Section in Havana, such as U.S. diplomats. In August 2014, his wife and daughter wrote on their official website that Gross told them not to visit him again and in December 2014 it was reported that they had not.

Gross was housed in the Carlos J. Finlay Military Hospital with two other inmates who spoke Spanish. Gross reportedly spoke some Spanish.

It was reported in December 2014 that Gross refused to be treated by doctors in Cuba and had threatened to go on hunger strikes if he was not unconditionally released.

To fight the boredom, Gross developed a deep passion for digital art. Using the computer he was given as part of a quid-pro-quo deal between the U.S. and Canada, he began experimenting with Microsoft PowerPoint and Paint (both in Spanish). Over the course of his incarceration, he ended up making over 2,000 pieces of art. Some of his favorite pieces include: "Finlay 1", "Villa Marista", and "Hay No Mucho Tiempo", among others.

=== Health ===
When arrested, Gross weighed 254 pounds (115 kg). From the start of his incarceration, he lost considerable body weight. Gross refused medical and dental care. According to his wife and attorney, Gross's health had deteriorated during his incarceration and this was a reason to release him immediately. They also claimed he had degenerative arthritis and had difficulty walking. In May 2012, a mass developed on his right shoulder, which was diagnosed by Cuban doctors as a hematoma (collection of blood). Gross's family hired a U.S. radiologist who claimed that the mass was improperly diagnosed, and that Gross could be suffering from cancer so Gross should be released on that basis. Gross's former lawyer, Jared Genser, issued a press release saying he had filed a petition with the United Nations Special Rapporteur on Torture. At the same time, "extremely concerned about Alan Gross's health," the U.S. State Department called for Gross's immediate release.

Meanwhile, the president of the Hebrew Community of Cuba (Spanish: "Casa de la Comunidad Hebrea de Cuba"), Adela Dworin, who visited Gross in jail several times, claimed that Gross "looked very agile" and was not particularly worried about the mass on his shoulder. In November 2012, the Miami Herald reported that New York Rabbi Elie Abadie, who is also a physician, told the Associated Press that "Alan Gross does not have any cancerous growth at this time, at least based on the studies I was shown and based on the examination, and I think he understands that also," after personally examining Gross and receiving a briefing from a team of Cuban physicians who attended him.

The Cuban Foreign Affairs Ministry, in a statement detailing a meeting between diplomats of the U.S. Interests Section in Havana, a doctor and nurse from the U.S. mission, and members of the Cuban medical team that presented the results of the biopsy performed on the lesion behind Gross's right shoulder, confirmed that the hematoma was not cancerous. The Cuban Government also maintained that Gross's health was normal for a man his age and that he was being properly treated after having stated a few months earlier that Gross, who was held at a military hospital, "could be held at any prison facility," meaning that he was in good and stable health.

In December 2014, Gross released a statement complaining that his teeth had fallen out and that he had lost weight while at the same time stating that he was refusing all medical and dental care because he wanted to be immediately released from prison.

== Lawsuits ==
In November 2012, Gross and his wife Judith sued DAI and USAID for failing to adequately prepare, train and supervise him given the dangerous nature of the program's activities. Reportedly, they were seeking $60 million compensatory damages. In November 2013, it was announced that DAI and Gross and his wife had reached a confidential settlement.

Gross and his wife filed another lawsuit, reportedly seeking $10 million from Gross's insurer, the Federal Insurance Company, for benefits they say the company had denied.

== Release ==
In November 2014, The New York Times called for the United States to engage in a prisoner swap with Cuba. On December 17, 2014, the Cuban government released Gross on humanitarian grounds and allowed him to return to the United States on a U.S. government plane. Some members of the Cuban Five were also released on December 17, 2014, although the governments characterized the two releases as being unconnected. This exchange was part of the larger Cuban thaw, which occurred for a brief period towards the end of the Obama administration, and which saw improvements in diplomatic and trade relations between the United States and Cuba.
