= 1997 Cuba hotel bombings =

Series of bombings by anti-Communist militants

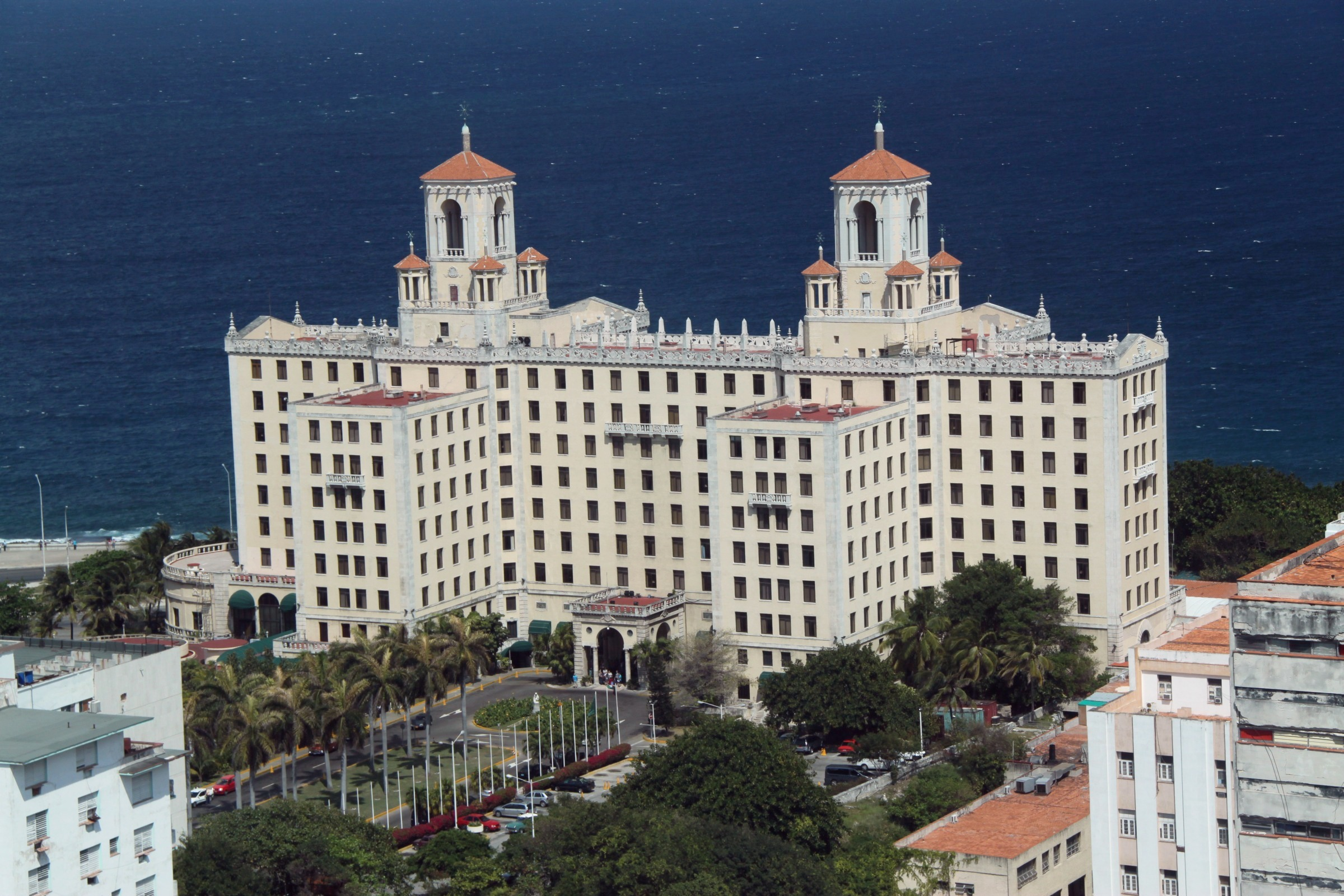
- Hotel Nacional de Cuba
- Location: Havana, Cuba
- Date: September 4, 1997; 11:30 hours (CST)
- Target: Cuban tourist industry
- Attack type: C-4 bombs
- Deaths: 1 (Fabio di Celmo)
- Injuries: 11
- Perpetrators: Luis Posada Carriles; Raúl Ernesto Cruz León; Otto René Rodríguez Llerena; Francisco Chávez Abarca
- Motive: Anti-communism

The 1997 Cuba hotel bombings were a series of terrorist bombing attacks on Cuban hotels organized by anti-Communist militants. The purpose of the bombing campaign was to destroy the recently resurgent Cuban tourism trade and in so doing, undermine the country's Communist government.

== Events ==
The first and worst of the explosions took place at the Hotel Copacabana at about 11:30 AM (local time) on 4 September, and killed Fabio di Celmo, a 32-year-old Genoan, from Italy, and resident of Montreal, according to the Italian Foreign Ministry. Di Celmo was visiting Cuba with his father and staying in the hotel. Eleven other tourists were also injured in the bombings. The hotels targeted included the Hotel Capri, Hotel Nacional de Cuba, and the Meliá Cohiba Hotel.

== Responsibility ==
Cuban-exile and former CIA asset, Luis Posada Carriles, admitted organizing the bombings. In a taped interview with The New York Times, Posada said: "It is sad that someone is dead, but we can't stop." Posada was reportedly disappointed with the reluctance of American news organisations to report the bombing attacks, saying "If there is no publicity, the job is useless".

In March 1999 Raúl Ernesto Cruz León, who Posada admitted was a mercenary under his employment, was sentenced to death by the Cuban authorities after admitting to the attacks, alongside fellow Salvadoran Otto René Rodríguez Llerena. The sentences were commuted in 2010 to 30 years in prison. He was released on 30 December 2024. In December 2010 another Salvadoran, Francisco Chávez Abarca, was sentenced to 30 years for his part in the bombings, having confessed on television to being hired by Posada Carriles.

In March 2005 Posada entered the US on a false passport and requested political asylum. Presidents Fidel Castro of Cuba and Hugo Chávez of Venezuela both demanded extradition. He lived in Miami until he was detained by homeland security following an interview he gave to the Miami Herald, in which he claimed to have entered the US without papers. He was then placed under house arrest. In September 2005 a US immigration judge ruled he could not be extradited to Venezuela or Cuba as he faced the threat of torture in these countries. In January 2009 Posada was indicted on charges of obstruction of justice, immigration fraud, and perjury by a federal grand jury. He was cleared on all counts in April 2011.

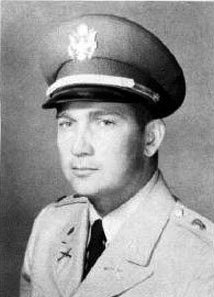
Luis Posada Carriles in uniform of the United States Army, during his stay at Fort Benning, Georgia, in 1962.

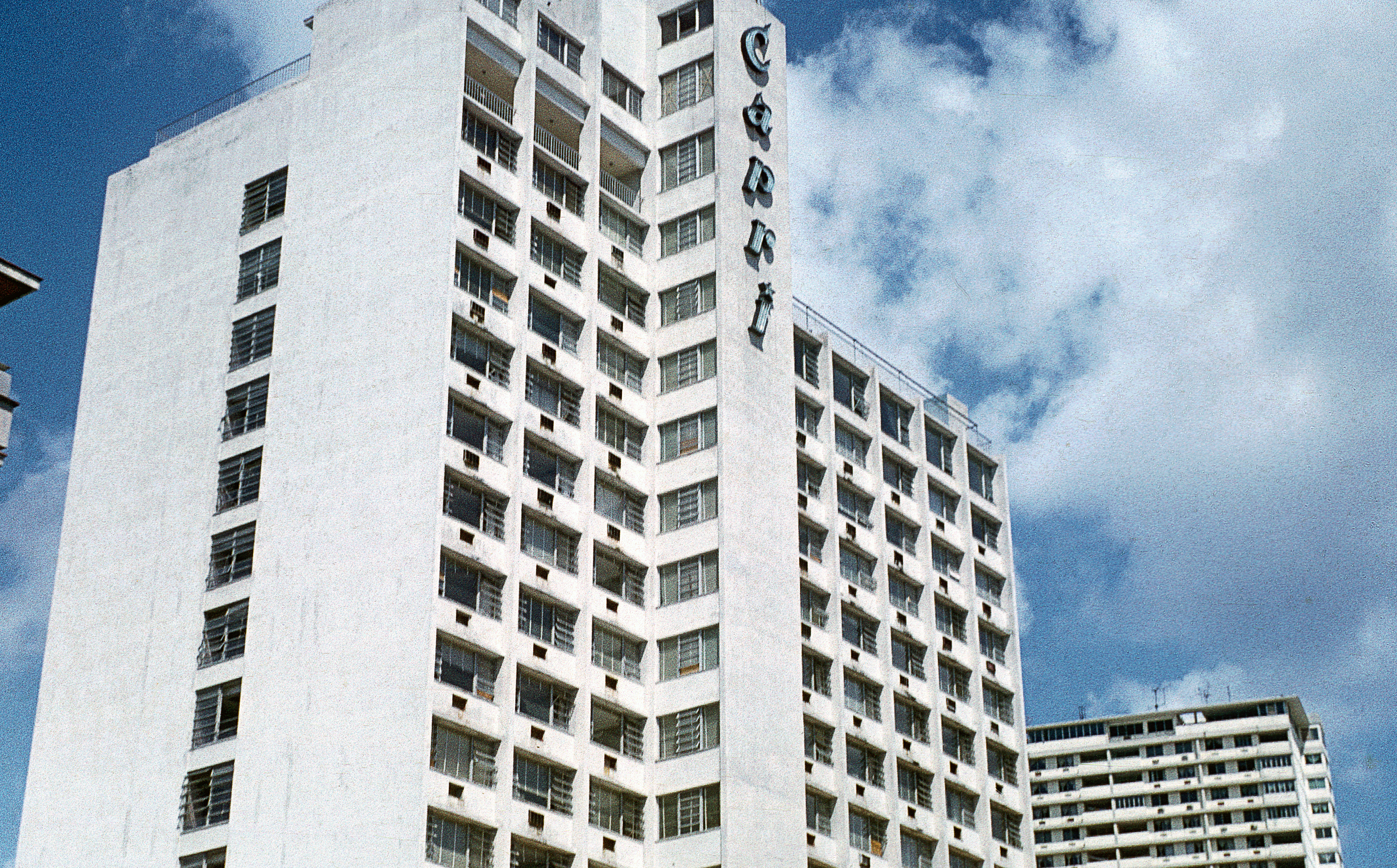
Capri Hotel in 1973.

== See also ==
- Cuban Five
- 1996 shootdown of Brothers to the Rescue aircraft

== In popular culture ==
=== Film ===
- Wasp Network, 2019.

=== Literature ===
- The Last Soldiers of the Cold War by Fernando Morais, 2011.
