= 1996 shootdown of Brothers to the Rescue aircraft =

Downing of two unarmed aircraft in Cuba

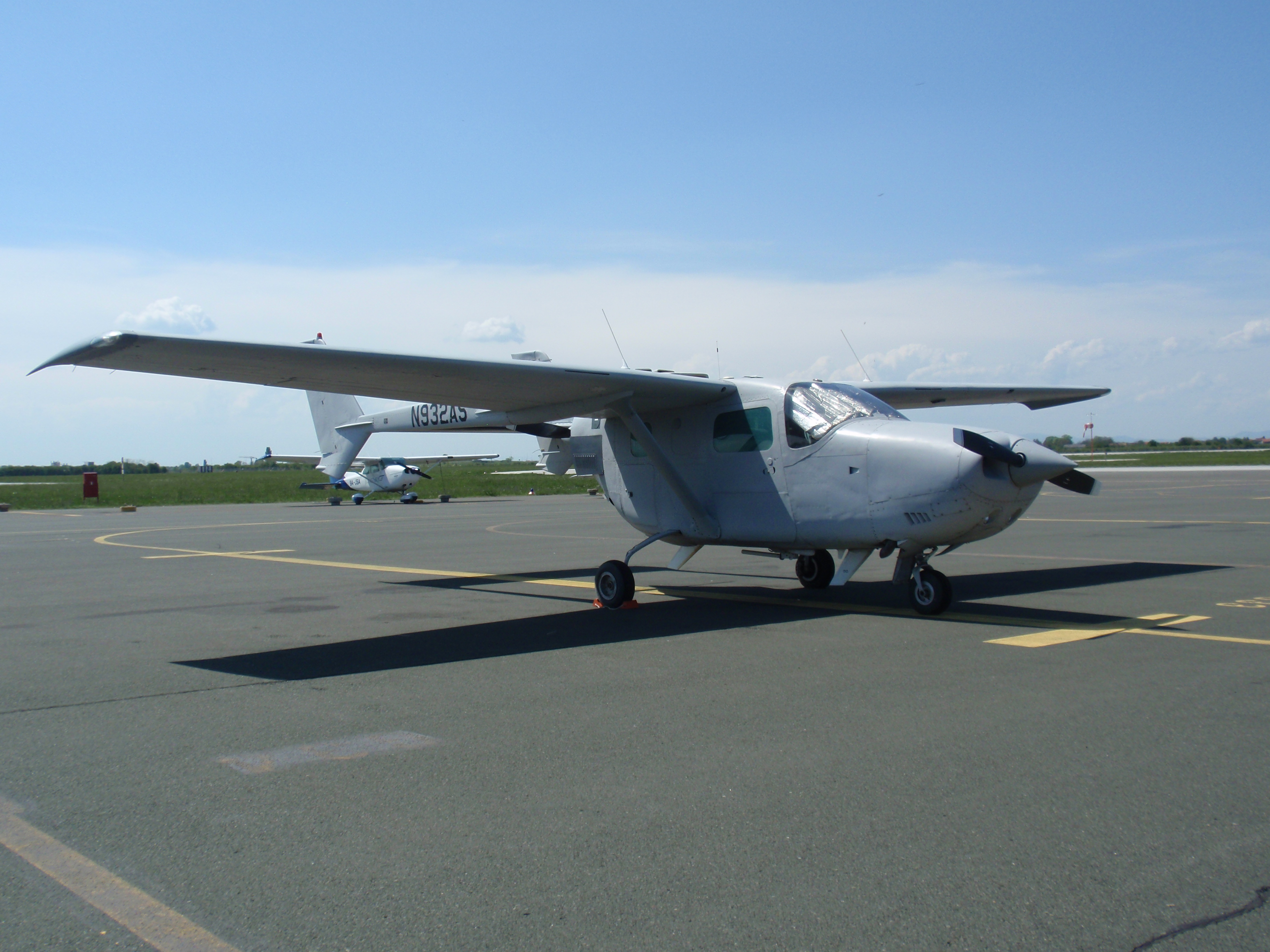
- A Cessna 337, similar to the aircraft involved

Incident
- Date: 24 February 1996
- Summary: Two aircraft shot down by the Cuban Air Force
- Site: Near the northern Cuban coastline
- Total fatalities: 4
- Total survivors: 4

First aircraft
- Type: Cessna 337C Super Skymaster
- Operator: Brothers to the Rescue
- Registration: N5485S
- Flight origin: Miami–Opa Locka Executive Airport
- Occupants: 2
- Crew: 2
- Fatalities: 2
- Survivors: 0

Second aircraft
- Type: Cessna 337C Super Skymaster
- Operator: Brothers to the Rescue
- Registration: N2456S
- Flight origin: Miami–Opa Locka Executive Airport
- Occupants: 2
- Crew: 2
- Fatalities: 2
- Survivors: 0

Third aircraft
- Type: Cessna 337C Super Skymaster
- Operator: Brothers to the Rescue
- Registration: N2506
- Flight origin: Miami–Opa Locka Executive Airport
- Occupants: 4
- Passengers: 2
- Crew: 2
- Fatalities: 0
- Injuries: 0
- Survivors: 4

On 24 February 1996, a Cuban Air Force Mikoyan MiG-29UB shot down two unarmed Cessna 337 Skymaster aircraft operated by Brothers to the Rescue, an organization opposed to the Cuban government. The Organization of American States (OAS) reported that no warning was given; Cuban government sources said "These people knew what they were doing. They were warned", and that the aircraft had entered Cuban airspace. All the occupants of the aircraft were killed: Carlos Costa, Armando Alejandre, Jr., Mario de la Peña, and Pablo Morales. A third Cessna involved escaped. Previous similar flights had released propaganda leaflets over Cuba.

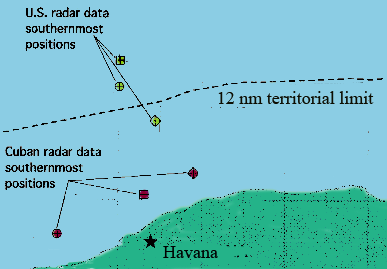
Map showing the southernmost positions (prior to the incident) of the three aircraft according to US and Cuban data.

Radar data and screen prints were provided by a United States Customs Service Supervisory Detection Systems Specialist who recorded the entire incident as it happened using data from a U.S. surveillance radar balloon in the Florida Keys.

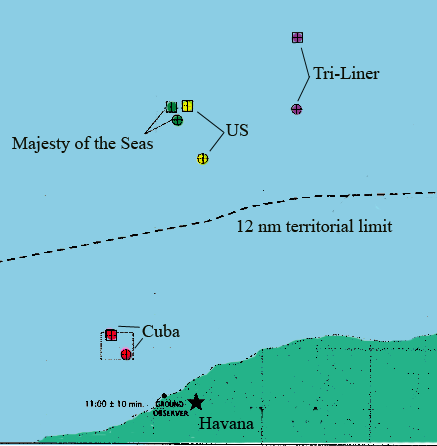
The map shows the locations where the two aircraft were reportedly shot down. Finding many inconsistencies in US and Cuban data, the ICAO investigation determined the most likely location to be that determined from information from the ship Majesty of the Seas.

== Description ==
On 24 February 1996, two of the Brothers to the Rescue Cessna 337 Skymasters (twin-engine civilian light aircraft) were shot down by a Cuban Air Force Mikoyan MiG-29UB, while a second jet fighter, a MiG-23, orbited nearby. All the occupants of the aircraft were killed: Carlos Costa, Armando Alejandre, Jr., Mario de la Peña and Pablo Morales. A third aircraft, flown by José Basulto, escaped. The first aircraft was shot down 9 nautical miles (17 km; 10 mi) outside Cuban territorial airspace, and the second was shot down 10 nautical miles (19 km; 12 mi) outside. The incident was subsequently investigated by the International Civil Aviation Organization (ICAO).

A military version of the Cessna 337, the Cessna O-2 Skymaster, had been retired in the late 1980s from military service, although two examples were kept mainly in storage by the US Army at the Yuma Testing Ground until 2010. Cuba claimed that the group used "planes previously employed in the wars in Vietnam and El Salvador given to them by the U.S. Air Force from which the 'USAF' signs have not been completely erased."

Cuban authorities had notified the United States of multiple violations of their airspace since May 1994, repeatedly demanding that the United States adopt measures to end them. In at least one case (13 July 1995), the pilot had released leaflets over Havana. The United States authorities had issued public statements advising of the potential consequences of unauthorized entry into Cuban airspace and had initiated legal actions against Basulto, but had retained his certification to fly during appeal. After Basulto was warned by an FAA official about the possibility of being shot down, he replied, "You must understand I have a mission in life to perform", disregarding the potential danger involved. He later said he considered the group's activities to be acts of civil disobedience against the regime, and a demonstration that such disobedience was possible.

According to Cuban authorities, two light aircraft entered Cuban territorial airspace on 9 and 13 January 1996, and released leaflets which fell on Cuban territory. According to the pilot of one of the aircraft, half a million leaflets were released on 13 January; he also claims they were released outside the 12 miles (19 km) Cuban territorial limit and the wind carried them to Havana. This version of events was detailed by Juan Pablo Roque, who returned to Cuba the day before the shootdown and who was later indicted on charges of spying for Cuba against the United States as having helped organize the shootdown. According to Roque, Basulto had dropped the leaflets from 10 miles (16 km) north of Havana, not the stated 12 miles (19 km), from a high altitude on a day when the winds would carry them south toward Cuba. Specifically, in a Cuban television interview days after the shootdown took place, Roque, from within Cuba, stated, "I personally have violated air space, specifically the last was on 9 January 1996, where I got a call the day before to participate in a flight to Havana where thousands of leaflets were going to be released from a height of more than 9,500 feet (2,900 m) at a distance of less than 10 miles (16 km) from the coast."

Following that incident, the ICAO report states, the Commander of the Anti-Aircraft Defence and the Air Force of Cuba claimed "he was instructed that violations of Cuban territorial airspace should no longer be tolerated, and that he was authorized, if such a situation arose again, to decide personally on military interception and shooting-down, if so required."

On 24 February 1996, the group's aircraft flew another mission. While the Brothers to the Rescue aircraft were still north of the 24th parallel, the Cuban Air Force ordered the scrambling of two military aircraft, a MiG-29 and a MiG-23, operating under ground control.

The pilots identified the target as a Cessna 337 and requested authorization from military control, who responded with "authorized to destroy." Two of the group's three aircraft flying that day were shot down. According to the OAS report, there was no warning of any kind issued to the planes, nor the opportunity given to land. With the shooting down of each aircraft, the Cuban pilots could be heard celebrating over the radio. Terms like "cojones" were repeatedly used by the Cuban fighter pilots. Their radio transmissions included statements such as "We blew his balls off!" In a reference to the Cuban pilot's understanding that the aircraft they were attacking were the same ones that had been repeatedly flying directly over the island of Cuba, they also transmitted the following, "He won't give us any more fucking trouble." Finally, the Cuban pilots also said, "The other one is destroyed; the other one is destroyed. Homeland or death (patria o muerte), you bastards! The other one is also down." Military control stated "Congratulations to the pair of you."

In an audio recording dated to June 1996 (four months after the shootdown), then-Cuban Minister of Defense Raúl Castro is heard stating he instructed Cuban Air Force pilots to "shoot them down over the sea when they appear," referring to the Brothers to the Rescue pilots.

Subsequently, the Inter-American Commission on Human Rights issued a report that concluded, "The fact that weapons of war and combat-trained pilots were used against unarmed civilians shows not only how disproportionate the use of force was, but also the intent to end the lives of those individuals. It is claimed the extracts from the radio communications between the MiG-29 pilots and the military control tower indicate that they acted from a superior position and showed malice and scorn toward the human dignity of the victims."

The third Brothers to the Rescue aircraft, with Basulto on board, was also identified for intercept and was to be shot down, but escaped.

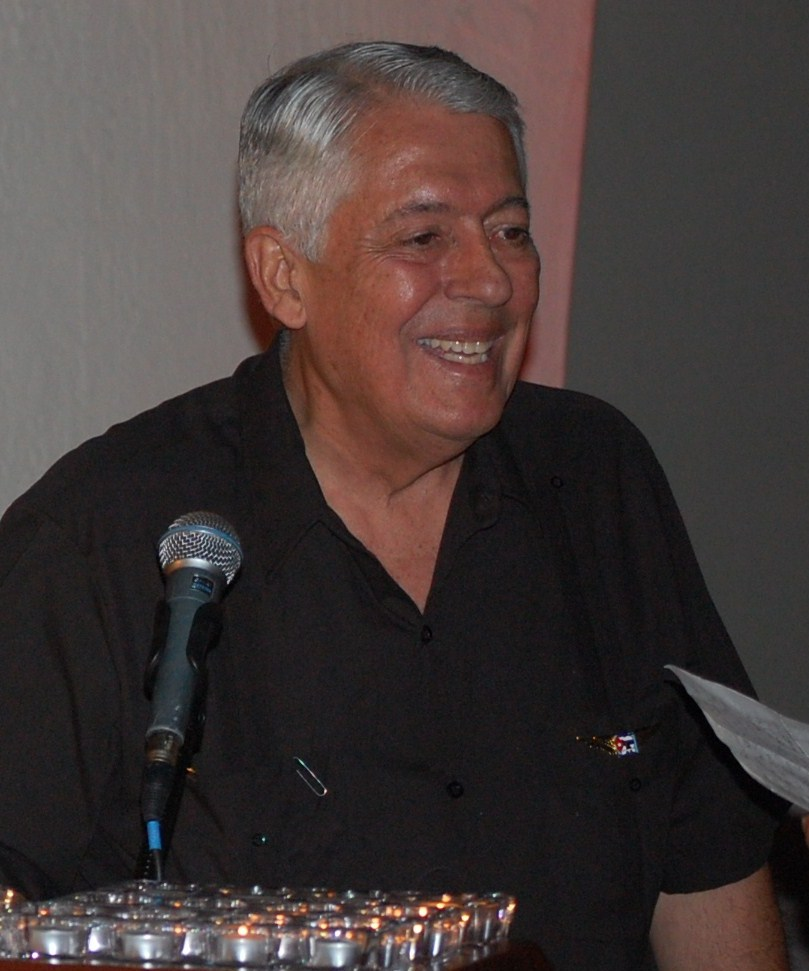
José Basulto, aviator and leader of "Brothers to the Rescue" in Miami in 2010

Testimony from retired USAF Colonel George E. Buchner expressed support for Cuba's claim that both Brothers' aircraft and a third flown by Basulto were only 4 miles (6.4 km) to 5 miles (8.0 km) off the Cuban coast. The statement by Buchner was directly contradictory to eyewitness testimony and verified radar data documentation provided by Department of the Treasury, Supervisory Detection Systems Specialist J. Houlihan during sworn testimony before an FAA Administrative Hearing in 1996, and the House Committee on International Relations, Subcommittee on the Western Hemisphere, 18 September 1996.

The ICAO report found that the aircraft shot down were both very near (and, in one case, directly above) a U.S fishing vessel named Tri-Liner which had a recorded position at the time of the incident 9 nautical miles (17 km; 10 mi) outside Cuban territorial airspace. Also nearby was the cruise ship Majesty of the Seas. The ICAO report also states that means other than interception, such as radio communication, had been available to Cuba, but had not been utilized, and that this conflicts with the ICAO principle that interception of civil aircraft should be undertaken only as a last resort. It is also claimed the Cuban Air Force did not make any attempt to direct the aircraft beyond the boundaries of national airspace, guide them away from a prohibited, restricted, or danger area, or instruct them to effect a landing.

== Reactions ==
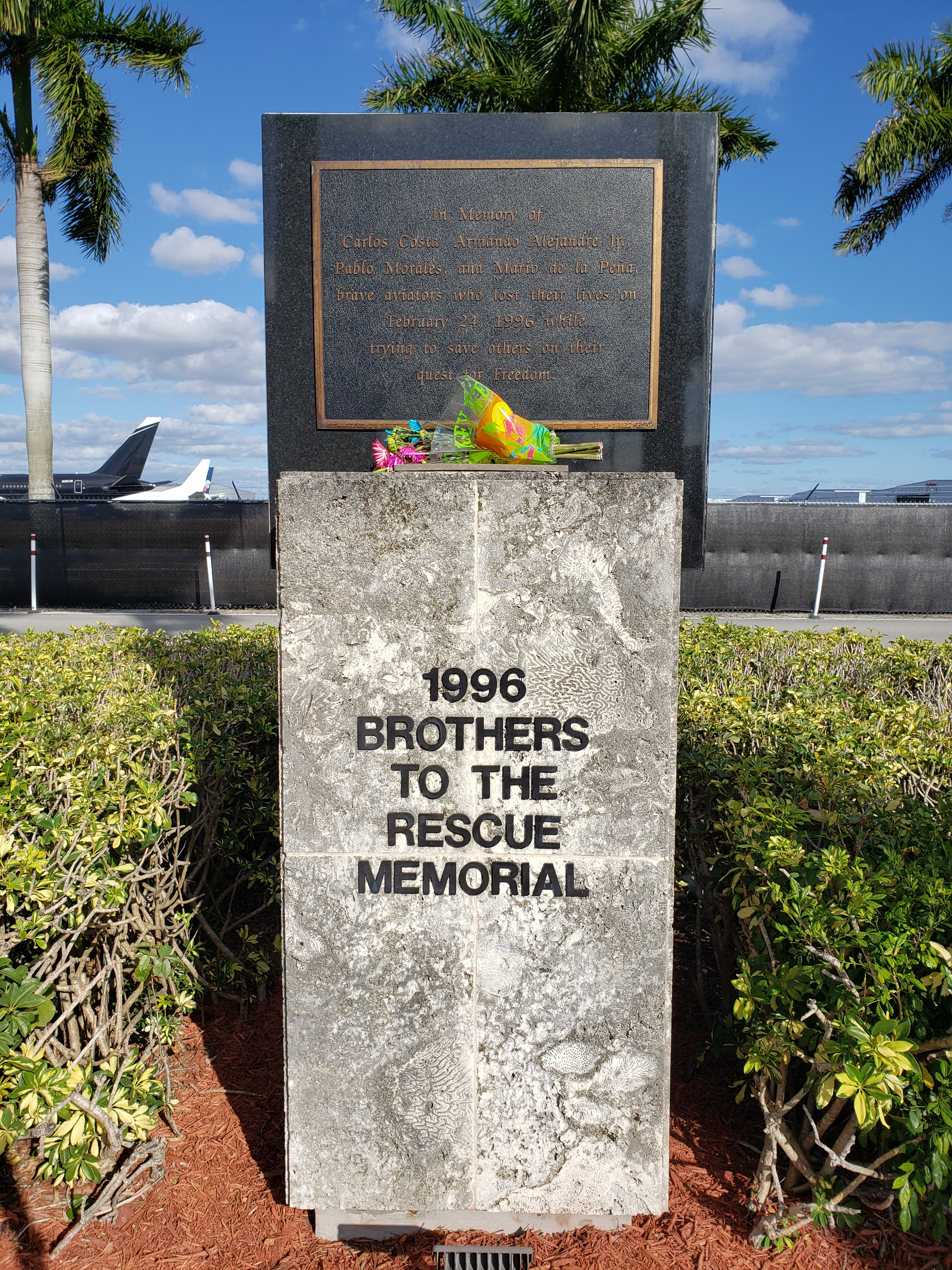
Memorial at Miami-Opa Locka Airport

=== International ===
Cuban-American human rights advocate Jesús Permuy, representing the International Association of Educators for World Peace, condemned the shooting and denounced the Cuban government in the United Nations Commission on Human Rights to bring greater international attention to the issue as a violation of human rights.

In response to growing international controversy, the United Nations Security Council passed Security Council Resolution 1067 (1996), a U.S.-sponsored resolution condemning Cuba. Dissenting members believed that the resolution was singling out Cuba for condemnation, and instead should have issued a call which urged both states to refrain from shooting down civilian airplanes as well as to prevent the improper use of civil aviation.

=== United States ===
In Miami, reaction from the exile community was swift. Jorge Mas Canosa, co-founder and leader of the Cuban American National Foundation, condemned the attack: "For two warplanes from the Castro government to shoot down two unarmed civilian aircraft with American flags on a humanitarian mission should be considered an act of war against the US". President Bill Clinton issued Proclamation 6867 on 1 March 1996, declaring a national emergency by reason of a disturbance or threatened disturbance of international relations.

The pilots responsible were the twin brothers, Teniente Coronel (LTC) Lorenzo Alberto Perez Perez and his "Guy in Back," Teniente Coronel (LTC) Francisco Perez Perez. Both were charged in the United States for their role in the attack. Along with their commanding officer, they were indicted in August 2003.

==== Indictment of Raúl Castro ====
On 20 May 2026, the United States Department of Justice announced in Miami, Florida, that former First Secretary of the Communist Party of Cuba Raúl Castro, who was Cuba's defense minister during the shootdown, had been indicted on charges of murder, destruction of aircraft, and conspiracy to kill U.S. nationals, along with 5 others involved in the shootdown.

=== Cuban response ===
Miguel Alfonso Martinez of the Cuban Foreign Ministry said that the two aircraft that were shot down were "not common civilian aircraft" as suggested by the US. "This is not the case of an innocent civilian airliner that, because of an instrument error, departs from an air corridor and gets into the airspace of another country". "These people knew what they were doing. They were warned. They wanted to take certain actions that were clearly intended to destabilize the Cuban government and the US authorities knew about their intentions".

Groups sympathetic to Cuba, while not approving the shootdown, noted "the policies of the United States government of indefensible hostility against the island of Cuba that sit at the heart of the matter", citing constant threats and a history of military and paramilitary attacks on Cuba from the US and paramilitary groups.

== In popular culture ==
=== Film ===
- Documentary film Shoot Down, that illustrates the incident from the Brothers to the Rescue perspective, was released in 2006 and re-released in an updated, edited version on January 25, 2008. It was directed by Cristina Khuly, niece of downed pilot Armando Alejandre, Jr.
- Wasp Network, 2019. Starring Penélope Cruz, Édgar Ramírez, Gael García Bernal, and Wagner Moura.

=== Literature ===
- The Last Soldiers of the Cold War, Fernando Morais, 2011.
- Betrayal: Cuba, Castro & The Cuban Five, Thomas Van Hare and Matt Lawrence, 2010.
