= Wasp Network (film) =

2019 film by Olivier Assayas

- Official release poster
- Directed by: Olivier Assayas
- Screenplay by: Olivier Assayas
- Based on: The Last Soldiers of the Cold War; 2015 novel by Fernando Morais
- Produced by: Charles Gillibert; Rodrigo Teixeira
- Starring: Penélope Cruz; Édgar Ramírez; Gael García Bernal; Ana de Armas; Wagner Moura
- Cinematography: Yorick Le Saux; Denis Lenoir
- Edited by: Simon Jacquet
- Music by: Eduardo Cruz
- Production companies: Orange Studio; RT Features; CG Cinéma; France TV Cinema; Nostromo Pictures; Scope Pictures; Memento Films; France 2 Cinéma
- Distributed by: Memento Films Distribution (France); Wanda Films (Spain); Netflix (Select territories)
- Release dates: 1 September 2019 (Venice); 31 January 2020 (France); 19 June 2020 (worldwide)
- Running time: 123 minutes
- Countries: France; Brazil; Spain; Belgium
- Languages: English; Spanish; Russian
- Budget: €10.53 million
- Box office: $1.4 million

Wasp Network is a 2019 spy thriller film written and directed by Olivier Assayas, based on the book The Last Soldiers of the Cold War by Fernando Morais. It stars Penélope Cruz, Édgar Ramírez, Gael García Bernal, Ana de Armas, and Wagner Moura. It tells the true story of Cuban spies in American territory during the 1990s.

The film had its world premiere at the Venice Film Festival on 1 September 2019. It was released in France on 31 January 2020 by Memento Films, and was released on 19 June 2020 by Netflix.

== Plot ==
In Havana in the early 1990s, pilot René González leaves his wife Olga and daughter Irma in Cuba to start a new life in the United States. He secretly flies to Miami on a stolen plane (Antonov An-2). González soon joins a group of Cuban exiles and Castro opponents, Brothers to the Rescue, who operate from Florida and act against the Cuban government through military operations and also aim to disintegrate the Cuban tourism industry. They even fly over Cuban airspace to deliver flyers. A Cuban secret organization named la Red Avispa, or the "Wasp Network," is directed by Gerardo Hernández, also known as Manuel Viramontez.

The Cuban American National Foundation (CANF) and Brothers to the Rescue not only launch propaganda brochures about Havana, and lead balseros from Cuba to the Florida shores, but also smuggle drugs and weapons. They also conduct terrorist activities in Cuba organised by Luis Posada Carriles. In 1996, two Cessna Skymasters from Brothers to the Rescue are shot down by Cuban MiGs over the Caribbean Sea, killing four aviators.

Juan Pablo Roque is another Cuban pilot who defects by swimming to Guantanamo Bay Naval Base and asking for political asylum. He arrives in Miami, and works as an FBI informant in addition to piloting for the Brothers. He buys expensive clothes, a Rolex, and settles down and marries Ana Margarita Martínez. After a few years, he flies back to Havana, revealing that he was a mole who had infiltrated anti-Castro associations.

After months and many bureaucratic procedures, Olga and her daughter are allowed to leave Cuba and rejoin René in Miami. But before their travel, Viramontez informs Olga that her husband is not a gusano (Spanish for worm) or a traitor to the Castro regime but indeed is a hero and a Cuban intelligence agent who infiltrated the CANF, which she must keep secret for the security of all of them and the Wasp Network.

In El Salvador in 1997, Raúl Cruz León is recruited by anti-Castroists to place C-4 bombs in Havana hotels. An Italian tourist dies and the same day he is caught by the Cuban police. After being caught the organization abandons him to his fate.

Finally, René González, Manuel Viramontez and the entire Wasp Network are captured by the FBI, all face charges of conspiracy to commit espionage, conspiracy to commit murder, acting as an agent of a foreign government, and other illegal activities in the United States and face long prison terms if found guilty in the Federal Court of judge Joan A. Lenard. In an interview Fidel Castro defends the actions of the agents and their program.

Despite the fact that the FBI offers to reduce his sentence in exchange for information, René refuses to cooperate.

Aftermath:

- Olga Salanueva-González was deported to Cuba after 3 months in prison. She was later reunited with her daughters Irma and Ivette and campaigned for the liberation of her husband.
- René González served 12 years in prison. He was released on 7 October 2011.
- Gerardo Hernández aka Manuel Viramontez received 2 life sentences. He was released as a part of a spy swap after only serving 15 years.
- Ana Margarita Martínez sued the Cuban government. She was awarded $27 million in punitive damages. To this day, she has collected only $200,000.
- Juan Pablo Roque was never a pilot again. Facing money problems, he sold his Rolex on eBay.
- Raúl Cruz León is still serving a 30-year sentence.
- Luis Posada Carriles died in 2018, aged 90. He was never prosecuted for the 1997 Cuba hotel bombings.

== Cast ==
- Penélope Cruz as Olga Salanueva-González
- Édgar Ramírez as René González
- Wagner Moura as Juan Pablo Roque
- Gael García Bernal as Gerardo Hernández / Manuel Viramontez
- Ana de Armas as Ana Margarita Martínez
- Leonardo Sbaraglia as José Basulto
- Nolan Guerra Fernández as Raúl Cruz León
- Osdeymi Pastrana Miranda as Irma González
- Tony Plana as Luis Posada Carriles
- Julian Flynn as PUND's pilot
- Anel Perdomo as Adriana, Hernández's/Viramontez's wife
- Julio Gabay as Juan Pablo Roque's cousin
- Amanda Morado as Teté
- Carolina Peraza Matamoros as Irma (6 years old)
- Omar Ali as Jorge Mas Canosa
- Adria Arjona as Judge Joan A. Lenard

== Production ==
In April 2017, it was announced that Olivier Assayas would write and direct Wasp Network. Based on Fernando Morais' book called The Last Soldiers of the Cold War, it would tell the story of Cuban spies in American territory during the 1990s. In May 2018, it was announced that Pedro Pascal and Édgar Ramírez would star in the film. In September, Penélope Cruz, Wagner Moura and Gael García Bernal were added to the cast. Adria Arjona was added to the cast in December. In February 2019, Ana de Armas was cast.

Filming began in Cuba on 18 February 2019, and wrapped on 4 May 2019.

== Release ==
The film premiered at the Venice Film Festival on 1 September 2019. It also screened at the Toronto International Film Festival, the Deauville American Film Festival, the San Sebastián International Film Festival, the New York Film Festival, the BFI London Film Festival. and the Mumbai Film Festival.

Netflix acquired distribution rights to the film for the world excluding France, Eastern Europe, the Baltics, Russia, Greece, Portugal, Italy, the Middle East, Israel, China and worldwide airlines in January 2020, releasing it on 19 June 2020.

== Reception ==
=== Critical response ===
On review aggregator website Rotten Tomatoes, the film holds an approval rating of 39% based on 77 reviews, with an average of 5.3/10. The website's critical consensus states: "Wasp Network's talented cast makes this spy drama hard to ignore, even if the mystery at the heart of its storyline is too tangled for its own good." On Metacritic, the film has a weighted average score of 54 out of 100, based on 21 critics, indicating "mixed or average reviews".

Nicholas Barber of BBC gave the film 4 out of 5 stars, calling it "an entertaining and often glamorous cloak-and-dagger thriller in which the sun is always shining and the actors are all gorgeous." Jay Weissberg of Variety wrote, "it leaves viewers gratified by the filmmaking bravura and the sheer pleasure of watching this superb cast in top form, but also feeling shortchanged." Xan Brooks of The Guardian gave the film 3 out of 5 stars, writing, "What it lacks is an emotional charge and a fine-grained texture." David Rooney of The Hollywood Reporter called the film "a big, handsomely shot movie with a strong cast and stunning location work" and "a knotty tangle of endless back and forth between too many characters, situations and settings to make for satisfying storytelling."

== See also ==
- Cuban Five, about the real-life agents on which the film is based
- 1996 shootdown of Brothers to the Rescue aircraft
- 1997 Cuba hotel bombings
- Alan Gross
