= Shootdown =

Shootdown may refer to:

- List of aircraft shootdowns
- List of airliner shootdown incidents
- Shootdown (film), 1988 film
- Shoot Down, 2006 documentary
- "Shoot Down", a 2004 song by the Prodigy from Always Outnumbered, Never Outgunned
