= Shoot Down =

- Directed by: Cristina Khuly
- Written by: Cristina Khuly
- Produced by: Gloria Bremer, Larry Confino, Douglas Eger
- Edited by: Malcolm Jamieson
- Distributed by: Rogues Harbor Studios
- Release dates: March 3, 2007 (Cinequest Film Festival); January 18, 2008 (U.S.)
- Running time: 85 minutes
- Country: United States
- Language: English
- Budget: US$500,000 (est.)

Shoot Down is a 2006 documentary film written and directed by Cristina Khuly.

== Synopsis ==
The film shows the events surrounding the Brothers to the Rescue organization and the eventual shootdown of two of its aircraft by the Cuban Air Force.

== Production ==
Khuly explores the events before and after the Feb. 24, 1996 downing of the two Brothers to the Rescue planes. Khuly, the niece of one of the victims, interviews surviving family members as well as José Basulto, the only survivor of the attack.

== Reception ==
Based on five reviews collected by Rotten Tomatoes, 80% of the critics enjoyed Shoot Down with an average rating of 7/10.

Dennis Harvey of Variety said about the film: "Shoot Down" does an admirably evenhanded job examining circumstances that led to two U.S. civilian planes being shot down by Cuban military aircraft 11 years ago. Cristina Khuly's documentary merits fest, educational, DVD and broadcast exposure, particularly while its hot-button issues have again been warmed to boiling point by Castro's failing health.
