= Baruj Salinas =

Cuban-American artist (1935–2024)

- Born: July 6, 1935; Havana, Cuba
- Died: August 18, 2024 (aged 89); Coral Gables, Florida, U.S.
- Education: Kent State University
- Occupations: Artist, architect
- Known for: Abstract visual art
- Notable work: Language of the Clouds series, Penca de Palma Triste series, the Torah Project
- Movement: Abstract Expressionism (art), Modernism (architecture)
- Website: barujsalinasart.com

Baruj Salinas (July 6, 1935 – August 18, 2024) was a Cuban-American contemporary visual artist and architect. He is recognized as a central figure in the establishment of the modern Latin American art market in South Florida.

== Background ==
Salinas' family is of Sephardic Jewish origins. His ancestors came from a small salt mining town in northern Spain and they derive their name from these origins with "sal" meaning salt in Spanish. They resettled to Silibria, Turkey, another small town, following the 1492 expulsion of the Jews in Spain. They remained in Turkey until the Greco-Turkish Wars of the early 20th century, after which they emigrated first to Marseille, France in 1918 and then to Cuba in 1920, within the area of Old Havana, which had a substantial Jewish community.

== Early life ==
=== Upbringing in Cuba ===
Salinas was born in Havana, Cuba on July 6, 1935. He began painting early in life and was influenced and supported in the arts by his mother. Regina was a painter whose work consisted of still life scenes of flowers as her main subject in oil paint. This was Salinas’ first exposure to art and by the age of six he began to assist with his mother's painting. Salinas would also draw and sketch, such as tracing newspaper comics. His early sketches included Tarzan, Dick Tracy, and Superman.

By age eleven, Salinas had begun painting landscapes based on his observations of scenery in Cuba. This was followed by scenes of life and people in Havana such as fish salesmen, ice cream salesmen, and children on buses. These evolved into busier market scenes that he would sketch in person and apply paint to afterwards. His early works were made in his childhood bedroom as he did not have a studio at the time and he first exhibited his works at his school. At fourteen, he attended the Círculo de Bellas Artes behind the National Capitol Building in Havana and was the only teenager in attendance, surrounded by older professional painters.

=== Kent State and architecture ===
His mother encouraged his progression as a self-taught artist and he continued developing in this way (“unrestrained”) until he received a scholarship to study painting in Kent State University. Upon attending, he felt socio-economically excluded from the fine art world due to his background, though he remained strongly dedicated to design. Therefore, he followed in his father's footsteps and switched his major to architecture, continuing to paint as a personal hobby and minor income source.

While in America, he had begun painting portraits to supplement his income. His subjects were largely his friends and their family and they continued in his early realist vein. Salinas later admitted that in these commissions he would idealize his subject's likeness for a more flattering representation and overall did not enjoy painting portraits. In his personal painting, however, his style had begun to evolve away from realism and representational imagery as his architecture studies impacted him creatively. During this period he became exposed to the Abstract Expressionist movement, which would influence his later art. He began to explore facades and structures and gradually dabble into abstraction, which would become his most identifiable style later in his career. He began by depicting buildings around him in America and eventually delved into depicting imagined buildings, which would take him further into three dimensional representation and the conceptual.

After he received his degree in architecture from Kent State in 1958, Salinas pursued architecture professionally in different cities, identifying as a Modernist, while also continuing to paint and exhibit his work. For the remainder of the decade he would work as an architect while residing in Mexico City (1957–59) and San Antonio, Texas (1959–61). In 1959 he participated in an exhibition at the Museo Nacional de Bellas Artes, Havana. In 1960 he exhibited at the Circulo de Bellas Artes in Havana as well as the Witte Museum in San Antonio and was well received. During this period of the early 1960s Salinas began winning awards for his art and also began feeling restrained by the rigidity and form of architecture. This combination led him to stray from architecture and embrace the arts more directly, a process that would continue into the 1960s.

== Art career ==
=== First Miami period ===
Having emigrated from Cuba in 1959, Salinas joined the Cuban diaspora in exile as a result of Fidel Castro's rise to power in the Cuban Revolution, joining them in Miami after his stays in Mexico City and San Antonio. Once in Miami, he first mainly worked professionally as an architect to sustain himself but also continued to paint. Salinas had the advantage of being already fluent in English by that point, but still struggled economically as most early exiles had, particularly in the arts. By 1963-64 he was selling his works for as little as $25 (about $200 in 2020, adjusted for inflation), during the period well before the establishment of an organized market for Cuban art in South Florida. As a result, even those relatively low rates were often paid in installments, such as five dollars a week or month. Some buyers were previous collectors of Cuban art in Cuba looking to restart their collection after losing their paintings to the Castro regime. Others were new collectors.

Throughout the 1960s Salinas was increasingly active in exhibiting his painting in art venues throughout the United States (Florida, Texas, Missouri) as well as internationally in Mexico and Guatemala. His artwork continued his self-imposed evolution away from architectural influences and saw him directly embrace abstraction for the first time. He drew inspiration from Apollo 13 and the Space Race, and painted pieces inspired by outer space and astronomy, such as nebulas and constellations.

Salinas was also increasingly active in the Cuban and Latin American art market in Miami. A significant development came in the mid-1960s when Salinas co-founded (with Enrique Riveron) and subsequently led the Grupo GALA (an acronym for Grupo de Artistas Latino Americanos), the first known professional organization of Latin American artists established in Florida. GALA members (Salinas, Enrique Riveron, Rafael Soriano, José María Mijares, Roxanna McAllister, and Osvaldo Gutiérrez) would gather bi-monthly to discuss their individual art projects, sponsorships, and organize bi-annual group exhibitions.

Through most of the 1960s, while he continued to deepen his commitment to art, Salinas still worked in architecture as his main profession. This would change by the turn of the decade as he received increasing recognition for his art. In 1968, Salinas won a First Prize award for Watercolor from the Fort Lauderdale Museum of Art. In 1969 he received the Cintas Fellowship for art and then for a second time in 1970, which Salinas has credited in interviews with giving him the initiative to ultimately quit architecture as his main profession and fully dedicate himself to fine art in the 1970s. In 1971, Salinas had a solo exhibition in Washington D.C. at the B.I.D. Gallery.

During this period Salinas was neighbors with fellow prominent Cuban artist Juan Gonzalez and taught him the airbrush painting technique González used to achieve the large-scale hyperrealism style that would soon gain him recognition by leading art institutions in following decade. Salinas also introduced González to Jesus and Marta Permuy, in 1969. This facilitated the launch of Permuy Gallery in 1972 as Gonzalez relocated permanently to New York City and the Permuys assumed the lease to González's Coral Gables art studio and converted it into one of the first Cuban art galleries in the United States. Salinas and the individual Grupo GALA members would be active participants in the gallery's activities as well as in other early Latin American art events and activities, which contributed to the gradual growth of that market in the region during the late 1960s and 1970s.

=== Spanish period ===
In 1974, Salinas relocated from Miami to Barcelona, Spain where he would remain for the following two decades. The move signaled the end of the GALA group and a new phase of Salinas’ career. In Spain, Salinas became associated with leading art dealer Juana Mordó, who was an essential contact for Salinas and opened her vast network to him within Madrid and Barcelona. This critical exposure helped him become established in Spain and develop a regular stream of collectors there. Salinas also became associated with prominent Spanish painters, including Joan Miró, Antoní Tàpies, as well as American Alexander Calder. He also became immersed in Spain's literary community and developed close friendships with several writers including María Zambrano, José Angel Valente, Vahe Godel, Ramon Dachs, Pere Gimferrer, and Michel Butor.

This period saw Salinas venture further into total abstraction and free form styles. It also saw his color palette shift toward more subtle and neutral tones with a strong emphasis on whites and grays, often inspired by and symbolizing clouds. Salinas would call this concept “The Language of the Clouds,” which became a series of works exploring this color palette and approach to abstraction. During his Spain period, Salinas would also explore the pictographs of China and Japan as well as foreign alphabets including Greek, Iberian, and Hebrew. These alphabets reflected the influence of the writers he was exposed to and his interest in reducing patterns to fundamentals and abstracting them with his palette of white, which he associated with purity and cleanliness, particularly in the context of its prevalence in Barcelona.

==== Collaborations ====
Collaborations were a significant mark of this phase of Salinas’ career, particularly interdisciplinary collaborations, and several won awards.

In the 1980s, Salinas actively worked with several writers, particularly poets. In 1980 Salinas partnered with José Ángel Valente on Tres lecciones de Tinieblas (Three Lessons of Darkness), a book inspired by the Jewish mysticism of the Kabbalah and utilized fourteen Hebrew letters along with Valente's poetic interpretation of each. The first letter (Aleph) was called "first blood", while "Beth" corresponded with the concept of home or dwelling. The book won Spain's National Prize of Poetry for its year.

He also did two books with María Zambrano, one of which, Antes de la ocultación: los mares (1983), was noteworthy for its four lithographs by Salinas that involved a complex double process: the first being the lithographic process while the second was the incorporation of texture into the book. The pair had a long-running collaboration that would grow to include a second book, Arbol (Tree), in 1985 as well as a number of other projects through editor and gallerist Orlando Blanco. In 1988 Salinas worked with Michel Butor on the book Trois enfants dans la fournaise. The book featured etchings by Salinas and accompanying poetry by Butor and was shown in the Museum of Bayeux in France.

Salinas also established long-running creative relationships with Barcelona printmakers and artists. One was Rufino Tamayo, who specialized in lithographs and engravings. He also worked with Japanese artist and printmaker Masafumi Yamamoto for 15 years, during which time Salinas refined his own printmaking processes. The collaboration would also impact the development of his paintings as he would factor in more closely the etching and printmaking process that would follow in replicating his artworks. A poet associate of Salinas at the time described this influence as his being “yamamotisized,” and Salinas would in turn influence Yamamoto's work while in Barcelona.

=== Second Miami period and later career ===
Salinas returned to Miami in 1992 and would reside in Coral Gables, Florida. Since returning to the United States, he has exhibited in New York City, Chicago, Spain, France, Switzerland, Japan, Egypt, Panama, Venezuela, and elsewhere.

His style since his second Miami period has seen Salinas gradually re-embrace color. He attributed the widening of his color palette and increased use of contrast and saturation to the difference in light between Spain and Miami, as well as the cultural differences between how each city uses color. Upon his return to the United States in 1992, Salinas also met his second wife Marilyn C. Fonts, who was then employed in a South Florida fine art gallery; the couple would wed in 2004.

From 1993 to 1998, and again in 2000 and 2002–03, Salinas served as the Arts Coordinator for the International Committee for Human Rights in Miami. He was a fine art professor at Miami Dade College and began teaching in the MDC Interamerican campus in 2001. In that role, he had been active in curating and facilitating student exhibitions of art there.

From 2015 to 2017 Salinas was recruited to be part of The Torah Project which was then compiled in the book The Torah Project Humash. The book featured 27 images of his work. The book was presented in 2017 to Pope Francis at a ceremony in the Vatican with Salinas in attendance. The event was also significant for marking the first time that a Pope had blessed a Jewish document in the history of the Catholic Church.

In 2022, Salinas was the subject of a 50-year career retrospective titled Baruj Salinas: 1972-2022. The exhibition was held in the American Museum of the Cuban Diaspora and co-sponsored by the Miami-Dade College Museum of Art and Design (MOAD), the Freedom Tower, Miami-Dade County, and the Florida Department of State Division of Arts & Culture.

== Death ==
Salinas died in Coral Gables, Florida, on August 18, 2024, at the age of 89.

== Style ==
Salinas’ artwork and architecture design have their foundation in mid-century movements which he has interpreted and updated with a number of personal influences and themes. As an architect, Salinas is part of the Modernist tradition and before his retirement had prominently utilized concrete-heavy designs that drew influence from Frank Lloyd Wright's Fallingwater, Le Corbusier, and Erich Mendelsohn. Architecture had also influenced his early art.

Salinas’ art is noted for its spiritual, philosophical, cultural, and symbolic layerings. He is identified with the Abstract Expressionism movement, having first been exposed to the work of its leading members (Willem de Kooning, Jackson Pollock, Mark Rothko, Zao Wou-Ki) while at Kent State University. Salinas has occasionally taken to forays of figurative and representational abstraction. His various artistic periods are generally marked by gradual rather than radical style shifts, often incorporating many degrees of subtlety. His art is also noted for its collaborative nature and the occasional influence of other artists. Salinas described abstract painters Albert Rafols Casamada and Tàpies as influences on his work in Barcelona and also considered Miró a mentor while maintaining that they each had differing styles and approaches.

A core theme of Salinas' body of artwork has been the exploration of personal identity and the various cultural identities he embraces. One is his Cuban identity and he is considered part of the original wave of the La Vieja Guardia (the Old Guard) generation of Cuban artists that followed the Vanguardia movement in Cuba. His “Penca de Palma Triste” (Leaf of a Sad Palm) series of the late 1980s and early 1990s expressed his Cuban identity in exile as Salinas depicts a single leaf of a palm tree, a longtime quintessential symbol of Cuba, as symbolic of a piece removed from the whole, while also using his abstract method to create ambiguous images that can also be interpreted as waterfalls or the tail feathers of an exotic bird. Salinas also described color as a key acknowledgment of his Cuban identity.

Another identity he explores is his Jewish heritage. His expression of Jewish identity are seen in his themes and concepts of solitude, individuality, movement (diaspora), as well as his exploration of Jewish mysticism through the Kabbalah. In an essay on his work, Gerardo Muñoz has argued that Salinas' pictorial work is defined by the attempt to modernize classical debates around "Jewish Art" in relation to notions of artistic spectatorship and the crisis of form. Key Jewish-inspired series' of Salinas work include his award-winning collaboration with José Angel Valente, Tres Lecciones de Tinieblas, as well as his paintings for the Torah Project in 2015.

In regards to his interpretation of the cross-cultural themes of globalism in Contemporary art, Salinas has stated "Art has become a universal language and the modern artist attempts to embrace the idea of a language that has no barriers."

In describing Salinas' style, art critic Carlos M. Luis stated: "Baruj uses color and all its intense chromatism as a channel or filter (in the manner of alchemists) to distill a world of a romantic nature, but of a Romanticism closer to Turner than to Corot. That which Novalis called 'the adoration of chaos' was based in his belief that 'the more impenetrable was the chaos, so much more splendid was the star that would come out of it'." Luis believes Salinas' early experiments with color and abstraction were in the general vein of Kandinsky and that Salinas later developed a style akin to the "calculated spontaneity of Zen brushwork." In her 2004 book Cuban American Art in Miami: Exile, Identity, and the Neo-Baroque, SUNY art historian Lynette Bosch wrote that technique and emotion are both central to Salinas' body of work, as well as the development of "an integral aesthetic language of gesture, color, form, space, and movement."

Speaking on his own approach to art, Salinas has said “I strive to find a language that people can recognize in me by the work and not by my signature.“ He elaborated: “To me, painting is not work. It is something that transcends labor [...] like a meditation. I enjoy seeing a wide blank space being developed into something that has life.”

== Exhibitions and publications ==
Salinas has had over 100 solo exhibitions of his artwork and has exhibited in over 20 countries throughout Europe, Asia, Africa, and the Americas. These include multiple exhibitions in Cuba, the United States, Spain, France, Italy, Switzerland, Egypt, Israel, Japan, Mexico, Argentina, and elsewhere. Salinas has also exhibited his work jointly alongside the work of Salvador Dalí, Joan Miró, Wifredo Lam, René Portocarrero, Juan Gonzalez, Rafael Soriano, José Mijares and other prominent figures of 20th and 21st century visual art. His work has featured in several significant international fairs and exhibitions, including Art Basel and the Biennale of Graphic Arts.

Salinas has been covered by several media outlets, including Art Now, Arte Al Día Internacional Magazine, Art in America, Art News, The Washington Post, The Miami Herald and El Nuevo Herald. His artwork has also been discussed and featured on several books of Contemporary American art, Cuban, Latin American, and Jewish art.

He was the subject of the book BARUJ SALINAS, first published in Spanish in 1979 and republished in 1988, when it was translated into English and French.

In 2000, his career was the subject of the film Baruj Salinas, 21st Century Master.

In 2019 he participated in the second “Art + Architecture” exhibition in Coral Gables, Florida, where he was the main featured artist alongside his late fellow Grupo GALA member José Mijares.

In 2022, The American Museum of the Cuban Diaspora hosted a 50-year retrospective of Salinas' career from May to August. The exhibition, titled Baruj Salinas: 1972-2022, included works from several of Salinas' most high-profile series, including The Language of the Clouds and The Torah Project. The retrospective was produced by the Cuban Legacy Gallery, MDC Special Collections at Miami Dade College, and the American Museum of the Cuban Diaspora. Originally intended to be held at the Miami Freedom Tower, Salinas stated that the retrospective was "the best and most comprehensive exhibition of my career” noting that, in comparing the venues, the Museum allowed for considerably more work to be featured.

== Awards, recognition, and legacy ==
Throughout his career, Salinas has received numerous international fine art awards for his paintings. They include: Best Transparent Watercolor award from the Texas Watercolor Society (San Antonio, 1964), First Prize for Watercolor in the Hortt Memorial Exhibition at the Fort Lauderdale Museum of Art (1968), the Cintas Fellowship (twice; 1969, 1970), the Prize to Excellency at the VII Grand Prix International de Peinture in Cannes (1971), First Prize at the IV Pan American Exhibition in Miami, First Prize in the VI Latin American Print Biennial (Puerto Rico, 1983), and the National Prize of Engraving from the National Calcography of Madrid (1996).

Salinas' artwork has been sold on fine art brokerage institutions including Christie's, Artnet, and others.

Contemporary art collector Dr. Arturo F. Mosquera, stated to the Miami Herald that Salinas is “one of the most prolific and important painters of the third generation [La Vieja Guardia] of Cuban artists.” while Cuban art critic Carlos Luis considers Salinas to be "one of the finest Cuban exponents of Abstract Expressionism."

In 2021, Salinas was awarded the 2021 Premio Amelia Pelaez by the Cuban Cultural Center of New York. The award presentation event was co-sponsored by the New York City Department of Cultural Affairs.

One year following his death, Salinas was honored with an official Proclamation by the City of Coral Gables. The Proclamation was part of the city's Centennial in 2025 and declared Salinas one of the city's "greatest cultural treasures" in recognition of his enduring cultural impact, contributions to abstraction, and the international reach and influence of his work in the 20th and 21st centuries. It also proclaimed Salinas 90th birthday as "Baruj Salinas Day" in the city.

In late 2025, Salinas was added into the permanent collection of the Nova Southeastern University Alvin Sherman Library, one of the largest libraries in the state of Florida, as part of the Marta Permuy Legacy Collection. The piece, titled Popocatepetl, was unveiled in an exhibition at the Library's Cotilla Art Gallery alongside an original work by Salvador Dalí. The donation was notable for marking the first anniversary of his death, as well as the first institutional acquisition of Salinas work since his death.

In March 2026, Salinas entered into the permanent collection of the Tampa Museum of Art, marking his first museum acquisition since his death. The acquisition of Penca, of Salinas' Penca de Palma Triste series, was announced in a joint press release by the Tampa Museum of Art and the Baruj Salinas Legacy Estate. In the announcement, TMA Executive Director Michael Tomor explained the acquisition's importance stating "Baruj Salinas’ work represents an important chapter in the story of modern and contemporary art in the Americas," while TMA Curator of Modern and Contemporary art Joanna Robotham noted "Adding this work to the Tampa Museum of Art’s permanent collection strengthens our ability to share the story of the Cuban diaspora and the global impact of artists who have shaped the visual language of contemporary art."

The Smithsonian Institution maintains records and archives on Salinas' career as part of the Archives of American Art. The archives include records and correspondences with several of Salinas' artistic relationships, including Joan Miró, Alexander Calder, Rufino Tamayo, Antoni Tàpies, Ramón Alejandro, Roberto Estopiñán, Rafael Soriano, and Ricardo Pau-Llosa. Salinas is also included in the LUX Digital Archives of Yale University.

== Collections ==
Salinas' work is featured in several international fine art collections including:

- The Americas Collection Coral Gables, Florida
- The Art Institute of Chicago
- The Israel Museum, Jerusalem, Israel
- The Vatican Secret Archives, Vatican City
- The Joan Miro Foundation, Barcelona, Spain
- The Art Museum of the Americas, Washington, D.C.
- The Villa du Parc Center for Contemporary Art, Annemasse, France
- The National Museum of Catalonia - Museu Nacional d'Art de Catalunya, Barcelona, Spain
- Alicante Museum of Contemporary Art, Alicante, Spain
- Biblioteca Nacional, Madrid, Spain
- The National Institute of Fine Arts, Mexico City, Mexico
- The Museo de Arte Moderno, Mexico City
- Institute of International Education, New York
- Museo del Barrio, New York
- Villa de Montecatini Collection, Italy
- Cabinet des Estampes, Geneva, Switzerland
- The Irish Museum of Modern Art, Ireland
- The Beit Uri and Rami Nehoshtan Museum, Israel
- The McNay Art Museum, San Antonio, Texas
- The Phoenix Art Museum, Arizona
- The Tampa Museum of Art, Tampa, Florida
- Museo de Arte Contemporáneo Latinoamericano (MACLA), La Plata, Argentina
- The Museum of Fine Arts Budapest, Hungary
- The John and Mable Ringling Museum of Art, Sarasota, Florida
- The NSU Museum of Art Fort Lauderdale, Florida
- The Alvin Sherman Library, Fort Lauderdale, Florida
- The Bacardi Collection, Coral Gables, Florida
- The Permuy Collection, Coral Gables, Florida
- The Pinedo Collection, Miami, Florida
- The Lowe Art Museum, Coral Gables, Florida
