= Juan Gonzalez (artist) =

Cuban-American painter

Juan González
- Born: January 12, 1942; Camaguey, Cuba
- Died: December 24, 1993 (age 51); New York City
- Education: University of Miami, MFA
- Occupations: Artist, painter, professor at School of Visual Arts
- Years active: 1960s - 1993
- Known for: Hyperrealism, Magical Realism
- Awards: National Endowment of the Arts (1980, 1985, 1991); New York Foundation for the Arts (1984-1987); Cintas Fellowship (1974, 1976); Klenkenberg Award (1970, 1971)

Juan González (January 12, 1942 – December 24, 1993) was an important twentieth-century Cuban-American painter who rose to international fame in the 1970s and remained active until his death in the 1990s. Born in Cuba, González launched his art career in South Florida during the early 1970s and quickly gained recognition in New York City, where he subsequently relocated in 1972. While in New York González won several fine art awards, including the National Endowment of the Arts, New York Foundation for the Arts grant, and the Cintas Fellowship. González's art known is for its distinctive hyperrealism and magical realism elements delivered in a highly personal style with symbolic overtones. His work has been widely exhibited throughout the United States as well as internationally in Europe, Latin America, and Japan. He is included in the permanent collections of The Metropolitan Museum of Art, Art Institute of Chicago, The Carnegie Museum of Art, and Hirshhorn Museum and Sculpture Garden.

== Life and career ==
=== Early life ===
Juan González was born in Camaguey, Cuba, in 1942. He spent his early life in Cuba until fleeing to the United States in 1961 as a part of the Cuban exile resulting from the Cuban Revolution. González initially resided in Knoxville, Tennessee before relocating the following year to Miami where he joined other exiled Cuban artists and members of the Cuban diaspora. González then enrolled in the University of Miami where he initially studied architecture before transferring to fine art in 1966 where he won a Kennedy Scholarship.

=== 1970s: Rise to fame ===
In the late 1960s, while González attended University of Miami, he was taught the airbrush painting technique by fellow Cuban artist and then-neighbor Baruj Salinas, which González then used to achieve the large-scale Realism style that would soon gain him recognition by leading art institutions. His use of the airbrush as a drawing tool for detailing, rather than background and abstraction effects, was noted for being innovative and non-traditional. In 1969, Salinas introduced González to art figures Marta and Jesús Permuy. In 1970, González earned his bachelor's degree, began his graduate studies at the University of Miami, for which he received one of the few University Fellowships in art, and also won the Klinkenberg Award. By 1971, Marta Permuy had become an early supporter of his career and had helped secure him an art studio at 1901 Le Jeune Road in Coral Gables where he would produce pivotal early works that earned him his career breakthrough. That same year, González won the Lowe Museum's 1971 Ward Award and in November participated in the Miami Art Center's Thirty-Three Miami Painters exhibition, which precipitated González's discovery and move from Miami the following year. The exhibition was attended by Whitney Museum curator Robert Doty, who was impressed with González's work and arranged to meet him and visit his studio. Following this visit, González was added to the Whitney Museum's Whitney Annual collective exhibition for 1972, held from January 25-March 19, giving González national exposure. Concurrent to the Whitney Annual, González participated in the Lowe Art Museum's nationally publicized Phase of New Realism exhibition that February, cementing his association with the emerging hyperrealism movement.

Following his Whitney showing, González secured a solo exhibition at the Allan Stone Gallery of New York City, which was held in May 1972 and focused on González's largescale abstract works. The following month, González presented his thesis exhibition and attained his Master of Fine Arts degree from the University of Miami. Shortly afterward, González made arrangements to permanently relocate to New York City and have the Permuys assume the lease of his art studio. This led to it being converted into the Permuy Gallery that year, becoming one of the first Cuban art galleries in the United States. González became an active participant in the gallery and would attend openings and participate in group exhibitions to maintain a presence in the arts of South Florida.

After having established himself in New York, in 1974 González exhibited in The Art Institute of Chicago and also participated in a group exhibition in Nancy Hoffman Gallery which led to a successful solo exhibition there in 1975. Following that exhibition, Nancy Hoffman Gallery would subsequently go on to manage and represent González in New York for the rest of his career. Through the rest of the decade, González would twice win the Cintas Fellowship (1974, 1976) and also became a professor of fine art at the School of Visual Arts. By the end of the 1970s, González had again exhibited in The Art Institute of Chicago (1977) as well as Northeastern University (1977), Boston University (1977), University of Southern California (1979), and internationally in Caracas (1972) and London (1976). In 1979 González was appointed to serve as a panelist on the New York State Council on the Arts.

=== 1980s - 1990s ===
Throughout the rest of his career, González would continue to see his profile rise as he participated in several traveling solo and group exhibitions, win prestigious awards, and have his works added to the permanent collection of renown institutions such as the Metropolitan Museum of Art. In the early 1980s he further exhibited internationally in Colombia (1981) and Japan (1983) and was appointed to serve as a panelist on the New York State Council on the Arts. The 1980s and '90s would also see González win the National Endowment for the Arts three times (1980, 1985, 1991). He also maintained significant ties to the emerging South Florida art market and continued to exhibit there while residing in New York. In 1982 González would participate in a joint exhibition with Baruj Salinas. The show was noteworthy due to both artists being by that point firmly established Cuban art figures as well as sharing a common background in Miami as the springboard for their later success. Held in Miami-Dade College, the exhibition was noted by critics for the jarring contrasts in their styles as González work showcased his hyperrealist detailing while Salinas' work displayed his signature Abstract Expressionist-influenced style.

González also remained connected with his ex-wife, Josefina Camacho, her second husband Marcos Pinedo, and Marta Permuy who had each become major fine art collectors and dealers in the region. The Pinedos would often represent González in South Florida and through them he participated in the landmark 1983 "Miami Generation" exhibition which gave that group of Cuban artists their name and helped solidify the region's growing status in international fine art. González would become one of the Miami Generation's most recognizable figures. In the mid-1980s, González exhibited in the Smithsonian Institution (1985–87) and won three consecutive New York Foundation for the Arts grants (1984–87). Later in the decade he exhibited in the Pratt Institute (1988–89) and designed elaborate sets in New York for two productions of plays by famed Spanish poet and playwright Federico Garcia Lorca, "Blood Wedding" (1988) and "As Soon as Five Years Pass" (1991). Through the 1980s and 1990s González taught and lectured at the New York School of Visual Arts, a post he held for nearly twenty years. In the 1990s he exhibited in Ecuador (1991), again in Japan (1991–92), Italy (1993), as well as several universities and museums, including the Museum of Contemporary Art, Chicago (1991–92).

=== Death and legacy ===
González died on Christmas Eve of 1993 in New York City at the age of 51 from complications stemming from AIDS. His death was covered by major media outlets including The New York Times and The Miami Herald. His funeral was held in Church of the Little Flower, a prominent regional landmark in Coral Gables, where Gonzalez's art career began.

González career was the subject of the 1980 book Juan González: A Twentieth Century Baroque Painter (republished in 1991) as well as an in-depth, career-spanning retrospective book, Dreamscapes: The Art of Juan Gonzalez, written by Irene McManus and published by Hudson Hills Press.

González's art has been sold at leading fine art auction houses, including Sotheby's and Phillips.

== Style ==
González became known during the rise of the Hyperrealism movement in New York City during the 1970s. As such, he is known for creating paintings and collages that ranged from realism to surrealism and fantasy. He is therefore often categorized as a Magical Realist. Early in his career González was influenced by Pop artists David Hockney and James Rosenquist as well as the Renaissance and Baroque periods while he developed his highly personal representational-figurative style in direct opposition to the then-contemporary dominance of the Minimalism movement.

Throughout his career, González' themes and subject matter included religion, reinterpreted scenes from art history, portraits of family and friends, and psychologically introspective expressions of identity (via self-portraits) and his struggle with AIDS. His works were characterized by their rich detail, lifelike realism, and symbolism. Gonzalez's medium's included airbrush, oil, and acrylic paint as well as color pencil to facilitate his focused detailing.

== Awards ==
- 1991, 1985, 1980 National Endowment for the Arts
- 1977 CAPS (Creative Artists Program Services)
- 1976, 1974 Cintas Fellowship Award
- 1984-1987 Board of Governors, New York Foundation for the Arts
- 1979-1982 Served as a panelist on the New York State Council on the Arts
- 1971 Lowe Museum Ward Award.
- 1970, 1971 Klenkenberg Award, Lowe Art Museum

== Exhibitions ==
Select Solo Exhibitions:

- 1997 “Juan Gonzalez: Enchanted Visions,” Museum of Art, Fort Lauderdale, Florida
- 1993 International Bird Museum, Boca Raton, Florida
- 1991-92 The Meadows Museum, Dallas, Texas; Traveling to: Center for the Fine Arts, Miami, Florida; City Gallery of Contemporary Art, Raleigh, North Carolina; Museum of Fine Arts, Springfield, Massachusetts
- 1991 Nancy Hoffman Gallery, New York
- 1988 Cleveland Center for Contemporary Art, Ohio
- 1985 Nancy Hoffman Gallery, New York
- 1982 Nancy Hoffman Gallery, New York
- 1981 Center for Inter-American Relations, New York
- 1980-81 Frances Wolfson Art Gallery, Miami-Dade Community College, Florida; Traveling to: Gibbes Art Gallery, Charleston, South Carolina
- 1978 Nancy Hoffman Gallery, New York
- 1978 Tomasulo Gallery, Union College, Cranford, New Jersey
- 1975 Nancy Hoffman Gallery, New York
- 1973 Corcoran and Corcoran, Miami Florida
- 1972 Allan Stone Gallery, New York

== Collections ==
- The Metropolitan Museum of Art, New York
- Art Institute of Chicago, Illinois
- The Carnegie Museum of Art, Pittsburgh, Pennsylvania
- Hirshhorn Museum and Sculpture Garden, Washington, D.C.
- Chase Manhattan Bank, New York
- Bacardi Collection, Miami, Florida
- Cleveland Center for Contemporary Art, Ohio
- Danforth Museum of Art, Framingham, Massachusetts
- Indianapolis Museum of Art, Indiana
- The Meadows Museum, Dallas, Texas
- University of Oklahoma at Norman
- Vassar College Art Gallery, Poughkeepsie
- The Seavest Collection
- Lowe Art Museum, University of Miami, Coral Gables, Florida
- Pinedo Collection, Miami, Florida
- Permuy Collection, Coral Gables, Florida
- Allan Stone Collection, New York, New York
