= Jesús Permuy =

Cuban-American architect (born 1935)

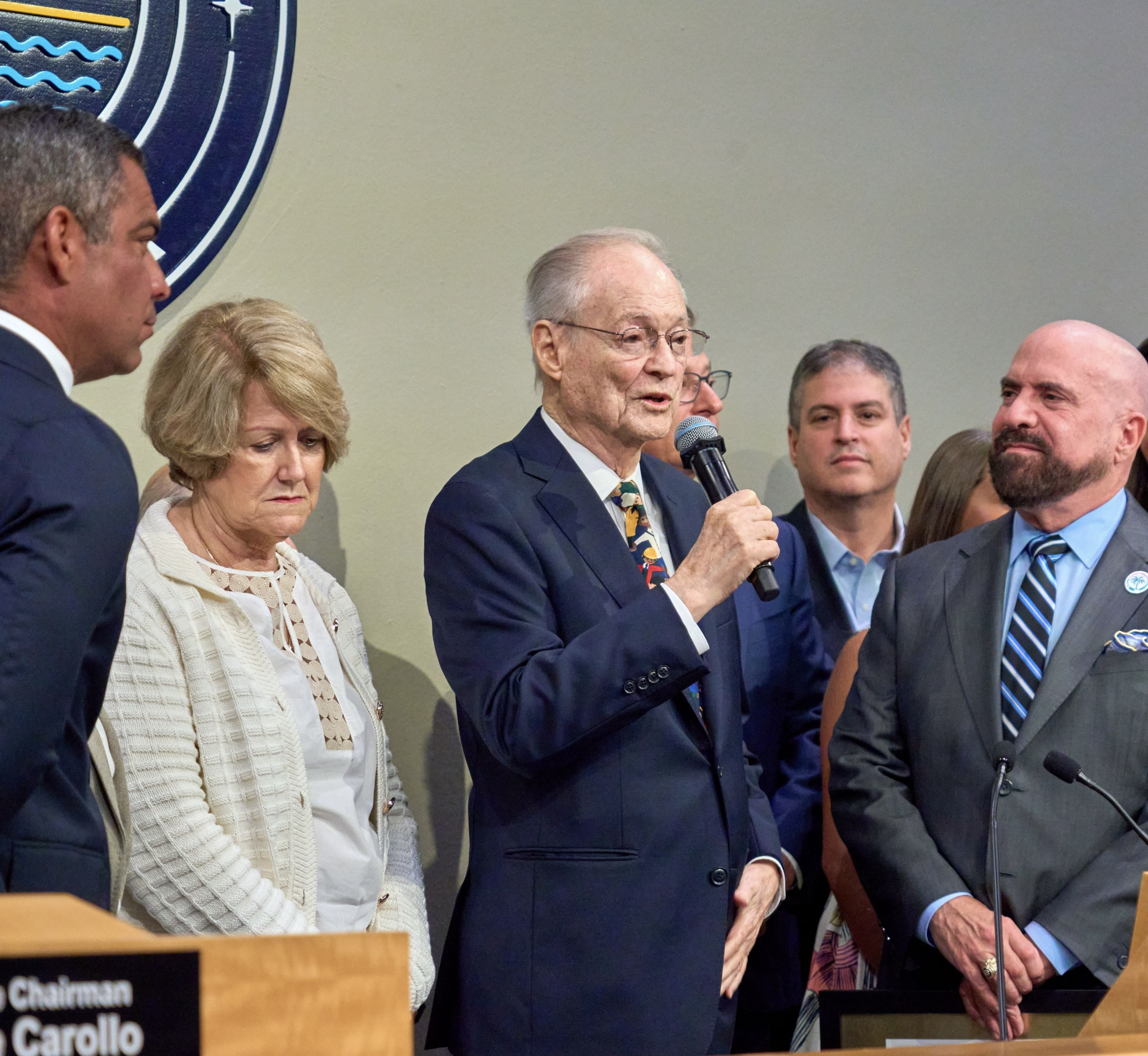
- Permuy addressing the Miami City Hall Commission Chambers, 2025.
- Born: August 30, 1935 (age 91); Havana, Cuba
- Education: University of Havana (BA), Catholic University of America (MCRP)
- Occupations: Architect, urban planner, human rights advocate, businessman, radio personality
- Years active: 1950s – Present

Jesús A. Permuy (born 1935) is a Cuban-American architect, urban planner, human rights activist, art collector, and businessman. He is known for an extensive career of community projects and initiatives in Florida, Washington, D.C., Europe, and Latin America.

== Biography ==
Jesús Permuy was born in Havana, Cuba to Spanish parents who had emigrated from the Galicia region of Spain to Havana a decade prior to his birth. After completing his secondary education, Permuy studied architecture at the School of Architecture and Planning in the University of Havana. His studies were interrupted by the outbreak of the Cuban Revolution.

Permuy played a leading role in the opposition to Fidel Castro and the Communist forces through the Movimiento de Recuperación Revolucionaria (Movement for Revolutionary Recovery – MRR), the most prominent faction in the anti-Castro counterrevolution coalition and resistance, eventually serving as its National Coordinator. Following the failed Bay of Pigs Invasion, he fled first to Venezuela for several months, and then permanently relocated to the United States where he joined the Cuban community in exile. There he continued both his architecture and urban planning studies and career. He would also become known internationally for taking up activism in support of democracy and human rights for the Cuban people in the face of ongoing abuses by the Castro government. As such, Permuy would become one of the leading figures organizing and mobilizing the international community against the Castro government from the 1970s to the early 21st century through various organizations and platforms, including the United Nations and the United States Congress.

In addition to his career in architecture, planning, and human rights activism, Permuy was a key member of the early Latin art community of Miami as an art collector and gallery owner during the 1970s. He launched The Permuy Gallery with his first wife, prominent art promoter Marta Permuy, which became historically significant as one of the first Cuban Art galleries in South Florida following the Cuban exodus. Over the course of his career Permuy has had leading public roles in multiple civic, community, and religious organizations, including service as a longtime Councilman of the Agrupacion Catolica Universitaria, and hosted a weekly radio show on Radio Paz. Following his legacy, the Permuy family has remained active in art, architecture, politics, and community development initiatives.

== Movement for Revolutionary Recovery ==
Following Fidel Castro's rise to power in 1959 in the aftermath of the Cuban Revolution and his subsequent dismantling of Cuba's democratic systems and institutions, Permuy became involved in efforts to advocate for democracy and organize resistance to the entrenchment of the Castro regime and its progression into authoritarian Communism. Permuy was first recruited into the Movimiento de Recuperación Revolucionaria (Movement for Revolutionary Recovery; MRR) in 1959 by Rogelio Gonzalez Corzo, the organization's National Coordinator.

Permuy initially helped lead the MRR's student arm, overseeing the members and activities in seven of the thirteen schools of the University of Havana, Cuba's primary university. Among his actions in the student branch of the movement, Permuy helped organize a major protest of over 100 University of Havana students against the state visit of top Soviet Minister Anastas Mikoyan on February 5, 1960, during which the protestors removed Mikoyan's wreath at the José Martí Monument in the Parque Central and replaced it with their own. Permuy was then arrested as a result of his role in the protest, though he was able to secure a release.

Permuy then joined the MRR's Security Division when he became Secretary of Security before being elevated to Civic Coordinator and ultimately serving as National Coordinator of the MRR following Curzo's execution by Castro's regime in 1961. Following the failure of the Bay of Pigs Invasion, Permuy fled to Venezuela through the Venezuelan Embassy in Cuba and remained there for several months under diplomatic protection until permanently relocating to the United States in 1962.

== Architecture and urban planning ==
An early notable project in Permuy's architecture career was the Colegio de Belen summer camp complex (officially: Campamento de Verano del Colegio de Belén en El Salado). Located in Playa El Salado near Playa Baracoa, Permuy designed the project alongside fellow Cuban architect Jorge Dorta-Duque in 1957. Built on a Jesuit property known as El Salado, the project created a new complex for the school to expand their summer programs, including eight pavilions, dormitories, a chapel, a cafeteria, and a game room. Prior to the Cuban Revolution, the camp offered sports activities, field trips to locations across Cuba, and language courses by Jesuit priests from the United States.

After relocating to Miami in 1962, Permuy continued working in the architecture field. During the 1960s and 1970s, Permuy was part of the architecture teams behind several prominent Florida structures and landmarks including the New World Tower and the Clearwater Marine Aquarium. Alongside his architecture career, in 1967 he received a Master of City and Regional Planning degree from the Catholic University of America in Washington, D.C., and became certified by both the American Institute of Certified Planners (AICP) and the American Planning Association. Permuy's thesis, The Town Center: A Unifying Force, Severna Park. Maryland: A Case Study of the Problem of Structuring Identity in a Suburban Situation, outlined his urban planning philosophy of elevating socioeconomic conditions for both individuals and communities, such as through the plaza design model of cultural gathering spaces; it has subsequently been cited in published literature by the Council of Planning Librarians and the U.S. Department of Education. While residing in Washington, D.C., Permuy served as Head Planner of the Anne Arundel County Planning and Zoning Department's Project Planning Section in Maryland.

After relocating back to South Florida in 1969, he served as Planning Division Supervisor of Metro Dade County (now Miami-Dade County) Department of Housing and Urban Development (HUD) until 1973, when the Miami Herald reported that he resigned from the position for the private sector role of Vice President of International Investment Group Inc.'s Housing and Development branch. During his tenure as Planning Division Supervisor, Permuy oversaw revitalization initiatives in several socioeconomically challenged areas as well as restoration programs of cultural resources and historic districts in the region, including in Coral Gables and Coconut Grove. He would later return to the public sector to serve in the Metro Dade County's Office of Transportation Administration as Development Planning Branch Chief from 1978 to 1980.

Permuy's community activism led to the establishment of Little Havana's Jose Marti Park in 1980. He began efforts to create a park for the growing Hispanic community in the area in 1972, applying his urban planning background to help select the eventual location in 1973. Permuy recommended a site on the Miami River, which was met with some protest, but unanimously approved by the Miami City Commission. Permuy would go on to be a member of the five-person jury that chose the final design from a pool of thirteen submissions. The park also served as a safe gathering place for children in the Miami area during the instability of the drug crisis of the 1970s and 1980s.

In 1983, Permuy was appointed by Maurice Ferré and the Miami City Commission to the East Little Havana Task Force, which was assembled that year to investigate and combat the deteriorating economic and living conditions in the area as a result of the Mariel boatlift crisis. He was elected Vice Chair of the Taskforce later that year. In 1984 he was made co-chairman and helped develop the East Little Havana Redevelopment Plan, which was submitted to the City of Miami at the conclusion of the Taskforce that year. During this period, Ferré also appointed Permuy as Vice President and Government Alternate of the Allapattah Advisory Board and Community Action Agency to develop long-term socioeconomic growth plans for the area.

Internationally, Permuy was appointed by El Salvador's President José Napoleón Duarte to lead the Earthquake Reconstruction Committee in the aftermath of the 1986 San Salvador earthquake and consequently spent the following year training Salvadoran officials on modern urban planning principles following the reconstruction. While assisting with the rebuilding and regional planning efforts in the area, Permuy also worked with USAID to develop the Municipalities in Action program. Managed by Permuy's United Schools of America group, the program trained mayors and other local leaders and officials in El Salvador and Guatemala on how to manage and support democratic governments and institutions from 1986 to 1988.

Permuy has also been a frequent guest lecturer, traveling nationally and internationally to share his expertise and design philosophy with several leading institutions including Johns Hopkins University, Columbia University, the University of Miami, and Florida International University. Permuy also served as a Jury Member for the University of Miami Department of Architecture and Planning, and has taught graduate-level urban planning courses at Florida International University in the 1980s.

His 21st century projects have included leading the effort to establish a memorial to Cuban priest and independence leader Félix Varela at his original tomb in St. Augustine’s historic Tolomato Cemetery, creating a pilgrimage site for the Cuban diaspora. Permuy has also served on several civic and community boards, panels, and committees. These included the board of the Miami-Dade Employment and Economic Development Corporation, the Miami Dade County Affordable Housing Advisory Board (AHAB) (2006, 2007), and ten years on the City of Miami's Urban Development Review Board (UDRB) (2008 to 2018) the Latin Community Board. Permuy currently serves on the Miami-Dade County Social and Economic Development Council, and is a Principal in the firm Permuy Architecture.

== Human rights activism ==
Jesús Permuy has been a prominent figure in spotlighting human rights in Cuba after the Cuban Revolution since emigrating to the United States. From 1967 to 2006, Permuy led or represented several international organizations and non-governmental organizations (NGOs) active on the world stage, and partnered with human rights NGOs including Amnesty International, Freedom House, the International Association of Educators for World Peace, and the International Association for the Defense of Religious Liberty. His international human rights advocacy included official activities with the United Nations, the United States Congress, the United States Department of State, world leaders, diplomats, military and cultural figures.

In 1967, Permuy was founder and President of the Washington D.C. delegation of the Christian Democratic Movement of Cuba, also referred to as the Cuban Christian Democrat Movement, an organization Permuy would play a leading role in for decades. After returning to Miami from Washington D.C. in the late 1960s, Permuy founded the Center for Human Rights of Miami (also known as the Human Rights Center of Miami) in 1974 and served as its president for over thirty years. The center advocated for human rights internationally, helped release Cuban political prisoners, and reconnect emigrating families in Cuba with their relatives in the United States. The City of Miami supported the Human Rights Center by offering the use of the newly-established Manuel Artime Community Center as its headquarters. In 1978, Permuy secured NGO Consultative Status for Christian Democratic International (CDI) at the United Nations Commission on Human Rights (UNCHR), allowing the Center for Human Rights, through its affiliation with CDI, to present evidence and coordinate efforts with foreign delegations and the international press. By the late 1970s Permuy was elected President of the Christian Democratic Movement of Cuba. When Permuy began his international diplomatic trips with the Center for Human Rights in the 1970s, he funded his trips through grassroots small donations from the Greater Miami community, including phone-in radio marathons, a tradition that would continue for more than 20 years into the 1990s.

The 1980s would be a turning point in Permuy's human rights campaign in which substantial gains would become evident, though not yet systemic. The Center for Human Rights continued to grow in its membership and the scope of activities with a major development being the addition of prominent Franciscan priest and artist Miguel Angel Loredo, who would become another high profile member of the Center's delegations as well as its Vice President. Other key members of the Center included Maria C. Garcia Palacio, Jose A. Costa, Alcides Martinez, Rafael Naranjo, and Rodolfo I. Yaniz. Delegations of representatives from the Center would regularly travel to the UNCHR headquarters in Geneva as well as the United Nations Headquarters in New York City, and Permuy would also travel frequently to Washington D.C. for key gatherings of leaders such as the National Prayer Breakfast. During this period Permuy would also meet on several occasions with Pope John Paul II to brief him on the conditions of human rights and religious freedom in Cuba in the 1980s and 1990s.

In 1984, the Center for Human Rights of Miami successfully lobbied to have Cuba's diplomatic representative Luis Sola Vila removed from a key subcommittee of the UNCHR and replaced with a representative from Ireland, a Christian-Democratic ally of Permuy's international campaign. That year The Miami Herald also published a profile of the Cuban Christian Democrat Movement (also known as MDC) that stated Permuy spearheaded an international diplomatic strategy to call out the Castro regime's human rights abuses and work with other Christian-Democratic governments to withhold international support until governmental changes were made. By that point the MDC had grown to have chapters in several large cities with significant Cuban populations such as New York City and Los Angeles.

In the 1990s there had been a substantial change in the political climate in Geneva as the UN Commission on Human Rights had shifted from initial rejection, then indifference and towards embrace of Permuy's diplomatic efforts. This was part of a broader international shift that included support from Amnesty International, which had once been hesitant to address Cuban human rights abuses but in the 1990s endorsed and began collaborating with Permuy to highlight Cuban political prisoner cases in its campaigns. This also coincided with the post-Cold War Special Period in Cuba during which Castro's international influence waned following the collapse of the Soviet Union and Soviet Bloc alliance.

In 1992 Permuy testified to the House of Representatives as President of the Christian Democratic Party to push for the Cuban Democracy Act during the Special Period in Cuba following the conclusion of the Cold War. The bill passed and was signed into law by President George H. W. Bush on October 23, 1992.

In 1993, Permuy and a delegation from the Center for Human Rights participated in an event with Cuban singer Celia Cruz in Geneva organized by Cuban-Swiss gallerist Orlando Blanco in which Cruz voiced support for their efforts to bring democracy to Cuba and the release of Cuban political prisoners. That year Permuy also coordinated efforts to establish an independent news agency in Cuba to report news that was censored by the Castro government and bring attention to recent human rights abuses more quickly.

In 1994, during the early stages of the unfolding Cuban Balerso crisis, Permuy was the first to brief U.S. Ambassador to the United Nations Geraldine Ferraro on the situation in Guantánamo Bay. At the end of the year Permuy traveled to Panama representing the Center for Human Rights during Operations Safe Haven and Safe Passage. He had met with Operations Commanding Officer General Barry McCaffrey and helped mediate between the Cuban rioters and U.S. forces, eventually resolving a hunger strike, through problems persisted with the Operations after his return. The crisis ultimately resolved in 1995 with the Clinton Administration allowing most detained refugees to be processed and immigrate into the United States, and was also notable for the subsequent development of the Wet Foot Dry Foot policy in U.S.-Cuba relations.

In 1996 the Cuban government shot down two unarmed humanitarian planes, causing an international incident. Permuy denounced the Cuban government in the UN Commission on Human Rights while representing the International Association of Educators for World Peace to bring greater international attention to the issue as a violation of human rights. In response to the controversy, the United Nations Security Council passed the U.S.-sponsored Security Council Resolution 1067 to pressure Cuba to comply with international aviation requirements, including the Convention on International Civil Aviation relating to the non-use of weapons against civil aircraft.

In 1998 Permuy testified again to the United States Congress on the human rights situation in Cuba.

In addition to his work in the Center for Human Rights and the Christian Democratic Movement of Cuba, Permuy had also held leadership roles in several organizations from the 1970s to the 2000s that raised awareness of human rights abuses in Cuba and other dictatorships, where he engaged in lobbying, media campaigns, and co-founded commissions and subcommittees to support diplomatic efforts in support of human rights. These included serving as Vice President and co-founder of the Human Rights Commission of Christian Democratic International, Vice President of the Christian Democratic Organization of America's Caribbean Region, President of the Christian Democratic Party of Cuba, as well as President and later Chairman of the Cuban Municipalities in Exile. In the early 2000s, Permuy served as President of Unidad Cubana (Cuban Unity), an influential federation of over thirty Cuban organizations advocating for the Cuban community in exile.

Though primarily known for his efforts to advocate for the human rights of Cubans, Permuy has also advocated on behalf of and highlighted causes in Africa, Latin America and the Caribbean, Europe and Asia, including Sierra Leone, Ivory Coast, Senegal, Western Sahara, Haiti, Nicaragua, El Salvador, Honduras, Lithuania, and the Philippines.

Permuy's international impact in the area of human rights have been acknowledged by several contemporary and governmental sources. In 2018, then-Coral Gables Mayor Raul Valdes-Fauli stated Permuy's "human rights activities on behalf of Cuba have been significant and very influential" and former Miami Mayor and radio personality Tomás Regalado credited Permuy with inventing the strategy of the international human rights campaign against the Castro regime, adding "Little by little, the human rights cause of Cuba became something of importance to the world. So when we write the real Cuban history, we owe several pages to Jesús [Permuy]." In 2025, the City of Miami honored Permuy's human rights contributions in "working with the United Nations, U.S. State Department, and international partners to secure the release of hundreds of political prisoners and spotlight Cuba’s human rights abuses" and "earning respect across political, cultural, and international spheres."

== The arts ==
Permuy's work in the arts, particularly Cuban art, began in his years as a student in the University of Havana. In that time he was part of a well-regarded student design publication, Espacio, through which he became acquainted with many artists, including Amelia Peláez and José María Mijares. He began designing layouts for the magazine before serving as its last director when it was shut down in 1957 as a result of the Cuban Revolution. He also served as cultural secretary of the University Student Federation (Federacion Estudiantil Universitaria) and in 1959 organized a major week-long multidisciplinary art event in the university called Operación Cultura (Operation Culture). Held in the University of Havana's Plaza Cadenas, Operación Cultura was designed to celebrate Cuban culture and showcase the university as a pro-democracy center of free thought in contrast to the Castro regime's increasing restraint of expression. Its participants included several prominent Cuban cultural figures including modernist painters Peláez, Mijares, Cundo Bermúdez, Rafael Soriano, members of the Cuban Vanguardia, as well as noted sculptors including Roberto Estopiñán and Tony Lopez. As a multidisciplinary event, Operación Cultura also featured leading Cuban writers such as leading poet Carmina Benguría, journalist Sergio Carbó, and former Cuban Minister of Foreign Affairs Jorge Mañach. The event drew an estimated 50,000 attendees and was inaugurated by Cuban President Manuel Urrutia Lleó.

After relocating to the United States following the revolution, exiled Cuban artists struggled as their patrons had little to spend on the arts. As a result, many went back to school despite being known names in Cuba to become accredited in the American art market, though there were few spaces to display their work in the meantime. Recognizing this need and the role of art to help shape and reaffirm a community's cultural identity, Jesús initiated the Permuy Gallery, located at 1901 Le Jeune Road in Coral Gables, Florida with his first wife, Cuban art dealer and patron Marta Permuy. Through its run in the early and mid 1970s, the Permuy Gallery was significant for being one of the first Cuban art galleries in the United States following the Cuban exodus and held many events, exhibitions, and cultural salon gatherings. It was also credited with beginning the Friday Gallery Nights tradition that continues in Coral Gables. The gallery featured the artwork of several renowned and established Cuban artists as well as newcomers seeking to launch their careers across painting, drawing, ceramic, and sculpture. Many artists were friends of the Permuys while others would later become part of their social circles through the gallery. Some notable featured artists included: Peláez, Mijares, Wifredo Lam, René Portocarrero, Víctor Manuel García Valdés, Cundo Bermúdez, Juan Gonzalez, Rafael Soriano, Emilio Falero, Dionisio Perkins, and Lourdes Gomez-Franca. Several of the artists shared a background in architecture with Permuy, including Baruj Salinas, Miguel Jorge, and Rafael Consuegra, which also influenced their art.

The Permuy Gallery had a legacy that extended beyond its five-year run. The Permuys continued to host art salon gatherings of Cuban artists, collectors, writers, politicians, and business leaders in their Coral Gables residence, the Permuy House, in addition to occasional private exhibitions. In 2018 the Permuy Architecture firm began hosting an annual holiday art exhibition in honor of the Permuy Gallery and its legacy. The tradition is held on a Friday as a nod to the Friday Gallery Nights and features artwork from the Permuy collection.

== Family ==
Both Jesús Permuy's parents were Spaniards from the Galicia region of ancestry descendant of the Permuy family of minor Galician nobility through his father's lineage. His parents relocated to Cuba in the early 20th century during the period of political turmoil in Spain between the Rif War and the Spanish Civil War. His father, a businessman, died when Permuy was a child, therefore he and his two brothers were raised by their mother. After his own emigration to the United States and career there, he went on to have seven children with his first wife, Marta, and one child with his second wife Marie Carmen. His children and grandchildren have furthered his legacy in the community through their own subsequent careers. His eldest son, Ignacio Permuy, is also an architect and the President and founder of the Permuy Architecture firm, in which Jesús is a principal. Another son, Pedro Pablo Permuy, continued the family's involvement in politics through an extensive career that included serving as a senior advisor to Secretary of State Madeleine Albright, and later being appointed by President Bill Clinton to serve as Deputy Assistant Secretary of Defense during his second term. Jesús Permuy is also uncle-in-law to the late MasTec and Cuban American National Foundation founder Jorge Mas Canosa. His other children and grandchildren are active in finance, construction, real estate, fashion, and design. The Permuy family also remains active in the arts as artists, collectors, and curators.

== Recognition ==
Congressman Lincoln Díaz-Balart referenced Permuy in a speech on the floor of the U.S. House of Representatives in 1994 as "a distinguished member of the community that I am honored to represent". In 2010, the Miami-Dade County Mayor Carlos Álvarez and the County Commission awarded him a Certificate of Appreciation in recognition of his service on the Social and Economic Development Council and his work in the community.

In 2017, Congresswoman Ileana Ros-Lehtinen gave a Statement of Congressional Record on the floor of the House of Representatives to pay tribute to his life and career and calling him "a shining example to us all". In 2018, a public ceremony was held in his honor during which Ros-Lehtinen presented him with a Flag of the United States that she had flown over the United States Capitol earlier that year in recognition of his community contributions. Permuy was also presented with the Key to the City of Coral Gables, Florida by Mayor Raul Valdes-Fauli. During the ceremony remarks, Miami River Commission chairman Horacio Aguirre stated Permuy was "one of Miami's finest architects," citing his many architecture and urban planning projects.

In October 2019, Miami-Dade County honored Permuy by co-designating a portion of Miami Avenue in Downtown Miami bordering Brickell Avenue and U.S. Route 1 as "Jesús A. Permuy Street". The resolution was sponsored by County Commissioner and former Miami Mayor Xavier Suarez and passed unanimously. The dedication ceremony was held in Miami City Hall on February 18, 2020, to coincide with the 60th anniversary of Permuy's involvement in a pro-democracy protest against the 1960 Havana state visit of top Soviet Premier Anastas Mikoyan. Speakers in the ceremony included his sons Ignacio and Pedro Pablo as well as former Miami Mayor Tomás Regalado, then-Coral Gables Vice Mayor Vince Lago, and the keynote delivered by Xavier Suarez.

In 2025, Permuy was presented with the Key to the City of Miami by Miami Mayor Francis Suarez and a City Proclamation by Miami Commissioner Damian Pardo to mark his 90th birthday and in recognition of his "transformative legacy in Miami and beyond serving as a shining example of leadership rooted in justice, culture, and human dignity." The ceremony was noted as a rare instance of a Proclamation being read in its entirety during a Miami City Commission meeting. That year Permuy was also interviewed for the Freedom Tower's Centennial Oral History Project, as well as by the FIU Maurice Ferré Institute for Civic Leadership. The latter was published in 2026 as part of the Ferré Institute's Archival Video Series on Leadership.
