= Torah Project =

Annotated and illustrated volume of the Five Books of Moses

The Torah Project is an annotated and illustrated limited edition volume containing the Five Books of Moses. The handcrafted book was created as part of the 2013 project, which was started by book publisher ACC Arte Scritta. It was released in Italy in 2017. Each copy includes a handwritten blessing by Pope Francis and has been presented to multiple world leaders during its launch.

== History ==
At the end of 2013, Ricardo De La Fuente and Maria Cecilia Braschi, the founders of ACC Arte Scritta, came up with the idea, at the Guadalajara International Book Fair, to create an illustrated edition of the Torah called 'The Torah Project', which would contain creative, and inspirational artworks of Jewish culture. Mexican Jewish art collector Dan Tartakovsky was the patron of the project, and he recruited the Cuban-American Jewish artist Baruj Salinas to illustrate the book.

== The Torah Project Book ==
This book contains the Five Books of Moses, Genesis, Exodus, Leviticus, Numbers and Deuteronomy, in the original Hebrew text. It is a Chumash, a printed edition of the Torah.

It also contains commentaries from personalities in art and biblical studies, which have been translated into four languages — English, Spanish, Italian, and German. Each copy of The Torah Project also includes a handwritten blessing by Pope Francis, which says: “I want to bless all those who have worked in the production of this Torah, which is the word of God, that must unite us in love forever.”

The cover of the Torah Project book represents the city of Jerusalem, and it is made out of wood and pearl. In between the chapters of the Torah, there are 27 lithograph paintings created by noted Jewish artist Baruj Salinas.

The book was printed by Stamperia Santa Chiara in Urbino. This traditional, family-owned business uses massive hand-operated printing presses.

The carved wood book covers were hand crafted by Gentili of Fossombrone. Book binding was completed by Steri of Corciano. About 500 craftspeople participated in the book's production.

== Art ==
Original artwork by Baruj Salinas commissioned for the Torah Project book:

== Presentations ==
The book has been published in an edition of 126 copies. They have been presented to museums and universities around the world. Other copies were sold to private collectors.

=== Presentation to the Vatican ===
On 23 February 2017, the first copy of The Torah Project book was presented to Pope Francis at the Vatican. Also present was Rabbi Abraham Skorka, from Buenos Aires, ACC Arte Scritta, and scholars in biblical studies and art. One of the guests was Adolfo D. Roitman, the curator of the Shrine of the Book, which holds the Dead Sea Scrolls at the Israel Museum in Jerusalem. In addition, many of the people who created the book were present, with their families.

Skorka pointed out in his speech to the Pope and the papal audience that “This is intended as a small, yet very significant cry to eradicate the hatred and animosities that are so tragically perceived today”. Pope Francis expressed his appreciation for the Torah as a “thoughtful gesture” and that it is “the Lord’s gift, his revelation, his word”. He indicated that the editor's note inside this edition of the Torah indicates the “dialogical approach” that the relations between Catholics and Jews is “a cultural vision of openness, mutual respect, and peace that accords with the spiritual message of the Torah.” He also recognised the efforts and expertise of the craftsmen and artisans, and acknowledged how they added more value to the Torah with colorful illustrations. The Pope said that the gift of this edition of the Torah to the Vatican "is fully embedded" in "fraternal and institutional dialogue between Jews and Christians" that "is expressed not only through words but also in deeds."

Pope Francis received the first copy of this edition of the Torah and it will be added to the Vatican Secret Archives. The book was presented to the Pope by a group of Jewish and Christian children.

=== Presentations to world leaders ===
A copy was presented to Israeli president Reuven Rivlin on 27 April 2017. Copies were also presented to other prominent world leaders, including German Chancellor Angela Merkel as well as the monarchs of Spain and Sweden.

== See also ==
- Hebrew Bible
