= Cuban identity =

Cuban identity refers to the unique conditions of being considered Cuban. Despite the definition of being Cuban often being tied directly to Cuban nationality, many still consider themselves Cuban despite their loss of official Cuban nationality by birth or having never been born in Cuba at all. Being Cuban has been considered a mere national origin to a broader ethnicity. There are three main concepts that have been used to describe what is Cuban. Cubanidad is the whole general condition of being Cuban, Cubaneo is the condition of being Cuban based on the practice of customs and other cultural expressions considered to be Cuban, and Cubanía is the condition of being Cuban based solely of off the personal want to be considered Cuban. Differing views exist on to what extent Cubanidad can be claimed and to what degrees it exists for those who do not reside in Cuba, usually based on that persons relationship to life and family in Cuba.

Cuban culture and people were formed from a mixture of indigenous people, African slaves, and European migrants. Most often residing in Cuba meant defining oneself in relation to the foreign power that controlled Cuba, such as the Spanish Empire. The origins of a Cuban identity can be traced to the earliest debates about Cuban self-determination, and expanded more greatly with the Cuban independence movement. As more Cubans began emigrating during the Cuban exile the idea of Cuban identity began to expand to those outside Cuba and the idea of being Cuban took on a racialized definition.

== See also ==
- Cubans
- Cuban culture
