= United Nations Security Council Resolution 1067 =

UN Security Council Resolution 1067
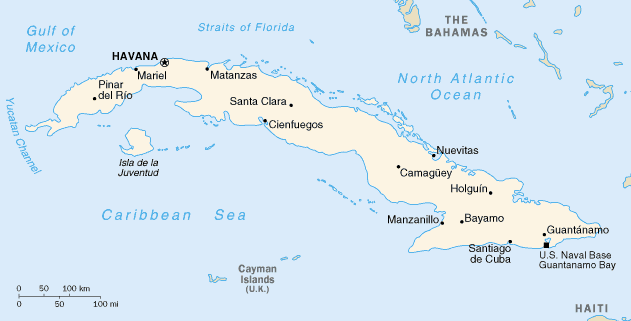
- Cuba and surrounding waters
- Date: 26 July 1996
- Meeting no.: 3,683
- Code: S/RES/1067 (Document)
- Subject: Shooting down of two civil aircraft on 24 February 1996
- Voting summary: 13 voted for; None voted against; 2 abstained
- Result: Adopted

Security Council composition
- Permanent members: China; France; Russia; United Kingdom; United States
- Non-permanent members: Botswana; Chile; Egypt; Guinea-Bissau; Germany; Honduras; Indonesia; Italy; South Korea; Poland

United Nations Security Council resolution 1067, adopted on 26 July 1996, after noting various statements and resolutions by the President of the Security Council and International Civil Aviation Organization (ICAO) deploring the shooting down of two civilian aircraft by the Cuban Air Force on 24 February 1996, the Council called on Cuba to comply with international obligations relating to aviation, particularly the Convention on International Civil Aviation.

China and Russia abstained from voting on Resolution 1067, which was approved by the other 13 members of the council. China and Russia believed that the resolution was singling out Cuba in the incident for condemnation, and instead should have issued a call which urged states both to refrain from shooting down civilian airplanes as well as to prevent the improper use of civil aviation.

The Security Council recalled the sovereignty that all countries had in the airspace above their territory and territorial waters. In this regard, all countries had to abide by principles, rules and standards in the Convention on International Civil Aviation (Chicago Convention), including rules relating to the interception and non-use of weapons against civil aircraft.

The resolution noted that the shooting down of the two planes, which were part of the Brothers to the Rescue organisation run by Cuban exiles, was a violation of the principle that no weapons were to be used against civil aircraft in flight and that, when intercepting such aircraft, the lives of those on board not should be jeopardised. Cuba had argued that the flights were provocative acts in its airspace. Condolences were expressed to the families of the four persons who died as a result of the interception, which was condemned by the council. All the parties were called to respect international civil aviation laws and procedure, while at the same time reaffirming the right of states to use appropriate measures against aircraft being used for purposes contrary to that of the Chicago Convention.

All states that had not yet ratified the Chicago Convention were urged to do so, while the decision of the ICAO to investigate standards and practices to avoid a similar incident in the future was welcomed.

== See also ==
- Cuba – United States relations
- List of United Nations Security Council Resolutions 1001 to 1100 (1995–1997)
