= Fernando Morais =

Brazilian journalist

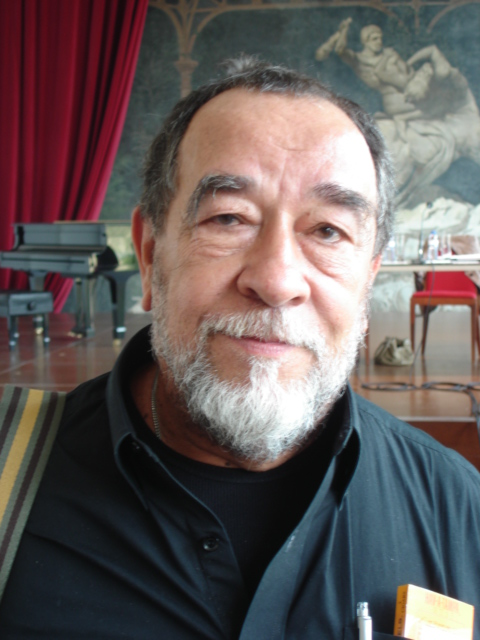
- Born: Fernando Gomes de Morais; July 22, 1946 (age 80); Mariana, Minas Gerais, Brazil
- Occupations: Journalist; biographer; writer; politician
- Writing career
- Language: Portuguese
- Genres: Non-fiction, journalism, biography,

Fernando Gomes de Morais (born July 22, 1946) is a Brazilian journalist, biographer, politician and writer. He wrote biographies and books on a series of Brazilian historical personalities and events, many of which were adapted into film.

== Life and career ==
Morais was born in Mariana. He started in journalism when he was 15 years old. In 1961, he was then a courier in a magazine edited by a bank in Belo Horizonte, when he had to cover the absence of their only journalist at a press conference. At age 18 he moved to São Paulo having worked for Veja, Jornal da Tarde, Folha de S. Paulo, TV Cultura and portal IG. He was awarded the Esso Award three times and the Prêmio Abril four times.

His first editorial success was A Ilha, an account of a trip to Cuba. After that, Moraes wrote other biographies and non-fiction books, such as Olga, Chatô, o Rei do Brasil and O Mago.

=== In politics ===
Fernando was state deputy for eight years and State Secretary of Culture (1988-1991) and Education (1991-1993) for São Paulo, during the governments of Orestes Quércia and Luiz Antônio Fleury Filho.

== Bibliography ==
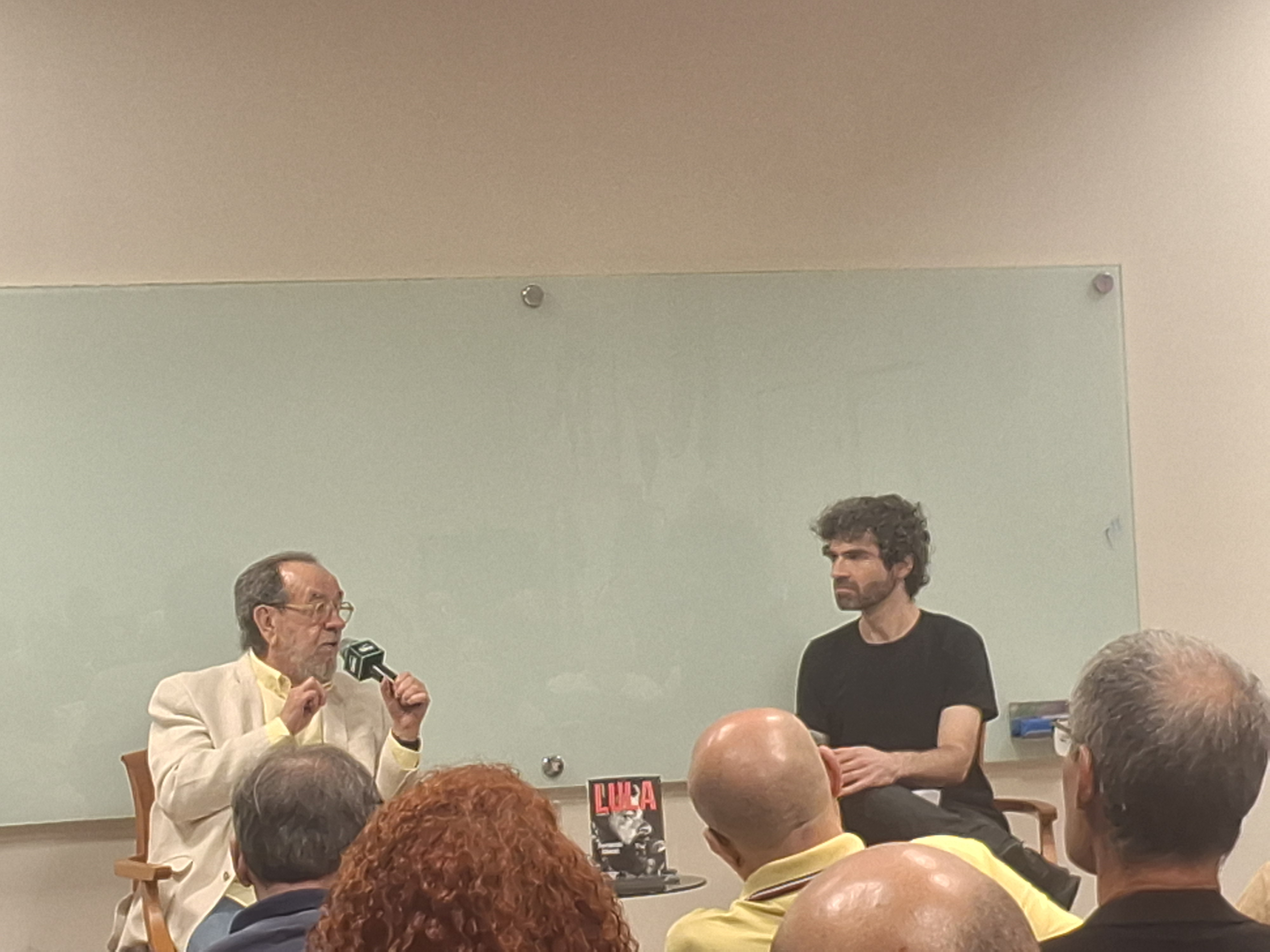
Fernando Morais with Lula, Volume 2 in São Paulo, 2026.

- 1976 - A Ilha
- 1985 - Olga - A biography of the Communist activist Olga Benário Prestes, adapted into a film in 2004.(English edition Olga: Revolutionary and Martyr. ISBN 9780802141897)
- 1994 - Chatô, o Rei do Brasil - A biography of the media mogul Assis Chateaubriand, adapted into film in 2016.
- 2000 - Corações Sujos - A non-fiction book about the Japanese terrorist organization Shindo Renmei, adapted into film in 2011.
- 2003 - Cem Quilos de Ouro
- 2005 - Na Toca dos Leões
- 2006 - Montenegro, as aventuras do Marechal que fez uma revolução nos céus do Brasil
- 2008 - O Mago - An authorized biography of the writer Paulo Coelho.(English edition: Paulo Coelho: A Warrior's Life: The Authorized Biography. ISBN 9780061718885)
- 2011 - Os Últimos Soldados da Guerra Fria (English edition: The Last Soldiers of the Cold War. ISBN 9781781688762), adapted into the 2019 film Wasp Network.
- 2021 - Lula, Volume 1 - First part of the biography of Luiz Inácio Lula da Silva. (English edition Lula: A Biography. ISBN 978-1-80429-806-0)
- 2026 - Lula, Volume 2 - Second part of the biography of Luiz Inácio Lula da Silva.
