= Brothers to the Rescue =

Anti-Cuba organization run by Cuban exiles in Florida, US

- Hermanos al Rescate
- Purpose: Aid balseros and dissidents in Cuba
- Location: Miami, United States
- Methods: Rescue rafters spotted in the Florida straits by aircraft; Airdropping dissident leaflets over Cuba
- Website: hermanos.org

Brothers to the Rescue (Spanish: Hermanos al Rescate) is an American activist nonprofit organization based in Miami, Florida, headed by José Basulto, who testified that he had been a CIA operative. Formed by Cuban exiles, the group is widely known for its opposition to the Cuban government and its former leader Fidel Castro. The group describes itself as a humanitarian organization aiming to assist and rescue raft refugees emigrating from Cuba and to "support the efforts of the Cuban people to free themselves from dictatorship through the use of active non-violence".

The organization was founded in May 1991 "after several pilots were touched by the death of" fifteen-year-old Gregorio Perez Ricardo, who "fleeing Castro's Cuba on a raft, perished of severe dehydration in the hands of U.S. Coast Guard officers who were attempting to save his life."

The Cuban government accuses the organization of involvement in terrorist acts, and infiltrated the group (see Juan Pablo Roque and the Wasp Network). In 1996, two Brothers to the Rescue aircraft were shot down by the Cuban Air Force in international airspace, which was condemned internationally although defended by the Cuban government. In May 2026 US Federal prosecutors announced charges against former Cuban President Raúl Castro relating to the shootdown.

== History ==
=== Humanitarian missions ===
Sample political leaflet dropped by Brothers to the Rescue on Cuba in 1996

In its early years, the group actively rescued rafters from Cuba and claims to have saved thousands of Cubans who were emigrating from the country. Eventually, the group's focus shifted after changes in US immigration policy meant that rafters would be sent back to Cuba.

The group's founder has stated that after August 1995, it stopped seeing rafters in the water. Heavily dependent on funding for rafting activities, the group's funding rapidly dropped to $320,455 in 1995, down from $1.5 million the year before. As a result, the group focused more on civil disobedience against the Cuban government. At least once, the group's founder dropped leaflets on Cuba.

=== Roque and Wasp Network ===
One of the group's pilots, Cuban Juan Pablo Roque, a former major in the Cuban air force, unexpectedly left on February 23, 1996, the day before the two planes were shot down, and turned up in Havana, where he condemned the group. Roque had left Cuba four years earlier and was recruited by the Brothers shortly afterward, flying several missions.

Despite being dismissed as a Cuban agent by US officials, Roque denied working for the Cuban government and claimed to have returned home after being disillusioned with the Brothers. He claimed that they had plans to carry out attacks on military bases in Cuba and to disrupt its defense communications.

Roque appeared on Cuban television on February 26, 1996, where he denounced the Brothers as an illegal and anti-Cuban organization the fundamental purpose of which is to provoke incidents that aggravated relations between Cuba and United States. In an interview with the International Civil Aviation Organization (ICAO), he stated that the group had planned to introduce anti-personnel weapons into Cuba and blow up high tension pylons to interrupt the energy supply.

While in Miami, Roque had contacts with and was paid by the FBI. His claims brought questions about the role of agencies such as the FBI and CIA in the activities of the exile community. However, White House spokesperson David Johnson said that "there does not exist, nor has there existed, any tie between the North American intelligence services and Hermanos al Rescate", adding that the organization is "not a front" for those services, nor is it financed by them. The organisation's leader José Basulto testified in a 2001 court case that he had been a CIA operative in the 1960s and had conducted CIA operations against the Cuban government, but denied that his activities since the 1960s had been linked with the CIA. He agreed with US officials that Roque was a Cuban spy who, along with the Wasp Network, infiltrated the Brothers.

Rene Gonzalez, another Wasp Network spy, also infiltrated Brothers to the Rescue and regularly sabotaged aircraft and reported on its activities until his subsequent arrest.

=== 1996 aircraft shootdown ===
On February 24, 1996, two Brothers to the Rescue Cessna Skymasters involved in releasing leaflets to fall on Cuba were shot down by a Cuban Air Force MiG-29UB. The four people in the aircraft were killed: Carlos Costa, Armando Alejandre, Jr., Mario de la Peña, and Pablo Morales. The shooting drew widespread reactions from members of the Cuban exile community, including Jesús Permuy and Jorge Mas Canosa, and sparked an international diplomatic incident.

On March 4, 2026, Florida Attorney General James Uthmeier announced at a news conference in Miami that a state-level criminal investigation into former Cuban leader Raúl Castro's role in the shootdown would be reopened; this has been described as "an escalation of the Trump administration's pressure campaign against Cuba". Uthmeier stated that a previous investigation had been shut down during Biden's presidency. The announcement came as several Florida lawmakers, including former Florida Governor Rick Scott and Representatives María Elvira Salazar and Carlos Gimenez, called on the US government to reopen its federal criminal investigation into Castro's alleged role in the incident.

== See also ==
- Cuba–United States relations
