= José Basulto =

CIA-trained Cuban exile (born 1940)

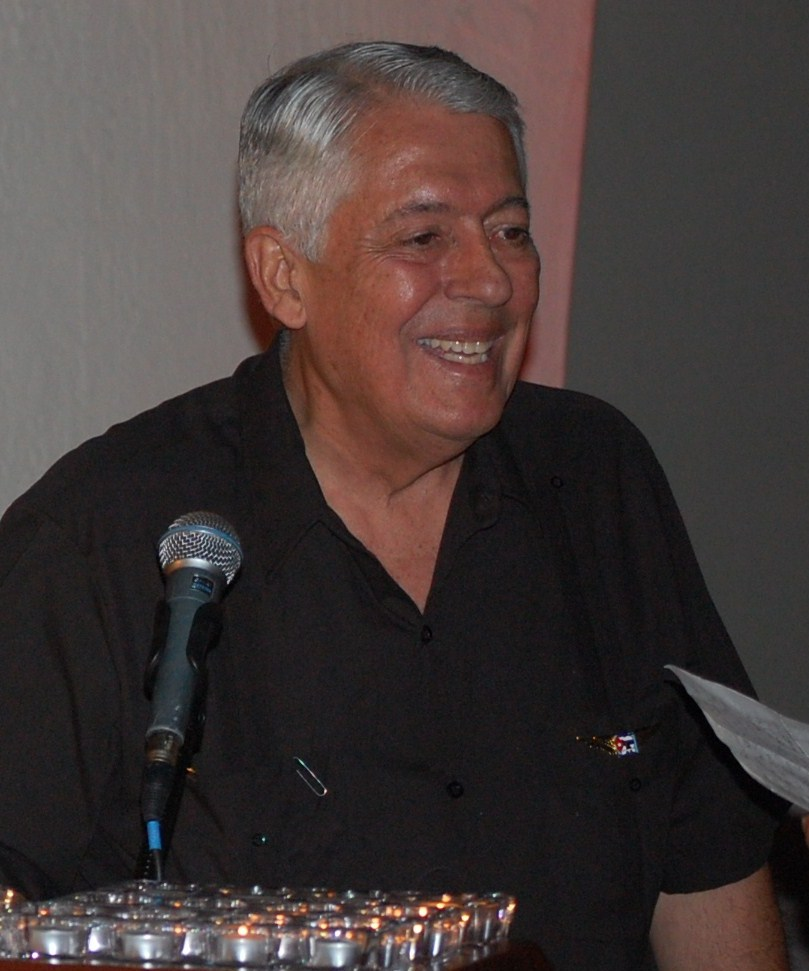
- Basulto in Miami, Florida, U.S.A. in 2010
- Born: José Jesús Basulto León; August 8, 1940 (age 85); Santiago de Cuba, Cuba
- Occupations: Pilot; Aviator
- Known for: Leader of Brothers to the Rescue

José Jesús Basulto León (born August 8, 1940) is a former CIA-trained Cuban political dissident and the leader of the nonprofit Cuban exile organization Brothers to the Rescue.

== Career ==
Since the Cuban Revolution, Basulto participated in various activities intended to subvert or overthrow the Cuban government. After the revolution, he claimed that he was trained by the CIA in intelligence, communications, explosives, sabotage and subversion in Panama, Guatemala, and the United States. He claimed that he was later placed back into Cuba, posing as a physics student at the University of Santiago to help prepare the ground for the Bay of Pigs Invasion.

According to Basulto, in 1961, under CIA sponsorship, Basulto infiltrated Cuba for a commando operation intended to sabotage an alleged missile site, a mission which was ultimately aborted. In August 1962 he was involved in an expedition of the Directorio Revolucionario Estudantil which took a boat to Cuba and fired a 20 mm cannon at a hotel, though nobody was killed in the incident.

In the 1980s Basulto flew medical supplies to the Nicaraguan Contras.

After the Cuban government shot down the Brothers to the Rescue planes, Basulto sought to have criminal and civil charges pressed over the matter. He was awarded a $1.7 million judgement in January 2005. On May 24 of that same year, Basulto announced a one million dollar reward for information leading to the indictment of Raúl Castro on drug charges or charges related to the shooting of the Hermanos planes. "It would throw a wrench in the machinery", Basulto said of a possible indictment.

== Aviator and leader of Brothers to the Rescue ==
Brothers to the Rescue formed in 1991 and describes itself as a humanitarian organization aiming to assist and rescue raft refugees emigrating from Cuba and to "support the efforts of the Cuban people to free themselves from dictatorship through the use of active nonviolence".

The Cuban government, on the other hand, accuses them of involvement in terrorist acts. In the course of many flights throughout the early 1990s, the group's planes made repeated incursions into Cuban territory. While these were widely considered airspace violations, Brothers to the Rescue believes that these were acts of legitimate resistance against the government. In 1996, ignoring a final warning by Cuba, two Brothers to the Rescue planes were shot down by the Cuban Air Force, leading to international condemnation.

== Notes ==
See, for example, Granma International, December 13, 2005.
