= Barbara N. Young =

Miami art librarian

Barbara N. Young is an art librarian, curator, and former Art Services administrator for the Miami-Dade Public Library System (MDPLS). During her tenure, she oversaw the Artmobile service and the library's permanent art collection, organized adult programming, curated exhibitions throughout the library system, and co-founded The Vasari Project, an archive of Miami's art history from 1945 onward, with art critic, historian, and writer Helen L. Kohen. Young is known for her role in documenting, preserving, and supporting the art world of Miami.

== Education ==
Young received a bachelor's degree in art history from Florida State University and a master's degree in Library and Information Science from Drexel University.

== Career ==
=== Artmobile ===
Young began her career as an art librarian and curator in 1976, when the Miami-Dade Public Library System (MDPLS) hired her to initiate the Artmobile Service. The Artmobile was a 30-foot long van, "museum on wheels" that serviced Miami-Dade County and operated until 1992. The Artmobile's exterior design, a zebra pattern with large tropical flowers, was painted by Lowell Blair Nesbitt, in 1976 and again in July 1987, to reflect South Florida's local environment. The van was donated to MDPLS by the Southeast Banking Corporation. Annually, it carried exhibitions of original art works, as well as a variety of library materials, throughout the community to schools, parks, and shopping centers. The artworks on display included pieces by many South Florida artists, as well as artists such as Robert Blackburn, Jeanne-Claude and Christo, Raymond Saunders, Alexander Calder, Jim Dine, Jasper Johns, and Robert Rauschenburg. As the Artmobile Librarian, Young coordinated exhibitions that toured the county for nearly two decades, handled publicity, special programs, and the selection of artwork.

=== MDPLS Permanent art collection ===
Art librarian Margarita Cano initiated MDPLS's permanent collection of original artworks and worked closely with local artists and collectors to acquire works that were installed throughout the library system. She and Young developed a close relationship and Young continued Cano's acquisition and exhibition efforts. Currently, MDPLS's Art Services and Exhibitions Division maintains a permanent art collection that includes works on paper, photographs, paintings, artists' books, and small sculptures, with a focus on African American, Latino, and Miami artists. The permanent collection, along with the Artmobile program, were established in the 1970s to address the need for more exhibition venues for artists, particularly those that highlighted the work of local, African-American, and Latino/Latin American artists, and greater community exposure to the arts and libraries in Miami-Dade County.

=== Exhibitions and special projects ===
After working with the Artmobile, Young contributed to the growth of the permanent collection and curated exhibitions throughout MDPLS's branches and neighborhood facilities. Over the years, she worked closely with artists, including Carlos Alfonzo, Willie Birch, Kabuya Pamela Bowens, Elizabeth Catlett, Fernando Garcia, Sam Gilliam, Mildred Howard, Raymond Saunders, Edward Ruscha, and Howard Bingham, Muhammad Ali's best friend and photographer. Young also coordinated system-wide adult programming with authors, musicians, dancers, and business presenters.

In February 1982, Margarita Cano and Barbara Young first met with Christo and Jeanne-Claude. In March, Young oversaw a promotional exhibition of drawings from Jeanne-Claude and Christo's various projects for the Artmobile. In June of that year, Cano and Young organized Surrounded Islands, an exhibition of preliminary drawings with a 40-foot-long model of the project at the former Main Library branch in Bayfront Park in Downtown Miami. Later, Library staff works with Christo's engineers to test swaths of the specialized pink fabric from three different vendors on the roof of the library building to determine strength, durability, and color stability for the project. Young also worked with the installation crew for the project and donated her shirt, hat, fabric, and other memorabilia to the Vasari Project.

Throughout her tenure as Art Services administrator, Young was involved in organizing theme shows inviting artists to engage with thoughts and literary concepts such as boats, shoes, library cards, dogs, food, and the alphabet. Some of that work was donated to the Library's permanent art collection afterwards.

In the 1980s, Young coordinated the fundraising and publishing for Romer's Miami, a book of historical black and white photographs by Miami photographer Gleason Romer from the library's special collections. In the late 1980s, she coordinated fundraising and the conservation of the library's original Raggedy Ann and Andy dolls given to the library by Myrtle Gruelle, wife of the illustrator Johnny Gruelle, in 1951. Young was the library liaison with Miami-Dade Art in Public Places for Ed Ruscha Rotunda and lunette paintings at the Main Library branch.

The library hosted a series of historical art and business exhibitions in 1990 under the title, Miami Thriving in Change 1940 - 1990. Young oversaw the creation of a timeline about the arts and the library that was published to complement these exhibitions.

In 1998, Young co-curated Touched by Aids with Cano and Kohen. The exhibition, organized by the Estate Project for the Artist with AIDS, opened at Miami-Dade Community College's Centre Gallery, showcased the work of thirteen Miami-based artists who had died of AIDS, including Carlos Alonzo, Craig Coleman, Fernando Garcia, and Juan Gonzalez.

=== Purvis Young ===
Young and Cano were early supporters of the artist and library user Purvis Young. They provided him with art supplies and books and coordinated the commission of his mural Everday Life at the Culmer Overtown branch. They also introduced Purvis Young to local art scholars, collectors, and gallerists.

=== The Vasari Project ===
The Vasari Project, a library collection dedicated to documenting, collecting, and preserving Miami-Dade County's art history from 1945 to the present, was conceived by Young and art historian and critic Helen L. Kohen in 2000. The Vasari Project, housed at the Main branch of the MDPLS, is named for Giorgio Vasari, Renaissance painter, architect, art historian, and biographer, who is best known for his work Lives of the Most Excellent Painters, Sculptors, and Architects.

The Vasari Project is a living archive that collects documentation, consisting primarily of printed matter and ephemeral materials that grows through contributions from artists, art professionals, exhibition spaces, galleries, institutions and private donors. It serves as a resource for ongoing research, scholarship, publications, artists' projects, exhibitions and events.

After twenty-nine years, Young retired from MDPLS in 2005.

== Curatorial career and exhibitions ==
Young continues to curate exhibitions with artists, galleries, and collectors from South Florida and other locales.

She curated The Artful Book 2021, an exhibition of artist-made books by South Florida artists at the Museum of Arts and Sciences Daytona Beach. The Artful Book 2021 was an expanded version of The Artful Book 2019, presented in conjunction with the Miami International Book Fair and installed at LnS Gallery in Miami in 2019. The participating artists included Mario Bencomo, Pedro Hernandez, Barbara Neijna, Lydia Rubio, Donna Ruff, Cesar Trasobares, and Purvis Young.

== Professional affiliations and recognition ==
In 2012, Young was recognized at the fundraising event Miami Moments 2012, along with Cano and Kohen, for being passionately devoted to the development of the cultural life of Miami for more than forty years.

Young is a member of the Mid-Atlantic Chapter of the Art Libraries Society of North America (ARLIS/NA), an organization devoted to fostering excellence in art and design librarianship.

== Personal life ==
Young met sculptor Robert Huff through MDPLS. Young and Huff married for thirty-two years until his passing in 2014.

Young continues to honor Huff's memory and legacy by coordinating one-person exhibitions of Huff's work including Robert Huff: 47 Years co-curated by Carol Jazzar at the Miami-Dade College Museum of Art and Design (MOAD) in 2015 and Robert Huff: Retrospective at the Museum of Art - Deland in 2018. She's also facilitated Huff's inclusion in group exhibitions, The Flag Project: Rainbow City, curated by william cordova and You Are Here at Dimensions Variable in 2023.

In 2018, Young participated in the publishing with Letter16 Press of Robert Huff: Cross Section, consisting of drawings, paintings, sculpture, and public artwork by Huff, with an essay by Beth Dunlop, Pulitzer-nominated architecture critic for The Miami Herald. The book was conceived before Huff's passing by Young and Huff, along with Carol Jazzar, Huff's art dealer, and Kohen.
