= Margarita Cano =

Margarita Cano may refer to:

- Margarita Cano (artist) (born 1932), Cuban-American artist
- Margarita Cano (politician) (born 1953), Mexican politician
