= Margarita Cano (artist) =

Cuban-American artist and librarian

- Born: February 27, 1932; Havana, Cuba
- Died: March 19, 2024 (aged 92); Miami, Florida
- Other name: Margarita Fernandez Cano
- Education: University of Havana
- Occupations: Artist, curator, librarian
- Years active: 1950s - 2024
- Notable work: Miami Tumble, The Miami Generation, Surrounded Islands, The Miami Book Fair

Margarita Cano was a Cuban-American artist, curator, scholar, former liaison of the Miami-Dade Public Library System and Center for the Fine Arts, and former Head of Community Relations for the Miami-Dade Public Library System. She was a significant contributor to the development of the Latin American art market of South Florida as a leading figure in the City of Miami and Miami-Dade County public library systems. Cano is responsible for launching the permanent art collection of the Miami-Dade County Library System as well as spearheading several milestone Miami art and literary events of the 1980s, such as Surrounded Islands, The Miami Generation exhibition, and the Miami Book Fair.

Cano died in Miami, Florida, on March 19, 2024, at the age of 92.

== Background and early life in Cuba ==
Margarita Victoria Fernandez y Villa Urrutia was born in Havana, Cuba on February 27, 1932, to Margarita Villa Urrutia Suarez and Rafael Antonio Maria Fernandez Ruenes. She was the second of their two children, following her brother Rafael, who was born five years previously. Her father was an architect and held master's degrees in physics and chemistry. He became a notable figure in Cuba for designing the landmark Bacardi Building, which in 1930 became Havana's first Art Deco building. Her mother was a housewife from a family of Basque descent that had migrated to the Canary Islands before settling in Cuba.

Her upbringing with her brother Rafael in the Fernandez household within el Vedado included an frequently eclectic roster of notable visitors that included pianists, archeologists, and artists such as Wifredo Lam, who was an early supporter of her own art career. Margarita and her brother attended the Ruston Academy for their education, taking classes in both English and Spanish and also learning French. Cano graduated in 1949 and subsequently enrolled in the University of Havana, earning her doctorate in physics and chemistry in 1953. That same year, at the age of 21, Cano worked on the Cuban television program “Las Toallas Antex,” a trivia game show, as a panelist who was tested by answering audience questions. Her brother, Rafael Fernandez, later became the Chief Curator of Prints and Drawings at the Clark Art Institute in Williams College of Williamstown, Massachusetts.

In the 1950s she would frequently visit Miami, where her brother was then residing while securing a second law degree from the University of Miami. In that period Miami was a mid-sized city with more affordable commodities than the more metropolitan Havana. She would also frequently visit New York City and Washington, D.C., in her youth before the Cuban Revolution.

Cano's mother died suddenly of a pulmonary embolism when Cano was in her twenties and employed in an industrial chemical lab in Havana. Following her mother's death, a close relative was appointed by the Castro government as director of the National Library and Margarita became her personal assistant. During this period the National Library was a central element of Castro's campaign to increase literacy in rural areas. While working in the library, Cano also returned to the University of Havana to study library science, after which she was tasked with reorganizing the National Library’s serial publications department. As Castro became more personally involved in the Library's operations, the government also began banning and censoring books and publications that countered the government's positions, such as Nineteen Eighty-Four, Animal Farm, The Anatomy of Revolution, as well as capitalist publications such as Life, Time, and The New York Times. During this stage of censorship, Cano left her post at the Havana National Museum for a position in the Napoleonic Museum, led by Julio Lobo.

She married Pablo Benigno Cano Diago, an agricultural engineer, in 1956. He was also active as a musician and played electric guitar and bass alongside high-profile figures visiting Havana including Liberace, Maurice Chevalier, Roberta Flack, Sarah Vaughan, as well as jazz musicians. In 1959 the Cano's had her first child, her daughter Isabel. In 1960, Cano earned her master's degree in library science from the University of Havana. Their second child, Pablo, was born in 1961.

== Life in the United States ==
=== 1960s and 1970s ===
On October 17, 1962, the Cano family was able to secure safe passage out of Cuba and arrived in Miami where they joined the growing Cuban exile community there. The following year Cano began working at the City of Miami Public Library System. Over the next thirty years she would play a public role in elevating the Library System's profile and role in the community, particularly in the arts. In 1970 Cano started working at the newly created Art Services Department, where she would organize lectures and art exhibitions, throughout the library system. These activities were designed to use the Public Library System to help meet the growing needs of the South Florida art community and supplant the lack of art institutions, particularly for minority communities such as Latin American and African American art markets.

Among her significant contributions to the Library System, Cano launched the system's permanent art collection of original prints and art works that were displayed throughout the system's libraries. It would grow to over 7,000 works by more than 2,000 artists, spanning from local Miami artists to internationally recognized artists such as Andy Warhol, Pablo Picasso, Georges Rouault, Ed Ruscha, Lowell Nesbitt, and Juan González.

In 1971, the City of Miami transferred the Library management responsibility to the Dade-County Public Library System, merging the institutions. Through the 1970s, Cano organized the Art Services Department as it continued to grow. During this period she initiated "The Art Mobile,” a mobile art gallery exhibition space sponsored with the support of Southeast Banks. The success of the program caused the Artmobile concept to become a model for other library systems in the United States. Pop artist Lowell Nesbitt was commissioned to paint the exterior of the Art Mobile, for which he created an original design featuring tropical flowers and black zebra stripes. After nearly two decades, the Art Mobile was ultimately retired in 1992 following Hurricane Andrew.

In April 1976, Cano wrote the article “Bridging the Art Gap: The Role of the Public Library” Which was published in the ARLIS/NA Newsletter (now the Journal of the Art Libraries Society of North America). The following year Cano organized the presentation of the first exhibition of CINTAS Fellows in 1977.

=== 1980s to post-retirement ===
Cano was also a key figure in organizing several of the major art events in Miami of the 1980s that helped the region emerge as a national, and later international, arts hub that decade. In 1981 Cano initiated and organized the Downtown Art Wave ‘81 Miami Tumble to generate public interest and awareness for the then-upcoming Metro Dade Cultural Center, for which Cano was an art staff member. The performance art event featured over 600 giant domino blocks designed by various artists, including Barbara Young, Lowell Nesbit, the studio of Andy Warhol, Pedro Hernandez, Miami Dade Public School students, and several local Miami artists. As the first street art project in Miami, large artwork "dominoes" were then aligned and tumbled by then-Miami Mayor Maurice Ferré along Flagler Street from Biscayne Blvd to the Courthouse, for which traffic was closed. Conceptually, the performance illustrated the Domino Effect. At the conclusion of the event, the domino block artworks were then auctioned off on the steps of the courthouse with 80% of the proceeds going to the artists and the remaining 20% raised funds for the new art center. The Miami Tumble was sponsored by the Miami-Dade Public Library System, the new Center for the Fine Arts, the Downtown Miami Business Association, and the History Museum.

In 1983 Cano curated the high-profile Christo and Jeanne Claude exhibition Surrounded Islands through the Miami Public Library. The exhibition marked the end of the installation period of the Biscayne Bay environmental work and featured drawing of the concept as well as the renowned pink fabric used, which would be ultimately donated to the Library System's Vasari Project archives that Cano co-founded. Cano was also involved in the development of the main art project itself and helped the artists test the specialized fabric, custom made in Germany and Japan, on the library roof with the artists and librarian Barbara Young to determine its durability and if it would fade before selecting it for use in the two-year installation. The main exhibition was held in the former Bayfront Park library location in Downtown Miami. Thirty five years later, the project was the focus of the 2018 exhibition and film Christo and Jean-Claude: Surrounded Islands, Biscayne Bay, Greater Miami, Florida, 1980–83, A Documentary Exhibition in the Perez Art Museum Miami, for which Christo returned to attend the opening and give a lecture in support of the retrospective.

That same year, Cano also spearheaded the landmark The Miami Generation exhibition of 1983, among Miami's most significant and high-profile art events of the 1980s. The show would be the first major art exhibition dedicated to showcasing the first generation of Cuban artists who had been born in Cuba but educated outside of Cuba, and was becoming increasingly visible in shaping the growing Cuban art market in exile, particularly in South Florida. It was Cano who first proposed the idea for the exhibition and would then serve as Project Director of the Exhibition's Program Committee. The exhibition was curated by Giulio V. Blanc and feature nine prominent emerging Cuban artist: Juan González, Emilio Falero, Humberto Calzada, Cesar Trasobares, Maria Brito, Fernando García, Carlos Macia, Mario Bencomo, and Pablo Cano, Margarita's son. The exhibition's profile ultimately grew to become a traveling exhibition, showing at Miami's Cuban Museum of Arts and Culture in Miami, the Balch Institute for Ethnic Studies in Philadelphia, and Meridian International Center’s Meridian House in Washington, D.C. In 2014, a retrospective exhibition was held in the Museum of Art Fort Lauderdale called The Miami Generation Revisited to recognize and assess the legacy of the original exhibition three decades later and the impact of that group of artists, several of whom had succumbed to the AIDS crisis that had unfolded through the 1980s and 1990s.

In 1984, Cano helped organize and launch The Miami Book Fair with area book sellers and Miami Dade College. Since its launch, The Miami Book Fair International has become the most comprehensively programmed book fair in the United States and attracts more than 200 national and international exhibitors, 500 authors, and over 200,000 attendees.

In 1990, Cano curated the exhibition Miami Thriving in Change: Showcasing 50 years of Miami's Cultural Growth. Cano then retired from the Miami Dade Public Library System in 1992, after which she recommitted herself to her art career. She also remained active in the community through the arts and her roles in foundation boards, including the Oscar B. Cinta's Foundation Board and the Cuban Museum of Arts and Culture Board.

In 1998, Cano co-curated the exhibition Touched by Aids with Barbara N. Young and Helen L. Kohen.

In 2001, Cano co-founded the Miami-Dade Public Library System's Vasari Project with Kohen and Young to archive the development of visual arts in the area from 1945 to the present.

In 2007, Cano's film Once Upon an Island, part of her multimedia exhibition of the same name, received a special screening at the 2nd Annual Women's International Film Festival in Miami. The film was edited by Jorge Hernandez and featured music by JC Espinosa.

== Art career ==
In addition to her career as a curator, Cano painted since the age of five in Cuba and was self-taught. Her style often incorporated Byzantine-inspired religious imagery, as well as elements from whimsical medieval fairy tales and illuminated manuscripts. Cano often produced detailed mixed media miniature works that range from icon-like art of saints to storybooks and painted tiles. Her early works included landscapes of Cuba and works in ochre that were covered by the University of Havana's student design magazine, Espacio. Cano's art often incorporated storytelling and alluded to her upbringing in Cuba. Her other influences include the work of Lucas Cranach, Hieronymus Bosch, Jackson Pollock, Mark Rothko, Clyfford Still and American folk art portraits.

While still in Cuba, Cano became close to other Cuban artists that would become significant contributors to the establishment and development of Cuban and Latin American art in South Florida, such as Miguel Jorge and Gabriel Sorzano. Among her earliest supporters was Cuban Vanguardia artist Wifredo Lam.

In Miami, while working for the Miami-Dade Public Library System and developing its arts program, Cano was also a contributor and featured artist in several early Cuban and Latin American art venues in South Florida, such as Bacardi Gallery and Permuy Gallery.

Throughout her career, her art has been exhibited in New York, North Carolina, Puerto Rico, and throughout South Florida. Cano's art is held in the permanent collection of the Lowe Art Museum, Miami-Dade Public Library of Downtown Miami, and the NSU Art Museum in Fort Lauderdale FL.

== Select art exhibitions ==
- 1970 — 6th Annual Piedmont Graphics Exhibition, Mint Museum, Charlot, NC
- 1970 — Bacardi Art Gallery, Miami FL
- 1973-75 — Permuy Gallery, Coral Gables FL
- 1980 — Forma Gallery, Coral Gables FL
- 1986 — Viota Gallery, San Juan Puerto Rico
- 1993 — Gallery of the Eccentric, Coral Gables FL
- 1998 — Cultural Resource Center, Miami FL
- 2002 — South Florida Art Center, Miami Beach FL
- 2005 — Books & Books, Coral Gables FL
- 2005 — Connors Rosato Gallery, NY
- 2006 — Oñate Gallery, Miami FL }
- 2007 — Centre Gallery, Miami FL
- 2008 — Viota Gallery, San Juan Puerto Rico
- 2013 — Zadoc Gallery, Miami FL
- 2012 — Saladrigas Gallery, Belen Jesuit Preparatory School, Miami FL
- 2014 — Miami Dade College Downtown Campus, Miami FL
- 2015 — Miami Dade Public Library Retrospective
- 2017 — FAU University Gallery, Boca Raton FL
- 2019 — LnS Gallery, Miami FL
- 2019 — Frost Art Museum FIU, Miami FL
- 2021 — Colonial Florida Cultural Heritage Center, Miami FL
- 2022 — Daytona Art Museum, Daytona FL
- 2022 — NSU Art Museum, Fort Lauderdale FL
- 2022-2023 — The BluPrnt, Bridge Red Studios, North Miami
- 2023 — Chapel of La Merced, Corpus Christi Church, Allapatah FL

== Legacy and recognitions ==
In 1992, the Miami-Dade County School Board recognized Margarita Cano for being instrumental in the development of the Art Mobile.

In 2009, Cano received the Oscar B. Cintas Foundation Lifetime Achievement Award.

In 2012, Cano was honored in the fundraising event Miami Moments 2012 as one of "The Library’s Three Graces in the Arts" along with Barbara Young and Helen Kohen for co-founding the Vasari Project to archive the history of visual art in Miami-Dade County.

In 2018, Cano was awarded the Helen Kohen Miami Legends Award.

In 2019, the City of North Miami Florida passed a Proclamation in declaring September 24, 2019 “Margarita Cano Day” in recognition of her career and impact.

From November 2021 to February 2022, the NSU Art Museum honored Cano with a retrospective exhibition of her art titled Margarita Cano: 90 Years, marking her 90th birthday.

Cano was among the artists included in The BluPrnt exhibition highlighting a century of art in Miami. Curated by Robert Chambers and hosted by Bridge Red Studios, the exhibition was held from November 20, 2022 — February 12, 2023, a period that notably included Miami Art Week 2022 and marked the 20th anniversary of Art Basel Miami. This heightened visibility resulted in coverage of the exhibition by The New York Times, which listed it as a Miami Art Week Pick.

Cano was honored on her 91st birthday on February 27, 2023, with an exhibition of her work titled Margarita Cano: A Celebration in the Chapel of La Merced, Corpus Christi Church, curated by Carol Damien.

In September 2024, six months after her death, Cano was accepted into permanent collection of the Alvin Sherman Library, one of the largest libraries in the state of Florida, as part of the Marta Permuy Legacy Collection. A piece from her Virgen de la Caridad series was accepted into library’s permanent collection, which also features works by Salvador Dalí, Dale Chihuly, Peter Max, and Pedro Hernandez. The piece was subsequently unveiled with an exhibition at the library in October 2024 to coincide Hispanic Heritage Month. The donation marked the first inclusion of Cano's art into a public collection since her death.

In addition to her recognitions, Cano was also interviewed by researchers regarding her contributions and recollections across a range of topics including: The Cuban Revolution, the Cuban exile experience, the development of the Miami-Dade County Public Library System's art programs, and the development of Cuban and Latin American art in South Florida. Her interviews have been included on the Smithsonian Archives of American Art as well as the book Ninety Miles and a Lifetime Away: Memories of Early Cuban Exiles.

== Personal life and family ==
Margarita Cano was married to agricultural engineer and President of Climax recording studio Pablo Benigno Cano Diago (1929-2014). They were married in 1956 and had two children: a daughter, Isabel, and the artist Pablo Cano.

Her father was the noted Cuban intellectual and scholar Rafael Antonio Maria Fernandez Ruenes. Fernandez Ruenes was a polymath who, as an architect, designed the Bacardi Building, Havana's first Art Deco building. Fernandez Ruenes was also an engineer, a doctor in physics and chemistry, and an author. Fernandez Ruenes was also a professor of the University of Indiana and Purdue University and later in his career served for 14 years as a handwriting expert for the Metro Police Crime Laboratory. He had previously served as vice president and co-founder of the American Society of Examiners of Questioned Documents, founded in 1942.

Her brother, Rafael Fernandez, was the Chief Curator of Prints and Drawings at the Clark Art Institute in Williams College of Williamstown, Massachusetts.

== See also ==
- Pablo Cano
- Miami-Dade Public Library System
- Cuban art
- Cubans in Miami
