= Islets in Pink Polypropylene =

Studio album by Anthony Manning
- Released: 1 December 1994
- Genre: Electronic; experimental; IDM
- Length: 37:17
- Label: Irdial Discs
- Producer: Anthony Manning

Anthony Manning chronology
Islets in Pink Polypropylene (1994)	Chromium Nebulae (1996)

Islets in Pink Polypropylene is the debut studio album by English visual artist and experimental composer Anthony Manning, released on 1 December 1994 on Irdial Discs. It is best known for the intense and unorthodox method of music sequencing that resulted in the album's creation, as well as its unique sound achieved by its microtonal tuning system.

== Background and composition ==
Islets in Pink Polypropylene was created entirely on a Roland R-8, despite its incapability of being a synthesiser, through an unorthodox and complex process that according to Manning took "many weeks per piece". While in ownership of the drum machine, he took advantage of its pitch-shifting values by mapping them out in multiples of 400, listening to sounds from a PCM sound card that would later become primary instruments in the album's compositions, and consequently developing a microtonal tuning system that gave the album its unique tone. He compared this process to stopmotion animation: "your days are filled with painfully tiny incremental changes that seem to be getting nowhere. Then, slowly, a shape, narrative, starts to appear. Then, all of a sudden, somehow, it's done."

Manning later began to note the structure of his pieces down on graph paper, drawing each track out using the Y axis for pitch and the X axis for time, and sequencing them with the R-8, similar to how one would sequence sounds within a spectrogram. After the record was finished, Manning claims "that [he] finally got a chance to sleep again"; the making of the record resulted in him experiencing severe sleep deprivation.

=== Title origin ===
The name of the album is a direct reference to environmental artists Christo and Jeanne-Claude's 1983 artwork Surrounded Islands, which indeed involved islets surrounded in floating sheets of pink polypropylene fabric. Manning "happened to read a magazine article about Christo's "Surrounded Islands" installation [...] There was something about a particular cluster of words within a random sentence that seemed pleasing and somehow appropriate. "Islets in Pink Polypropylene" seemed to make as much sense as anything else."

== Critical reception ==
Professional ratings
Review scores
Source	Rating
AllMusic	2.5/5 stars

Islets in Pink Polypropylene received positive reception upon release. The Wire abstractly praised the album, calling it "a liquidy headbox of aural shapes, whose forms hardly change yet seem to encompass infinite viscosity within them, like rainbow pools of oil on water." Later, upon being reissued on 12 May 2016, it also received more positive reception. Record distributor Boomkat commented that "it is a friendly, memorably involving listen; you might just have to work around its more autistic elements to find a way in". John Twells, writing for Fact, praised the album, stating that "it's refreshing to hear an all-electronic album that sounds so organic yet so totally alien."

In 2017, Islets in Pink Polypropylene ranked at number 41 on Pitchfork's list of "The 50 Best IDM Albums of All Time". Site critic Andrew Nosnitsky wrote that the album embodied the "find-a-machine-and-freak-it ethos" of 1990s IDM music, concluding that "for Manning, it was as if rhythm and melody had never been distinct elements to begin with, and his fusion of the two set an early precedent for the digital signal processing abuse that would come to define IDM at the turn of the century".

== Track listing ==
No.	Title	Length
1.	"Untitled"	8:38
2.	"Untitled"	9:04
3.	"Untitled"	4:40
4.	"Untitled"	5:46
5.	"Untitled"	9:09
Total length:		37:17

== Personnel ==
- Anthony Manning – production, arrangements
