= Strom Thurmond Federal Building and United States Courthouse =

Government building in Columbia, South Carolina

- U.S. National Register of Historic Places
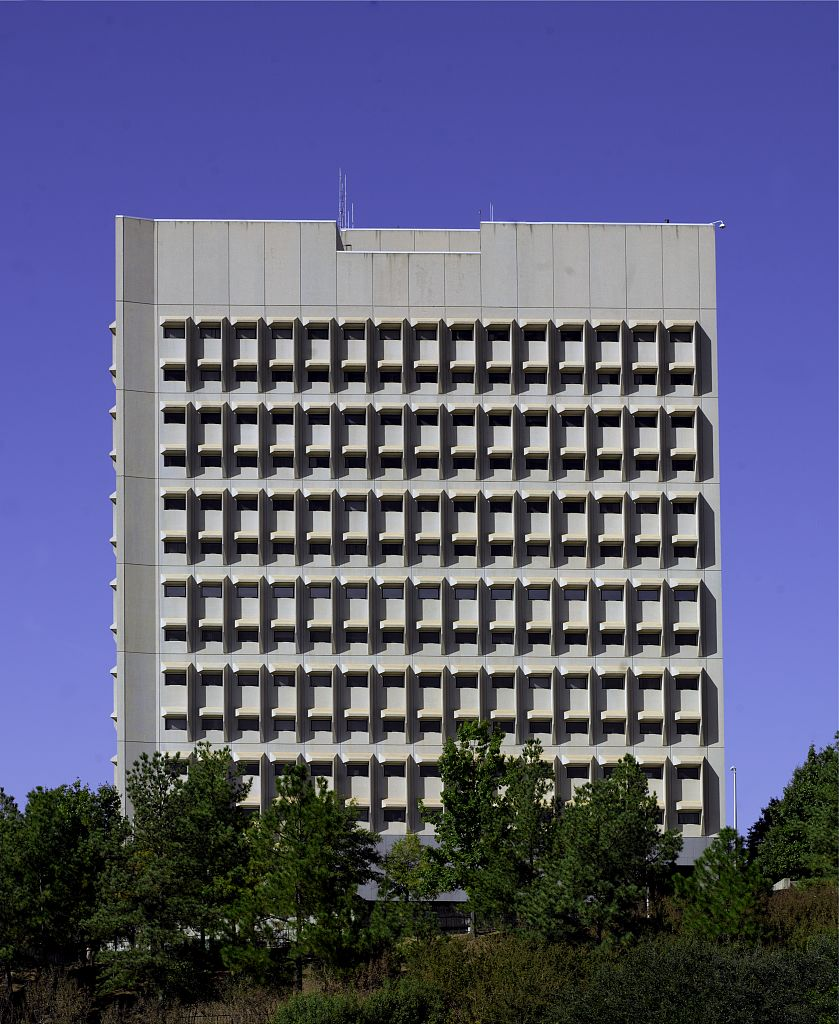
- Strom Thurmond Federal Building

- Location within South Carolina Location within the United States
- Location: 1835-1845 Assembly Street, Columbia, South Carolina
- Coordinates: 34°00′33″N 81°02′25″W
- Built: 1975–1979
- Architect: Marcel Breuer
- Architectural style: Brutalist
- NRHP reference No.: 14000599
- Added to NRHP: September 10, 2014

The Strom Thurmond Federal Building and United States Courthouse is a United States federal building at 1835-1845 Assembly Street in Columbia, South Carolina. Designed by Marcel Breuer and completed in 1979, it served for twenty-five years as a courthouse of the United States District Court for the District of South Carolina. It is named for long-time Senator Strom Thurmond, and is listed on the National Register of Historic Places.

The building is a Brutalist building made of concrete, granite, and glass. Prominent features include a monolithic office tower paired with long, low courthouse; repetitive recessed windows with protruding hoods; and a landscaped plaza.

== History ==
The building was one of the last projects completed by the master architect Hungarian Marcel Breuer before his 1976 retirement. To complete the design of the new federal building and courthouse in Columbia, South Carolina, Breuer collaborated with his architectural partner Herbert Beckhard. James C. Hemphill, Jr., an architect from Charlotte, North Carolina, also contributed to the design. In 1975, officials decided to name the still-incomplete complex to honor Senator and former Governor Strom Thurmond, who had represented South Carolina in the United States Senate since 1954. The complex was completed in 1979 at a cost of $23.5 million. Early tenants included the U.S. Courts, U.S. Department of Agriculture, U.S. Geological Survey, and the Federal Bureau of Investigation. In 2003, the federal courts moved to a new location, and the U.S. General Services Administration initiated a project to explore reuse of the vacated space.

=== Significant events ===
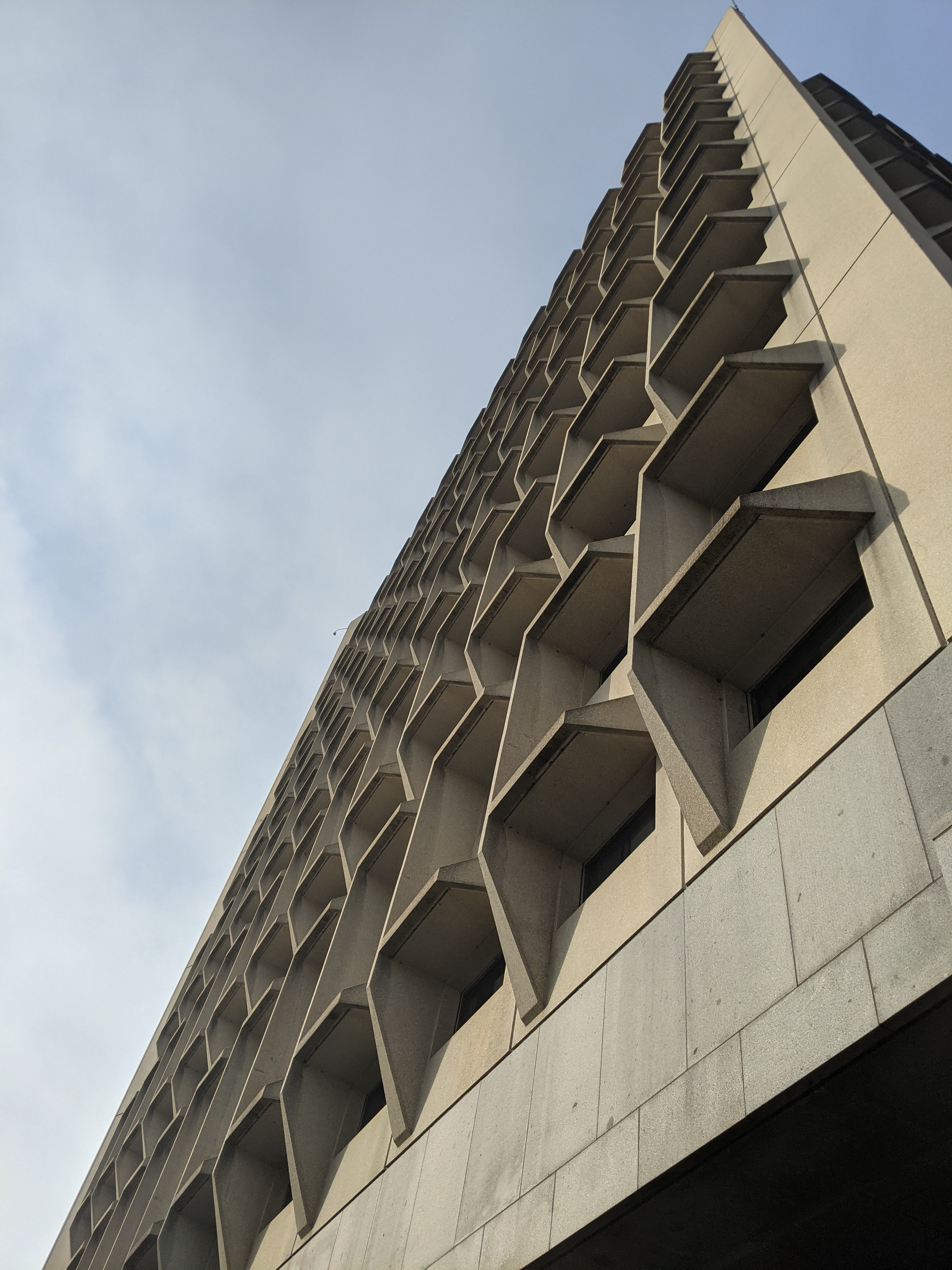
The Strom Thurmond Federal Building in Columbia, S.C., features angular concrete brise soleils, which shield the windows from sunlight.

- 1975: Building dedicated to honor U.S. Senator Strom Thurmond
- 1975-1979: Building constructed
- 1979: First tenants occupy building
- 2003: Federal courts vacate complex

== Architecture ==
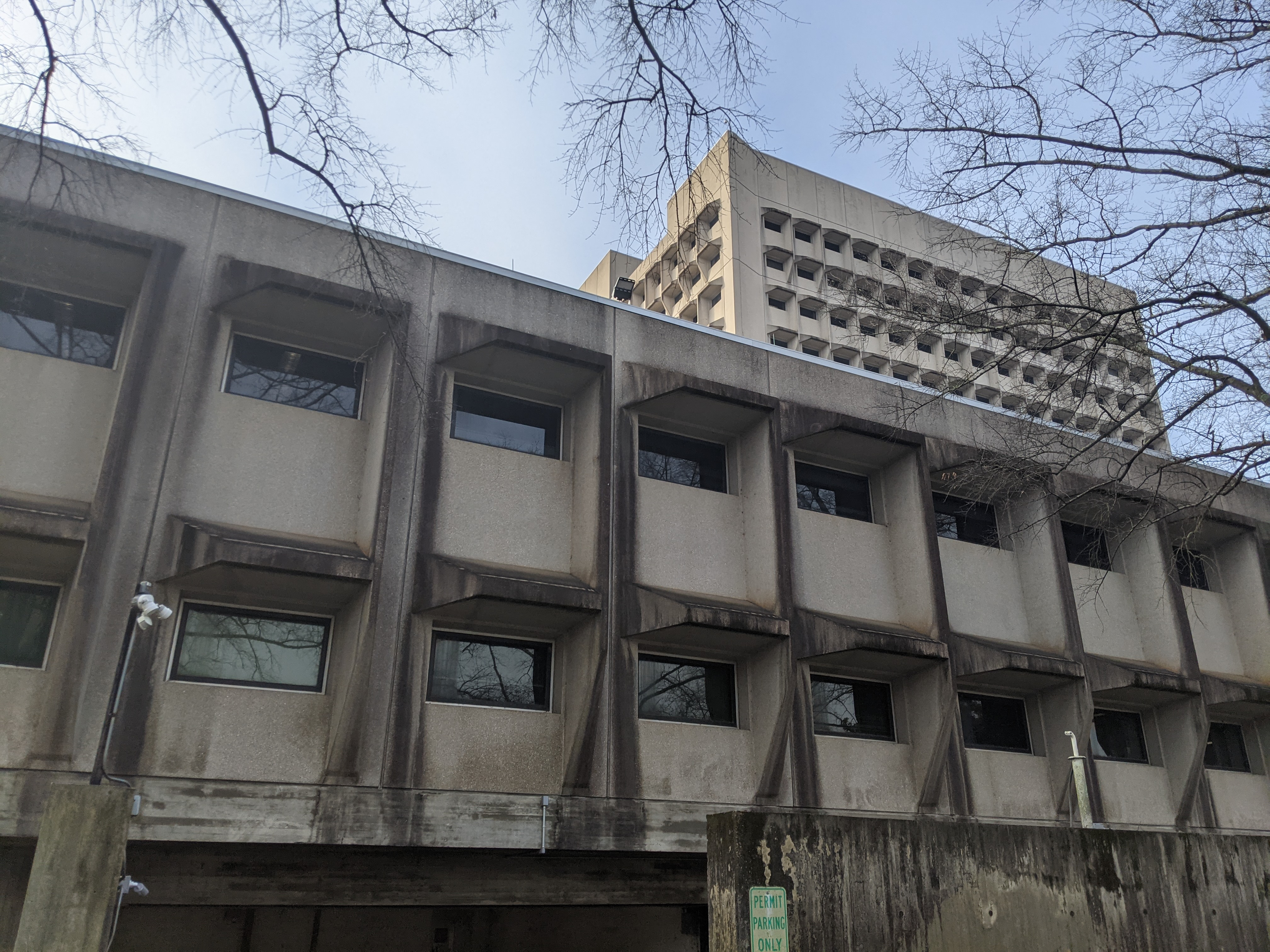
The Strom Thurmond Federal Complex in Columbia, South Carolina. The architect Marcel Breuer designed the U.S. Courthouse (foreground) and Federal Building (background).

The building is a stark but sophisticated example of the Brutalist style of architecture. It exhibits many character-defining features of the style, including rough, exposed exterior concrete walls, deeply recessed windows, and a weighty massiveness. Combining a tall office tower with a long, low courthouse and landscaped plaza, the complex's form is similar to that of many Modern-era federal buildings. The building occupies a parcel of land bounded by Laurel, Assembly, Richland, and Park streets in downtown Columbia. The courthouse is accessed through an open courtyard from Assembly Street. The facility contains 500,000 square feet (46,000 m^{2}) of space.

The sixteen-story office tower has a monolithic presence. Unlike elaborate federal buildings from earlier eras, the tower is stark and unadorned, with its dominant design being repetitive windows with peaked hoods called brise soleils. The hoods serve to minimize direct sunlight, thus reducing the interior temperature during warm South Carolina summers. Like many Modern buildings, the first level is recessed beneath an arcade supported by square columns. The building has a steel frame and is clad in pre-cast concrete panels and dark gray cold spring natural granite. Breuer and Beckhard developed a sophisticated design that resulted in a well-insulated and energy-conscious building. In addition to successfully completing the challenging design, the architects incorporated many security features for both the courts and other tenants. A tunnel connects the office tower to the three-story courthouse building. Breuer unified the complex by repeating the same window form on the courthouse. Like the office tower, the main facade has a recessed first story with a glass street-front arcade.

The interiors of both the office tower and the courthouse contain high-quality materials that evoke the Modern spirit of the complex. Glazed, polished bricks cover portions of the floors and interior walls. Concrete coffered ceilings create pattern and texture in the public spaces. Squares and cubes are used as a design element throughout both buildings; granite cubes form the informational directories, water fountains, seating areas, and stairwells. These components are found in the office tower lobby, along with colossal concrete columns that provide monumentality to the interior. Within the courthouse, the four courtrooms are dignified spaces. Wall paneling consists of thin vertical hardwood strips, while jury boxes and judges' benches are built from thin horizontal strips. The plaza of the complex is particularly emblematic of Breuer's work. He understood the importance of creating formal yet inviting outdoor spaces executed at a human scale. The primary materials that Breuer used are warm gray granite and tan concrete, which is typical in Brutalist architecture. He designed a reflecting pool in the sunken courtyard, with grass panels, shrubs, and trees added to soften hardscape features.

Two artists—Barbara Neijna and Marla Mallett—were commissioned by GSA's Art in Architecture program to create works of art for the courthouse. Marla Mallett's large-scale textile work, E Pluribus Unum, was originally located in the lobby. It was later removed after being damaged by adverse environmental conditions. For the exterior courtyard, Florida-based artist Barbara Neijna created Right Turn on White, a large-scale aluminum sculpture painted white. The sculpture consists of a rectangle standing on its side, with the top edge peeled forward to create an arc, which adds another dimension to the work by casting shadows on the rectangular face.
