= Surrounded Islands =

Environmental artwork

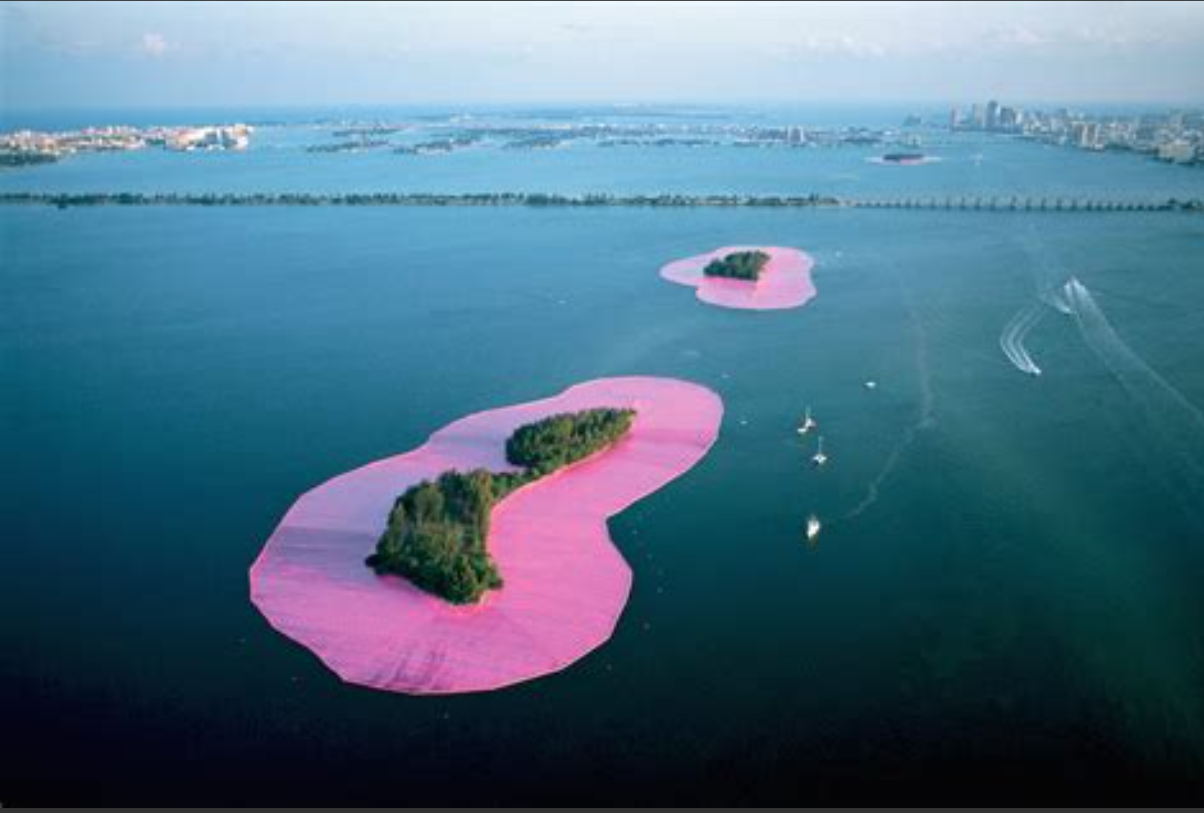
Surrounded Islands

Surrounded Islands, Biscayne Bay, Greater Miami, Florida, 1980–83 was a 1983 environmental artwork in which artists Christo and Jeanne-Claude surrounded an island archipelago in Miami with pink fabric.

== Planning ==
In 1980, while the couple dealt with bureaucratic gridlock on other projects, a Miami community art festival invited Christo and Jeanne-Claude to participate. While they declined on account of the Miami summer heat, they continued to explore the idea for a project in the city. Jeanne-Claude conceived the concept, which would surround 11 spoil islands with floating pink fabric in Miami's Biscayne Bay. They reviewed the engineering and environmental impacts for three years, learning about the bay's protected wildlife, commissioning studies of local wildlife, scoping logistics for anchoring the fabric to the islands, and experimenting with floating fabrics. The work also involved lobbying work to acquire public support, governmental approval, and permits. Their lawyers handled a federal lawsuit from a wildlife paramedic. The artists, as was their practice, restored environments to their original condition, but in Miami's case, they additionally cleaned 40 tons of waste during the project.

The project was supported by the Miami-Dade Public Library System, which aided in the planning and facilitated coordination with local officials to attain the approvals necessary to realize it. Margarita Cano, the Library System's Head of Community Relations, and librarian-curator Barbara Young were involved in the development of the project and helped the artists test the specialized fabric, custom made in Germany and Japan, on the roof of the former Bayfront Park library location in Downtown Miami to determine its durability and if it would fade before selecting it for use in the installation.

== Main project ==
The installation mounted for 11 days in May 1983. It was isolated, existing across 11 miles in the bay, and was mainly consumed through mass media, being best portrayed by aerial photography and over television. Surrounded Islands was the couple's most expensive work to date and their largest work by size in their lifetimes. The finished work played a strong role in developing the city's reputation as a place of culture.

The main exhibition for the project was held in June of 1983 at the Miami-Dade Public Library System's former Bayfront Park library location. The exhibition was curated by Margarita Cano and Barbara Young and detailed its process, concepts, and development while featuring the sketches and now-iconic pink cloth used, which were subsequently donated to the Library System's Vasari Project archives.

== In popular culture ==
English visual artist and experimental composer Anthony Manning named his 1994 album Islets in Pink Polypropylene after a description of the artwork in an article he read during the album's production.

The artwork is discussed, in contrast with William Lustig's 1980 slasher film Maniac, in David Antin's poem what it means to be avant-garde.

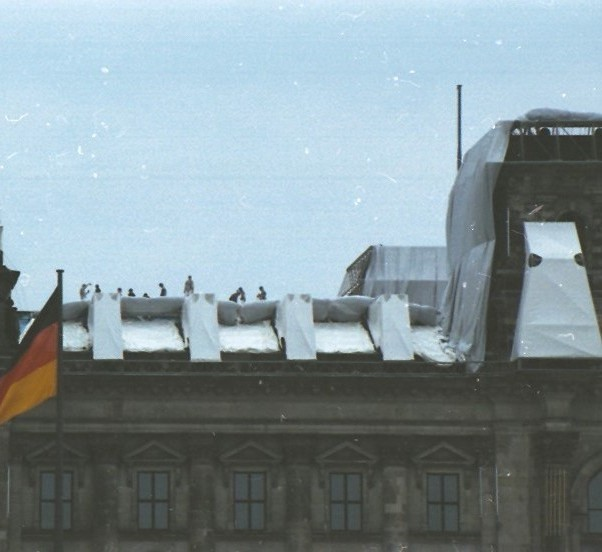
Reichstag installation by Christo

In 1987, filmmakers Albert Maysles, David Maysles, and Charlotte Zwerin released the documentary Islands. The film comments on how the artist duo wrapped a set of islands out of South Florida with 6.5 million square feet of pink textile. Islands also touches on iconic art installations such as the wrapping of the Pont Neuf in Paris and the Reichstag in Berlin.

== Notable art exhibitions ==
- Christo and Jeanne-Claude: Surrounded Islands, Biscayne Bay, Greater Miami, Florida, 1980-83 | A Documentation Exhibition, June 1983. Miami-Dade Public Library System, Bayfront Park branch.
- Christo and Jeanne-Claude: Surrounded Islands, Biscayne Bay, Greater Miami, Florida, 1980-83 | A Documentary Exhibition, 2019. Pérez Art Museum Miami
- Islands: Christo and Jeanne-Claude (screening), 2020. Pace Gallery, New York
- Christo Drawings: A Gift from the Maria Bechily and Scott Hodes Collection, 2022-2023. Pérez Art Museum Miami, United States
- Christo & Jeanne-Claude Surrounded Islands Documentation Exhibition, 2025-2027. NSU Art Museum Fort Lauderdale

== Bibliography ==
- Baal-Teshuva, Jacob (2001). Christo and Jeanne-Claude. Taschen. ISBN 978-3-8228-5996-4.
- Bennetts, Leslie (December 28, 1982). "Christo Will Wrap 11 Islands in Pink". The New York Times. ISSN 0362-4331.
- Chernow, Burt (2002). Christo and Jeanne-Claude: A Biography. Macmillan. ISBN 978-0-312-28074-1.
- "Compromise Proposed in Christo Island-Wrap". The New York Times. The Associated Press. March 20, 1983. ISSN 0362-4331.
- Earnest, Jarrett (December 11, 2018). "Boating Out to Christo's Pink-Wrapped Islands With the Artist, 35 Years Later". Vulture.
- Fineberg, Jonathan David (2004). "Surrounded Islands". Christo and Jeanne-Claude: On the Way to The Gates, Central Park, New York City. Yale University Press. pp. 40–41. ISBN 978-0-300-10405-9.
- Glueck, Grace (May 6, 1983). "Christo Vision Unfolds". The New York Times. ISSN 0362-4331.
- Nilson, Lisbet (January 1984). "'This Is My Water Lilies': Christo's Blossoms in the Bay". ARTnews.
- Sokol, Brett (October 26, 2018). "Pérez Art Museum Miami Recalls Pink Islands". The New York Times. ISSN 0362-4331.
- Valys, Phillip (September 28, 2018). "Christo on 'Surrounded Islands': 'The fear of failure was always there'". Sun Sentinel.
