= Mokha Laget =

Visual Artist

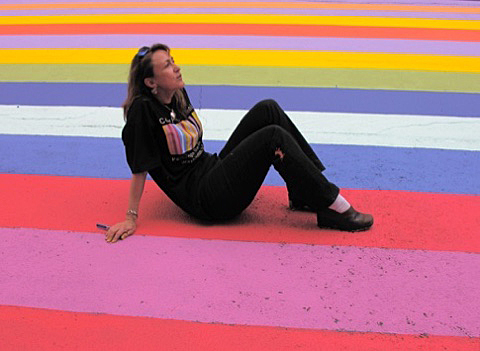
- Mokha Laget working on Gene Davis memorial street painting, 2007, 8th Street NW in Washington, D.C.
- Born: 1959 (age 66–67); Oran, Algeria
- Education: Corcoran School of the Arts and Design (BFA, 1982); Georgetown University School of Foreign Service (MA, 1992)
- Known for: Interdisciplinary visual arts
- Awards: Frederick Hammersley Fund for the Arts; Pollock-Krasner Foundation Grant; Artist Award, DC Commission on the Arts and Humanities
- Website: www.mokhalaget.com

Mokha Laget (born 1959) is a Franco-American visual artist, known for investigating spatial and auditory perceptual phenomena through geometric abstraction. Her work is influenced by music; psychology; architecture and modern art movements. Laget’s interdisciplinary practice spans painting, sculpture, printmaking, and soundscape video animation. Laget studied under the Washington Color School, noted for its dynamic use of color field painting and shaped canvas compositions. Laget's work was included in the "The Legacy of the Washington Color School," a group exhibition at the Oklahoma City Museum of Art, which highlighted second generation artists who actively contributed to the art landscape of Washington, DC, alongside the first-generation Washington Color School artists. Her paintings are typically composed of interlocking, brightly colored geometric forms, creating visual effects that explore shifting perspectives and light sources. Her work has been covered in publications, such as Art in America, The New Art Examiner, The Washington Post, and Hyperallergic.

== Early life and education ==
Born in Algeria to French parents, Laget spent her early years in North Africa. She later attended the Lycée Français de New York, where she completed her baccalaureate in philosophy, followed by studies at the University of Caen, where she received a degree in Anglo-American civilization and literature in 1981. Laget completed her formal art education at the Corcoran School of the Arts and Design in Washington, D.C., graduating in 1982. While at the Corcoran, she studied under Paul Reed and formed connections with other artists associated with the Washington Color School, including Gene Davis, whom Laget worked with as a studio assistant from 1980 to 1984. After his passing, Laget helped organize a memorial exhibition at the National Museum of American Art, now known as the Smithsonian American Art Museum; and in 1987 she led a public art project commemorating Davis with a 450 x 50-foot stripe street painting on 8th Street NW in Washington, D.C. She later revisited this work for the 2007 Color Field Remix festival, a commission from the DC Commission on the Arts and Humanities in collaboration with the Corcoran Gallery of Art and the Kreeger Museum.

In 1989, Laget joined Ruth Bolduan and Rockne Krebs to organize a landmark public protest in Washington, D.C., where Robert Mapplethorpe's photographs were projected onto the exterior facade of the Corcoran Gallery of Art, after the museum's controversial decision to cancel "Robert Mapplethorpe: the Perfect Moment," a retrospective, scheduled to open months after his death and coinciding with government censorship of the National Endowment of the Arts.

== Career ==
In the mid-1990s, Laget relocated to New Mexico, where she lives and works near Santa Fe. She has exhibited internationally since the 1980s. In 2022, a ten-year survey exhibition, Perceptualism, was held at the American University Museum's Katzen Art Center, highlighting her explorations in geometric abstraction. Art curator, Lucy Lippard, contributed to the exhibition catalogue, describing Laget as a "spatial trickster" whose work invites viewers to engage in an intellectual and perceptual exploration of form and color.

Laget was Curator-at-large (2017-2021) for the Museum of Geometric and Madi art in Dallas, TX. In 1990, she curated Metaphoric Structures: Science Symbols and Matter at Strathmore Hall Arts Center, a group exhibition including work by Carol Brown Goldberg, Kenneth Snelson, Andrea Way, and avant-garde composer John Cage. Laget’s interest in experimental music and interdisciplinary work, blends visual and sound media. Her "visual score" drawings and paintings have been adapted by composer, Bobby Ge, for live performances at the Chicago Symphony Civic Orchestra (2023) and the Copland House (2021). The “visual score” body of work has been presented in art institutions including Roman Capriccio (2023), American Academy in Rome; Étude Lumineuse (2023), Chatter at SITE Santa Fe; and Extempo (2024) at the New Mexico Museum of Art.

Laget's public art projects include a commission by Art in Embassies, an initiative of the U.S. Department of State, and a mural for the Taubman Museum of Art, "Intersecting Terrains," commissioned on the occasion of the museum's 75th anniversary.

Laget is a recipient of the Lorraine Bernstein Prize for Painting (1992) from the Corcoran School of Art; Pollock-Krasner Foundation Grant (2019); and the Frederick Hammersley Fund for the Arts (2024). In 2002, she was inducted as a Sociétaire at the Salon d’Automne in Paris and became a regular exhibitor at the Salon des Réalités Nouvelles, connecting her work with art movements in European abstraction. Laget has received Artists-in-Residence awards from New Mexico Museum of Art, Vladem Contemporary; Mass MoCA; , Millay Arts and Golden Foundation for the Arts. Her work is held in international collections and is represented by Louis Stern Fine Arts, Gallery Sonja Roesch and Turner Carroll Gallery.
