= Pedro Hernandez (artist) =

Cuban-American artist (born 1932)

- Born: Pedro Hernández Domínguez; August 11, 1932 (age 94); Havana, Cuba
- Education: University of Havana
- Occupations: Artist, curator, medical doctor
- Years active: 1950s–present
- Known for: Sculpture, cut-drawings
- Movement: Biomorphism

Pedro Hernandez Dominguez (born 1932) is a Cuban American artist primarily known for his sculptures in wood and stone as well as paper medium works. Since beginning his art career in the 1950s, he has been primarily active in Cuba, the United States, and Europe. He is among the significant contributing artists to the establishment of Cuban art in South Florida during the 20th century. His artwork has gained recognition for his awards, use in public art, coverage in media and published Cuban art literature, as well as international exhibitions. Hernandez is included in the permanent collection of the Museo Nacional de Bellas Artes de La Habana, the Museum of Geometric and MADI Art, the City of Hialeah, and the Miami-Dade Public Library System.

== Early life and career in Cuba ==
Pedro Hernández Domínguez was born on August 11, 1932, in Havana, Cuba. He was the only child of Havana medical doctor Pedro Lorenzo Hernández Gómez and his wife Eliosa Domínguez Lopez. Hernández was subsequently raised in Havana and attended the Instituto Edison de La Habana for both his primary and secondary education. He then pursued dual careers in medicine and the arts as a sculptor, graduating with his doctorate in medicine from the University of Havana in 1957. That same year he participated in his first art exhibition in which he quickly established himself and was awarded the Third Prize in Sculpture at the Círculo de Bellas Artes of Havana. Following this debut, Hernández was invited the following year by artist Raquel Lazaro, then-president of Havana's prestigious Lyceum Lawn Tennis Club, to participate in the Lyceum's collective 1958 exhibition Artistas Noveles.

1959 would be a formative year for Hernández early career. That year he was accepted into and participated in the Annual Exhibition of Fine Arts (Painting, Sculpture and Engraving) at the Palacio de Bellas Artes of Havana with other leading Cuban sculptors including Roberto Estopiñán, Enrique Gay García, Tomas Olivia, and Rudolfo Tardo. Hernández also exhibited his sculpture Trio at the prominent Cuban art gallery Color Luz, owned by the painters Loló Soldevilla and Pedro de Oraá.

While immersing himself in the Havana art scene, he was introduced to leading Cuban Vanguardia artist Victor Manuel, regarded as the Father of Modern Cuban Art, in 1959 by their mutual friend, Cuban painter Jorge Perez Castaño. Hernández and Victor Manuel became close friends and would exhibit together. Hernández would also become connected to other prominent Cuban artists in this period including Amelia Peláez and Jose Maria Mijares.

During the 1960s, Hernández' art career expanded to become active internationally. In 1960 he was selected among the artists chosen to represent Cuba in the InterAmerican Biennial in Mexico. In 1964 Hernández began to work in clay after being inspired by witnessing the ceramic works of Amelia Peláez and her assistant Merallo. In 1965, Hernández held a joint exhibition with Victor Manuel displaying Hernández's sculptures alongside Manuel's paintings at the Lyceum Tennis Club. The showing was met with acclaim and gave Hernández significant further exposure for his art career through coverage by major Cuban media of the time, including by prominent Cuban art critic Loló de la Torriente of El Mundo. The rest of the decade would see Hernández relocate and establish his art beyond Cuba.

== Art career in the United States ==
Hernández and his family left Cuba in 1968. After initially staying in Spain, they permanently resettled in Miami in 1969 where they joined the Cuban exile community there. In 1971 he became connected to the Romanian artist Gigi Aramescu who would become another close associate and significant influence on his art.

One decade following his joint exhibition with Victor Manuel at Havana's Lyceum Tennis Club, Hernández resumed his exhibiting career with the first showing of his art in United States as part of the 1975 Semana de la Cultura Cubana collective exhibition in the University of Miami. In 1977 Hernández exhibited in the second Re-Encuentro Cubano exhibition alongside other prominent Cuban artists in exile such as Rafael Soriano, and Gabriel Sorzano, and Grupo GALA-founder Enrique Riveron. Hernández would also participate in the third installment of the exhibition in 1978. Also in 1978, Hernandez collaborated with artist and Miami-Dade Public Library System Community Relations Director Margarita Cano to participate in fourteen annual exhibitions in various system libraries. Two would be solo exhibitions of Hernández's work: one 1982 at the registered landmark Coral Gables Library, and another in 1986 at the Coral Reef Library. Hernández would also enter the Miami-Dade Public Library System's permanent collection, which had been founded by Cano.

The late 1970s and early 1980s would be another pivotal period in Hernández's career. In a major development, Hernández expanded his output beyond sculpture in 1979 with the development of what would be called "cut drawings" by critic and curator Juan Espinosa Almodóvar. Made from layers of cut colored paper with forms that evoked his organic sculptures, Hernández's cut-drawings have been recognized as innovative by many art critics including Almodóvar, Armando Alvarez Bravo, and Margarita Cano, and would grow to become one of his signature mediums alongside wood sculpture. The following year, Hernández joined the international Biomorphism art movement in 1980 after being influenced by the work of Hans Arp. That year he also participated in Re-Encuetro Cubano's last major exhibition, spotlighting the then-contemporary Peruvian Havana Embassy crisis, during which 10865 Cuban took refuge in Havana's Peruvian Embassy.

In 1981 Hernández participated in the Miami Tumble performance art piece, the first work of street art in Miami, organized by Margarita Cano alongside contributions by other leading contemporary artists such as Andy Warhol, Barbara Young, and Lowell Nesbitt. In 1982 he began signing his works as simply "Pedro Hernández" (as opposed to "Hernández Domínguez") and also began to work with bronze as a new sculptural medium. He is also the subject of a solo exhibition in the Coral Gables Library, which includes his wood sculptures as well as his Blue Series of cut-drawings. The following year Hernández was awarded the CINTAS Foundation for Visual Arts in sculpture of 1983–1984.

In 1987 Hernández participated in a collective exhibition in Tonneins-Bordeaux, France coordinated by International Art Connection, for which he won an award for one of his cut-drawings, El Teide. The following year another of his cut-drawings, the triptych Medusa, was exhibited in the Palais du Luxembourg. In 1991 Hernández created a conceptual "forest" art installation of free-standing wood beams for the Metro Resource Center in downtown Miami.

In 1998 Hernandez exhibited with the New London Art Society Gallery in Connecticut as well as in the launch of O&Y Gallery in Coral Gables with noted Cuban painter Miguel Ordoqui. O&Y Gallery, overseen by artistic director Alina Marrero, would represent Hernández for much of the following decade from 1998 to 2007, in which time Hernández exhibited frequently. Significant exhibitions of Hernández's work from his time with O&Y Gallery included Medusa (2000), Maison des Dames (2003), and Venezia, La Serenissima (2007).

Another pivotal development in Hernández's career came with the new millennium as he further expanded his oeuvre into the mediums of soapstone and alabaster. In 2001, his cut drawing Horizon was accepted into and featured in the 2nd World Festival of Art on Paper, held in Bled, Slovenia. That same year Hernández was recruited to participate in Absolut Chalk, a large-scale street art project in Miami Beach sponsored by Absolut Vodka.

In 2006 Hernández was selected and commissioned to produce the large scale metal sculpture Hialeah Beat as a public artwork for the City of Hialeah through its Art in Public Places Program. The piece was later exhibited in the 2024 exhibition In Plain Sight: Public Art in Miami x Artists of Cuban Heritage in Belen Jesuit's Saladrigas Gallery. In 2008 he was the subject of a solo exhibition in Stonington, Connecticut organized by painters Guido Garaycochea and José Ulloa featuring both sculpture and cut-drawings. Two years later he exhibited additional cut-drawings in Connecticut's Lyman Allyn Art Museum.

2012 was another transition period in Hernández career in which he expanded his involvement in exhibitions into curation. That year he began curating the 7 Plus One Art Project, and has since curated other exhibitions. Hernández 's involvement in the 7 Plus One Art Project came through Cuban artist Emilio Hector Rodriguez with the initial concept centered on exhibiting seven painters and one sculptor. Also in 2012, Hernández's own work began a stylist shift towards geometric abstraction. This shift was the shown in the collective exhibition Lines: Contemporary Geometric Abstraction held at Cremata Art Gallery.

In July 2015, Hernández was the focus of the solo exhibition Geometry in Motion in Miami Dade College's West Campus with text by art historian Anelys Álvarez Muñoz.

In 2019 he was included in The Museum of Geometric and MADI Art's 2019 biennale and accepted into their permanent collection.

In 2024 he was the subject of the solo exhibition Pedro Hernandez: Geometric Abstraction in the Museum of Contemporary Art of The Americas. The exhibition showcased his later-career focus on geometric abstraction since 2012, particularly through his cut-drawings and ceramic plates. In September 2024, one of Hernandez’ cut-drawings, Pyramids, from his Chaos XXI series, was accepted into the permanent collection of the Alvin Sherman Library, one of the largest libraries in the state of Florida, as part of the Marta Permuy Legacy Collection. The library's permanent collection also features work by Salvador Dalí, Dale Chihuly, Peter Max, and Neith Nevelson. The piece was subsequently unveiled with an exhibition at the library in October 2024 to coincide with Hispanic Heritage Month.

== Artwork analysis ==
Hernández's artwork has been extensively critiqued by noted critics of Cuban and American art, including José Gómez-Sicre, Loló de la Torriente, Juan Espinosa Almodóvar, Rafael Casalíns, Armando Alvarez Bravo, and Lillian Dobbs.

His sculpture works are considered part of the international Biomorphism movement and known for their organic and fluid qualities that convey movement. While often abstract, his works have frequently been associated with sensual or poetic themes. Hernandez also frequently incorporates elements of color, such as blue patina, into the grooves of his sculptures to emphasize and enhance their forms. Within his creative process, Hernández has stated in interviews that he never begins his works with any objective or goal for the piece, instead utilizing an intuitive process that responds to the unique qualities he finds within the medium he is working with. As a multimedia and interdisciplinary artist, Hernández is most known for his work in wood, though he has also worked within the mediums of stone, metal, marble, alabaster, paper, ceramic as well as mixed media, conceptual, and installation art.

Despite being an autodidact, Hernández art has been influenced by the work of other artists. De la Torriente, Alvarez Bravo, and other critics have noted influence from Cuban artists Wifredo Lam and Agustin Cárdenas while Hernández has also acknowledged influence from European artists Hans Arp and Gigi Aramescu. Hernández has also drawn inspiration from various multicultural sources. His cut-drawings have been influenced by Panamanian molas and his broader oeuvre has drawn influence from the stylistic fluidity of Art Nouveau movement as well as elements of African art and art of New Guinea.

In de la Torriente's critique of Hernández's joint exhibition with Victor Manuel, she assessed that Hernández "is a great and pure sculptor who extracts all the values from the piece he is working on [...]. His vertical works Jibacoa, Enlace, and Erosion contain a beauty that stylizes human aspirations. The horizontals [...] display an imaginative flight and recreate a harmonic serenity that compete with dreams."

Among Hernández's significant works is his Medusa series. Spanning several mediums, the series began in the 1980s through his paper cut-drawings medium and, in 2000, the series was also among Hernández's first forays into stone sculpture, reinforced by its conceptual ties to the Greek myth of Medusa. Works from the series have been exhibited in the United States in Europe. Key works include the triptych Medusa Antillana (1989, cut-drawing), The Eye (2000, cut-drawing), Land of the Gorgons (2000, cut-drawing), Aegean Medusa (2000, cut-drawing), and The Eye of the Serpent (2000, black soapstone sculpture). The series was the focus of Hernández's 2000 Coral Gables solo exhibition Medusa in O&Y Gallery.

Since 2012, Hernández work has increasingly shifted into an embrace of abstract and geometric art. His work since this shift has been featured at The Museum of Geometric and MADI Art and the Museum of Contemporary Art of The Americas.

== Recognition and legacy ==
Throughout his six decade career, Hernández's work has been covered extensively in media, including by Diario Las Americas, The Miami Herald, The Miami News, El Mundo, Revista Replica, La Peregrina Magazine, Florida Exclusive Magazine, La Voz, ARTDISTRICTS Magazine, and Nagari Magazine. He has also been mentioned in published literature of Cuban art, including the books Cuban Art in Exile by José Gómez Sicre (1989), El Arte Cubano En El Exilio by Armando Alvarez Bravo (2015), Escultura en Cuba: Siglo XX by Jose Veigas Zamora (2005), and Cuban-American Art in Miami: Exile, Identity, and the Neo-Baroque by Lynette M.F. Bosch (2004). In 2013 he was the subject of book Pedro Hernández: Line in Movement, the first official monograph of his career produced with his participation.

Hernández has exhibited his work in the United States, Europe and Latin America, including in New York City, Washington D.C., Miami, Connecticut, France, Cuba, Slovenia, Panama, Costa Rica, and Luxembourg. In addition to commercial fine art galleries, his work has been featured in several museums, cultural centers, and venues such as the Koubek Center, the Lyman Allyn Art Museum, the Museum of Contemporary Art of The Americas, Museum of Geometric and MADI Art, the Cuban Museum of Art and Culture, Museo de Bellas Artes, Mexico, D.F., Musée du Luxembourg, Palacio de Bellas Artes de la Habana, and the Palais du Luxembourg.

He has also shown his work in educational venues and libraries such as the University of Miami, University of Connecticut, Miami Dade College, Florida International University, Connecticut College, Belen Jesuit Preparatory School, and the Miami-Dade Public Library System.

Outside of traditional art venues and circuits, Hernández has also been commissioned for public art and collaborated with established companies and organizations such as Absolut Vodka and Miami Children's Hospital, as well as participated in charity art auctions.

He exhibited his work alongside other prominent Cuban artists such as painters Victor Manuel, Rafael Soriano, Enrique Riveron, Lourdes Gómez Franca, sculptors Enrique Gay Garcia, Tony Lopez, Rafael Consuegra, and Gabriel Sorzano. He has also exhibited with international artists not of Cuban heritage, such as Gigi Aramescu, Neith Nevelson, and Roxana McAllister-Kelly.

=== Awards ===
Hernández's work has been recognized with several awards throughout his career in Cuba, the United States, and France. They include:

- 1957: Third Prize in Sculpture, Círculo de Bellas Artes, Havana, Cuba
- 1980: Douglas Valldejuli Award, Miami, Florida
- 1983: CINTAS Foundation Fellowship, New York City, New York
- 1988: First Prize in Creativity and Collage, Tonneins-Bordeaux, France
- 1988: First Prize in Ceramics, Koubek Center, Miami, Florida
- 2006: Second Prize in Sculpture, Art Fest, Doral Rotary Club, Doral Florida

== Select exhibitions ==
Hernández has featured his work in over 80 exhibitions throughout his career.

Select exhibitions since 1957:

- 1957: Il Exposicion de Escultura, Circulo de Bellas Artes, Havana, Cuba
- 1958: Pinturas y Esculturas, Galeria Color Luz, Havana
- 1958: Artistas Noveles, Lyceum Lawn Tennis Club, Havana
- 1958: IV Exposicion de Escultura, Circulo de Bellas Artes, Havana
- 1959: Salon Anual, Palacio de Bellas Artes, Havana
- 1960: Bienal InterAmericana, Museo de Bellas Artes, Mexico, D.F.
- 1965: Dibujos de Victor Manuel y maderas Hernández, Lyceum Lawn Tennis Club, Havana
- 1975: Semana de la Cultura Cubana, University of Havana, Coral Gables, Florida
- 1977: Re-Encuentro Cubano, Cuban Museum of Arts and Culture, Miami, Florida
- 1978: Re-Encuentro Cubano: Paintings & Sculptures, Miami
- 1978: Collective Exhibition, La Petite Galerie, Burdine's, Miami
- 1978: Cuban Sculptors, Kromex Gallery, New York City, New York
- 1979: Fine Arts Show collective exhibition, Museum of Science, Miami
- 1979: Barbara Gillman Gallery, Miami
- 1979: Meeting Point Art Center, Coral Gables
- 1979: Spanish American Artists, Miami-Dade Community College, Miami
- 1979: Christmas Exhibition, De Armas Gallery, Miami
- 1980: Channel 2 WPBT Fine Arts Juried Show, Miami
- 1980: Art Auction and Exhibition, International Rescue Committee, Bacardi Gallery, Miami
- 1980: Re-Encuentro Cubano: 10805 a participation piece, Main Library, Miami
- 1980: Sculptures by Pedro Hernandez, InerAmericas Art Gallery, Coral Gables
- 1981: Collective Exhibition, La Petite Gallery, Burdines, Miami
- 1981: Channel 2 WPBT Fine Arts Show, Metropolitan Museum, Coral Gables
- 1981: The Downtown Art Wave '81: Miami Tumble, Miami
- 1981: Art for Art Collectors, Allison Island, Miami Beach, Florida
- 1982: The Downtown Art Wave: Miami Tumble Revisited, Miami
- 1982: Sculptures and Drawings by Pedro Hernández, Coral Gables Library, Coral Gables
- 1983: Two Men Show, Gallery at Grove Isle, Coconut Grove, Florida
- 1984: Commission for Outdoor Sculpture, Cocoplum, Coral Gables
- 1985: Collective exhibition, De Berz Galleries, Coconut Grove
- 1985: Le Petit Format, Sibi Cultural Center, Miami
- 1986: VIII Salon de Otono, Koubek Memorial Center, Miami
- 1986: Pedro Hernández: Cut-drawings and Wood Sculptures, Coral Reef Library, Miami
- 1987: Pedro Hernández: Art Exhibition, Miami Children's Hospital, Miami
- 1987: Ceramics as Canvas, 15th Annual Hispanic Heritage Month, Miami
- 1987: Contemporary Cuban Art, Metropolitan Museum and Art Center, Coral Gables
- 1988: Ceramic Plates by Cuban Artists, South Dade Regional Library, Miami
- 1988: Art in Smoke: Artists' Cigar Boxes, Coral Gables Library, Coral Gables
- 1988: CINTAS Fellows Revisited: A Decade After, Miami Main Library, Miami
- 1988: Collective exhibition event, In Concert For Children with AIDS, Miami
- 1988: Grand Prix d'Aquitaine, Tonneins-Bordeaux, France
- 1988: IX Salon de Otono, Koubek Memorial Center, Miami
- 1989: Les 3 Ameriques a Paris, Musee de Luxembourg, Paris, France
- 1990: Art Auction and Exhibition, Artists Pro Genesis (AIDS Hospice), Miami
- 1990: Art Auction and Exhibition: Children's Cancer Caring Center, Miami
- 1991: Artists Pro Genesis, Metropolitan Art Museum, Coral Gables
- 1991: The Forest of Pedro Hernández, Metro-Dade Cultural Resource Center, Miami
- 1995: Collective exhibition, La Bohème Fine Art Gallery, Coral Gables
- 1996: Genesis Group Show, Lia Galleti Gallery, Coral Gables
- 1997: Arte IberoAmericano 1900–1990, Ediciones Arte UNESCO, Madrid, Spain
- 1998: Joint exhibition by Miguel Ordoqui and Pedro Hernández, O&Y Gallery, Coral Gables
- 1998: The 2nd Annual BARE Exhibit, Pfizer Central Research Building, Connecticut
- 1999: Collective Exhibition, O&Y Gallery, Coral Gables
- 1999: Pedro Hernández at New London Art Society, New London Art Society Gallery, Connecticut
- 2000: Medusa, One-man show, O&Y Gallery, Coral Gables
- 2001: Absolut Chalk, Street Painting Festival, Light Bringer Project, Miami Beach
- 2001: 2nd World Festival of Art on Paper, Bled, Slovenia
- 2002: Flamingoes on the Beach, Outdoor Sculpture Installation, Art in Public Places, Miami Beach
- 2002: Latin Strokes group exhibition, Naples, Florida
- 2003: Maison des Dames: Erotic Art by Pedro Hernández and Miguel Ordoqui, O&Y Gallery, Coral Gables
- 2003: Latin Views, Branford Mansion of the University of Connecticut, Avery Point Campus, Groton, Connecticut
- 2004: Salon de Verano: Hand painted ceramic plates by Pedro Hernández, O&Y Gallery, Coral Gables
- 2004: Master's Mystery Art Show, Florida International University, Miami Beach
- 2005: Initium Collective Art Exhibit, Obini Productions, Miami
- 2005: Awakenings: A Three Men Show, The Results Gallery, Washington D.C.
- 2006: ARWI, Art & Wine Fair San Juan, Puerto Rico
- 2006: Angels, Group show, Cremata Fine Arts Gallery, Miami
- 2007: Surfside Arts Festival, Surfside, Florida
- 2007: Kick off Basel, Obini Art Gallery, Miami
- 2008: One man show: Sense & Sensible, Latins in the Borough Art Gallery, Connecticut
- 2008: Latin America: Toward an Apollonian Expression, Latins in the Borough Art Gallery & Hygienic Art Gallery, Connecticut
- 2009: Hispanic Art Expressions, Coral Gables and Doral, Florida
- 2009: Abstractomicina, Cremata Fine Arts Gallery, Miami
- 2010: Members Collect: The Thrill of the Chase, Lyman Allyn Art Museum, Connecticut
- 2011: Contemporary Art from the Latin World, LNVA Permanent Collection, Charles A. Shain Library at Connecticut College, Connecticut
- 2012: Real Abstraction, Miami-Dade College West Campus, Doral
- 2015: Geometry in Motion, Miami-Dade College MDC-West, Miami
- 2019: Museum of Geometric and MADI Art 2019 Biennale: Origins in Geometry, The Museum of Geometric and MADI Art, Dallas, Texas
- 2024: In Plain Sight: Public Art in Miami x Artists of Cuban Heritage, Saladrigas Gallery, Belen Jesuit Preparatory School, Miami
- 2024: Pedro Hernandez: Geometric Abstraction, the Museum of Contemporary Art of The Americas, Miami

== Personal life ==
Hernández married his wife Margarita Saíz Lopez (1931–2021) in 1958. The two would have a daughter, Margarita, in 1960 and a son, Pedro Javier, in 1964, and a granddaughter Sydney in 2000.

== Permanent collections ==
Hernández art has been included in the following public collections:

- CINTAS Foundation Fellowship Collection
- Cuban Museum of Arts and Culture
- Miami-Dade Public Library System permanent collection
- NSU Alvin Sherman Library permanent collection
- Hialeah Art in Public Places Collection
- Raul L. Martinez Center Plaza
- Bay Harbor Islands, Florida
- Latin Network for the Visual Art, Gales Ferry, Connecticut
- The Museum of Geometric and MADI Art
- Museo Nacional de Bellas Artes de La Habana, Cuba

== See also ==
- Cuban art
- Cubans in Miami
