= María Brito =

Cuban-American artist

Maria Cristina Brito
- Born: 1947 (age 78–79); Havana, Cuba

María Brito (born María Cristina Brito in 1947 in Havana, Cuba) is a Cuban-American artist specializing in painting, sculpture and installations.

== Early life and education ==
Brito entered the United States by way of the mass exodus Operation Peter Pan, with her parents following in 1962. Brito received her Bachelor of Fine Arts from Florida International University (FIU) in 1978, and in 1979 obtained her Master of Fine Arts from the University of Miami in Coral Gables, Florida.

== Career ==
Brito was recognized with Fellowships from CINTAS Foundation and National Endowment for the Arts Visual Artists. Her work was exhibited nationally and internationally, with solo exhibitions at the Museum of Contemporary Hispanic Art in New York, the Museum of Art in Fort Lauderdale and the Polk Museum of Art. Brito was invited to create a sculpture for the 1988 Olympic Games Sculpture Park in Seoul, Korea.

== Individual exhibitions ==
- 1980 – The Gallery at 24, Miami, Florida, E.E.U.U.
- 1985 – "María Brito Avellana, George Dombek, Larry Rhoads", Florida Center for Contemporary Art, Tampa, Florida.
- 1989 – "María Brito Avellana: Recent Sculpture"´´, Interamerican Art Gallery, Miami, Florida.
- 1989 – Museum of Contemporary Hispanic Art (MoCHA), New York City.
- 1991 – "María Brito: A Retrospective", Barry University Gallery, Miami Shores, Florida.
- 1991 – "María Brito: A Retrospective" Anne Jaffe Art Gallery, Bay Harbour, Florida.

== Awards ==
- 1977 – Excellence in Art – Florida International University, Miami, Florida, U.S.A.;
- 1980 – Merit Award – Grove House, Coconut Grove, Miami, Florida, U.S.A.;
- 1988 – Individual Artists Fellowship Award – Florida Department of State, Florida, U.S.A.;
- 1988 – Pollock-Krasner Foundation Grant, U.S.A.

== Collections ==
Her work can be found in several permanent collections:

- Archer M. Huntington Art Gallery, University of Texas at Austin, Austin, Texas
- Blanton Museum of Art
- Cintas Collection Inc, New York City
- Miami-Dade College, Kendall Campus, Miami, Florida
- Olympic Sculpture Park, Seoul, Korea
- Smithsonian American Art Museum, Washington, D.C.
- Miami-Dade Public Library System, Miami, Florida
