= Museum of Geometric and MADI Art =

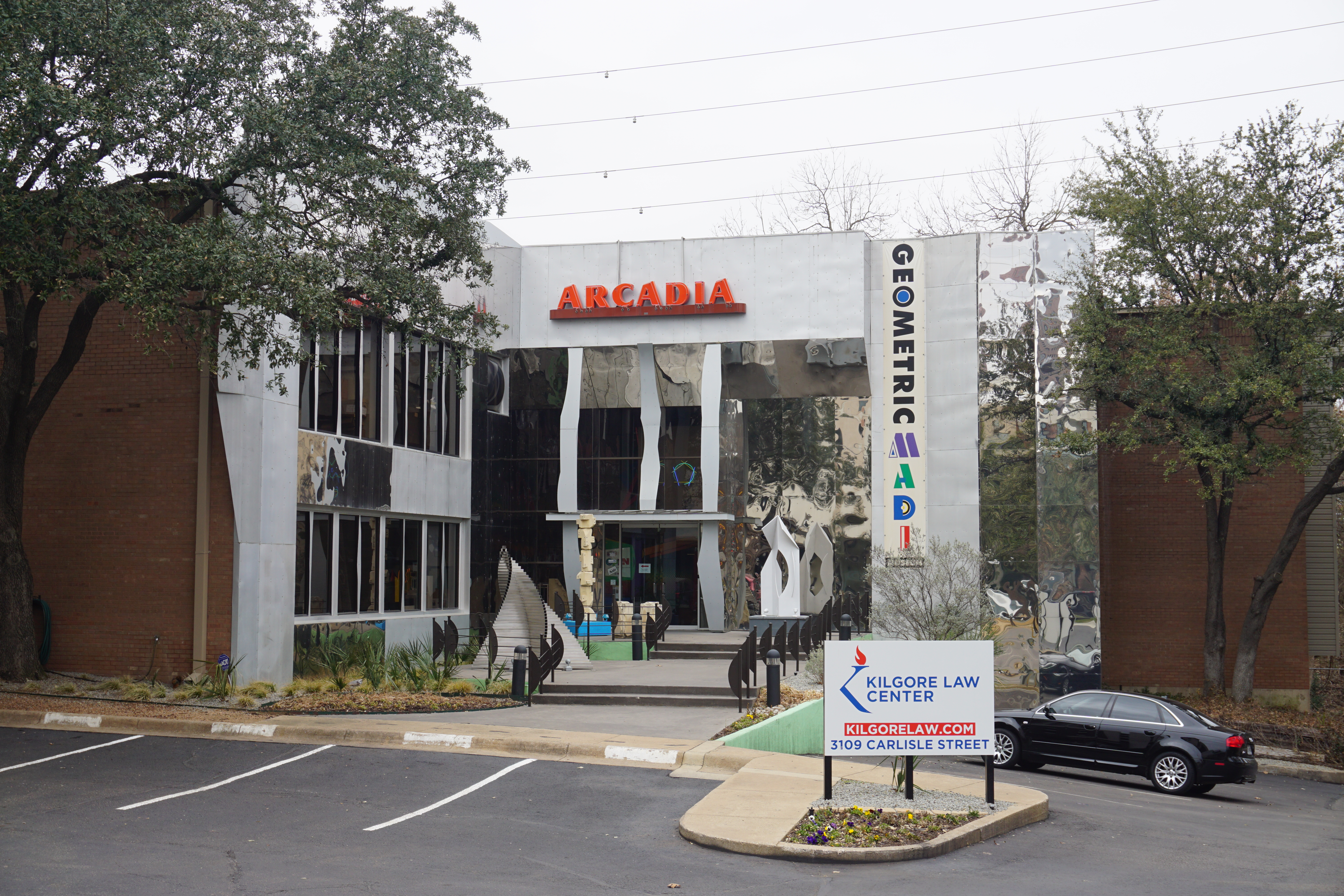
- Exterior of the Museum of Geometric and MADI Art

- Location within Texas
- Established: 2002
- Location: 3109 Carlisle; Dallas, Texas
- Coordinates: 32.8040°N 96.8031°W
- Type: Art museum
- Founders: Bill and Dorothy Masterson
- Website: www.geometricmadimuseum.org

The Museum of Geometric and MADI Art is a museum in Dallas dedicated to abstract art and the Madí movement. The only such museum in North America, travel writer Emily Toman describes it as "one of the most underrated art museums in Dallas".

== History ==
The Museum of Geometric and MADI Art was founded in 2002 by Bill and Dorothy Masterson, art enthusiasts who developed an interest in Madí art and began collecting works in the style. The Mastersons opened a permanent museum featuring Madí art in their firm, Kilgore & Kilgore's, new building at 3109 Carlisle in Dallas. The building was subsequently renovated in the Madí style. This renovation, which Bill Masterson commissioned Uruguayan Madí artist Volf Roitman to design, transformed "the architecturally uninteresting Kilgore Law Center building into a giant example of cut-out MADI art", according to Tampa Bay Times journalist Barbara L. Fredricksen. In 2005, Roitman, then age 74, was serving as the creative director of the museum.

== Programs and exhibitions ==
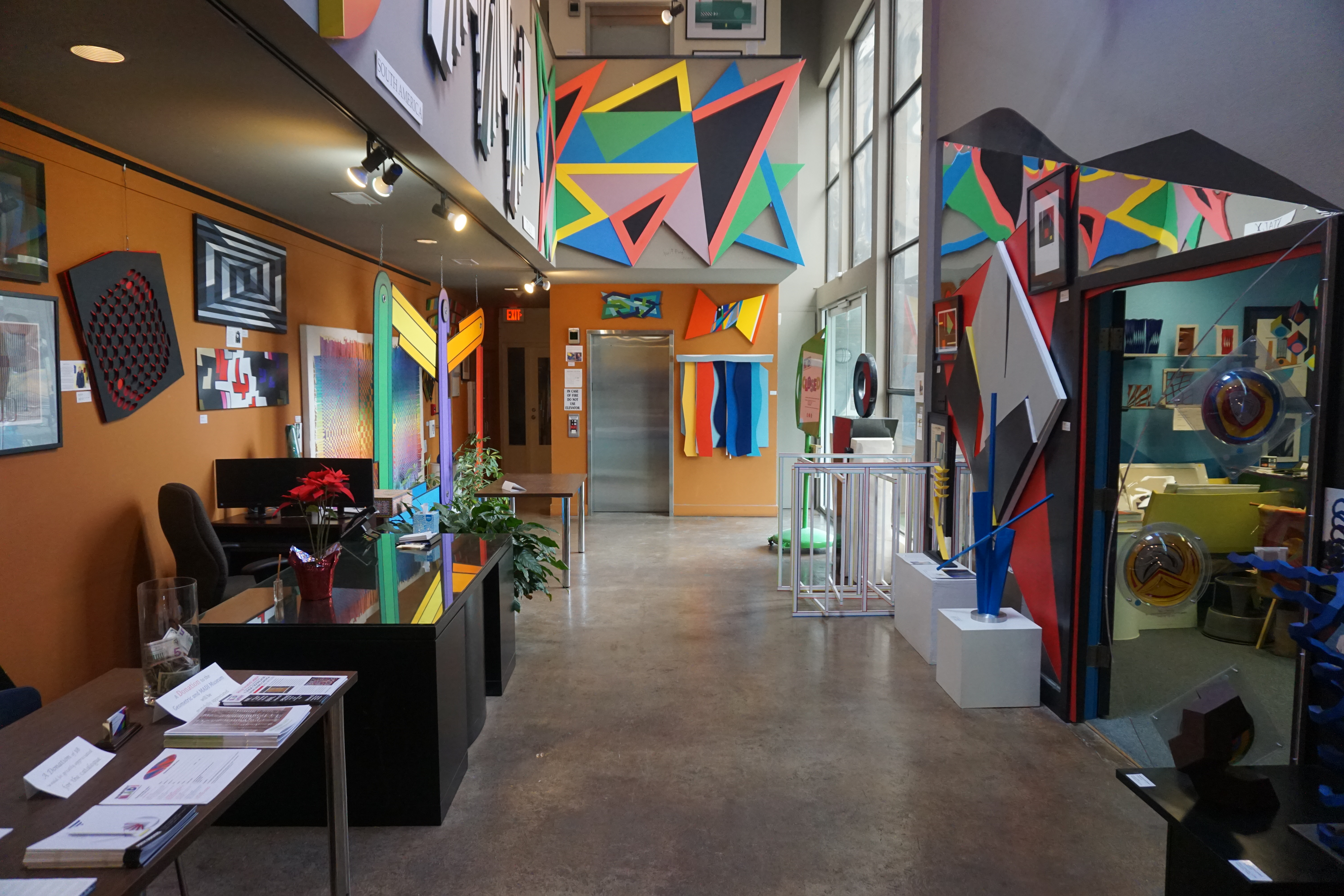
Interior of the Museum of Geometric and MADI Art

The Museum of Geometric and MADI Art offers the Arcadia Salon discussion series featuring artists and art experts; the name derives from the Arcadia that once stood on Greenville Avenue in Dallas, the sign from which presently adorns the museum exterior. The museum also provides creative workshops for both students and seniors as well as docent-led tours that are available upon request. It hosts an annual benefit known as the Geometric Gala, which includes a silent auction of artwork by both local artists and those of global renown. The museum features art from around the world in its permanent collection, and it has also hosted exhibitions by artists such as Yaacov Agam, Orna Feinstein, Mokha Laget and Liz Whitney Quisgard. Furthermore, Roitman's Madí Art Wall, which had previously been displayed at the museum in Dallas, was installed on the Wood Building in Marshall, Texas, in November 2009.
