= Carlos Alfonzo =

Cuban-American painter (1950–1991)

- Born: 1950; Cuba
- Died: 1991 (aged 40–41)

Carlos Alfonzo (1950–1991) was a Cuban-American painter known for his neo-impressionistic style. His work has been collected by Whitney Museum of American Art and Smithsonian Institution.

== Early life and education ==
He was born in Havana, Cuba, in 1950. He attended the Academia San Alejandro in Cuba, where he received a degree in art in 1973. He later attended the University of Havana, where he received an art history degree in 1977.

== Career ==
=== Exile from Cuba ===
In hopes of finally attaining true freedom as an individual and an artist, and after days spent crowded into the Peruvian Embassy, Alfonzo left Cuba via the Mariel boatlift in 1980, on a journey that was marred by violence. "One of many artists who came to the United States in the Mariel boat lift, Alfonzo quickly developed a following in this country."

=== International breakthrough ===
In a paradox reflective of his art, Carlos Alfonzo's profuse artistic energy reached new heights alongside rising critical acclaim; meanwhile, he quietly and privately faced the AIDS virus as it ravaged his body and life force. He was selected by the Whitney Museum of Art in New York as an artist exemplifying the most recent accomplishment in contemporary art, to be exhibited in the 1991 Biennial. Fate intervened; the artist died one month prior to the Biennial exhibition which anchored his position in contemporary art.

== Influences ==
Carlos Alfonzo's early work was inspired by the iconography of Castro-era propaganda. His later work is informed by the impressionistic style of masters Henri Matisse and Pablo Picasso. Alfonzo borrowed forms from Cuban Santería, medieval Catholic mysticism, and tarot cards to build a system of symbols floating in huge limpid tears. Many of his works holds subtle clues that evoke Alfonzo's homosexuality and the fear and anger generated by the AIDS epidemic.

His work was also influenced by Cuba artist Wifredo Lam.

== Death ==
Alfonzo's life was claimed by AIDS in Miami, Florida in 1991. "Morbid though the notion may sound, death became the work of Carlos Alfonzo." "Witness, a piece created by the artist in 1990, tackles the artist's own mortality as part of a series of 'Black Paintings' made shortly before his death."

== Exhibitions ==
Paradoxically, Alfonzo made the decision to leave Cuba just 8 months before the opening of the pivotal Volumen 1 (Volume 1) exhibition that heralded a new international direction in contemporary Cuban art, and where Alfonzo was slated to exhibit among those who would later become known as the 1980s generation.

Within the decade following his exile from Cuba, the young artist and political refugee was awarded a Cintas Fellowship in the visual arts in 1983 and a visual artist fellowship in Painting from the National Endowment for the Arts in Washington D.C. in 1984.

His work has been exhibited in solo and group shows on a national and international scale including the 1991 Whitney Biennial, the exhibition entitled Hispanic Art in the United States, which traveled to seven prominent American institutions, and the 41st Biennial Exhibition of Contemporary American Painting at Corcoran Gallery. "His work was represented in the Outside Cuba exhibition and the Cuba-USA: The First Generation traveling exhibition."

In 2016, the Pérez Art Museum Miami (PAMM) presented Carlos Alfonzo: Clay Works and Painted Ceramics, a career survey shedding light on Alfonzo's ceramic production. The exhibition included two studies for large murals in Miami. According to César Trasobares, the curator of Carlos Alfonzo: Clay Works and Painted Ceramics at PAMM:

“For Alfonzo, works in clay and ceramic were an integral part of his evolving pictorial expression.”

Carlos Alfonzo was the subject of several solo exhibitions in institutions including the Miami Art Museum, the Bass Museum of Art in Miami Beach, the Southeastern Center for Contemporary Art in North Carolina, and the Hal Bromm Gallery in New York. His work was featured in Triumph of the Spirit: Carlos Alfonso, A Survey 1975–1991, published by the Miami Art Museum.

=== Solo exhibitions ===
- 1990, Greene Gallery, Coral Gables, Florida
- 1990, Osuna Gallery, Washington, DC.
- 1990, Bass Museum of Art, Miami Beach, Florida
- 1989, Lannan Museum, Lake Worth, Florida
- 1989, McMurtey Gallery, Houston, Texas
- 1988, Hal Bromm Gallery, New York
- 1977, Museo Nacional, Havana, Cuba
- 1976, Galeria Amelia Pelaez, Havana, Cuba

=== Group exhibitions ===
- 1991, "Whitney Biennial", Whitney Museum of American Art, New York
- 1990, "The Decade Show" MoCHA (Museum of Contemporary Hispanic Art), New York, traveled to The New Museum of Contemporary Art and The Studio Museum in Harlem, New York
- 1990, "The 11th International Art Exposition", Navy Pier, Chicago, Illinois
- 1987, "Hispanic Art in the United States" Museum of Fine Arts, Houston, Texas

== Collections ==
Carlos Alfonzo has been collected by Whitney Museum of American Art and Smithsonian Institution. His work is in the permanent collection of the Miami-Dade Public Library, the Hirshhorn Museum and Sculpture Garden, the De la Cruz Collection The Rodriguez Collection, and numerous institutions of worldwide prominence. His work also forms part of private collections, including that of Peter Menendez.

== In popular culture ==
Carlos Alfonzo was one of three artists featured in the 1998 documentary film by Maria Lino, entitled Three Artist Profiles.
