= Barbara Neijna =

American sculptor

Barbara Neijna Martinez
- Born: 1937 (age 87–88); Philadelphia, Pennsylvania

Barbara Neijna Martinez (born 1937) is an American artist known for her sculpture and public art works.

Neijna holds a BFA degree from Syracuse University, New York. Her work is included in the collection of the Smithsonian American Art Museum. She has lived in South Florida since 1962 and her work is included in the collection of Pérez Art Museum Miami.

== Public art ==
- America, America, Tampa Riverwalk, 1977. Originally installed at the Hillsborough County Public Library.
- Red Sea Road City of Miami Beach. Destroyed by hurricane.
- Right Turn on White, Strom Thurmond Federal Building and United States Courthouse, 1979
- Elements for Passage at Dawn, Department of Education building, Tallahassee, Florida. 1986.
- Total Environment, Philadelphia, 1986
- Foreverglades, Miami International Airport, South terminal expansion, 2007.
