= Margarita Cano (politician) =

Mexican politician

Carmen Margarita Cano Villegas
- Born: 10 June 1953 (age 72); Chihuahua, Mexico
- Occupation: Politician
- Political party: PAN

Carmen Margarita Cano Villegas (born 10 June 1953) is a Mexican politician from the National Action Party. In 2012 she served as Deputy of the LXI Legislature of the Mexican Congress representing Chihuahua.
