= Craig Coleman (artist) =

American artist (1961–1994)

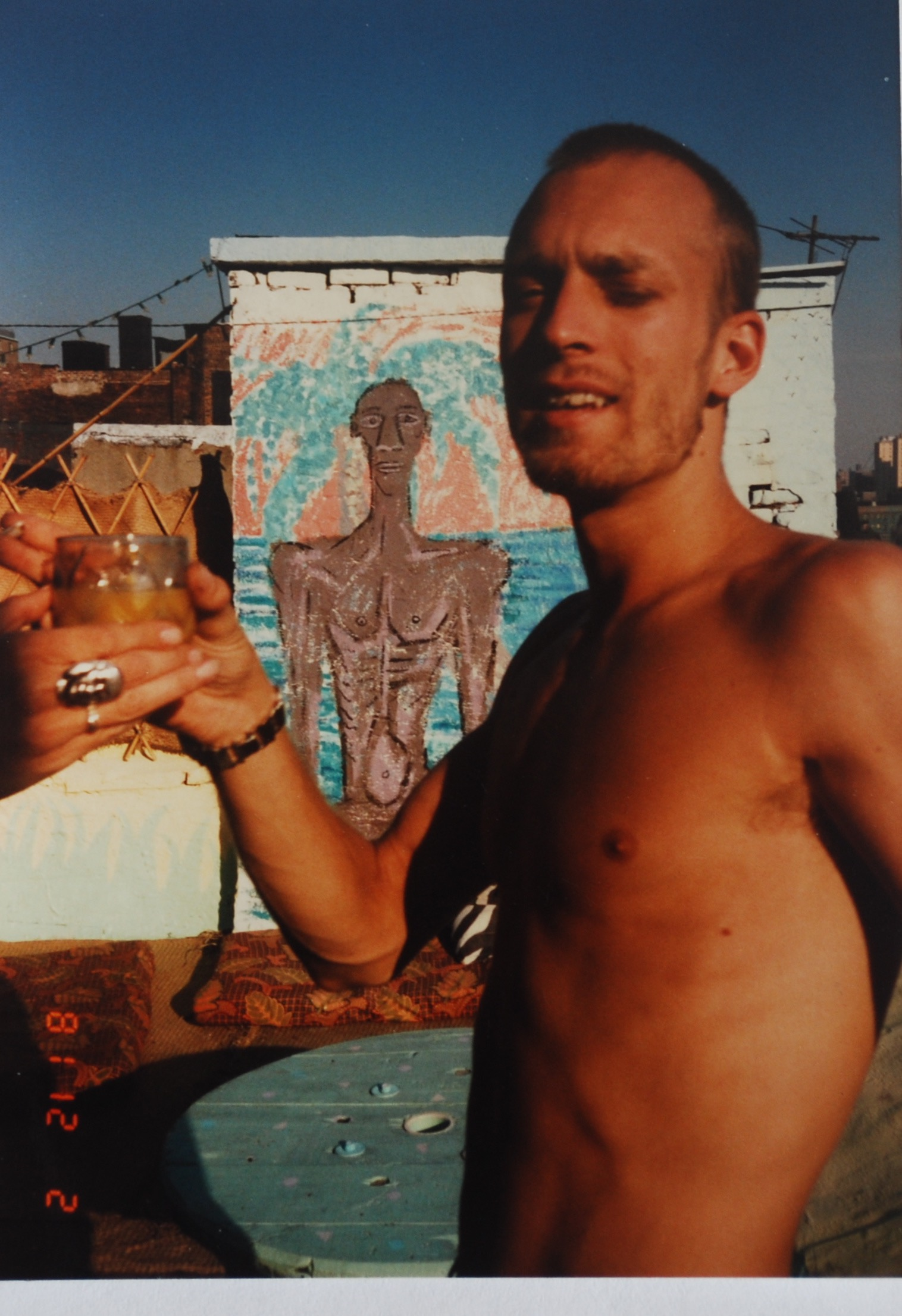
- Born: June 28, 1961; San Jose, California
- Died: December 3, 1994 (aged 33); Miami, Florida
- Occupation: Artist

Craig Coleman (June 28, 1961 – December 3, 1994) was an American artist.

== Biography ==
=== Early life ===
Coleman was born in San Jose, California. He graduated from Willow Glen High School in 1979 before moving to San Francisco in 1980 and New York City in 1981.

=== Career ===
Coleman was a contemporary of Jean-Michel Basquiat, Paul Benney, Keith Haring, Rick Prol, Kjell Erik Killi Olsen, Kenny Scharf, and Robert Mapplethorpe. He was a prominent figure in the Downtown Art Scene in the 80s, producing a prodigious body of work both in sculpture and painting, often using found materials. His first show was with 'The New Math Gallery', one of the pioneering galleries in the East Village. He shared studio space on 12th Street with the British artist Paul Benney.

Steven Rudy, a professor at New York University described Coleman's work as 'intensely spiritual'. Paul Bridgewater of The Bridgewater Gallery, one of Coleman's early champions called him 'Urban Primitive'. His first serious venture into performance was the show 'The year 8000', a multimedia event, at the 'La Mama Theater', NYC. With Steve Stevens, in 1988, he produced hundreds of paintings to illustrate slides for the show.

His artistic style changed with his move to Miami in 1989, reflecting the sunny, hedonistic, party atmosphere in South Beach. Coleman became involved with Drag Performance in Miami, with his alter ego 'Varla', while still producing serious art. 'Varla' inspired 'Varla TV', a cable TV show. His shows gained a cult following in South Beach, with Varla holding court at his Espanola Way studio. At this time, Coleman began contributing to a South Beach gossip column for 'Wire Magazine'. He used his talents to raise money for AIDS charities

One of Coleman's works is in the Museum of Contemporary Art, North Miami. A large body of his work was lost after his death, but much work survived due to his prolific output.

=== Death ===
Coleman died December 3, 1994 in Miami.

== Solo exhibitions ==
Year	Gallery	Location
1983	New Math Gallery	New York
1984	Gracie Mansion Gallery, Sculpture Garden, NYC, New Math Gallery	New York
1985	'Beyond Primitivism' Mark Twain Bank.	St Louis
1986	New Math Gallery	New York
1986	"Polynero 11' Turnhout.	Belgium
1986	Wessel O'Connor Gallery	Rome
1987	'Craig Coleman, paintings & Sculpture' Bridgewater Gallery,	NYC
1987	Mokotoff Gallery, New York.	NYC
1988	'The Year 8000' La Mama, with Steve Stevens	NYC
1989	'Studio A Go-Go' Washington St, South Beach	Miami, FL
1990	'Craig Coleman, AKA Varla' Century Hotel, South Beach,	Miami, FL
2015	'Craig Coleman, Summer was a Drag', Guccivuitton, Little Haiti	Miami, FL

== Group exhibitions ==
Year	Gallery	Location
2005	Vintage East Village, Hal Bromm Gallery	New York, NY
2012	'Crossing Houston', Smart Clothes Gallery	New York, NY
