= Donna Ruff =

American visual artist, curator and educator

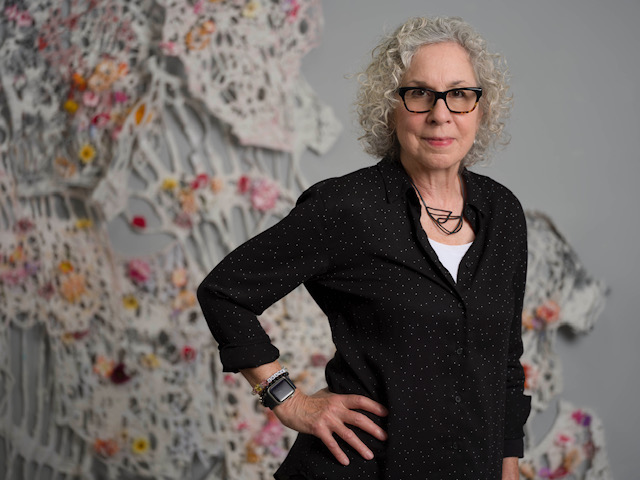
- Born: 1947 (age 78–79); Chicago, Illinois, U.S.
- Education: Mason Gross School of the Arts
- Known for: photography, mixed media art and printmaking
- Awards: Pollock-Krasner Foundation Grant, 2020 and Ellies Creator Award from Oolite Arts, 2021, MIA Individual Artist Grant, 2022, 2023, 2024, 2025
- Website: www.donnaruffstudio.com

Donna Ruff (born 1947) is an American visual artist, curator and educator. She works in mixed media on found printed matter, primarily newspaper headline pages and historical documents. Ruff questions how written and photographic narratives are constructed by removing and transforming printed text and image to recontextualize the portrayal of world events.

== Biography ==
From an early age Ruff developed a reverence for books, inspired by her grandparents’ scrap paper company in Chicago, Illinois. This exposure to salvaging and repurposing paper products, namely out of date books with sliced pages to prevent re-sale, influences Ruff's tendency to work simultaneously with additive and subtractive techniques. Ruff's primary interest in the materiality of paper and text, often involves burning, cutting, scraping, sewing and painting over newspaper and other printed media, leaving fragments of language and meaning, open to interpretation. The removal and altering of text and photographic image in her work emphasizes what is missing in biased and historically obscured narratives, with particular attention given to social justice issues concerning women, children and immigrants.

== Education ==
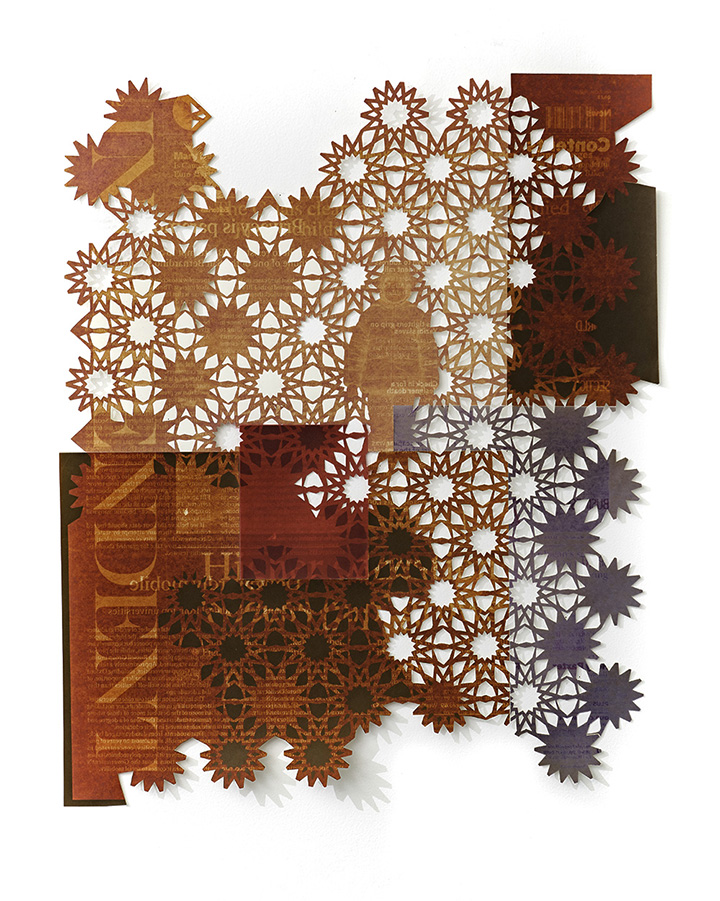
"Daniel", 2017, by Donna Ruff

Ruff earned an MA in Art History from Florida State University and worked as a graphic designer and book illustrator in the Miami area and later in New York City. She transitioned from commercial art to fine art after earning an MFA from Mason Gross School of the Arts. During her graduate studies Ruff was introduced to printmaking and papermaking at the Rutgers Center for Innovative Print and Paper and began incorporating these techniques into her art discipline. She was particularly drawn to the work of Lesley Dill, Kiki Smith, Nancy Spero, and the Starn Twins, all of whom influenced her experimentation with text and image by pushing the boundaries of working on paper. At Rutgers Ruff studied media theory with Martha Rosler, which was fundamental in developing her critical analysis of documentary journalism and material culture.

== Career ==
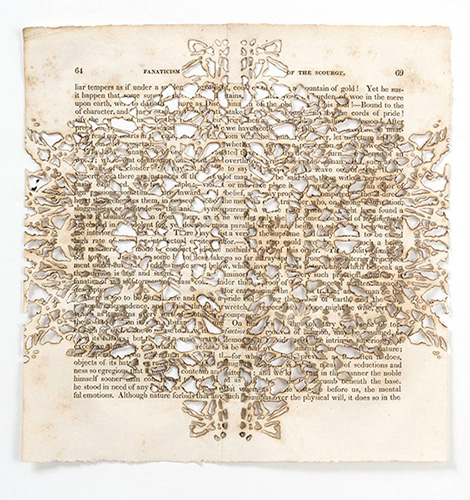
"Fanatic 3", 2008, by Donna Ruff, burned book page

Ruff juxtaposes the contrast of positive and negative space with the removal of text to emphasize redacted and otherwise obscured histories. Her work addresses world events by responding to dominant narratives found in news headlines. She began using burning treatments on paper after the World Trade Center twin towers collapsed during the September 11 attacks. Her technique of cutting negative space into newspaper pages using geometric patterns adapted from Judaic and Islamic motifs, coincided with the Arab Spring uprising. A body of work focused on the migrant crisis, composed of laser-cut blankets with printed imagery of asylum seekers, grew out of a response to news coverage of refugees fleeing the Syrian civil war. Ruff's esteem for the printed word, affected by realities of censorship, is evident throughout her artwork, which she describes as "an artifact capturing a particular period in time."

Ruff's work has been exhibited at the Victoria and Albert Museum (London), The Print Center (Philadelphia, PA); New Mexico Museum of Art (Santa Fe, NM), Patricia and Philip Frost Art Museum (Miami, FL), Mesa Contemporary Arts Museum (Mesa, AZ), Center for Book Arts (NYC), Mass MOCA, Sol Lewitt Exchange (North Adams, MA), John Michael Kohler Arts Center (Sheboygan, WI), A.I.R. Gallery, New York, (NYC) and ArtSPACE New Haven (New Haven, CT). Ruff has worked as an artist in residence at PS 122 (NYC), Tamarind Institute (Albuquerque, NM), Künstlerhaus Bethanien, (Berlin, Germany), Deering Estate (Miami, FL) and Santa Fe Art Institute (Santa Fe, NM).

== Recognition ==
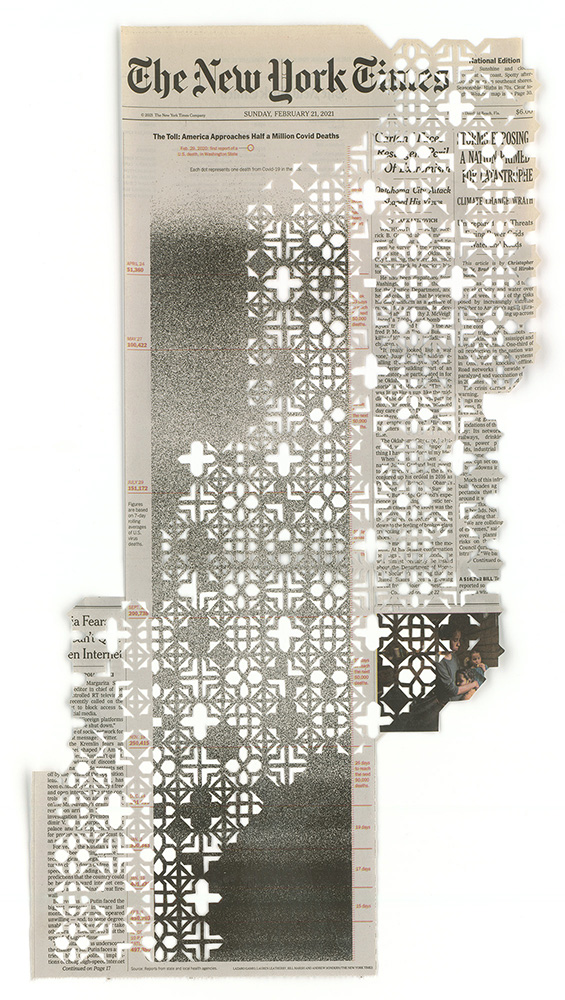
"2.21.21", by Donna Ruff, cut newspaper

Ruff has been a recipient of a Pollock Krasner Foundation Grant the MIA Individual Artist Grant, Miami-Dade County, the Ellies Creator Award from Oolite Arts, Miami, and was a nominee for the Anonymous Was a Woman award. Her work is held in the public collections of the Victoria and Albert Museum, Morgan Library & Museum, Smith College Museum of Art, Philip and Patricia Frost Art Museum in Miami, Yale University Art Gallery Chasanoff collection of artists books, Library of Congress, American Embassy in Berlin; the Jane Voorhees Zimmerli Art Museum at Rutgers University, and New Mexico Museum of Art.
