= Lydia Rubio =

Cuban-American artist (born 1946)

Lydia Rubio (born 1946) is a Cuban-American artist.

== Life and career ==
Rubio was born in 1946 in Havana. After attending the University of Florida and Universita degli Studi di Firenze, she obtained a Master's in Architecture from the Harvard Graduate School of Design, where she pursued visual studies with Rudolf Arnheim.

Her work consists of paintings, unique journals and large site-specific public art installations. Her work has been included in more than 30 solo exhibitions, and participated in national and international museum group shows. Rubio's works are in numerous private collections and museums such as The Esquenazy Museum at Indiana University, Santa Barbara Museum of Art, Lehigh University, the Cintas Collection at Miami-Dade College, the Museum of Art Fort Lauderdale and the Lowe Art Museum. Her artist books are in The Sackner Archive of Concrete Poetry, and in the libraries of Bryn Mawr College, Stanford, University of Southern California, University of Miami and the Wolfsonian at FIU. She has completed large public art commissions The Gate of Earth and the Gate of Air for Terminal C of the Raleigh Durham Airport, The Women's Park Miami-Dade County and the Carnival Passenger Terminal for the Port of Miami, Miami Dade Art In Public Places.

Rubio has been awarded fellowships from the Tree of Life, the Pollock Krasner Foundation, Cintas Foundation, the State of Florida and the Graham Foundation. She taught a design studio for two years at Harvard GSD and was a full-time instructor for five years at the University of Puerto Rico. At Parsons School of Design she developed the Visual Thinking Studio with the Department of Environmental Design over a three-year period. She has been invited as visiting artist to several fine arts programs at Altos de Chavon, Dominican Republic, and in the state of Florida. Rubio has lived in Cuba, Italy, Boston, New York City, Miami, Bogotá and Puerto Rico. Since 2018, she is based in Hudson, New York.

Her work has been exhibited in New York, Montreal, Bogotá and Miami. It has been featured in periodicals like Magazine of The Americas Society, ARTnews, The Miami Herald, El Nuevo Herald, Harvard GSD Magazine, Hemispheres Magazine, Southern Accents, Indulge Express and Elle Décor.
