= Mario Bencomo =

Cuban artist

Mario Bencomo (born 1953 in Cuba) is an artist. As an unaccompanied minor he was sent by his parents to live in Spain. At the age of 14, he left Madrid for the U.S., arriving by himself in New York City in the 1960s. He often returns to Europe, and for many years now for regular visits to Montreal, Canada. In 1996 he returns to visit Cuba for the first time, three decades after he left. An American Citizen, he is based in Miami.

His work is elegiac in concept; informed by myth, the ambiguity of form found in the natural world, literature, poetry, art history and personal experience; often blurring the line between the spiritual from the sensual. His work is in the collection of numerous museums, including, The Metropolitan Museum of Art, New York City; Norton Museum of Art, West Palm Beach; Denver Art Museum; Museo Nacional de Bellas Artes de La Habana, Cuba; Art Museum of the Americas, Washington, D.C.; Frederick R. Weisman Art Museum, Minneapolis; Frost Art Museum, Miami; Blanton Museum of Art, University of Texas, Austin; Polk Museum of Art, Lakeland, FL; Lowe Art Museum, University of Miami; Museo de Arte Contemporaneo, Panama City, Panama; Mizel Museum, Denver; NSU Art Museum Ft. Lauderdale, FL; State University of New York at Cortland; Lehigh University Art Galleries; Bethlehem, PA, among others.

== Exhibitions ==
Since 1977, Bencomo's work has been included in exhibitions at international museums and galleries. Among them, Museo de America, Madrid, Spain, Contemporary Art Center, New Orleans, Museo Nacional de Bellas Artes, La Habana, Cuba, National Library of Canada, Ottawa, Museo de Arte Contemporaneo, Panama City, Panama, Museum of Contemporary Art, Chicago, Centre d'Art Santa Monica, Barcelona, Spain, Museum of Contemporary Hispanic Art, New York, Musee des Tapisseries, Aix-en-Provence, France, Bass Museum, Miami Beach, Museo de Arte de Ponce, Puerto Rico, The Museum of Fine Arts, St. Petersburg, FL, Meadows Museum, Dallas, Atlanta College of Art, Los Angeles Municipal Art Gallery, Art Museum of the Americas, Washington, D.C., Southeast Center for Contemporary Art, Winston-Salem, NC, Museo del Barrio, New York, The Minnesota Museum of Art, St. Paul, Museum of Art, Ft. Lauderdale, Palacio de Bellas Artes, Mexico City, Contemporary Art Museum at USF, Tampa, Polk Museum of Art, Lakeland, Miami Art Center, FL, The Noyes Museum of Art, NJ, Snite Museum, University of Notre Dame, IN, Montgomery Museum of Fine Art, Herbert F. Johnson Museum of Art, Cornell University, NY, Boca Museum, FL, Centro Atlantico de Arte Moderno, Las Palmas de Gran Canarias, Spain, Greenhouse Gallery, Case Western Reserve University, Cleveland, Fundacio "La Caixa", Palma de Mallorca, Spain, Naples Museum of Art, FL, University at Buffalo Center for the Arts, NY.

Bencomo's work has been written about in books, catalogues and the art press by art historians, critics, poets and writers, including Donald Kuspit, Cris Hassold, Giulio V. Blanc, Carol Damian, Jose Gomez Sicre, Severo Sarduy, Janet Batet, Carlos M. Luis, Reynaldo Arenas, Ricardo Pau-Llosa, Juan A.Martinez and Armando Alvarez'Bravo, among others. He is a recipient of a Fellowship in Painting, 1984–1985 Cintas Foundation, NY and awarded an Individual Artist Fellowship, Painting, 1992–1993, Division of Cultural Affairs, State of Florida. In 1987 he obtain the Acquisition Prize, Second Florida Biennial Exhibition, Polk Museum of Art, Lakeland, FL. He participates in art panels and lectures on his work at museums and cultural institutions, including The National Gallery of Canada, Ottawa, Museo de Arte Contemporaneo, Panama City, Panama, Museo Nacional de Costa Rica, San Jose, Lowe art Museum, Miami, NSU Museum of Art Ft Lauderdale, FL, Ottawa School of Art, Canada, The Naples Art Museum, FL.

== References and external links ==
- Veigas, Jose (2004). Memoria: Artes Visuales Cubanas Del Siglo Xx (in Spanish). California International Arts Foundation. ISBN 978-0-917571-12-1.
- Veigas-Zamora, Jose; Cristina Vives Gutierrez, Adolfo V. Nodal, Valia Garzon, & Dannys Montes de Oca (2001). Memoria: Cuban Art of the 20th Century. California/International Arts Foundation. ISBN 0-917571-11-8.
- University of Buffalo website on the artist
- Clearwater, Bonnie; Jorge Hilker Santis, Helen L Kohen, Giulio V. Blanc, Juan A. Martinez (2014). The Miami Generation: Revisited. NSU Museum of Art Ft Lauderdale. ISBN 978-0-9905063-0-0.
- Bosch, Lynette M. F. (2004). Cuban-American Art in Miami. Exile, Identity and The Neo-Baroque. Lund Humphries. ISBN 0 85331 907 3.
