= César E. Trasobares =

Cuban-American artist (born 1949)

- Born: 1949 (age 76–77); Holguín, Cuba
- Occupation: Artist
- Known for: Collage, installation art, performance art

César E. Trasobares (born 1949 in Holguín, Cuba), is a Cuban-American artist working primarily in collage, installation, and performance art.

== Early life and career ==
Trasobares migrated from Cuba to the United States in 1965. From 1965 to 1996 he resided in Mexico and Miami. Since 1996 he has resided in New York City. In 1970 he acquired an Associate of Arts degree from Miami Dade Community College, in Miami, Florida. He later received a BA from Florida Atlantic University, Florida.

Cesar Trasobares served in curatorial and cultural leardership roles including coordinator position for the Estate Project for Artists with AIDS, in New York; and the directorship for the Metro-Dade's Art in Public Places Program, in South Florida.

== Exhibitions ==
=== Solo exhibitions ===
In 1978, he had an exhibition, New Paintings, in the Forma Gallery, Coral Gables, Florida. In 1979, he presented Rosata Quinceañera, Debutanta Glorificata in the Cayman Gallery, New York. In 1991, he exhibited Recent Rings and other Circles in the Barbara Gillman Gallery, Miami. In 1996, he presented Body of Work in the Ambrosino Gallery, Coral Gables, Florida.

=== Collective exhibitions ===
His work RINGHEAD (Exorcism from Style), a durational installation art project made of finger rings collected from 1983 to the present, was recently on view at the Bass Museum, Miami. In Trasobares words, this diverse collection of rings pay homage to fellow contemporary American artists such as Claes Oldenburg to Purvis Young.

In 1976, his work was seen at the 38th Annual Exhibition of Contemporary American Painting, at the Society of the Four Arts, in Palm Beach, Florida. In 1991 he was included in Collage Unglued show at the Center of Contemporary Art (COCA), Miami. In 1993 he participated in Southern Roots. South Florida Invitational at the Museum of Art, Fort Lauderdale. In 1995, he was one of the selected artists to display at To Collect, Conserve, Exhibit and Interpret the Visual Arts Produced by Artists of Cuban Heritage. The New Collection I at the Museo Cubano de Arte y Cultura, in Miami.

== Awards ==
Trasobares won the National Endowment for the Arts Fellowship, Washington, D.C., in 1979 and in 1980, he obtained the Cintas Foundation Fellowship for Art, 1980–81, New York City.

== Collections ==
His work can be found in collections such as the Pérez Art Museum Miami, Florida; Lowe Art Museum, University of Miami, Coral Gables, Allen Memorial Art Museum at Oberlin College, Ohio; the Miami Dade Public Library; and the Metropolitan Museum and Art Center, Coral Gables.
