= List of Cuban artists =

List of Cuban artists (in alphabetical order by last name) includes artists of various genres, who are notable and are either born in Cuba, of Cuban descent or who produced works that are primarily about Cuba.

== A ==
- Agustín Drake Aldama (1934–2022), metal sculptor, born in Matanzas
- Oscar Alfonso, (born 1952), painter, sculptor, born in Havana
- Edel Alvarez Galban (born 1967), visual artist, painter, born in Havana
- Nela Arias-Misson (1915–2015), Cuban-born American abstract, expressionist painter
- Pastor Argudín Pedroso (1880–1968), Afro-Cuban portrait painter from Havana
- Armando de Armas Romero (1914–1981), Havana painter
- Belkis Ayón (1967–1999), Havana painter and lithographer

== B ==
- Eduardo Muñoz Bachs (1937–2001), Spanish-born Cuban poster artist
- Henry Ballate (born 1966), artist, born in Aguada de Pasajeros
- Juan Pablo Ballester Carmenates (born 1966), photographer, video artist, born in Camagüey
- Dulce Beatriz (1931–2021), painter, born in Havana
- José Bedia Valdés (born 1959), painter, born in Havana
- Mario Bencomo (born 1953), painter, born in Pinar del Río
- Félix Alberto Beltrán Concepción (1938–2022), designer
- Cundo Bermúdez (1914–2008), Cuban-born American painter, born Havana
- José Bernal (1925–2010), Cuban-born American painter and sculptor
- Joaquín Blez Marcé (1886–1974), photographer
- Carlos Alberto Cruz Boix (born 1949), painter and sculptor
- Saidel Brito Lorenzo (born 1973), drawing, sculpture, installation, photography, born in Matanzas
- Adriano Buergo (born 1964), painting, drawing, installations

== C ==
- Camila Cabello (born 1997), singer
- F. Lennox Campello (born 1956), visual artist, art critic, art dealer, writer
- Agustín Cárdenas (1927–2001), sculptor
- Carlos Rodríguez Cárdenas (born 1962), painter
- Williams Carmona (born 1967), painter
- Maria Emilia Castagliola (born 1946), mixed-media artist
- Consuelo Castañeda (born 1958), painter
- Pedro Álvarez Castelló (1967–2004), Cuban-born American painter, lived in Tempe, Arizona
- Humberto Castro (born 1957), painter
- Hugo Consuegra (1929–2003), Cuban-born painter, lived in New York City
- Rafael Consuegra (1941–2021), sculptor and painter
- Raúl Cordero (born 1971), painter
- Raúl Corrales (1925–2006), photographer
- Miguel Cubiles (1937–2005), Cuban-born Mexican paintings, ceramics, and engravings, lived in Mexico City
- Liliam Cuenca (born 1944), painter

== D ==
- Demi (artist) (born 1955), Cuban-born American contemporary painter, active in Miami
- Ana Albertina Delgado Álvarez (born 1963), contemporary artist
- Idania Del Río (born 1981), designer
- Angel Delgado Fuentes (born 1965), visual artist
- Rolando López Dirube (1928–1997), Cuban-born Puerto Rican painter and sculptor
- Fernando Díaz Domínguez (1932–1983), painter

== E ==
- Ofill Echevarria (born 1972) Cuban-born American painter and multimedia artist, based in New York City
- Juan Francisco Elso (1956–1988) multidisciplinary artist
- Carlos Enríquez (1900–1957), painter
- Rosa Estebanez (1927–1991), Cuban-born American sculptor
- Carlos Estevez (born 1969), visual artist

== F ==
- Emilio Falero (born 1947), Cuban American painter
- Agustin Fernandez (1928–2006), Cuban-born American painter, sculptor, and multimedia artist
- Jesse A. Fernández (1925–1986), Cuban-born French artist, photographer, and photojournalist
- Teresita Fernández (born 1968), American artist of Cuban descent, known for public sculptures
- Miguel Fleitas, (born 1956), Cuban-born American visual artist, photographer, and film director
- Flora Fong (born 1949), Cuban painter and artist
- Jose Emilio Fuentes Fonseca, (born 1974), Cuban outsider artist
- Lourdes Gomez Franca (1933–c. 2018) Cuban-born American painter and poet, active in Miami

== G ==
- Humberto Jesús Castro García (born 1957), painter and printmaker
- Aimeé García Marrero (born 1972), painter and mixed media artist
- Carlos Rafael Uribazo Garrido (born 1951), multidisciplinary artist
- Enrique Gay García (1928–2015), Cuban-born American painter, and bronze sculptor
- Fernando Garcia (1945–1989), Cuban-American conceptual artist
- Erick Ginard (born 1979), internationally acclaimed Cuban designer
- Aaron "A.J." Gilbert (born 1979), American painter of Cuban descent, active in Brooklyn, New York
- Juan Ramón Valdés Gómez (born 1968), painter
- Jose Ramon Gonzalez Delgado (born 1953), painter and ceramicist
- Juan Gonzalez (1942–1993), Cuban-born American painter, active in New York City

== H ==
- Diango Hernández (born 1970), Cuban-born painter, active in Germany
- Jose Acosta Hernandez (born 1966) Cuban-born American, painter and sculptor
- Pedro Hernandez (born 1932) Cuban-born sculptor and multimedia artist
- Quisqueya Henríquez (born 1966), Cuban-born Dominican Republic multidisciplinary artist
- Carlos Enrique Prado Herrera (born 1978), sculptor and ceramist, active in New York City
- Mirta Cerra Herrera (1904–1986), painter
- Abel Herrero (born 1971), Cuban-born Italian multidisciplinary artist

== J ==
- Miguel Jorge (1928–1984), Cuban-born American painter and sculptor, lived in Coral Gables, Florida
- Josignacio (born 1963), contemporary painter, and creator of a plastic paint medium,

== K ==
- Alberto Korda (1928–2001), photographer, famous for his photograph of Che Guevara, lived in Paris

== L ==
- Tony Labat (born 1951), Cuban-born American conceptual artist working within video art, installation art, and sculpture
- Roger Aguilar Labrada (born 1947), painter, graphic designer, born in Pilon
- Wifredo Lam (1902–1982), Cuban-born painter, lived in Paris
- Julio Larraz (born 1944), painter, sculptor, political caricaturist, and cartoonist
- Vicente Dopico Lerner (1943–2020), painter
- Manuel Castellanos López (born 1949), graphic artist
- Pachy Lopez (born 1968), songwriter
- Rubén Torres Llorca (born 1957), painter

== M ==
- Luis Marin (artist) (born 1948), Neo-expressionist painter
- Armando Mariño (born 1968), painter and sculptor
- Juan T. Vázquez Martín (1941–2017), Cuban-born American painter, among the masters of abstract paintings in Cuba
- Raul Martinez (1927–1995) painter, designer, photographer, muralist, and graphic artist
- María Martínez-Cañas (born 1960), photographer
- Rene Mederos (1933–1996), poster artist and graphic designer
- Manuel Mendive (born 1944), painter, leading Afro-Cuban artist
- Eduardo Michaelsen (1920–2010), Cuban-born painter, he died in San Francisco, California
- José María Mijares (1921–2004), Cuban-born American painter, he lived in Miami, Florida
- Servando Cabrera Moreno (1923–1981), painter
- Enrique Caravia Montenegro (1905–1992), painter
- Osvaldo Yero Montero (born 1969), sculptor, born in Camagüey

== N ==
- Adriano Nicot (born 1964), painter
- Gilberto de la Nuez (1913–1993), outsider painter and woodcut maker

== O ==
- Pedro Pablo Oliva (born 1949), painter
- Pedro de Oraá (1931–2020), painter

== P ==
- Amelia Peláez (1896–1968), painter
- Gina Pellón (1926–2014), Cuban-born French painter, died Paris
- Mario Perez (born 1943), painter
- Dionisio Perkins (1929–2015), Cuban-born American painter, active in Florida
- Fidelio Ponce (1895–1949), painter
- Nelson Ponce Sánchez (born 1975), designer
- René Portocarrero (1912–1995), painter
- Herman Puig (1928–2021), photographer, died in Barcelona, Spain

== Q ==
- Roberto Juan Diago Querol (1920–1955), Cuban-born Spanish painter, photographer, died in Madrid
- Pablo Quert (born 1957), painter

== R ==
- Sandra Ramos (born 1969), Cuban-born American contemporary painter, printmaker, collagist, video and installation artist
- Teodoro Ramos Blanco (1902–1972), Afro-Cuban sculptor, educator
- Miguel Rodez (born 1956), Cuban-born American artist
- Arturo Rodríguez (born 1956), Cuban-born American painter, active in Miami
- Rocío Rodríguez (born 1952), Cuban-born abstract artist
- Edel Rodriguez (born 1971), Cuban-born American illustrator, children's book author
- Emilio Hector Rodriguez (born 1950), Cuban-born American abstract painter and photographer
- Juan Miguel Rodríguez de la Cruz (1902–1990), ceramic artist
- Manuel Rodulfo Tardo (1913–1998), sculptor and painter
- Alfredo Rostgaard (1943–2004), designer and poster artist
- Gilberto Ruiz Valdez (born 1950), artist

== S ==
- José Vilalta Saavedra (1865–1912), Cuban-born Italian sculptor, who died in Rome
- Baruj Salinas (1935–2024), painter
- Emilio Sánchez (1921–1999), Cuban-born American painter, active in New York City
- Tomás Sánchez (born 1948), painter, engraver
- Edgar Soberón (born 1962), Cuban-born American painter
- Loló Soldevilla (1901–1971), painter and sculptor
- Rafael Soriano (1920–2015), Cuban-born American painter, he died in Miami, Florida

== T ==
- Raúl Alfaro Torres (born 1933), painter and sculptor
- Mario Torroella (born 1935), painter
- César E. Trasobares (born 1949), collage and installation artist

== U ==
- Ramon Unzueta (1962–2012), painter, drawer, and illustrator

== V ==
- Hilda Vidal Valdés (born 1941), painter, drawer, designer, sculptor, collagist, and works in artistic tapestry, and papier mache
- Víctor Manuel García Valdés (1897–1969), painter
- José Lázaro Vázquez Xene (born 1968), artist
- Luis Vega De Castro (born 1944), painter and illustrator
- Fernando Velázquez Vigil (1950–2002), ceramic artist and painter
- José Manuel Villa Castillo (born 1939), graphic designer, scenographic designer, interior designer, drawer, illustrator, painter, and engraver
- Elio Villate (born 1957), painter
- Pedro Vizcaíno (born 1966), Cuban-born American painter, drawer, performance artist, and installation artist

== See also ==
- Cuban art
- List of Cuban painters
- List of Cuban women artists
- List of Latin American artists
- List of Cubans
