= List of Cuban women artists =

This is a list of women artists who were born in Cuba or whose artworks are closely associated with that country.

== A ==
- Yaquelin Abdala (born 1968), mixed media artist
- Astrid Alcayaga (born 1974), painter and mixed media artist
- Belkis Ayón (1967–1999), printmaker

== B ==
- María Brito (born 1947), Cuban-American painter, sculptor
- Tania Bruguera (born 1968), installation artist

== C ==
- María Magdalena Campos Pons (born 1959), Cuban-American multidisciplinary artist
- Maria Emilia Castagliola (born 1946), mixed-media artist
- Sandra Amelia Ceballos Obaya (born 1961), painter
- Mirta Cerra Herrera (1904–1986), painter
- Liliam Cuenca (born 1944), painter, engraver

== D ==
- Demi (artist) (born 1955), Cuban-born American contemporary painter
- Ana Albertina Delgado Álvarez (born 1963), painter, photographer, installation artist

== E ==
- Rosa Estebanez (1927–1991), Cuban-born American sculptor

== F ==
- Coco Fusco (born 1960), Cuban American interdisciplinary artist, writer, curator
- Lourdes Gomez Franca (1933–2018), Cuban–American painter, poet

== G ==
- María Elena González (born 1957), installation artist
- Aimeé García Marrero (born 1972), painter and mixed media artist

== H ==
- Quisqueya Henríquez (born 1966), Cuban-born Dominican Republic multidisciplinary artist

== J ==
- Martha Jiménez (active since 1971), sculptor, ceramist, painter

== L ==
- Rita Longa (1912–2000), sculptor
- Glenda León (born 1976), multidisciplinary artist
- Mary Stanley Low (1912–2007), British-Cuban political activist, surrealist poet, artist and Latin teacher

== M ==
- Ana Mendieta (1948-1985), interdisciplinary artist
- María Martínez-Cañas (born 1960), photographer
- Ruth González Mullen (1939–2009), painter

== P ==
- Gina Pellón (1926–2014), painter, based in France
- Marta María Pérez Bravo (born 1959), painter, photographer
- Amelia Peláez (1896–1968), painter

== R ==
- Lisandra Ramos (born 1987), multidisciplinary artist
- Sandra Ramos (born 1969), contemporary artist
- Lydia Rubio Ferrer (born 1946), contemporary artist

== S ==
- Zilia Sánchez Domínguez (1928–2024), painter, sculptor, scenographer

== T ==
- Gladys Triana (born 1937), Cuban-American visual artist

== V ==
- Julia Emilia Valdés Borrero (born 1952), painter, engraver
- Hilda Vidal Valdés (born 1941), multidisciplinary artist
- Lesbia Vent Dumois (born 1932), visual artist

== See also ==
- List of Cuban artists
- List of Cuban painters
