= Enrique Gay García =

Cuban-born American visual artist (1928–2015)

- Born: 1928; Santiago de Cuba, Cuba
- Died: November 17, 2015 (aged 86–87); Miami, Florida, United States
- Education: Escuela Nacional de Bellas Artes San Alejandro, Instituto Politécnico Nacional, University of Perugia
- Occupation: Visual artist
- Known for: Painting, printmaking, sculpture

Enrique Gay García (1928–2015) was a Cuban-born American visual artist. He worked in abstract expressionist painting and bronze sculpture.

== Biography ==
Enrique Gay García was born in 1928, in Santiago de Cuba, Cuba. Gay García graduated in 1953 from the Escuela Nacional de Bellas Artes San Alejandro in Havana. He also studied at Instituto Politécnico Nacional in Mexico City, Art Institute of Venice, and the University of Perugia in Perugia, Italy.

Gay García's artwork has been displayed in galleries at Miami Dade College in Miami; the Metropolitan Museum of Art in New York City; Havana; Washington, D.C.; and the San Carlos Institute in Key West, Florida. He participated in the São Paulo Art Biennial VI (1959) and VII (1963).

Gay García's work is included in museum and public collections, including the Lowe Art Museum at the University of Miami; the Museo Nacional de Bellas Artes in Havana; the Museum of Contemporary Latin American Art in Washington, D.C.; the Miami-Dade Public Library; and the Vermont Academy.

Gay García died at age 87 on November 17, 2015, after suffering from respiratory and cardiac problems for a few days prior.

== See also ==
- List of Cuban artists
