= Teodoro Ramos Blanco =

Afro-Cuban sculptor (1902–1972)

- Born: 1902; Havana, Cuba
- Died: 1972 (aged 69–70); Havana, Cuba
- Other names: Teodoro Ramos Blanco y Penita, Teodoro Ramos–Blanco
- Education: Academia Nacional de Bellas Artes San Alejandro
- Occupations: Sculptor, educator
- Years active: 1911–1970s
- Notable work: Inner Life (1934)
- Movement: Afrocubanismo

Teodoro Ramos Blanco (1902 – 1972) was an Afro–Cuban sculptor and educator. He primarily worked in wood, bronze, marble, and stone; and his work addresses racial issues, and Afro-Cuban themes. In the 1930s and 1940s, Ramos Blanco was the foremost Cuban figurative sculptor.

== Early life and education ==
Teodoro Ramos Blanco was born in 1902, in Havana, Cuba. He started making artwork at a young age.

He attended Academia Nacional de Bellas Artes San Alejandro in Havana and graduated in 1928, followed by study in Italy from 1928 until 1930.

== Career ==
Ramos Blanco won a gold medal for his artwork at the Ibero-American Exposition of 1929 in Seville, Spain. In 1930, he had an exhibition at Casa de España in Rome, Italy.

Langston Hughes wrote a profile on Ramos Blanco in November 1930, in the Opportunity: A Journal of Negro Life, and he was touted as an important figure in both Cuban art, and in art of the United States. Ramos Blanco also created a bust of Hughes titled, Head of Langston Hughes (c. 1930s). Many of his artworks were featured in The Crisis magazine.

Ramos Blanco was included in the seminal group art exhibition, Exhibition of the Work of Negro Artists (1933) at the Art Centre, New York City, hosted by the William E. Harmon Foundation. That same year, he had a solo exhibition with the William E. Harmon Foundation.

Ramos Blanco was awarded a prize at the American Negro Exposition (1940) in Chicago.

Ramos Blanco's portraits included a bust of Gen. Antonio Maceo (1941) a military leader in Cuban independence, which is housed at Howard University in Washington, D.C.; a public sculpture in Cuba of Mariana Grajales Cuello (1928), a Cuban independence and women's rights activist; a public sculpture in Baltimore, Maryland of José Martí (1959), a Cuban independence activist; public sculpture in Havana of Cuban poet Placido (born as Gabriel de la Concepción Valdés),; a monumental statue in Port-au-Prince of Henri Christophe (1954), a key leader in the Haitian Revolution; and of Alexandre Sabès Pétion, who was the first president of the Republic of Haiti.

His work was included in the group exhibition, The Latin-American Collection of the Museum of Modern Art (1943), at the Museum of Modern Art in New York City.

Starting around 1944, Ramos Blanco taught sculpture at the Academia Nacional de Bellas Artes San Alejandro.

== Death and legacy ==
Ramos Blanco died in 1972, in Havana.

His work has been in museum collections, including at the former Riverside Museum, and at the Museum of Modern Art. His artist files can be found at the Frick Art Research Library, the Smithsonian American Art and Portrait Gallery Library, and the Schomburg Center for Research in Black Culture.

The Galería Teodoro Ramos Blanco in Havana bears his name.

== List of works ==
Date	Title	Materials	Location	Notes
1911	Sitting Man (Spanish: Hombre Sentado)	bronze, onyx base		
1928	Maternal Heroism (Spanish: Heroísmo Maternal), monument of Mariana Grajales Cuello	bronze	Havana, Cuba	in Vedado neighborhood
c. 1930	Head of Langston Hughes	bronze	New York City, US	at the Schomburg Center for Research in Black Culture
c. 1934	Tomb for Juan Gualberto Gomez	stone	Havana, Cuba	
1934	Inner Life (Spanish: Vida Interior)	white marble	Havana, Cuba	Museo Nacional de Bellas Artes de La Habana
1937	Head of Black Woman (Spanish: Cabeza de Negra)	wood		
1939	Old Black Woman (Spanish: Mujer Negra Mayor)	acana wood	New York City, US	part of the Museum of Modern Art
1941	Bust of Gen. Antonio Maceo	bronze	Howard University	
1943	Bust of José Martí	stone	Sancti Spíritus, Cuba	at Provincial Library (Biblioteca Provincial)
1948	Honor to Mothers of the World (Spanish: Honor a las Madres del Mundo)	limestone, marble base	Tampa, Florida, US	
1950	Mother and Son (Spanish: Madre e Hijo)	stone	Havana, Cuba	at Leonor Perez Cabrera Maternity Center, Old Havana neighborhood
c. 1954	Monument to Henri Christophe	broze	Port-au-Prince, Haiti	in Champ de Mars park
1959	Monument to José Martí	bronze	Baltimore, Maryland, US	erected in 1998, at intersection of North Broadway and East Fayette Street
	Monument to Placido (Gabriel de la Concepción Valdés)	stone	Havana, Cuba	in Parque del Cristo
	Antonio Guiteras	bronze		
	Jean-Jacques Dessalines	bronze		
	Alexandre Sabès Pétion	bronze		

== See also ==
- List of Cuban artists
