= Luis Vega =

Luis Vega may refer to:

- Little Louie Vega (born 1965), American DJ, record producer and remixer
- Luis Vega Torres (born 1998), Cuban swimmer
- Luis Calderón Vega (1911–1989), Mexican politician and writer
- Luis Vega (mathematician) (born 1960), Spanish mathematician
- Luis de Vega, 16th-century Spanish architect
- Luis Lasso de la Vega, 17th-century Mexican priest and lawyer
- Luis Vega De Castro (born 1944), Cuban artist
- Luis Vega Ramos (born 1970), Puerto Rican lawyer and politician
- Luis Vega (footballer) (born 2002), Honduran footballer
