= Eduardo Muñoz Bachs =

Cuban poster artist and comics artist

- Born: 12 April 1937; Valencia, Spain
- Died: 22 July 2001 (aged 64); Havana, Cuba
- Known for: Poster

Eduardo Muñoz Bachs (1937–2001) was a Spanish-Cuban poster artist and comics artist.

== Biography ==
He was born on April 12, 1937, in Valencia, Spain, son of María Bachs Fornés (1911–1987) and Eduardo Muñoz Nicart (1912–1963), son of journalist Eduardo Muñoz García (1863-1915). The family went into exile in Cuba with his parents in 1941. His aunt, the writer Matilde Muñoz Barberi (1895-1954), joined them in 1945. He grew up and spent his entire artistic life in Cuba.

In 1960, with no formal training in graphic design, he made the first poster for the Instituto Cubano de Arte e Industria Cinematograficos (ICAIC) that was founded shortly after the Cuban Revolution to produce and promote Cuban films.

The association with ICAIC lasted for a lifetime, and Bachs made over 2,000 movie posters for the institution. In his posters, the human figure, the face, or the entire body, are predominant and recurrent. Although colors are eye-catching and wide-ranging, they are never shocking. The drawing with childish and comic features and hand-made calligraphy define a large part of Muñoz Bach's poster for the ICAIC, creating a unique style within the Cuban poster design of the half of the 20th century and serving as inspiration to notable contemporary Cuban poster artists such as Fabián Muñoz, Nelson Ponce and Erick Ginard.

He is counted among the greatest Cuban poster designers - many times nicknamed The Cuban Poster Master of All Time -. His work contributed like no other to the international admiration that colorful Cuban posters enjoyed in the 1970s.

Muñoz Bach's work also included animation and children's books illustration, illustrating more than fifty texts throughout his life for renowned Cuban authors such as Dora Alonso. In his role as an illustrator of children's books, he breathes a dose of naivety, fused with light-hearted humor and intelligent satire. Muñoz Bach himself expressed: "Illustrating a children's notebook represents an artistic liberation that demands an overflow of ideas from me; He invites me to equate myself with the boy's fantasy". With reference to his pictorial work, he was never considered an artist in the conventional sense. On more than one occasion he said he painted to be distracted. However, he produced oil works, in ink and acrylic that, as in its posters, prioritize the figurative with high doses of fantasy and lyricism.

He also ventured into the world of comic strips. With scripts by Félix Guerra, Bachs made several comic series for Editorial Pablo de la Torriente in the 1980s, most notably El Cuento, a collection of ironic fables.

His foundational and majestic work was recorded in the documentary memory of the film El cine y yo, by Cuban director Mayra Vilasís.

He died at 64, on 22 July 2001 in Havana, Cuba due to a heart attack.

== See also ==
- Cuban art
- List of Cuban artists
- List of Cuban films
