= Jesse A. Fernández =

Cuban artist, photographer

- Born: December 7, 1925; Havana, Cuba
- Died: March 13, 1986 (aged 60); Paris, France
- Occupations: Artist; Photographer
- Years active: 1945-1980

Jesse A. Fernández (December 7, 1925 – March 13, 1986) was a Cuban artist, photographer, and photojournalist. He was an art director of Visión Magazine in New York City and a photographer for the Revolución newspaper in Havana, Cuba. Fernández was granted the Cintas Foundation Fellowship for painting in 1967 and 1975.

Born in Cuba, Fernández grew up in Spain. He studied electronic engineering in Philadelphia and began painting in 1945. He moved New York City in 1947 where he became part of the art scene before travelling to Medellin, Colombia in 1952 where he photographing Native Americans in Guajira for four months. In 1957, he took part as a photographer in the filming of Nazarín de Luis Buñuel in Mexico. His photographs were published in Life, Esquire, Paris Match, Jours of France, Pageant, Cosmopolitan, Evergreen Review, Time Magazine, The New York Times, and the Herald Tribune. In 1958, he accepted the artistic director position for Visión magazine. Fernández also worked as a photographer for the Revolución newspaper and its weekly magazine, the Lunes of Revolución. In 1960, he returned to New York City started painting again and began, teaching at the School Visual Arts. In 1969, he started to alternate his work in New York with stays in San Juan, Puerto Rico. During this period he wrote as an art critic for several publications. Fernández exhibited at the D’Arcy Gallery of New York, the El Morro gallery in San Juan, the museum of the University of Puerto Rico, and at the Alliance Française and Botello gallery in San Juan. In the late 1970s and early 1980s he took part in several exhibitions, in Basel, Madrid, Paris, and Caracas, Venezuela. Fernández died in 1987. His work is held in several collections. In 2003, the Reina Sofia in Madrid did a retrospective of his work.

== Biography ==
Jesse Antonio Fernández was born in Havana, Cuba on December 7, 1925. He and his family moved to Asturias, Spain in the late 1920s to escape the repressive leadership of Cuban leader Gerardo Machado. They returned to Cuba in December 1936 to escape the Spanish Civil War. In 1942, Fernández left for Philadelphia to study electronic engineering. In 1945, he returned to Cuba, and devoted himself to painting. In 1947, Fernández returned the United States, settling in New York City. He registered with the Art Students League, where he studied painting with George Grosz and Preston Dickinson. In 1948, Fernández met painter Wifredo Lam, who introduced him to several European painters living in New York City at the time, including Marcel Duchamp and Esteban Francés. In 1949, Fernández's daughter Yolanda was born in New York City. In 1952, Fernández travelled to Medellin, Colombia, where he was influenced to begin studying photography. In 1954, Fernández worked for Propaganda Epoca, a Colombian advertising agency, where he met Fernando Botero and Gabriel Garcia Márquez.

In 1955, Fernández travelled the Amazonian area of El Atrato, studying archaeology and ethnology. After photographing Native Americans in Guajira for four months, he returned to New York City, where he sold many of the photographs he had taken in South America. In 1957, he took part as a photographer in the filming of Nazarín de Luis Buñuel in Mexico. His photographs were published in Life, Esquire, Paris Match, Jours of France, Pageant, Cosmopolitan, Evergreen Review, Time Magazine, The New York Times, and the Herald Tribune. In 1958, Fernández accepted the artistic director position for Visión magazine, for which he traveled to Ecuador, Mexico, and Central America. He also worked as a photographer for the Revolución newspaper and its weekly magazine, the Lunes of Revolución, photographing writers, musicians, and artists, including José Lezama Lima and Ernest Hemingway. During this time period he traveled to Havana on a yearly basis to see his family. During one of these trips, he wrote a report on the artistic life of Cuba for Life Magazine. In 1960, he returned to New York City and temporarily gave up photography to devote himself to painting, teaching at the School Visual Arts. He lived in the “Village”, regularly meeting with Jorge Luis Borges, Aldous Huxley, Joan Miró, Antoni Tàpies, and Antonio Will. In 1961, his work was exhibited at the D’Arcy Gallery of New York.

In 1969, he started to alternate his work in New York with stays in San Juan, Puerto Rico, in search of an environment more favorable to creation. During this period he wrote as an art critic for several publications, including the San Juan Star, Opus International, and Knowledge of Arts. From 1971 to 1973, his works were exhibited at the El Morro gallery in San Juan, the museum of the University of Puerto Rico, and at the Alliance Fran1caise and Botello gallery in San Juan. Between 1974 and 1976, he lived in the Spanish cities of Toledo and Madrid. In the late 1970s and early 1980s he took part in several exhibitions, including the Basel Art Fair 76, one at the Ynguanzo gallery of Madrid, “One Jackson Pollock” at the American Arts center of Paris, “Siete Años” at the Theo gallery of Madrid, one at the American Arts center of Madrid, and another at the Museum of Contemporary art in Caracas, Venezuela.

He died in Paris, France, on March 13, 1986.

== Legacy ==
Fernández's work was included in Caras y máscaras, exhibited at Galería 8 in 1983 and at Miami Dade Community College in 1988. In 1993, Cintas Fellows Revisited: A Decade After was shown at the Main Library of the Metro Dade Cultural Center in Miami, Florida. The same year, his work was included in Photography by Cintas Fellows, which was exhibited at The Art Museum of the Florida International University in Miami.

In 2003, the National Museum of Art Reina Sofia in Madrid held a retrospective of his photographs, drawings, and cajas (boxes) from June to September. Archives of his works are kept by the Cuban Office of Historical Matters in Havana and the Cintas Foundation in New York.

== See also ==
- List of Cuban artists
