= Julia Emilia Valdés Borrero =

Cuban artist

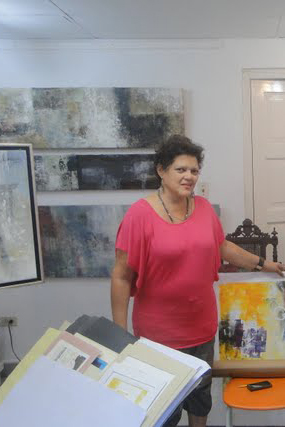
- Born: February 26, 1952; Santiago de Cuba, Cuba
- Occupation: Artist

Julia Emilia Valdés Borrero (born February 26, 1952, in Santiago de Cuba, Cuba) is a Cuban artist specializing in painting, drawing, engraving, and illustration.

From 1967 to 1972, she studied in the Escuela Nacional de Arte (ENA), in Havana, Cuba. Between 1984 and 1989 she studied art history at the Universidad de Oriente in Santiago de Cuba.

== Individual exhibitions ==
Between 1982 and 1998, she presented several solo exhibitions, both in Cuba and in Europe.

- 1982: Músicos y Palmas, Havana
- 1989: Exposition Peintures de Choy, Julia Valdés, Manuel Pozo, Bordeaux, France
- 1993: Paintings. Julia Valdés/Alberto Lescay, Berlin, Germany
- 1996: Día Imaginario. Julia Valdés Borrero, Havana
- 1998: De máscaras y otras imágenes. Julia Valdés, Santiago de Cuba

== Collective exhibitions ==
- 1992: De otra isla. Muesta colectiva de pintores cubanos, Santo Domingo, Dominican Republic
- 1993: Neve Cubanische Malerel (Six Cuban Fine Artists), Speyer, Germany
- 1994: Arte de Cuba, Barcelona, Spain
- 1995: 1er. Salón de Arte Cubano Contemporáneo, Havana

== Awards ==
- 1973: Prize at the Salón Nacional de Profesores e Instructores de Artes Plásticas, Museo Nacional de Bellas Artes, Havana
- 1979: Prize in the Concurso Nacional de Vitrales, for the Consejo de Estado, Havana
- 1980: Prize in Painting, at the VIII Salón Nacional Juvenil de Artes Plásticas, Museo Nacional de Bellas Artes, Havana
- 1981: First Prize in Drawing, in the Salón Homenaje al 467 Aniversario de la Fundación de la Ciudad, Galería Oriente, Santiago de Cuba
- 1989: Prize in Illustration, in the Concurso Nacional "El Arte del Libro" [for illustrations of the book Cuentos de la vida y la muerte], Havana

== Collections ==
- Galería Propuesta, Santo Domingo, Dominican Republic
- Galerie Kisch, Berlin, Germany
- Museo Emilio Bacardí, Santiago de Cuba
- Museo Nacional de Bellas Artes de La Habana, Havana
- Galerie Wünsch, Linz, Austria
