= Humberto Castro =

Cuban painter (born 1957)

Humberto Jesús Castro García
- Born: July 9, 1957 (age 69); Havana, Cuba
- Education: Escuela Nacional de Bellas Artes "San Alejandro"; Instituto Superior de Arte
- Known for: Painting; printmaking
- Awards: Primer Premio en Grabado, Primer Salón Nacional de Pequeño Formato (1981); Premio Encuentro de Grabado '83 (1983); Engraving First Prize, I Trienal Internacional de Arte contra la Guerra (1984); Award, VII Bienal de San Juan del Grabado Latinoamericano y del Caribe (1986); First Prize "Toison d'Or", Cannes (1994)

Humberto Jesús Castro García (born July 9, 1957) is a Cuban painter.

He studied at the Escuela Nacional de Bellas Artes "San Alejandro" and at the Instituto Superior de Arte (ISA) in Havana, Cuba. In 1980 he became part of the Taller Experimental de Gráfica (TEG), Havana, and from 1982 until 1985 he was also member of the Equipo de Creación Colectiva Hexágono, Havana.

== Individual exhibitions ==
'"Hallazgos"', in 1980, was his first individual exhibition and it took place at Teatro Mella, Havana, Cuba. In 1988 "Three Cuban Artists" in Gallery 76, Ontario College of Art/Forest City Gallery, Toronto, Ontario, Canada. Three years after this experience in North America "Humberto Castro. Jeune Peinture", Grand Palais, Paris, France. In 1993 "Humberto Castro. L'envol d'Icare". Le Monde de L'Art, Paris, France and Art 93 Chicago. The New Pier Show, Chicago, Illinois, USA. In 1995 "Le Radeau d'Ulyses". Le Monde de L'Art, París, France and "Humberto Castro. Nuevos trabajos". Galería Corine Timsit, San Juan, Puerto Rico . In 1997 "Mariano y Humberto Castro". Pan American Art Gallery, Dallas, Texas, USA.

== Collectives exhibitions ==
Among his collective exhibitions there is a special one in 1975 that took place at Escuela Nacional de Bellas Artes "San Alejandro", Havana. In 1983 15th International Biennial of Graphic Art, Museum of Modern Art (Moderna Galerija), Ljubljana, Slovenia. In 1984 Eighth British International Print Biennale. Cartwright Hall, Lister Park Bradford, Bradford, United Kingdom, 1st Havana Biennial, Bienal de La Habana. Museo Nacional de Bellas Artes de La Habana, Havana, Cuba. In 1986 VII Bienal de San Juan del Grabado Latinoamericano y del Caribe. Arsenal de la Marina, San Juan, Puerto Rico, and in 1989 9 Norwegian International Print Triennale Fredrikstad [from August 10 until October 8]. Fredrikstad Bibliotek, Fredrikstad, Norway. In 1991 42é Salon de la Jeune Peinture. Grand Palais, Paris, France, and 4th Havana Biennial Bienal de La Habana. Museo Nacional de Bellas Artes de La Habana, Havana. And in 2000 "La gente en casa". Contemporary collection. 7th Havana Biennial Bienal de La Habana. Museo Nacional de Bellas Artes, Havana, CUBA.

== Awards ==
In 1981 he received the award Primer Premio en Grabado. Primer Salón Nacional de Pequeño Formato, Salón Lalo Carrasco, Hotel Habana Libre. In 1983 Premio Encuentro de Grabado'83. Sala Tespis, Hotel Habana Libre, Havana. On 1984 Engraving First Prize. I Trienal Internacional de Arte contra la Guerra, Museo Estatal de Majdanek, Lublin, Poland. In 1986 Award. VII Bienal de San Juan del Grabado Latinoamericano y del Caribe, Arsenal de la Marina, San Juan, Puerto Rico and finally in 1994 First Prize "Toison d'Or", Cannes, France.

== Collections ==
- Ambrosino Gallery's collection, Miami, Florida
- Centro de Arte Euro Americano, Caracas, Venezuela
- Fondo Cubano de Bienes Culturales, Havana, Cuba
- Galerie Le Monde de L'Art, Paris, France
- Galerie Akié Aricchi, Paris, France
- Museo de la Villa de Capo de Orlando, Sicily, Italy
- São Paulo Museum of Art, São Paulo, Brazil
- Museo de Arte Latinoamericano, Managua, Nicaragua
- Museo Estatal de Majdaneck, Lublin, Poland
- Museo Nacional de Bellas Artes de La Habana, Havana, Cuba
- Museum of Art Fort Lauderdale, Fort Lauderdale, Florida
- Kendall Art Center, Miami, Florida
