= Joaquín Blez =

Cuban photographer (1886–1974)

- Born: December 5, 1886; Santiago de Cuba, Cuba
- Died: April 7, 1974 (aged 87); Havana, Cuba

Joaquín Blez Marcé (December 5, 1886 – April 7, 1974) was a Cuban photographer.

== Biography ==
Born in Santiago de Cuba, Cuba, Blez studied between 1904 and 1907 at Antonio Desquirón's photography workshop in Santiago de Cuba, and in 1922 attended the Escuela Laboratorio de Fotografía. He worked with Rodolfo Namias in Milan, Italy and in the later 1920s took lessons at the Internationale Lichbild Ausstellung in Berlin, Germany. In 1937 and 1938 he studied photographic technique and illumination in Hollywood, California.

In 1939 Blez presented his first personal exhibition, Fotografías de Joaquín Blez, at an exposition at the Palacio Municipal in Havana. During 1987 his work was exhibited at Museo Nacional de Bellas Artes de La Habana as Crónica de un Estudio. Fotografías de Joaquín Blez.

Blez participated in many collective exhibitions, including the first Salón Nacional de Fotografía by the Asociación de Pintores y Escultores in Havana and, in 1934, at the International Exposition on Photography in Berlin. In 1947 he was invited to the Pictorial Photographers of America at the American Museum of Natural History in New York. In 1983 his work featured in La Fotografía en Cuba. Exposición Retrospectiva at the Museo Nacional de Bellas Artes de La Habana. In 1987, he also participated in Sicof'87. Sezione Culturale at the Palazzo Cisi in Milan, and four years later in 1841-1991: El tiempo y su imagen at Fototeca de Cuba, Havana. In 1998 his work featured in the Cuba: 100 años de fotografía exhibition at the Casa de América in Madrid, Spain.

In 1923 Blez received the gold medal at the Gran Certamen Popular Cubano Industrial y Mercantil from newspaper El Mundo in Havana.

His works can be found in permanent collections of Fototeca de Cuba and at the Museo Nacional de Bellas Artes de La Habana.
