= Enrique Caravia Montenegro =

Cuban artist (1905–1992)

- Born: March 13, 1905; Havana, Cuba
- Died: December 24, 1992 (aged 87); Havana, Cuba
- Occupation: Artist

Enrique Caravia Montenegro (born March 13, 1905, in Havana, Cuba; died December 24, 1992, in Havana) was a Cuban artist.

== Education ==
In the 1920s he studied in the Arts and Trades School, Sociedad Amigos del País Villate Academy Escuela de Bellas Artes de San Alejandro in Havana. Later, he continued his education at Escuela de Bellas Artes in Rome, Italy.

== Individual exhibitions ==
Among his solo exhibitions was one in 1933 at the Lyceum of Havana. In 1987 his Grabados de Enrique Caravia Montenegro exhibit was displayed at the Museo Histórico de Plaza, Havana. In 1990 his work was exhibited in the transitory room at Escuela de Artes Plásticas San Alejandro, Havana, Cuba.

== Collective exhibitions ==
One of his collective exhibitions was "Primer Salón de Humoristas" in 1921 at the Academia de Ciencias de Cuba, Havana. In 1951, he participated in the first Bienal Hispanoamericana de Arte de Madrid and in "Exposición Bienal Hispano Americana de Arte" at the Instituto Cultural Cubano Español, Havana. In 1954, he presented some works in the second Bienal Hispanoamericana de Arte at the Museo Nacional de Bellas Artes, Havana and in 1996 Estampas cubanas de tres siglos was shown at the Museo Nacional de Colombia, Bogotá and at the Salón Avianca, Barranquilla, Colombia.

== Awards ==
One of his most important awards was a first prize at the 1929 Exposición Iberoamericana de Sevilla, Spain. In 1936, he won the silver medal at the XVIII Salón de Bellas Artes, Círculo de Bellas Artes, Havana and in 1939, he won the bronze medal at the XXI Salón de Bellas Artes. In 1944, he won the gold medal at the XXVI Salón de Bellas Artes, Círculo de Bellas Artes in Havana, and in 1955 Golden medal at the XXXVII Salón de Bellas Artes, Círculo de Bellas Artes.

== Collections ==
His work is included in collections at the National Archive, Havana; International Business Machines Corporation, USA; Museo de Ciencias Carlos Juan Finlay, Havana; Museo de la Ciudad, Palacio de los Capitanes Generales, Havana; and the Museo Nacional de Bellas Artes de La Habana.
