= Armando de Armas Romero =

Cuban painter (1914–1981)

- Born: November 27, 1914; Havana, Cuba
- Died: May 25, 1981 (aged 66); Havana, Cuba
- Occupation: Painter

Armando de Armas Romero (November 27, 1914 – May 25, 1981) was a Cuban painter.

De Armas studied between 1957 and 1959 at the Escuela de Artes y Oficios in Havana, Cuba; but is considered a self-taught artist. Between 1930 and 1950 he worked as postal employee, construction worker and trader in Havana, Cuba. He was also a scenographer with Manolo Roig of the Teatro Martí, Havana, Cuba between 1957 and 1959.

== Individual exhibitions ==
- 1975 - "Exposición de Paisajes de Armando de Armas" at the Galería de La Rampa, Hotel Habana Libre, Havana, Cuba
- 1978 - "Paisajes Cubanos del Pintor Armando de Armas", at the Casa de la Cultura de Plaza, Havana, Cuba.

== Collective exhibitions ==
- 1972 - "III Trienal de Arte Insito (Naif)" at the Slovak National Gallery in Bratislava, Czechoslovakia
- 1972–1973 - "8 Primitive Painters", Copenhagen, Denmark; Belgrade, Yugoslavia; Prague, Czechoslovakia; Warsaw, Poland; Pushkin Museum, Moscow, Russia; Szépmúvészeti Museum, Budapest, Hungary; Bucharest, Romania; and Sofia, Bulgaria.
- 1976 - "Eleven Cuban Primitive Artist"; Expo de Jamaica, Kingston, Jamaica
- 1978 - "11 Pintores Ingenuos de Cuba" at the Palacio de Bellas Artes in Mexico City, Mexico
- 1982 - "Artistas Populares de Cuba" in Museo Nacional de Bellas Artes de La Habana

== Collections ==
His works can be found in the permanent collection of Museo Nacional de Bellas Artes de La Habana, Cuba.
