= Raúl Alfaro Torres =

Cuban artist

Raúl Marcelino Alfaro Torres
- Born: June 10, 1933 (age 91); Santiago de Cuba, Cuba

Raúl Marcelino Alfaro Torres (born June 10, 1933) is a Cuban artist specializing in engraving, photography, sculpture, drawing, painting and graphic design.

Alfaro graduated from the "Escuela Provincial de Artes Plásticas José Joaquín Tejada", in Santiago de Cuba in 1952. He later studied arts and graphic design from 1957 to 1958 at the School of Visual Arts/American Art School in New York City.

== Individual exhibitions ==
- 1965 – "Alfaro. Grabados y Dibujos", Galería de Oriente, Santiago de Cuba
- 1965 – "Pintores y Grabadores de Santiago. Aguilera y Alfaro". Centro de Arte Internacional, in Havana
- Galería Espacio Abierto, Revista Revolución y Cultura, Havana, Cuba
- "Exposición del Mtro. Raúl Alfaro Torres. Colografías" Havana, Cuba
- Galería de la Casa Makuixóchitl, Ocotepec, Mexico

== Collective exhibitions ==
- 1963 – "Salón Nacional de Grabado 1963", Museo Nacional de Bellas Artes de La Habana
- 1964 – "Tercer Concurso Latinoamericano de Grabado", Galería Latinoamericana, Casa de las Américas (Havana)
- 1982 – "Pintores Santiagueros de Cuba", Galería Tierra Adentro 2, Mexico City, Mexico.

== Awards ==
- 1963 – Acquisition Award. Salón Nacional de Grabado 1963, Museo Nacional de Bellas Artes de La Habana
- 1970 – Acquisition Award. "Salón 70", Museo Nacional de Bellas Artes de La Habana
- 1976 – First Prize in Engraving; Primer Salón del Nuevo Paisaje, Santiago de Cuba

== Collections ==
His works are part of the permanent collections:

- Museo Bacardí in Santiago de Cuba
- Museo Nacional de Bellas Artes de La Habana
