= Sandra Amelia Ceballos Obaya =

Cuban artist (born 1961)

Sandra Amelia Ceballos Obaya (born March 21, 1961, in Guantánamo, Cuba) is a Cuban artist.

== Exhibitions ==
=== Individual ===
She has had many exhibitions, including:

- "Diálogo de Sandra y Manuel Vidal" in Galería L, Havana. (1985)
- "Special de Sandra y su marido" in Galería de Arte Domingo Ravenet. (1993)
- "La Expresión sicógena". and New Art from Cuba: Utopian Territories in Access Gallery, Vancouver, Canada. (1997)
- "Mansas porciones" in Espacio Aglutinador, Havana, Cuba. (1998)

=== Collective ===
She was part of many collective exhibitions, including:

- I Bienal de Pintura Jaume Guasch. Fundació Jaume Guasch, Barcelona, Spain (1984)
- VIII Bienal Iberoamericana de Arte Domecq. "América nuestro Continente". Instituto Cultural Domecq, Mexico, D.F. (1992)
- 1e Internationale Grafiek Biennale. Maastricht Exhibition and Congress Centre (MECC), Maastricht, Holland (1993)
- "Una brecha entre el cielo y la tierra". fifth Bienal de La Habana. Centro Provincial de Artes Plásticas y Diseño, Havana, Cuba (1994)
- V Bienal Internacional de Pintura de Cuenca. Museo Municipal de Arte Moderno, Cuenca, Ecuador, (1996)

== Recognition ==
She has been granted many awards. Among them are:

- Mention of Painting. Salón Playa ’85, Galería de Arte Servando Cabrera Moreno, Havana. (1985)
- First Prize. Premio Nacional Anual de Pintura Contemporánea Juan Francisco Elso, Museo Nacional de Bellas Artes, Havana, Cuba.(1995)
- 1990s Art from Cuba: A National Residency and Exhibition Program. Art in General and Longwood Art Project/Bronx Council on the Arts, New York City. (1997)
- Title Residence in the Design and Films Institute, Switzerland. (1998)

== Collections ==
Her works can be found in collections such as:

- The Center for Cuban Studies, New York City.
- The Museo de Arte Moderno, Michoacán, Morelia, Mexico.
- The Museo Nacional de Bellas Artes, Havana, Cuba, and in
- The Museo Universitario del Chopo, México, D.F., Mexico.
