= Lowe Art Museum =

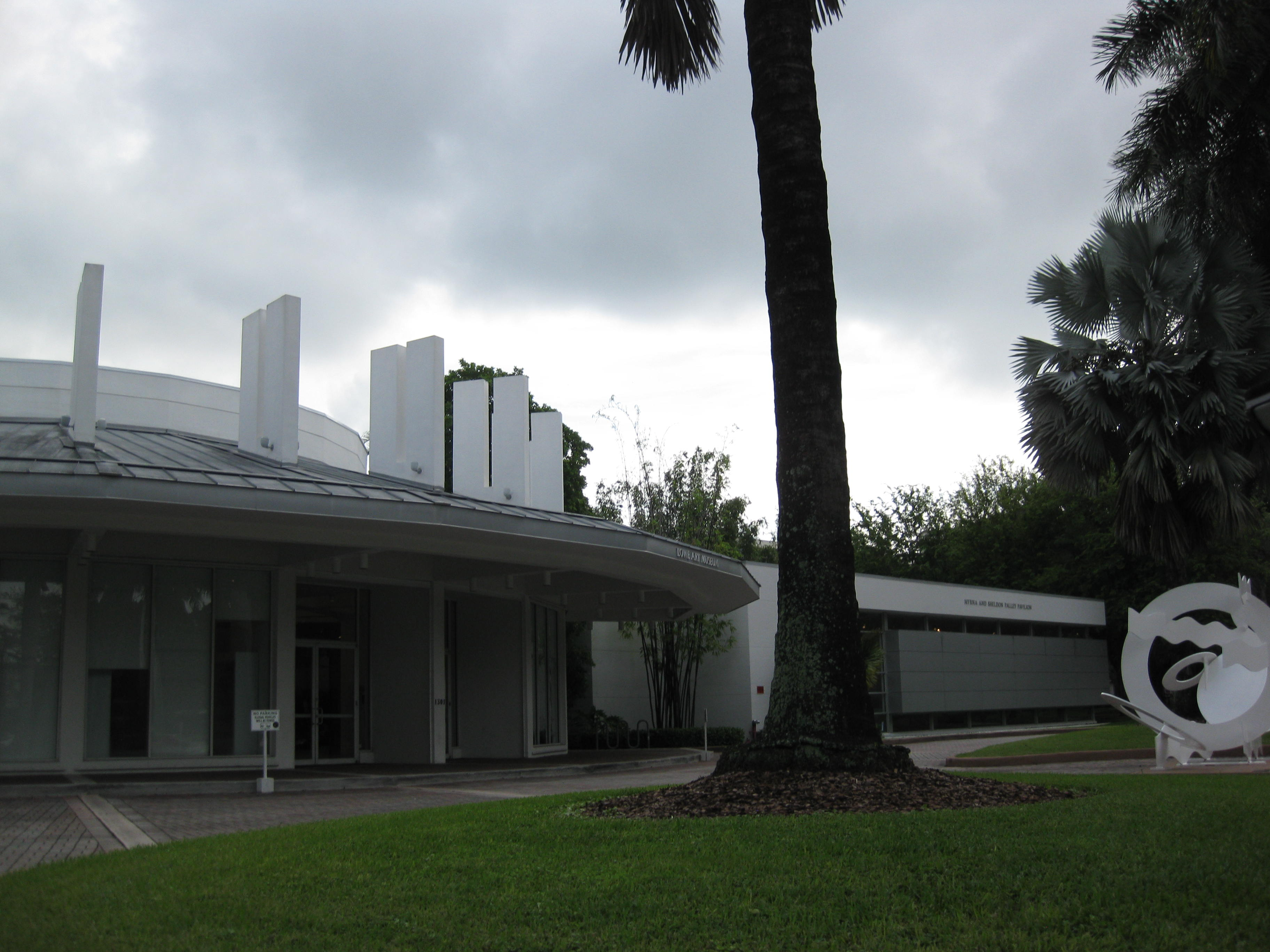
- Lowe Art Museum on the University of Miami campus in October 2015

- Location within Miami Location within Florida Location within the United States
- Established: 1950
- Location: University of Miami; 1301 Stanford Drive; Coral Gables, Florida, U.S.
- Coordinates: 25.719425°N 80.275657°W
- Type: Visual arts museum
- Visitors: 41,000
- Director: Jill Deupi
- Curator: Jill Deupi
- Public transit access: Metrorail access via University station
- Website: www.lowe.miami.edu

The Lowe Art Museum is the art museum of the University of Miami in Coral Gables, Florida. The museum is located on the campus of the University of Miami and is accessible by Miami Metrorail at University Station.

Lowe Art Museum's comprehensive collection comprises more than 19,250 objects, which collectively represent more than 5,000 years of human creativity on every inhabited continent. The collection is divided into 14 thematic rooms with each room dedicated to a theme or artistic current in the collection. In addition to its 14 rooms, the museum includes the Palley Pavilion, which is dedicated to the museum's glass collection, and an outdoor garden, which includes contemporary art sculptures.

== History ==
Lowe Art Museum at the University of Miami opened on February 22, 1950. The museum was originally established by a gift from philanthropists Joe and Emily Lowe. At the time of its opening, the museum was the first art museum in South Florida.

In 1951, Miami philanthropists Joe and Emily Lowe underwrote construction of a stand-alone facility on the University of Miami campus to absorb the gallery's rapidly growing collections. The new Lowe Art Gallery was dedicated on February 4, 1952. Four years later, in 1956, Alfred I. Barton donated his extensive collection of Native American art to Lowe, which was accommodated in a 1,300 square-foot purpose-built addition.

In 1961, Lowe Art Gallery was selected as a repository for 43 works from the Samuel H. Kress Collection of European Renaissance and Baroque art, which was housed in a new wing built specifically for it.

In 1968, Lowe Art Gallery was renamed the Lowe Art Museum. In 1972, it was the first museum in Miami-Dade County to be professionally accredited by American Alliance of Museums.

In 1985, Lowe was recognized by the State of Florida as a major cultural institution, the first museum in Miami-Dade County to receive this designation.

In 1991, as a result of Lowe's continued art acquisitions (primarily through gift acceptances), the museum underwent a major expansion. Miami architect Charles Harrison Pawley was selected for this project, which added 13,000 additional square feet of temporary and permanent exhibition gallery space to the museum, bringing its total footprint to over 36,000 square feet. This expansion also addressed Lowe's need for new HVAC, security, and fire protection systems.

== Holdings ==
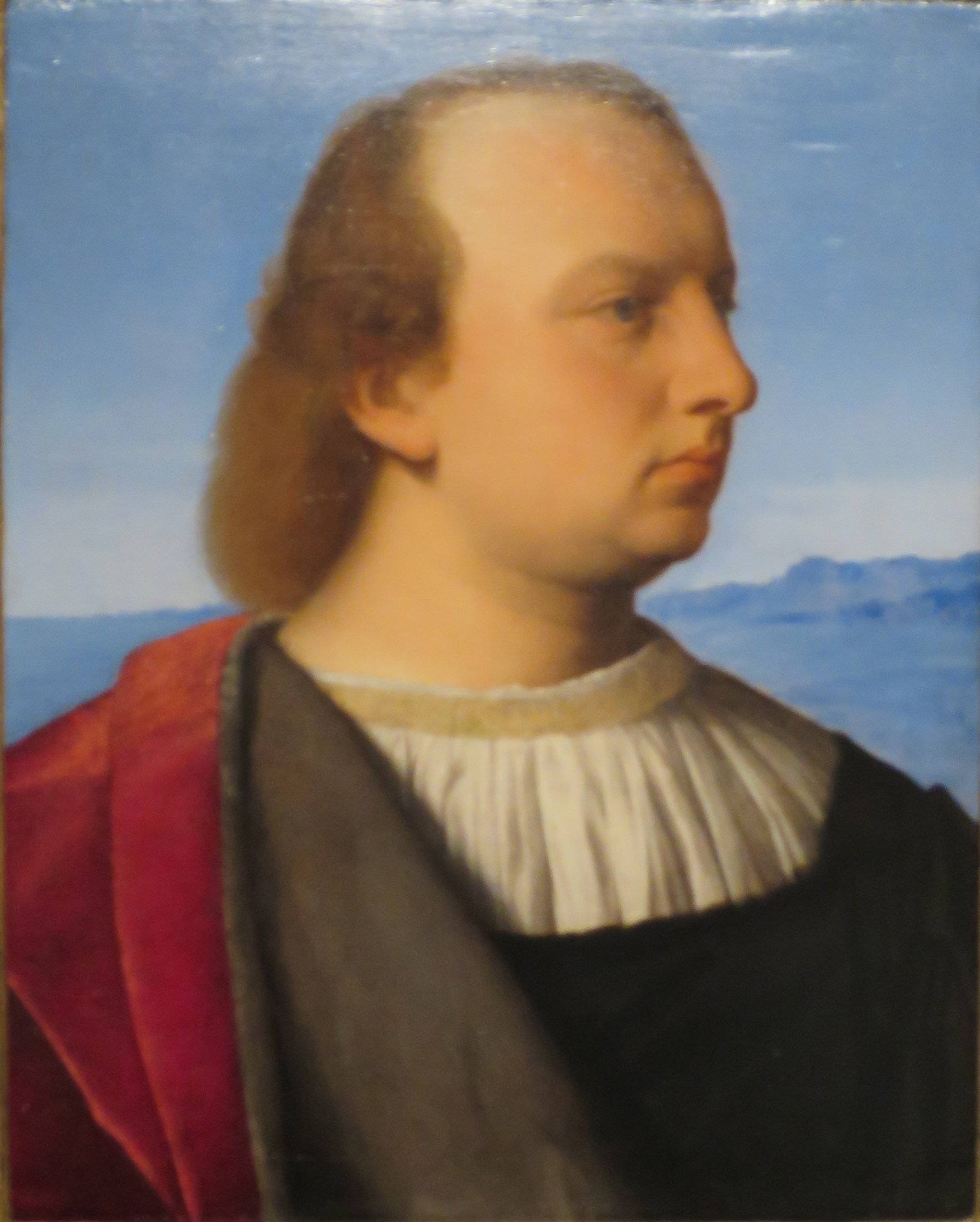
Portrait of Giambattista Memmo by Vincenzo Catena, c. 1510, on display at the Lowe Art Museum

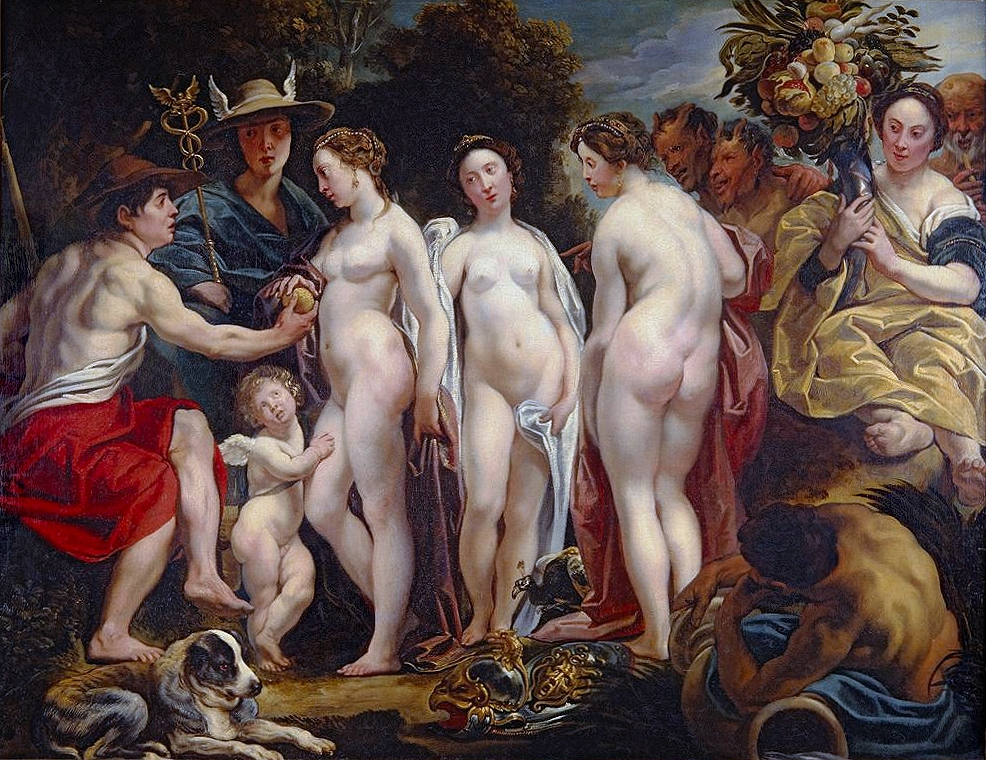
Lowe Art Museum's The Judgment of Paris by Jacob Jordaens, c. 1620–1625

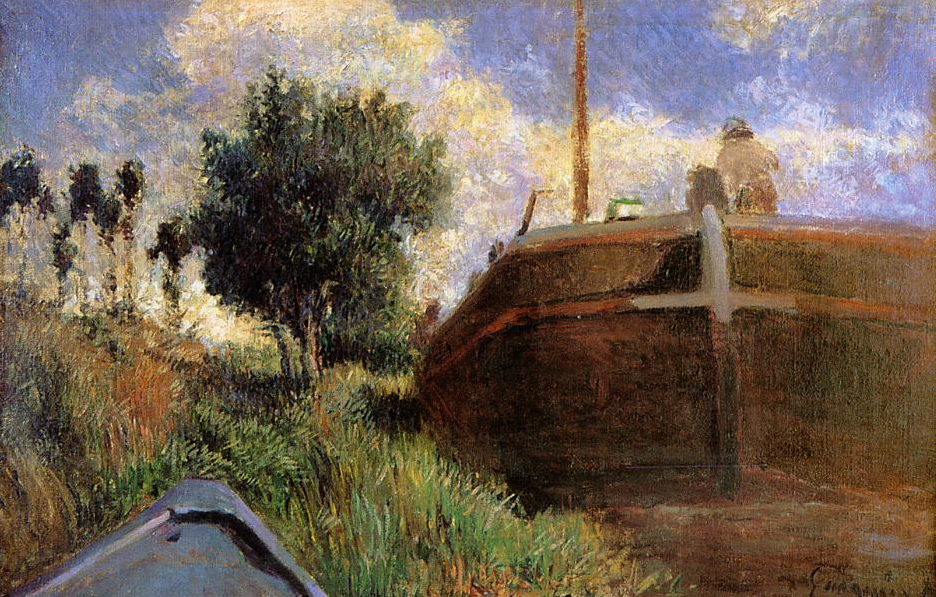
Lowe Art Museum's Le Chaland et la barque, an 1882 painting by Paul Gauguin

The museum has an extensive collection of art with permanent collections in Greco-Roman antiquities, Renaissance, Baroque, 17th- and 19th-century European art, 19th-century American Art, and modern art. The museum's national and international works come from Latin America, Africa, Asia, Native America, Ancient Americas, and Pacific Islands. It also has a large collection of glassworks including creations by Robert Arneson, Jun Kaneko ("Dango") and Christine Federighi ("Globe"). There are also glassworks by Pablo Picasso, William Morris, Emily Brock, Harvey Littleton, Erwin Eisch, and Ginny Ruffner in its permanent collection.

The permanent collection includes works by: Lippo Vanni, Sano di Pietro, Lorenzo di Bicci, Lorenzo di Credi, Vincenzo Catena, Francesco Bacchiacca, Bernardino Fungai, Adrian Isenbrandt, Jacob Jordaens, Jusepe de Ribera, El Greco, Francisco Goya, Thomas Gainsborough, Paul Gauguin, Claude Monet, Alfred Sisley, Frank Stella, Knox Martin, and Duane Hanson. There are also Modern works of Art by Roy Lichtenstein, Sandy Skoglund, Purvis Young, Louise Nevelson, Julian Stanczak, and Enrique Montenegro in the permanent collection.

The museum's most recent expansion, the Myrna and Sheldon Palley Pavilion for Contemporary Glass and Studio Arts, opened in 2008 and added another 4,500 square feet of exhibition space. The museum's collections also include pieces ranging from classical archeology to contemporary art, with important pieces of Renaissance, Baroque, Asian, and Native American art.

=== Greek and Roman antiquities ===
==== Sylvia and Ray Marchman, Jr. Gallery ====
This gallery includes pottery, sculpture, metalwork, and glasswork from ancient Ancient Greece and the Roman Empire, dating from the first millennium BCE through the 4th century CE. The antiquities on view are complemented by Washington Allston's mural-sized, neoclassical painting Jason Returning to Demand His Father's Kingdom (1807–1808).

=== Renaissance and Baroque arts ===
==== Samuel H. Kress, Palley Gallery and Sheila Natasha Simrod Friedman Gallery ====
Here you will find Western European Medieval, Renaissance, and Baroque paintings, sculptures, and decorative art objects including work from the Samuel H. Kress Collection of Renaissance and Baroque art. This wing was built specifically to house the Kress Collection after Lowe was selected as a repository for 41 works in 1961.

=== Arts of Africa ===
==== The Potamkin Family Gallery ====
This gallery offers works from all regions of the African continent with an emphasis on the Sub-Saharan Africa region. Works include architectural elements, ceremonial and ritual objects, costumes, textiles, and sculptures dating from ca. 500 BCE to the present. In addition, there are ceramic, stone, metal, and paper objects from Egypt, the Near East, and Western Asia.

=== Arts of Asia ===
==== Sol and Sheila Taplin Gallery ====
This gallery includes ceramics, metalwork, sculpture, costumes, textiles, and architectural elements dating from the Neolithic period through the present from China, Japan, Korea, India, and Southeast Asia.

=== Indigenous art of the Americas ===
==== Alfred I. Barton Wing ====
This gallery, which is dimly lit to preserve its contents, hosts pottery, basketry, sculpture, costumes, and textiles of Native North, Central, and South America. Works on view span from the period of 2500 BCE to contemporary works by living Native artists.

=== Contemporary and modern art ===
==== Ben Tobin Galleries ====
The long gallery is dedicated to contemporary artwork that is globally influenced and culturally diverse. Contemporary art, produced in the second half of the 20th century or in the 21st century, combines materials, methods, concepts, and subjects that continue to challenge boundaries. Diverse and eclectic, this work is a part of a cultural dialogue that concerns larger contextual frameworks such as personal and cultural identity, politics, community, and nationality.

=== Contemporary glass and ceramics ===
==== Myrna and Sheldon Palley Pavilion and Pat and Larry Stewart Hall, Beaux Arts Bay and Matus Bay ====
The Myrna and Sheldon Palley Pavilion for Contemporary Glass and Studio Arts and houses over 100 objects from Lowe's glass collection as well as ceramics. Palley Pavilion opened on May 1, 2008, thanks to the vision of long-time University supporters and alumni, Sheldon and Myrna Palley, whose collection is a promised gift.

=== Renaissance and Baroque ===
Francesco da Rimini (also called Master of the Blessed Clare)

- Adoration of the Magi, c. 1340

Francesco Guardi (attr.)

- View of the church of Santa Maria della Salute c. 1750

Jacopo Robusti known as Tintoretto

- Portrait of a young man c. second half of 16th century

Vincenzo Catena

- Portrait of Giambattista Memmo c. 1510

Lucas Cranach the Elder

- Portrait of a scholar c. 1515 ca.

Lippo Vanni

- Madonna and Child Enthroned with Donors and Saints Dominic and Elizabeth of Hungary c. 1343

Jacob Jordaens

- The oath of Paris c. 1620–1625

Adriaen Isenbrandt

- Madonna with child and member of the Hillensberger family 1513

Giuseppe Maria Crespi

- Lady with dog c. 1690–1700

Lorenzo di Credi

- Madonna and Child c. 1500

Andrea del Sarto

- Madonna with child and San Giovannino c. 1429

Antonio da Correggio (attr.)

- Portrait of a young woman c. 1515

Ambrogio Bergognone

- Madonna and Child 1520 ca.

=== 17th to 20th century American and European art ===
Jusepe de Ribera

- Sant' Onofrio c. 1642
- St. Peter

Dominikos Theotokopoulos known as El Greco

- Christ Carrying the Cross
- Feast in the House of Simon

Bartolomé Esteban Murillo

- Portrait of a Gentleman

Thomas Gainsborough

- Portrait of Mrs. Collins c. 1770–1775

Francisco José de Goya y Lucientes

- Jose Antonio, Marques de Caballero 1807

Paul Gauguin

- Le Chaland et la barque 1882

Claude Monet

- Waterloo Bridge 1903

Albert Bierstadt

- Yosemite Valley, California c. 1863

André Masson

- Mistral

Fernando Botero

- Las Frutas 1964

Carlos Alfonzo

- Lifetime [Curso de la Vida] 1988

José Bedia

- Nkunia, Gajo or Rama 1995

=== Contemporary ===
Roy Lichtenstein

- Modular Painting in Four Panels V 1969

Frank Stella

- Le Neveu de Rameau 1974

Duane Hanson

- Football Player 1981

Deborah Butterfield

- Rex 1991

Tatiana Parcero

- Interior Cartography # 43 1996

Sandy Skoglund

- Breathing Glass, installation, 2000
