= Carlos Alberto Cruz Boix =

Cuban artist

Carlos Boix (born June 1949, in Havana, Cuba) is an artist.

Considered a self-taught artist as he had no formal academic training, he uses different art forms, including drawing, painting, ceramics, engraving and graphic design. He worked as an illustrator for the newspaper Juventud Rebelde, Havana, Cuba. Based in Europe, he has lived in Paris, Stockholm, Algeria, Tunisia, Geneva and, since 2009, in Madrid.

== Awards ==
During his life he has received many awards and honours such as First Prize in Drawing at the Salón Nacional para Artistas Jóvenes, in Museo Nacional de Bellas Artes, Havana, Cuba, 1971 and First Prize in Painting at I Salón Nacional de Pintura y Escultura Carlos Enríquez, Centro de Arte, Havana, Cuba, 1980.

== Collections ==
The principal collections of his work are Casa de las Américas, Havana, Cuba; the Moderna Museet, Stockholm, Sweden; the Museo Nacional de Bellas Artes de La Habana, Cuba; the National Bank of Cuba's offices in London, UK.

== Exhibitions ==
=== Individual exhibitions ===
- 2007 Galería de José de Ibarra, Barcelona, Spain
- 2007 Deutscher Ring, Hamburg, Germany
- 2005 Galeria Sonia Zannettacci, Geneva, Switzerland
- 2005 Artevie, Abbaye de Cercanceaux, Souppes sur Loing, France
- 2004 Modern Art Gallery Studio f.22, Palazzolo s/O, Italy
- 2002 Eskilstuna Konstmuseum, Eskilstuna, Sweden
- 2002 Monasterio de San Francisco, Havana, Cuba
- 2002 Galeria Sonia Zannettacci, Geneva, Switzerland
- 2001 Dalarnas Museum, Falun, Sweden
- 2000 Modern Art Gallery Studio f.22, Palazzolo s/O, Italy
- 1999 Salon Art Open, Essen, Germany
- 1999 Galerie Cherif Fine Art, La Marsa, Tunisia
- 1998 Galerie Arte Monaco, Monte Carlo, Monaco
- 1996 Galerie Art Présent, Paris, France
- 1995 Galerie Editart, Geneva, Switzerland
- 1994 Moderne Art Gallery Studio f.22, Palazzolo s/O, Italy
- 1994 Galleria Severgnini, Cernusco-Milano, Italy
- 1993 Galerie L'Orangerie, Neuchâtel, Switzerland
- 1992 Centre d'Art en l'Ile, Geneva, Switzerland
- 1992 Galleria Severgnini, Cernusco-Milano, Italy
- 1991 Galleria Linea 70, Verona, Italy
- 1991 Galleria de Clemente, Brescia, Italy
- 1990 Modern Art Gallery Studio f.22, Palazzolo s/O, Italy
- 1990 Galleria Rinaldo Rotta, Genua, Italy
- 1988 Galerie L'Oeil du Boeuf, Paris, France
- 1984 Konstfrämjandet, Stockholm, Sweden
- 1983 Latinamerikanska institutet, Stockholm, Sweden
- 1980 Museo de Artes Decorativas, Havana, Cuba
- 1980 Fundación Wifredo Lam, Havana, Cuba
- 1979 Galería de la UNEAC, Havana, Cuba
- 1979 Galería de Plaza, Havana, Cuba
- 1979 Konstfrämjandet, Stockholm, Sweden
- 1975 Prensa Latina, Havana, Cuba

=== Collective exhibitions ===
- 2006 Art en Capital, Grand Palais, Paris, France
- 2003 Modern Art Gallery Studio f.22, Palazzolo s/O, Italy
- 2001 Galerie Reinhold Ketelbutere, Bruxelles, Belgium
- 1997 Galleria Artistudio, Milano, Italy
- 1997 Galleria del Rigoletto, Milano, Italy
- 1996 Salon de Mai, Paris, France
- 1996 Galleria Severgnini, Cernusco-Milan, Italy
- 1995 Galerie Editart, Geneva, Switzerland
- 1995 Salon Comparaisons, Paris, France
- 1995 Salon de Mai, Paris, France
- 1995 Grands et jeunes d'aujourd'hui, Paris, France
- 1994 Modern Art Gallery Studio f.22, Palazzolo s/O, Italy
- 1994 Galleria Severgnini, Cernusco-Milano, Italy
- 1993 Galerie de l'Orangerie, Neuchâtel, Switzerland
- 1991 Art Gallery Pewny, Geneva, Switzerland
- 1991 Galerie Editart, Geneva, Switzerland
- 1991 Institut National Genevois, Geneva, Switzerland
- 1990 Galerie Editart, Geneva, Switzerland
- 1990 Salon Comparaisons, Paris, France
- 1990 Espacio Latinoamericano, Paris, France
- 1990 Modern Art Gallery Studio f.22, Palazzolo s/O, Italy
- 1988 Espacio Latinoamericano, Paris, France
- 1984 Bienal Internacional de La Habana, Cuba
