= Eduardo Michaelsen =

Cuban painter (1920–2010)

Eduardo Michaelsen (18 April 1920 – 27 January 2010) born as Eduardo Apolonio Michaelsen y Rivery, was a Cuban-born painter. He was known mainly for naïve painting depicting Cuban folklore.

== Biography ==
Born as Eduardo Apolonio Michaelsen y Rivery on 18 April 1920 in Santiago de Cuba, Cuba. In 1944, he studied for five months at the Escuela Nacional de Bellas Artes "San Alejandro" in Havana. In 1967, he created a Course on Museography, at the Museo Nacional de Bellas Artes de La Habana. Among visual arts he worked mainly in paintings. From 1955 until 1972, he was technical assistant in the Museo Nacional de Bellas Artes de La Habana's restoration department.

He arrived in 1980 in the United States, via the Mariel Boatlift, and resided in San Francisco, California until his death.

He died on 27 January 2010, aged 89 in San Francisco, California. A short documentary film titled "Eduardo Michaelsen -Color y Tradición" about his life and artistic creations was produced by Cuban film directors Rafael Matos and Rafael Arzuaga.

The Museo Nacional de Bellas Artes de La Habana have some of his works in their collection.

== Exhibitions ==
=== Solo exhibitions ===
He presented Oleos. Michaelsen in 1963 at the Lyceum of Havana, Cuba. In 1978 he also showed Escucha mi son - Michaelsen 21 óleos in the Galería Ho Chi Minh of the Ministerio de Justicia in Havana. In 1966, an exhibit, Works by E. Michaelsen, appeared at Main Line Gifts, San Francisco, California. In 1991 he named after himself another exhibition at the San Francisco Artspace. In 1994, his drawings, Memorias de Cuba y temas de Santería, were exhibited at the Meridian Gallery of San Francisco. In 1997 he showed Michaelsen. Oil on Canvas in the Cuban Collection Fine Art, Coral Gables, Florida.

=== Group exhibitions ===
He participated in 1962 on Trabajadores del Museo Nacional at the Museo Nacional de Bellas Artes de La Habana. In 1982 he made 10 Out of Cuba in the INTAR Latin American Gallery of New York City, and, in 1987, Art in Exile - an exhibit of Immigrants Artists at the Nexus Gallery of Philadelphia, Pennsylvania.

In 1995 Absolut Mariel - A Historic Overview 1980-1995 was displayed at the South Florida Art Center in Miami Beach, Florida. In May 1995, Art-Exhibit and Silent Auction of Works by Contemporary Artists to Benefit FAITH Services was held at New York City's Jadite Galleries to collect, conserve, exhibit, and interpret the Visual Arts produced by Artists of Cuban heritage.

== Sources ==
- Viegas, Jose (2004). Memoria: Artes Visuales Cubanas Del Siglo Xx (in Spanish). California International Arts. ISBN 978-0-917571-12-1.
- Viegas-Zamora, Jose; Cristina Vives Gutierrez, Adolfo V. Nodal, Valia Garzon, & Dannys Montes de Oca (2001). Memoria: Cuban Art of the 20th Century. California/International Arts Foundation. ISBN 978-0-917571-11-4.
- "Eduardo Michaelson, 89, Exile's Colorful Canvases Depict Cuban Lore", The Miami Herald, 28 January 2010, p. 4B
