= Pablo Quert =

Cuban artist (born 1957)

Pablo Raúl Quert Álvarez
- Born: January 1957 (age 69); Guantanamo, Cuba

Pablo Quert (born Pablo Raúl Quert Álvarez in 1957 in Guantánamo, Cuba) is a Cuban artist specializing in painting, drawing and engraving.

He studied at the Escuela Nacional de Bellas Artes "San Alejandro" in Havana and later he continue his art formation at the Instituto Superior de Arte.

Quert has had several solo shows Pinturas de Pablo Quert in the Pequeño Salón at the Museo Nacional de Bellas Artes de La Habana; in 1979 Grabados at the Lalit Kala Akademi in New Delhi, India and in 1995 Confluencias. Pablo Quert. Dibujos Pinturas Grabados in the Sala de Exposición of COVICICA in Caracas, Venezuela.

Quert's works has been presented in collective exhibitions such as the 1st Bienal de La Habana at the Museo Nacional de Bellas Artes de La Habana; at the Intergrafik’84. Ausstellungszentrum am Fernsehturm in Berlin, Germany; and at the 12th International Independent Exhibition of Prints in Kanagawa Prefectural Gallery in Kanagawa, Japan.

He has also obtained awards and recognitions such as the prize in the Salón Plaza’85, at the Centro de Arte 23 y 12 in Havana, Cuba. He gained also the Honorable Mention Award in La Joven Estampa a young print competition organized by Casa de las Américas.

His works are part of the permanent exhibitions at the Centro Wifredo Lam in Havana; the Galería Latinoamericana in Cracovia, Slovenia; the Contemporary Art Museum in Cairo, Egypt and at the Museo Nacional de Bellas Artes de La Habana.
