= Carlos Rafael Uribazo Garrido =

Cuban artist (born 1951)

- Born: April 16, 1951 (age 74); Santiago de Cuba, Cuba

Carlos Rafael Uribazo Garrido (born April 16, 1951, in Santiago de Cuba, Cuba) is a Cuban artist specializing with painting, engraving, drawing, graphic design, photography, and ceramics. Since 1989, Uribazo resides in Madrid, Spain.

== Individual exhibitions ==
- 1970 – "Grabados y Dibujos de Uribazo"; Biblioteca Elvira Cape, in Santiago de Cuba, Cuba.
- 1982 – "Recuento Gráfico de Carlos Uribazo", Pequeño Salon, Museo Nacional de Bellas Artes de La Habana, Havana, Cuba.
- 1991 – "Pintures. Uribazo", Galería San Sisteré, Santa Coloma de Gramenet, Barcelona, Spain.
- 1995 – "Pintura de Uribazo", Expo Arte, Centro Internacional de Arte, Madrid, Spain.

== Collective exhibitions ==
He has been a part of many collective exhibitions:

- 1971 –Salón Nacional para artistas jóvenes in the Museo Nacional de Bellas Artes de La Habana, Havana, Cuba
- 1976 – "Cuban Poster Show", The Interchurch Center organized by the Center for Cuban Studies, New York City.
- 1976 – "Viva Cuba Libre"; Festival de la Revista Avant Garde, Paris, France.
- 1992 – "Bienal de Mini Grabado"; Museo Municipal de Ourense, Ourense, Galicia, Spain.
- 1995 – "I Encuentro Cultural Hispanoamericano"; Mercado de Puerta de Toledo, Madrid, Spain.

== Awards ==
Uribazo has obtained various recognitions:

- 1975 – Second Place in Design, "III Salón Nacional de Profesores e Instructores de Artes Plásticas"; Galería de La Habana, Havana, Cuba.
- 1975 – Second Place in Engraving, "III Salón Nacional de Profesores e Instructores de Artes Plásticas"; Galería de La Habana, Havana, Cuba.
- 1986 – Honorable Mention in Engraving, "Salón de la Ciudad'86", Centro Provincial de Artes Plásticas y Diseño, in Havana, Cuba.
- 1992 – Juror's Special Mention, "Bienal de Mini Grabado", Museo Municipal de Ourense, Ourense, Spain.

== Collections ==
His works are in the permanent collections of:

- Fundació Jaume Guasch, in Barcelona, Spain;
- Collection of Engravings; Gallery of New Masters, Dresden, Germany;
- Museo Nacional de Bellas Artes de La Habana, Cuba;
- Museo Torre Baldovina, Santa Coloma de Gramenet, Barcelona, Spain.
