= Saidel Brito Lorenzo =

Cuban artist

- Born: December 4, 1973 (age 52); Matanzas, Cuba

Saidel Brito (born Saidel Brito Lorenzo on December 4, 1973, in Matanzas, Cuba) is a prominent Cuban artist specializing in drawing, sculpture, installation and photography.

Brito studied in 1992 at the Escuela Nacional de Arte (ENA) and continued at Instituto Superior de Arte (ISA) in Havana, Cuba graduating in 1997.

== Individual exhibitions ==
- 1992 – "Aruacos, Cubanos y Mitos ", Escuela Nacional de Arte (ENA), Havana, Cuba.
- 1996 – "Cuentos bobos", Galería Espacio Abierto de la Revista Revolución y Cultura, Havana, Cuba.
- 1998 – "Saidel Brito. Provisorische Utopien. Skulpturen und Zeichnungen", Ludwig Forum für Internationale Kunst, Aachen, Germany.
- 2004 – "Saidel Brito: Habeas Corpus", dpm Arte Contemporáneo, Guayaquil, Ecuador

== Collective exhibitions ==
He was part of many collectives exhibitions:

- 1994 – "Shankar’s International Children’s Competition 1987", Nehru House, New Delhi, India.
- 1995 – "No valen guayabas verdes", Bienal de La Habana, Instituto Superior de Arte (ISA), Havana, Cuba.
- 1995 – "McEvilley and Me", Whitechapel Art Gallery, London, United Kingdom.
- 1996 – "New Art from Cuba", Whitechapel Art Gallery, London, United Kingdom.
- 1996 – "Salón de Arte Cubano Contemporáneo", Museo Nacional de Bellas Artes de La Habana, Cuba.
- 1997 – Pabellón de Cristal, Madrid, Spain.
- 1998 – "La cabra tira al monte", Miami Art Gallery, United States, Miami.
- 1998 – VI Bienal Internacional de Cuenca, Bienal Internacional de Cuenca, Cuenca, Ecuador.
- 1999 – "While Cuba Waits", Track 16 Gallery United States, Santa Monica, California.
- 2002 – "Marco Alvarado & Saidel Brito", dpm Arte Contemporáneo, Guayaquil, Ecuador
- 2005 – "Contiene Glutamato", Galería OMR, Mexico City, Mexico
- 2006 – "WAITING LIST: Time and transition in Cuban Contemporary Art", City Art Museum of Ljubljana, Ljubljana,
- 2007 – El Museo's Bienal: The (S) Files, El Museo del Barrio, New York City, New York

== Awards ==
- 1997– Raúl Martínez Prize – Instituto Superior de Arte (ISA), Havana, Cuba.
- 1998– Artist in Residence – Ludwig Forum fur Internationale Kunst, Aachen, Germany.
- 2003 – First Prize – "Salón de Julio", Museo Municipal de Guayaquil, Guayaquil, Ecuador.
- 2005 – Third Prize – "Salón de Julio", Museo Municipal de Guayaquil, Guayaquil, Ecuador.
