= Raúl Cordero =

Cuban painter (born 1971)

- Born: 1971 (age 54–55); La Habana, Cuba
- Known for: painting, installation
- Website: https://raulcorderostudio.com/

Raúl Cordero (born 1971) is a Cuban born conceptual painter. First known as part of the 90s generation in Cuba, when he started exhibiting his work mostly in Europe and the United States of America. Cordero represents through his work the "other Cuban art." Far from the standards of the Cuban Revolution art, and without falling into topics of other artists from in and out of the island, Cordero samples pretexts whimsically obtained from various referential origins (press, magazines, books, TV, photography and video) and shows us his work as a result of recycling, of a revival, creating a new reality that refers more to art than to any other apparent content.

== Education ==
His art education started in Havana (Academia San Alejandro and Instituto Superior de Diseño) and his influences mix an interest in conceptual American artists such as John Baldessari, Bruce Nauman or Chris Burden -who later informed his conceptual training- together with elements of the 12th century's Flemish painting tradition, acquired during his postgraduate formation in the Netherlands (Graphic Media Development Centre and Rijksakademie Van Beeldende Kunsten). Cordero has held visiting professorships at the Instituto Superior de Arte (ISA) in Havana, Cuba; The San Francisco Art Institute, California and The Art Academy of Cincinnati, in Ohio, U.S.A.

== Career ==
His work features in the collection of several museums such as Musée National D’Art Moderne Centre Pompidou, Paris, France, Museo Nacional de Bellas Artes de La Habana, Cuba, Los Angeles County Museum of Art (LACMA), Museum of Contemporary Art, Los Angeles (MOCA), California, Stedelijk Museum voor Actuele Kunst (SMAK). Ghent, Belgium, Centro Atlántico de Arte Moderno and Museo Extremeño Iberoamericano de Arte Contemporáneo (MEIAC), Spain, Museum of Contemporary Art, San Diego, California, U.S. The National Museum of Fine Arts in Havana is currently building a large exhibition of Cordero's work, which was scheduled to open in November 2017. Cordero is represented by Mai 36 Galerie in Zürich, Switzerland, and Wizard Gallery in London, United Kingdom, and Milan, Italy.

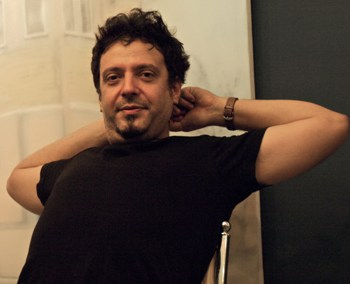
Raúl Cordero in 2008

== Collections ==
- Musée National D’Art Moderne Centre Pompidou. Paris, France.
- Centro Atlántico de Arte Moderno. Palmas de Gran Canaria, Spain.
- Columbus Museum of Arts. Columbus, Ohio, U.S.A.
- DAROS Collection. Zürich, Switzerland.
- The Pizzuti Collection. Columbus, Ohio, U.S.A.
- Stedelijk Museum voor Actuele Kunst (SMAK). Gent, Belgium
- Pérez Art Museum Miami (PAMM). Miami, Florida, U.S.A.
- Los Angeles County Museum of Art (LACMA). Los Angeles, California, U.S.A.
- Museo Nacional de Bellas Artes. Havana, Cuba
- Museum of Art Fort Lauderdale. Fort Lauderdale, Florida. U.S.A.
- Museum of Contemporary Art (MOCA). Los Angeles, California, U.S.A.
- Museum voor Moderne Kunst. Arnhem, Holland.
- Neuberger Bergman Collection. New York, U.S.A.
- Centro Wifredo Lam. Havana, Cuba.
- University of Central Florida Library Collection. Orlando, Florida, U.S.A.
- Museo Extremeño e Iberoamericano de Arte Contemporáneo (MEIAC). Badajoz, Extremadura, Spain
- Museum of Contemporary Art San Diego. California, U.S.A.
- The Vanmoerkerke Collection. Oostende, Belgium
- Museum of Latin American Art (MOLAA). Long Beach, California, U.S.A.
- The Ringier Collection. Winterthur, Switzerland.
- El Espacio 23. Miami, Florida
- Marval Collection. Milan, Italy
