= Fernando Díaz Domínguez =

Cuban-American artist (1932–1983)

Fernando Luis Díaz Domínguez
- Born: June 1932; Havana, Cuba
- Died: 1983; Miami, Florida
- Occupation: Artist

Fernando Luis Díaz Domínguez (June 1932 in Havana, Cuba – 1983 in Miami, Florida) was a Cuban-American artist.

== Solo exhibitions ==
In 1963, he exhibited at the Galería La Rampa, Havana, and in 1964 at the Galería UNEAC, Havana. In 1965 he exhibited his paintings at the Galerie Saint Germaine, Paris, France. In 1971 he had an exhibition at Madrid, Spain. He presented an exhibition at Landi Fine Arts, Glencoe, Illinois, in 1981.

== Collective exhibitions ==
Díaz has been involved in several collective exhibitions such as Mexico's Second Interamerican Biennial, Palacio de Bellas Artes, Mexico, in 1960. Between 1962 and 1964, his works were included in shows at the Museo Nacional de Bellas Artes de La Habana, Cuba. In 1965 his work was displayed at the IVème Biennale de Paris, Musée d'Art Moderne de la Ville de Paris, France. In 1975 his work was shown as part of a group exhibition at the Museo de Arte Moderno, San Sebastián, Spain.

== Awards ==
In 1969 Díaz won the I Premio de Experimento Impreso at the Salón Nacional de Artes Plásticas, Centro de Arte Internacional in Havana. In 1971, he gained the Cintas Foundation Fellowship, New York City.
