= Edgar Soberón =

Cuban-born American painter & printmaker (born 1962)

Edgar Soberon
- Born: May 12, 1962 (age 63); Cienfuegos, Cuba
- Education: Parsons School of Design
- Known for: Visual artist, painter, printmaker
- Style: realism, abstraction
- Spouse(s): Paulina Hawkins, 1957-2019
- Website: http://www.esoberon.com

Edgar Soberon (born 1962 in Cienfuegos, Cuba) is a Cuban-born American painter and printmaker.

Soberon studied at Parsons School of Design in New York City, where he later served as Drawing and Printmaking instructor with the Foundation and Fine Arts Departments from 1992 through 2002. In 1996 Soberon was awarded the prestigious, Teaching Excellence Award by the New School University and Parsons School of Design for his outstanding contributions in art education.

Soberón's work has been in numerous exhibitions, including two important Still Life Survey Exhibitions: Silent Thing Secret Things, Still Life Painting from Rembrandt to the Millennium, Albuquerque Museum of Art, Albuquerque, New Mexico 1999-2000 and Reflections of Time and Place: Latin American Still Life in the 20th Century, Katonah Museum of Art, Katonah, New York and El Museo del Barrio, New York, N.Y. In the Fall of 2009, the Montgomery Museum of Fine Arts, Montgomery, Alabama presented the exhibition, a solo exhibition of more than 40 paintings and prints which highlighted Soberón's still life work from the late 1990s to the present.

His work can be found in the Permanent Collection of the Library of Congress Prints and Photographs Division, Washington DC, The Hechinger Collection, Washington DC, The Jane Voorhies Zimmerli Museum of Art, Rutgers Archives for Printmaking, New Brunswick, N.J, the Montgomery Museum of Fine Arts, Montgomery, Alabama and El Museo del Barrio, New York, N.Y. The Joel and Lila Harnett Print Study Center, University of Richmond, Virginia, Fundación Milenio, Mexico City, Mexico.
