= José Manuel Villa Castillo =

Cuban artist

- Born: December 28, 1939; Las Villas, Cuba
- Occupation(s): Artist; Interior designer

José Manuel Villa Castillo (born December 28, 1939, in Las Villas, Cuba) is a Cuban artist.

His artistic interests include graphic design, scenographic design, interior design, drawing, illustrations, painting, and engraving. In 1957 he studied publicity and commercial drawing in Havana.

From 1957 to 1959 he was a designer of shop windows in Havana. Customers included the Flogar, Belinda, and Roseland department stores.

In 1967 he was graphic designer of the Cuban pavilion at the World's fair, Expo 67, held in Montreal.

== Individual exhibitions ==
In 1960 he presented José Manuel, in Galería Habana, Arte y Cinema La Rampa, Havana.

== Collective exhibitions ==
In 1956 he was part of the Pintores y Escultores Noveles, in the Lyceum, Havana. He participated in the I(1962), II (1964), III (1965), and IV (1966) Salón Nacional de Carteles Cubanos, in the Museo Nacional de Bellas Artes, Havana. In 1969 he was included in the Cuba à Grenoble, Maison de la Culture de Grenoble, in Grenoble, France. In 1970 some of his works were selected to appear at the 3rd International Poster Biennale Warsaw, held at the Galeria Zachęta, in Warsaw, Poland. In 1985 he was included in the Lahti VI Poster Biennale, Lahti Art Museum, Lahti, Finland. In 1986 he was one of the selected artists for the XII Biennale of Graphic Design, Brno, held at the Moravian Gallery, Brno, Czechoslovakia.

== Awards ==
In 1966 he won Second Prize for Cultural Poster at the 4th Salón Nacional de Carteles Cubanos, Museo Nacional de Bellas Artes, in Havana. In 1971 he won the gold medal at the International Book Art Fair (IBA), held in Leipzig, Germany. In 1973 he obtained the Silver Medal (shared) at the International Book Art Fair in Leipzig, and in 1994 he was recognized with the Order Por la Cultura Nacional, Consejo de Estado, Republic of Cuba.

== Collections ==
His works can be found in collections such as at the Biblioteca Nacional "José Martí" in Havana, the Casa de las Américas, in Havana, the Museo Nacional de Bellas Artes, Havana, and in the Museum der Bildende Kunst (Book Art Collection), Leipzig.

== Scenographies and works in public places ==
In 1978 he was in charge of set decoration for the film Los Sobrevivientes, directed by Tomás Gutiérrez Alea. In 1983 he worked on the film Hasta Cierto Punto from the same director. In 1989 he was appointed Head of the Atmosphere Staff at the Hotel Tuxpán, in Varadero, Cuba. In the Hotel Neptuno in Havana he was in charge of decor and created a graffito mural. In 1995 he decorated the Meliá Cohiba Hotel, in Havana.
