= Liliam Cuenca =

Cuban artist

- Born: June 25, 1944 (age 80); Havana, Cuba
- Occupation: Artist

Liliam Cuenca (born Liliam Cuenca González on 25 June 1944 in Havana, Cuba) is a Cuban artist. She studied at the Escuela Nacional de Bellas Artes "San Alejandro" in Havana.

== Individual exhibitions ==
Her solo exhibitions include one in 1978 at the Museo Nacional de Bellas Artes de La Habana. In 1990 she presented her works at the Ridel Gallery in Puerto Rico. In 1995 exhibited in Metro-Dade Cultural Resource Center in Miami, Florida.

== Collective exhibitions ==
In 1973 she participated in the III Salón Nacional Juvenil de Artes Plásticas, Museo Nacional de Bellas Artes, Havana. In 1976 she was included in the VI Salón Nacional Juvenil de Artes Plásticas, Museo Nacional de Bellas Artes, Havana. She also participated in collective exhibitions in the Museo Ayacucho, Cumaná, Venezuela, 1983; at the Museo de Arte La Rinconada, Caracas, Venezuela, 1984; in 1989 at the Museum of Art, Fort Lauderdale, Florida, and in 1996 at The Housatonic Museum of Art, Bridgeport, Connecticut.

== Awards ==
In 1979 she obtained the First Prize at the First Engraving Trienal Víctor Manuelheld at the Galería de Havana.
