= Pachy Lopez =

Cuban songwriter

- Born: Reinaldo Ricardo Lopez Cabello; August 11, 1968 (age 58); Havana, Cuba
- Citizenship: Cuba; United States
- Education: Florida International University
- Occupations: Singer; songwriter; musician; record producer; actor
- Years active: 1982–present
- Musical career
- Instruments: Vocals; guitar

Reinaldo Ricardo Lopez Cabello, known as Pachy Lopez (August 11, 1968), is a Cuban musician and songwriter.

== Early life ==
Reinaldo Ricardo Lopez Cabello was born in Havana, Cuba, on August 11, 1968. He is the son of Reinaldo Lopez, a percussionist, and Norma A. Cabello, a club singer in the Havana highlife club scene of the 60s and 70s. At the age of eight, he began his musical studies, choosing the guitar as his favorite instrument.

Aged 14, influenced by family tradition, his aunts and cousins introduced him to the world of theater. He later became an actor/writer, winning awards as the youngest writer of the industry. These awards set him up to travel to the National Theater of Panama in 1988 for a presentation, where he defected the Cuban regime. Lopez arrived in Miami, Florida in 1990, and still lives there with his family.

== Career ==
In the early 1990s, Lopez worked as a freelance songwriter. His first radio hit "Romanticos al Rescate", was sung by Luis Enrique, and other hits such as "Amor de Novela", "El Rey Del Mundo", "Estas Hecha Para Mi", "Si Quieres Amar" and "Nada es Igual Sin Ti" were created during his relationship with Sony, which still owns part of his catalog.

In 1997, he graduated from F.I.U. with a Bachelor of Science in Communication, and continued his writing career by founding Artistik Connections Music Publishing. The company later signed a co-publishing agreement with PEER MUSIC PUBLISHING. During his contractual relationship with PEER, he developed a catalog of 184 songs, and published several songs recorded by artists including Rey Ruiz, Víctor Manuelle, Alejandra Guzmán, Yuri, Jaime Camil, and Willy Chirino.

In 2003 he retired from his music writing career and founded Red Door Productions, Inc, an event production and marketing firm servicing the entertainment and event industry in the South Florida area.

Lopez was also a photographer, and in 2007 he was awarded by the International Library of Photography. His images have been used in the entertainment industry for advertising campaigns, concert promotions, TV ads, billboards, internet campaigns and three published books by the International Library of Photography.

In the early 2000s, Pachy returned to his songwriting career, co-writing tracks for albums by Marc Anthony ("Si Fuera Fácil") and by Gente De Zona ("Vampiro"), both released in 2022. In 2024, he co-wrote the single "Ven" by Puerto Rican singer Christian Daniel.

In 2025, he reemerged as a solo artist with Buena Fortuna, a heartfelt collection of original songs co-written with Jorge Luis Piloto who is also the producer. The album features standout tracks like “Mi Bendición,” “Estrellitas y Sueños,” and the upbeat title track, blending poetic lyrics with acoustic textures and tropical rhythms. Recorded in an intimate Miami home studio with local musicians, Buena Fortuna marks a new chapter in Pachy’s artistic journey, one rooted in gratitude, love, and musical craftsmanship.

== Discography ==
- 1993 Alvaro Torres - Te Llevo Dentro
- 1993 Lourdes Robles - Se Te Nota
- 1994 Luis Enrique - Románticos Al Rescate
- 1994 Victor Manuel - Te LLevo Dentro
- 1995 Jerry Rivera - Amor Mágico
- 1995 Rafael Armando - Un Beso De Quien Amas
- 1995 Rey Ruiz - El Rey Del Mundo
- 1996 Angel Joel - Atracción, Estas Hecha Para Mi
- 1996 Jomar - Fuera De Lo Común, Estás Hecha Para Mi
- 1996 Rey Ruiz - Saber Amar
- 1997 Lucrecia - No Me Hacen Falta Alas
- 1997 Giro - Una Historia De Amor
- 1998 Servando y Florentino - Estás Hecha Para Mi
- 1998 Miguel Angel Guerra - Orar En La Mañana
- 1998 Fabby - Te Amo
- 1998 Liliana - Comenzar De Cero
- 1998 Lourdes Robles - Si Pudieras Amarme
- 1998 Alejandro Martinez - Dime Si Es Amor, Escápate Conmigo
- 1998 Jailene - Que Tu Fe Nunca Muera
- 1998 Jerry Rivera - Si Quieres Amar
- 1998 Onda Vaselina - Desconéctate
- 1999 Charlie Cruz - Grito Tu Nombre
- 1999 Yolandita Monge - Vibraciones Positivas
- 1999 Amparo Sandino - Asi Es Mi Gente, Si Yo Pudiera
- 1999 Marcelo Cano - Angeles
- 1999 Alejandra Guzmán - Grita
- 1999 Los Grana - Si Quieres Amar
- 1999 Luis Enrique - Y Soñar
- 2000 Juan Carlos Coronel - Edad Madura
- 2000 Miguel Angel Guerra - Fe
- 2000 Los Hidalgo - Si Pudieras Amarme, Dime Que Si
- 2000 Jerry Rivera - Amor De Novela
- 2000 Jaime Camil - Nada Es Igual Sin Ti, Fiesta De Amor, Me Llegó El Amor, Si Quieres Amar
- 2000 Jerry Rivera - Navegándote
- 2001 Daniela Luján - Vuela Alto
- 2001 Jerry Rivera - Volverás, Un Beso De Quien Amas
- 2001 Yuri - Que Tu Fe Nunca Muera
- 2004 Willy Chirino - Solo Por Amor, Veneno
- 2022 Gente De Zona - Vampiro
- 2022 Marc Anthony - Si Fuera Fácil
- 2024 - Christian Daniel - Ven
- 2025 Pachy Lopez - Buena Fortuna
