= Gilberto Ruiz Valdez =

Cuban-American artist

Gilberto Ruíz Valdéz
- Born: 1950 (age 75–76); Havana, Cuba
- Occupation: Artist

Gilberto Ruíz Valdéz (born 1950 in Havana, Cuba) is a Cuban-American artist.

== Education ==
Ruíz studied at the Escuela Nacional de Bellas Artes "San Alejandro", and at the National Design School in Havana.

== Exhibitions ==
Ruiz had his first exhibition in 1971 at the Galería L in Havana. In 1993 his works were exhibited in the show Gilberto Ruiz: Cañampúas and Other Characters at the Barbara Gillman Gallery in Miami, Florida.

In a collective perspective in 1979, Ruiz participated in the I Trienal de Dibujo Arístides Fernández. Salón Lalo Carrasco at the Hotel Habana Libre in Havana and in 1985 at the 27th Annual Hortt Memorial Exhibition held at the Museum of Art of Fort Lauderdale, Florida.

== Awards ==
In 1979, he obtained a prize at the I Trienal de Dibujo Arístides Fernández held at the Salón Lalo Carrasco at the Hotel Habana Libre, Havana. In 1980, Ruiz won second place in the contest La Literatura en la Plástica Homenaje al Onelio Jorge Cardoso at the Teatro Nacional de Cuba, Havana. In 1985, he received the National Endowment for the Arts Fellowship, Washington, D.C., and in 1987 won the Hort Memorial Competition Award at Museum of Art of Fort Lauderdale, Florida.

== Collections ==
His works are part of the permanent collections at the Kaufman and Roberts Corporation, Miami; the Miami-Dade Public Library System, Miami; the Museum of Art of Fort Lauderdale; and at the Oscar B. Cintas Foundation, New York City.

== References and external links ==
- University of Notre Dame
- Smithsonian Archives of American Art
- Gilberto Ruíz Valdéz at IMDb
- Cuba Encuentros magazine, Miami Y El Arte Del Exilio by Ricardo Pau-Llosa, Summer of 2004. (in Spanish)
- Cuba Encuentros magazine, Profetas Por Conocer by Ileana Fuentes, Fall of 2005 (in Spanish)
