= Martha Jiménez =

Cuban artist

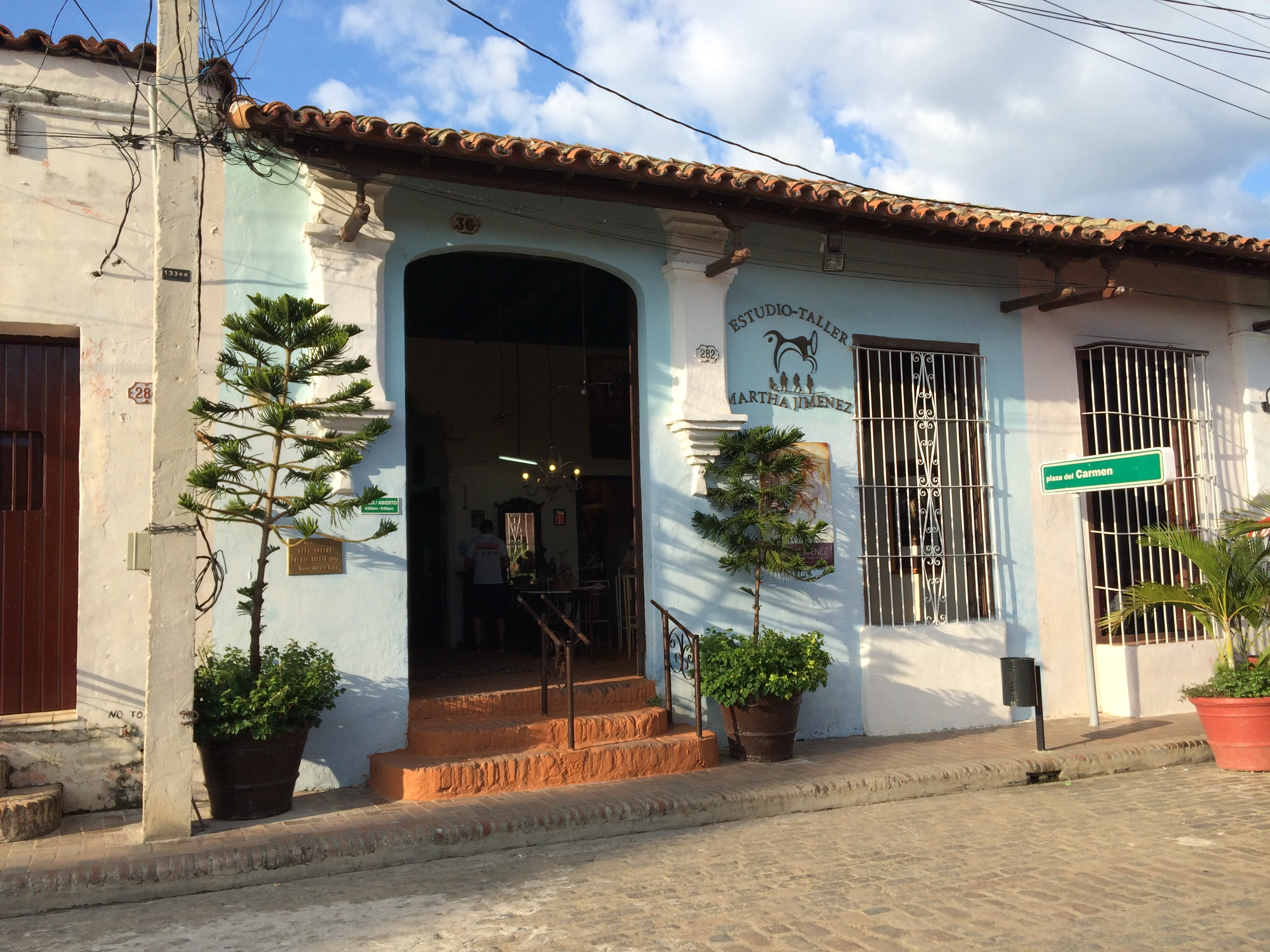
Atelier of Martha Jimenez at the Plaza del Carmen in Camagüey.

Martha Petrona Jiménez is a Cuban artist working in sculpture, ceramics, and painting. Her atelier is in Camagüey, Cuba, at the Plaza del Carmen, where several of her life-sized bronze statues are installed. Jiménez was one of the first graduates of the Cuban Art Instructors' School, graduating with the first class in 1971. She won the UNESCO Distinction for the National Culture in 1997, and was recognised at the 2010 Shanghai Biennale. She also was awarded a prize at the 5th International Sculpture Symposium in Turkey in 2011 for her statue La Gineta. Her works are found in several private collections around the world.
