= Mirta Cerra Herrera =

Cuban painter (1904–1986)

- Born: April 23, 1904; Bejucal, Cuba
- Died: September 26, 1986 (aged 82); Havana, Cuba
- Occupation: Painter

Mirta Cerra Herrera (April 23, 1904 in Bejucal, Cuba – September 26, 1986 in Havana, Cuba) was a Cuban painter.

== Education ==
She studied from 1928 until 1934 at the Escuela Nacional de Bellas Artes San Alejandro, Havana, and at the Art Students League, New York, between 1935 and 1936.

== Solo exhibitions ==
She had a solo exhibition in 1943 titled Exposición de Pintura Mirta Cerra at the Lyceum, Havana. In 1950 she showed her works at the Club de las Naciones Unidas, Washington, D.C. In 1955 she had a show in New York titled Mirta Cerra, at the Galería Sudamericana. Later in 1983 some of hers works were exhibited as Vida Plena. Pinturas y Dibujos de Mirta Cerra at Galería L in Havana.

== Collective exhibitions ==
In 1940 Herrera participated in 300 años de arte en Cuba at the Universidad de La Habana. In 1951 her work was seen as part of Art Cubain Contemporain at the Musée National d'Art Moderne, Paris, France. She participated in the Salón Nacional de Pintura, Dibujo, Grabado, Escultura, Arquitectura y Artes Decorativas y Applicadas at the Segunda Bienal Hispanoamericana de Arte seen at the Museo Nacional de Bellas Artes in Havana in 1954. Her pieces were included in the 1993 commemorative show San Alejandro. 175 Aniversario at the Museo Nacional de Bellas Artes, Havana.

== Awards ==
In 1937 Herrera won the bronze medal at the XIX Círculo de Bellas Artes, Havana. In 1946 she won an award at the third Exposición Nacional de Pintura y Escultura held at the Salón de los Pasos Perdidos, Capitolio Nacional, Havana. In 1951 she won a silver medal at the Exposición de Artes Plásticas Cubanas held at Tampa's University of Florida.

== Collections ==
Her work is part of the collection of the Museo Nacional de Bellas Artes de La Habana, Havana, and of the Museum of Arts and Science, Daytona Beach, Florida.
