= Mario Perez (artist) =

Cuban artist

Mario Perez (born June 17, 1943) is a Cuban artist.

== Art ==
Perez emigrated to the United States as a teenager and has focused his artistic career primarily on documenting the pre-war Havana of his youth. He is noted for his urban landscapes often recreated from memory. His work has become especially popular in Cuban expatriate communities, such as in south Florida, where collectors celebrate his ability to recapture the tone and atmosphere of 1940s and 1950s Cuba before the revolution. Perez works primarily in a combination of pen/ink and watercolor, though some of his most noted (and most overtly political) work appears in oil on canvas. These include "La Muerte de José Martí", depicting the death of the Cuban national hero and poet who led the nation's independence movement against Spain, and who died in a charge during the Battle of Dos Rios.

Perez is also known for his work in charcoal, in particular his series of portraits of jazz musicians, many of whom performed in Cuba prior to the country's fall to communism. As an untrained artist who grew up on the impoverished streets of Havana, Perez's family had no money to purchase art supplies, leaving him drawing with broken pencil nubs on scraps of paper. He left Cuba at the age of 15, after the death of his mother, and did not return for more than 40 years. A visit to Cuba in 2000, after receiving an entry visa from Fidel Castro's government, led to a particularly productive period in his work.

Perez's style is classified as primitive art, also called naive art, a category used to describe notable work produced by artists without formal schooling, such as Grandma Moses, and which captures instinctive artistic expressions without the typical conventions and uniformity of classically educated instruction.

== Family ==
Perez has a wife, Margaret, and three children. Perez currently resides in Yorba Linda, California.
