= Armando Mariño =

Cuban artist (born 1968)

Mr Armando Mariño
- Born: September 30, 1968; Santiago de Cuba, Cuba
- Known for: Painting, Sculptor
- Notable work: The Raft (La Patera), 2002; The Farmer’s Daughter, 2012
- Website: armandomarino.com

Armando Mariño (born 1968) is a Cuban artist. He works with oil and watercolour and is known for his strong, vibrant and intense palette. He is the holder of many awards including the Segundo Premio, Salón Nacional de Arte contemporáneo Cubano. He lives and works in New York.

== Biography ==
Armando Mariño was born in Santiago de Cuba, Cuba in 1968 into a family of scientists. His mother was a physicist and his father an engineer. Despite their desire that he follow a scientific career, he chose to pursue his love of art. He graduated from the Provincial School of Arts in Santiago de Cuba in 1987 and the School of Artistic Education at the “Enrique José Varona” Superior Pedagogic Institute in Havana in 1992. He claims that the most important lesson learned from these Cuban artists was the awareness of contemporary art theories and concepts. In 2004 and 2005 he studied at the Rijksakademie van Beeldende Kunsten in Amsterdam, the Netherlands. Much of his work reflects social unrest, protests and rebellion. He uses bold, vibrant colours, in multiple layers to build up his oil or watercolour works. "Armando Marino filled his paintings around the end of the 1990s with corrosive historical fictions in which Cuban and European-Western art history crash into each other" His works are displayed in numerous galleries around the world including the Gericke + Paffrath Gallery, Coates & Scarry (London, UK) and Faction Art Project NY

== Works ==
- The Raft (La Patera). 2002. Sculpture.
- The Farmer's Daughter. 2012. Oil on canvas.
- House of the Colors. 2012. Oil on canvas.
- The Revolutionary. 2013. Oil on canvas.
- The Flower Man. 2013. Oil on canvas.
- Memento Mori. 2013. Oil on canvas.
- Crying Girl. 2015. Oil on canvas.
- Tree House. 2015. Oil on canvas.
- Narcissus. 2017. Watercolor on paper.
- The Coldest Night. 2017. Oil on canvas.

== The Raft ==
The Raft sculpture was acquired by 21c Museum, Kentucky, USA in January 2011. It features a wheel-less 1950 Plymouth Special Deluxe. The car is supported by a multitude of Cuban legs, depicting the hardships and arduous journeys undertaken by Cubans to leave the Island. It can be seen to represent the resourcefulness and strength of the Cuban people as a symbol of hope, marching forward towards a better life.

This is the second rendition of the sculpture. The first was displayed at the Havana Biennial, Cuba in 2003. The sculpture was unable to be taken out of Cuba after the exhibition and was eventually destroyed.

== Bibliography ==
- To and From Utopia in the New Cuban Art, Rachel Weiss, Publisher University of Minnesota Press/Minneapolis London, "ISBN 978-0-8166-6515-0".
- "Something and Something Else", From the Art Collection of Oce, Museum Van Bommel Van Dam 19.09.2008, AD Venlo Netherland.
- Armando Marino, VIII Bienal de la Habana, Nov 2003, "Change the Joke Slip the Yoke" Text by Frankilng Sirman, Photos by Armando Marino and Ciuco Gutierrez, Print by Grafur S A Madrid Spain 2003.
- Cimal, Revista de Arte Internacional 2 Etapa No 52 – 2000, Valencia. Spain, Article Marcel Duchamp A proposito del Negro. Notas introductorias al objeto muerto de risa. By Armando Marino, "Page 31, ISSN 0210-119X".
- Armando Marino, Escultura -Dibujos-Instalaciones, Travesuras y Parodias, Text by Fernando Castro Flores. Photograph by Ciuco Gutierrez, 1997–2000, Printed by Grafur .S.A Madrid. Spain, "Legal Deposit M 11726- 2000".
- "Without Mask", Contemporary Afro Cuban Art from the Von Christierson Collection, Curated by Orlando Hernandez, Publisher Watch Hill Charitable Foundation, "ISBN 978-0-620-47168-8", 2010.
- Armando Marino by Carlos Jimenez, Reviews page 141, Art Nexus .N 51 Volume 2 Year 2003.
- "Erased Border". Latin American Master, Artist's project room, Curated by Agustin Arteaga, Produced by Gary Nader Editions, Printed by Arte al Dia.
- Sinergias. Arte Latinoamericano en Espana, Curated by Carlos Jimenez, Edited by CEXECI. Printed by Indulgrafic, Artes Graficas, "ISBN 978-84-938321-1-7".
- Armando Marino. El gesto de la pintura, Text by Ruben de la Nuez, Art Notes, International Art Magazine 12 2005, Santiago de Compostela. Spain, Print by LITONOR, "Legal Deposit C-2423-2004".
- "From Private wall to private halls", Collecting Art in the Netherlands, By Marty Bax, Produced by Accenture/Stichting Lieve.
- Armando Marino, "In Utero", Photos by Ciuco Gutierrez, Gary Nader Gallery. Miami FL 2001, Gary Nader Editions.
- Itinerarios 2000/2001, VIII Becas de Artes Plasticas, Text by Fernando Castro, Fundacion Marcelino Botin, Printed by Graficas Calima, "Legal Deposit SA-821-2001
- "Der Globale Komplex/The Global Complex", Ok Centrum fur Gegenwartskunst Oberosterreich, Grazer Kunstverein 2002, "ISBN 3-85307-032-9, ISBN 3-902129-04-2", Linz Austria.
- Atravezados, Deslizamientos de identidad y genero, Curated by Menene Graz Balaguer, Fundacion Telefónica Madrid.Spain, Printed by Decision Grafica 2002, ISBN 84-89884-33-1".
- Cuban Avant-garde, Contemporary Cuban Art from the Farber Collection, (From cover Armando Marino), Published by Samuel P Harn Museum of Art, University of, Florida Gainesville 2007, "N6603.2.M46" 2007.
- Post Picasso, Contemporary Reactions, Curated by Michael FitzGeral, Museu Picasso Barcelona, Published by Fundacion Museu Picasso Barcelona, "ISBN 978-84-942319-2-6", 2014.
- Caribbean Art At the Crossroads of the World, Edited by Deborah Cullen and Elvis Fuentes, Published by El Museo del Barrio. New York in association with Yale University Press 2012, "ISBN 978-0-300-17854-8".
- El Museo's Bienal. The (S) Files 2011, Curated by Rocio Aranda Alvarado, Elvis Fuentes and Trinidad Fombella, New York, Printer Amerikom Group.NYC, "ISBN 978-1-882454-02-0", 2011 El Museo del Barrio.
- "In Zicht/ In Sight", Thoughts on the Collection of the Nederandsche Bank, Oplage Edition 2500, Copyright De Nederlandsche Bank NV te Amsterdam 2014.
