= Nelson Ponce Sánchez =

Cuban artist (born 1975)

Nelson Ponce Sanchez was born in 1975, in Alamar (Havana, Cuba). He is an illustrator and graphic designer, especially known for his Vampiros en La Habana (Vampires in Havana) poster, as well as his active participation in the Camaleón collective.

== History ==
Nelson Ponce is a native Habanero. His family moved in Nuevo Vedado when he was 14, and he now lives with his fiancée and her parents in Cayo Hueso (« Bone Key »), Centro Habana.

Nelson Ponce teaches drawing classes in the Casa de las Américas building, and is a professor at the ISDI (Instituto Superior de Diseño Industrial) - where he studied graphic arts when he was younger. Nelson Ponce also worked as a freelance for years.

Among his influences, he mentions Félix Beltran, one of the legends of Cuban poster design who was also a teacher at the ISDI. He also refers to American or Spaniards graphists such as Milton Glaser, David Carson, Javier Mariscal and Isidro Ferrer.

His illustrations have been featured in magazines and children’s books, and he has designed dozens of posters. But there is one in particular that made him famous : the one he created for the film Vampiros en La Habana. Its principle: the first and last letters of the film’s title form bloody fangs under a pair of sinister yellow eyes. This image, famous in Cuba’s design history, has been printed on t-shirts, baseball caps, and even on the capital’s walls.

The turning point in his career came in 2001, when he formed the Camaleón collective with his ancient ISDI students - Idania del Río González, David Alfonso Suárez, Darién Sánchez Castro, and Eduardo Sarmiento -. In 2003, the group did a mural in the student cafeteria of Havana University’s Communications wing, treating of the theme of « miscommunication » : a black-booted figure with a megaphone for a mouth transmits cryptic signals to another figure wearing earmuffs. This work took only one day to paint. Three years later, when the G café was remodeled – the Cuban literary hangout at the intersection of 23rd and G in Vedado -, they reiterated the experience : the group painted, in one day too - and without any brushes - another mural depicting cartoony notion of good and evil.

== Awards and recognition ==
- 2006 : Cuba's Prográfica prize for Best Young Designer.
- Design Award 2013.
