= José Lázaro Vázquez Xene =

Cuban artist (born 1968)

- Born: 1968 (age 57–58); Nueva Gerona, Isla de la Juventud, Cuba
- Occupation: Artist

José Lázaro Vázquez Xene (born 1968 in Nueva Gerona, Isla de la Juventud, Cuba) is a Cuban artist specializing in ceramics and drawing.

== Collective exhibitions ==
His relevant collective exhibitions include the III Feria Nacional de Cerámica, in Nueva Gerona, Isla de la Juventud, Cuba in 1985. He also participated in the III (1993) and IV (1995) Bienal de Cerámica de Pequeño Formato in Amelia Peláez and Castillo de la Real Fuerza in Havana.

In 1995-1996 some of his pieces were selected as part of the first Salón de Arte Cubano Contemporáneo, in the Museo Nacional de Bellas Artes, Havana. In 1996 his works were shown as part of the third Cairo International Biennale for Ceramics at the National Centre for Fine Arts, Cairo, Egypt. Also in 1996 he was included in Panorama de la Cerámica Cubana Contemporánea, part of the XXXVIII Salón Anual Internacional held at the Centro Argentino de Arte Cerámico, Museo Eduardo Sivori, in Buenos Aires, Argentina.

== Awards ==
In 1995 he won a prize at the IV Bienal de Cerámica de Pequeño Formato "Amelia Peláez", Castillo de la Fuerza, Havana.
