= Juan Miguel Rodríguez de la Cruz =

- Born: February 1902; Villa Clara, Cuba
- Died: 1990 (aged 87–88); Havana, Cuba
- Occupation: Artist
- Known for: Ceramics

Juan Miguel Rodríguez de la Cruz (February 1902 – 1990) was a Cuban artist.

== Early life ==
He was born in Villa Clara, Cuba, in February 1902. He became a doctor in the 1920s and was an adjunct professor of Clinical Therapeutics at the University of Havana School of Medicine until 1960.

After World War II, together with Carlos Ramírez Corría, he invested and managed an industrial ceramic plant in Santiago de Las Vegas that was founded in the early 1930s by a Catalan ceramist. This effort failed, but his interest in ceramics was born.

In the early 1950s, he began to learn about ceramics from a Czechoslovak technician who was employed by Industrias Cerámicas Unidas. This was the beginning of the development of artistic ceramics in Cuba. Painters of the 1950s including Amelia Peláez, Portocarrero, Wifredo Lam and others joined the effort. Dr. Rodriguez de la Cruz provided the materials and painters began experimenting with ceramics as an art expression. In 1953 the mural by Amelia Peláez, Marta Arjona, Mirta García Buch and Rebeca Robes, was installed at the front wall of the former Tribunal de Cuentas building (today the Ministry of the Interior). It was designed, painted and baked in Dr. Rodriguez de la Cruz' art studio in Santiago de Las Vegas. In the eighties, he was Technical Advisor in ceramics at the Isla de la Juventud, Cuba.

== Individual exhibitions ==
A solo exhibition took place in 1954 at the Lyceum, Havana. In 1982, he presented his show titled Rodríguez de la Cruz. Fuego y arte at the Galería Amelia Peláez in Havana. In 1988 he presented a retrospective exhibition of his works at the Galería Plaza Vieja, Fondo Cubano de Bienes Culturales in Havana. Today there is an exhibit of his ceramic work and that of Cuban painters at the Castillo de la Fuerza museum in "old Havana."

== Collective exhibitions ==
His pieces were shown in 1955 under the name "Painting, Sculpture, and Applied Arts of Cuba" in Tampa, at the Progress Fair. In 1986, his works were displayed in the show Artesanía Cubana 1986 at the Museo Nacional de Bellas Artes, Havana.

Many of his pieces were given as gifts to visiting government dignitaries by the Revolutionary Government.
