= Miguel Cubiles =

- Born: 21 November 1937; Caibarién, Las Villas, Cuba
- Died: 17 March 2005 (aged 67); Mexico City, Mexico

Miguel Cubiles (born Miguel Cubiles y de la Rosa on 21 November 1937 in Caibarién, Las Villas, Cuba) is a Cuban-Mexican artist, specializing in paintings, ceramics and engravings.

Cubiles went into exile in 1961 and studied art at Miami-Dade College (then known as Miami-Dade Community College) and at the University of Miami.

== Individual exhibitions ==
He has had many exhibitions. He has been shown at the Interamericas Art Gallery in Coral Gables, Florida in 1981. In 1983, he presented his works at Proarte, Mexico City, Mexico; and in 1987 exhibited his paintings in Interamerican Art Gallery, Interamerican Center at Miami Dade College, in Miami. His last exhibit was on 14 October 2004 at the Museo Jose Luis Cuevas in Mexico City.

== Collective exhibitions ==
He was part of many collective exhibitions. In collective exhibitions, he has presented his works in Koubeck Memorial Center, University of Miami, Coral Gables, Florida, 1975, in Royal Trust Tower, Miami, Florida, U.S.A, 1982, and at the Museo de Arte Contemporáneo (now the Centro Andaluz de Arte Contemporáneo) in Seville, Spain in 1986. He also participated in the IX Bienal Internacional de Arte at Valparaíso, Chile in 1989; and at the International Biennale of Painting in Košice, Slovakia in 1994.

== Awards ==
Cubiles received the Cintas Foundation award for art in 1986.

== Permanent collections ==
His art works can be found in the permanent collections of the Fundació Joan Miró in Barcelona, Spain; the Japan Printmakers Association in Tokyo, Japan; the Museo de Arte y Cultura in Mexico City, Mexico; the Instituto de Cultura Puertorriqueña in San Juan, Puerto Rico; the Museo Rufino Tamayo in Mexico City, Mexico; and the Miami-Dade County Public Library in Miami, Florida.
