= Williams Carmona =

Cuban painter

Williams Carmona is a Cuban painter. He was born in Havana, Cuba, in 1967. In the early 1990s he moved to Puerto Rico. He has works in a number of museums including the Museum of Latin American Art (MOLAA). Williams Carmona has exhibited worldwide, most notably at Philippe Hoerle-Guggenheim's HG Contemporary Gallery in New York “More Was Lost in Cuba / Mas Se Perdió en Cuba,”.

Exhibitions

- 2016: “More Was Lost in Cuba / Mas Se Perdió en Cuba”
