= Luis Vega De Castro =

Cuban artist (born 1944)

Luis Vega De Castro (born October 4, 1944 in Havana, Cuba) is a Cuban artist. Since 1980 he has lived in Miami, Florida, United States. He works in graphic design, painting, drawing and illustration, and has been noted for his work in film posters.

== Education ==
He studied in the Escuela Nacional de Bellas Artes San Alejandro, Havana, Cuba. In 1979, he received his degree in Art History, from Havana University, Havana, Cuba.

== Exhibitions ==
=== Individual exhibitions ===
- Among his must relevant personal exhibitions was the 1973, Los Expedicionarios, Exposición de Carteles de Pedro Damián, Jorge Dimas y Luis Vega, Sala Rubén Martínez Villena, Galería UNEAC in Havana.
- 1984 “Tertulias San Miguel” Coral Gables, Florida.
- 1985 “Luis Vega” en Key Biscayne Library, Key Biscayne, Florida.
- 1997 “Elite Fine Art” Coral Gables, Florida.
- 1999 “Elite Fine Art” Coral Gables, Florida.
- 2002 “Elite Fine Art” Coral Gables, Florida.
- 2004 “First Bank of Miami” Coral Gables, Florida.
- 2007 “Sueños y Realidades” Prado Fine Art Collection Gallery, Coral Gables, Florida.
- 2010 “Galería Artis” Universidad Autónoma Metropolitana, México DF.

=== Collective exhibitions ===
- 1970 “Cuba Alegre como su Sol” (sponsored by Mario Paioti), Florencia, Italia.
- 1973 He was included in the Iér Festival International d' Affiches du Cinema, XXVIème Festival International du Film, in Cannes, France.
- 1976 VI International Poster Biennale Warsaw, Galería Zaçheta, Varsovia, Polonia.
- 1979 He was one of the selected artist to conform “1000 Carteles Cubanos de Cine. 20 Años de la Cinematografía Cubana” in the Museo Nacional de Bellas Artes, La Habana.
- 1981 "Hispanic Week", Association of Art Critics and Commentators, Miami, Florida
- 1982 "Roots", University of Miami, Miami, Florida.
- 1982 "XXI Premi International de Dibuix Joan Miro", Spain.
- 1982 "Association of Art Critics and Commentators", Miami, Florida.
- 1983 "Calle Ocho Open House", Miami, Florida.
- 1983 "Arts Day", Tallahassee, Florida.
- 1983 "7th Annual Hialeah Showcase Art Show, Hialeah, Florida.
- 1984 "A Tribute to Hispanic Art in Miami", Circle Gallery, Miami, Florida.
- 1984 "Vision" North Dade Library, Miami, Florida.
- 1985 "Alloyage 85", SIBI Cultural Center, Miami, Florida.
- 1986 "Local Cuban Artists" Cristissa Art Gallery, Miami, Florida.
- 1986 "Le Petit Format, A Group Show" SIBI Cultural Center, Miami, Florida.
- 1986 "Today's Hispanic Art", De Armas Gallery, Miami, Florida.
- 1987 "Latin American Drawing", The Art Institute of Chicago, Chicago, Illinois.
- 1987 Banco Interamericano de Desarrollo, Washington D. C.
- 1987 "Cintas Fellows Revisited a Decade After", Metro Dade Cultural Center, Miami, Florida.
- 1990 "Five from Miami", St. Petersburg, Florida.
- 1994 "Latin American Spectrum", Elite Fine Art, Coral Gables, Florida.
- 1995 "Absolut Mariel", South Florida Art Center, Miami Beach, Florida.
- 1996 "Latin American Spectrum", Elite Fine Art, Coral Gables, Florida.
- 1997 " Design for Life", Cooper-Hewitt National Design Museum, Smithsonian Institution, New York, New York.
- 1997 "Summer Group Show", Elit Fine Art, Coral Gables, Florida.
- 1998 "Latin American Spectrum", Elite Fine Art, Coral Gables, Florida.
- 1999 "Summer Group Show", Elit Fine Art, Coral Gables, Florida.
- 1999 "Cuba Nostalgia", Coconut Grove Convention Center, Miami, Florida.
- 2000 "Summer Group Show", Elit Fine Art, Coral Gables, Florida.
- 2000 "Cuba Nostalgia", Coconut Grove Convention Center, Miami, Florida.
- 2000 "20 Years of Art on the Diaspora", 0 & Y Gallery, Miami, Florida.
- 2001 "Latin American Spectrum", Elite Fine Art, Coral Gables, Florida.
- 2001 "Places in the Heart", The Art Center, St. Petersburg, Florida.
- 2002 "Summer Group Show", Elit Fine Art, Coral Gables, Florida.
- 2004 "Artistic Development and Iberoamerican Integration", One Brickell Square, Miami, Florida.
- 2004 "Contemporary & Modern Artist" Oñate Fine Art, Miami, Florida.
- 2010 "Farewell to the sea: Remembering el Mariel, Zu Galería, Miami, Florida.

== Awards ==
During his life he has obtained many awards and recognitions, including:

- 1972 First Prize in a Poster Contest "La Mujer en América Latina", Cuba.
- 1972 First Prize in Poster Contest "Protección e Higiene al Trabajo", Cuba.
- 1981 First Prize in "Contemporary Drawing", Association of Art Critics and Commentators, Miami, Florida.
- 1982 "Best of Show", Calle Ocho Open House, Miami, Florida.
- 1983 "ARLIS Award", New York Chapter, Art Library Society of North America, New York, New York.
- 1983 "Best of Show", Calle Ocho Open House, Miami, Florida.
- 1983 "Best of Show", 7th Annual Hialeah Showcase Art Show, Hialeah, Florida.
- 1984 First Prize in "Graphis" 8th Annual Hialeah Showcase Art Show, Hialeah, Florida, Primer premio.
- 1984-1985 He has been awarded with the "Cintas Fellowship", New York, New York.
- 1985 First Prize in "Addys Award", Miami Film Festival, Miami, Florida, Primer premio.
- 1989 He obtained the "Angel Award" Miami, Florida.

== Collections ==
His works are included in relevant collections such as:

- Cintas Foundation, New York City, U.S.
- Instituto Cubano del Arte e Industria Cinematográficos (ICAIC), Havana, Cuba
- Museo Nacional de Bellas Artes, Havana, Cuba
- "Banco Interamericano de Desarrollo (BID)", Washington D. C., U.S.
- "Transatlantic Bank", Miami, Florida, U.S.
- "Lowe Art Museum", University of Miami, Coral Gables, Florida, U.S.
- "Universidad Autónoma Metropolitana" Mexico D. F., Mexico
