= Idania del Río =

Cuban designer and graphic artist

- del Río in 2015
- Born: 1981 (age 44–45); Havana, Cuba
- Known for: Graphic design, fashion design

Idania del Río (born 1981) is a Cuban designer and graphic artist based in Havana, Cuba. She attended the Instituto Superior de Diseño Industrial (Higher Institute of Industrial Design) in Havana and graduated with a degree in Graphic Design and Visual Communication in 2004.

Del Río's poster art has been featured in Cuban and international exhibitions, including designer Daniel Ryan Smith's 2007-2008 Seattle-Havana Poster Show, and Cuban curator Agapito Martínez's 2009 Ghost Posters and 2011 Últimas Escenas exhibits.

Del Río opened Clandestina, the first independently-run Cuban design shop, in Old Havana with Spanish business partner Leire Fernández in February 2015. She was part of a group of Cuban business owners which met with U.S. President Barack Obama during his visit to Havana in April 2016.

== Work ==
Idania del Rio opened Clandestina in 2015, which sells T-shirts, handbags and posters with a unique slant on modern Cuban life, bearing slogans such as "Actually I'm in Havana" and "99% diseño cubano" (99% Cuban design). Clandestina is Cuba's first independent clothing brand, and a collective of designers, artists, and creators. All of its products are designed by a team of artists based in Old Havana. Clandestina is also the first Cuban brand to sell online to the rest of the world. Its products are designed in Cuba, but they are sourced, made and sold in the United States.

== Awards ==
In December 2024, Idania del Rio was included on the BBC's 100 Women list.
