= Maria Emilia Castagliola =

Cuban artist (b. 1946)

María Emilia Castagliola
- Born: 1946 (age 78–79); Havana, Cuba
- Education: University of South Florida
- Known for: Painter
- Notable work: A Matter of Trust
- Style: Conceptual
- Awards: Fellowship Award from Art Matter Inc.

María Emilia Castagliola (born 1946) is a Cuban-American painter and conceptual artist. She is also known by the name Maria Faedo. Born in Havana, Cuba, she immigrated to the United States in 1961. Her early work stressed her Cuban roots with the use of Catholic and Renaissance icons; her more recent projects have been installation and community-based.

== Biography ==
Castagliola has a B.A. degree in sociology, in addition to B.F.A and M.F.A degrees from the University of South Florida. She has taught art, as an assistant professor, at the same university.

Castagliola has a background in social services and religion. Her early work synthesized her Cuban roots with Catholic and Renaissance icons, but she also tried to incorporate personal things in her artwork. She then moved on towards installation and community-based projects. Castagliola discusses that it is within her work that we can see and comprehend her bicultural dichotomy. She focuses her artwork on Latin American traditions and incorporates Spanish and religious icons that were present or significant in her childhood. Maria Emilia Castagliola considers herself to be an "outsider" even though she works in the mainstream.

== Artworks ==
=== A Matter of Trust (1994) ===
A Matter of Trust is an artwork that was created by Castagliola in 1994. She arranged ordinary paper envelopes in quilt patterns of triangles, rectangles, and squares in order to create an artwork that represented intimacy and trust. Castagliolas's friends and family members provided her with their deepest personal secrets, and she then sewed them shut inside the envelope.

=== In Praise of Federico Garcia Lorca (2001) ===
Castagliola used Federico Garcia Lorca's work "verbal launch pads" for a collection of paintings exhibited in the Gulf Coast Museum of Art in 2001.

== Exhibitions ==
- Tampa Museum of Art, Florida, solo exhibition. (1993)
- Museum of Contemporary Art, University of South Florida, "Layers: Between Science and the Imagination" (1998)
- Museum of Fine Arts, St. Petersburg, Florida, "Sources of Pride" (2005)
- Renwick Gallery, The Smithsonian American Art Museum, “Subversive, Skilled, Sublime: Fiber Art by Women” (2024-2025)

== Collections ==
- Smithsonian American Art Museum, "A Matter of Trust" (1994) and " The Birthing Album (1994).

== Publications ==
- Maria Emilia Castagliola: In Praise of Federico Garcia Lorca, with Jose Martinez-Canas (Gulf Coast Museum of Art, 2001)
