= Museo Nacional de Bellas Artes de La Habana =

Art museum in Havana, Cuba

Coordinates: 23°8′24.8″N 82°21′25.9″W

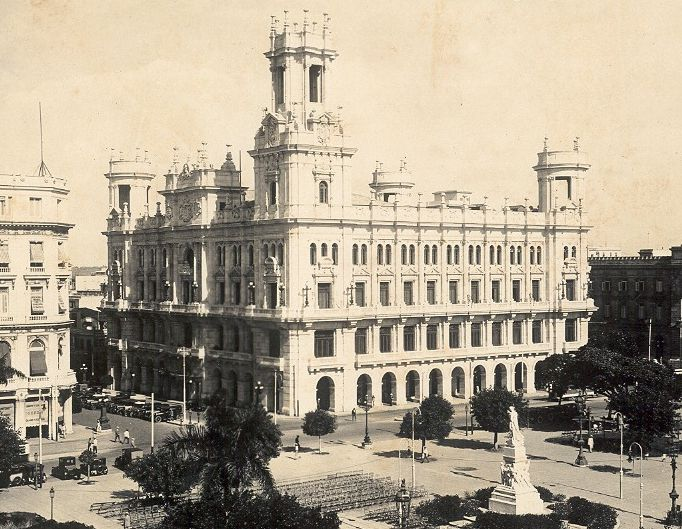
- Museo Nacional de Bellas Artes de La Habana in 1920.
- Interactive map of the Museo Nacional de Bellas Artes de La Habana area

General information
- Location: Palace of the Asturian Center - San Rafael, e/Zulueta y Monserrate, Palace of Fine Arts: Trocadero Street e/Zulueta y Monserrate; Palace of the Asturian Center - San Rafael, e/Zulueta y Monserrate, Old Havana, Havana, Cuba
- Opened: February 23, 1913

Design and construction
- Designations: Fine arts museum

Website
- http://www.bellasartes.co.cu

The National Museum of Fine Arts of Havana (Museo Nacional de Bellas Artes de La Habana) in Havana, Cuba, is a museum of fine arts that exhibits Cuban art collections from the colonial times up to contemporary generations.

== History ==
It was founded on February 23, 1913, due to the efforts of its first director, Emilio Heredia, a well-known architect. After frequent moves it was finally placed on the block once occupied by the old Colon Market. In 1954, a new Palacio de Bellas Artes was opened, designed by the architect Rodriguez Pichardo.

== Overview ==
There are now two buildings belonging to the museum, one dedicated to Cuban art in the Palacio de Bellas Artes and one dedicated to the universal art, in the Palacio del Centro Asturiano.

The Palacio de Bellas Artes (Palace of Fine Arts) is dedicated exclusively to housing Cuban art collections. Spanning the 17th and 19th centuries, it has rooms devoted to landscape, religious subjects and the Costumbrismo narrative scenes of Cuban life. A gallery devoted to the 1970s is marked by a preponderance of Hyperrealism and the latest generation of Cuban artists whose works all reflect the strong symbolic imagery that has been prevalent in recent decades. The most notable works are those of René Portocarrero and Wifredo Lam. A modernist sculpture by the noted Cuban artist Rita Lonja stands outside the main entrance.

Other Cuban artists on display include Leopoldo Romañach, Víctor Manuel, Federico Beltrán Masses, Rafael Lillo, Jose A. Bencomo Mena, Manuel Vega, Domingo Ramos, Guillermo Collazo, Mariano Rodriguez, Carlos Enríquez Gómez and Jorge Arche.

The Palacio del Centro Asturiano, built in 1927 by the architect Manuel Bustos, houses European paintings and sculptures, along with a collection of ancient art. Originally, it was a club for natives of the Spanish province of Asturias and, after the 1959 Revolution, it housed the Supreme Court of Justice.

== Gallery ==
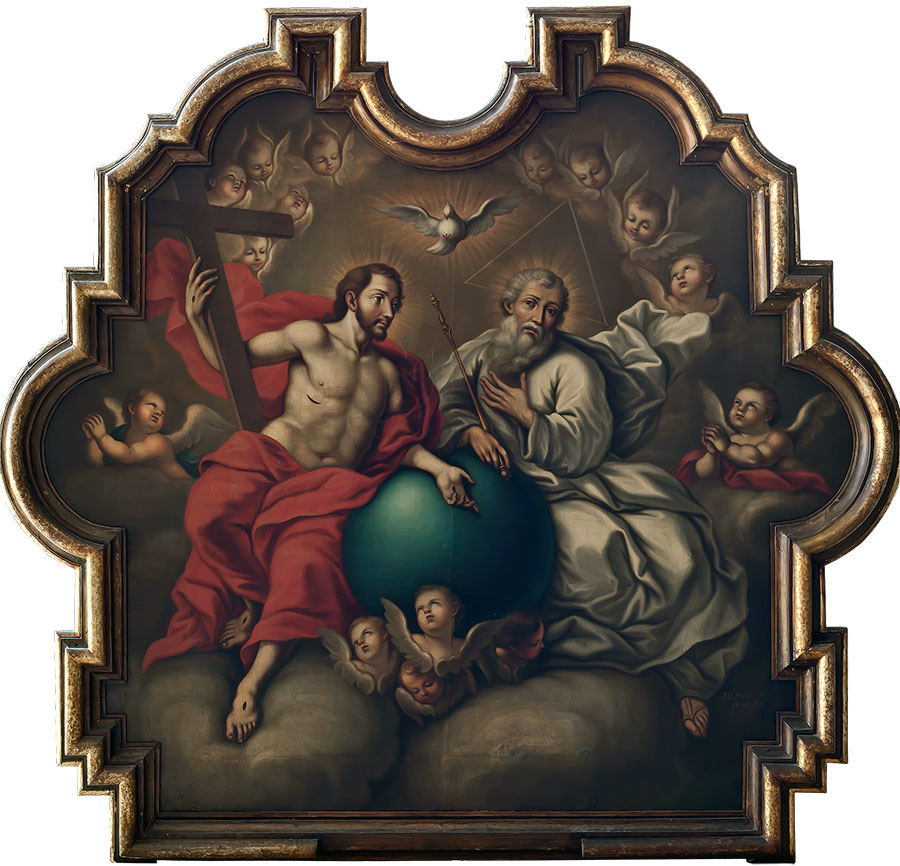
José Nicolás de la Escalera - The Holy Trinity, 18th century.

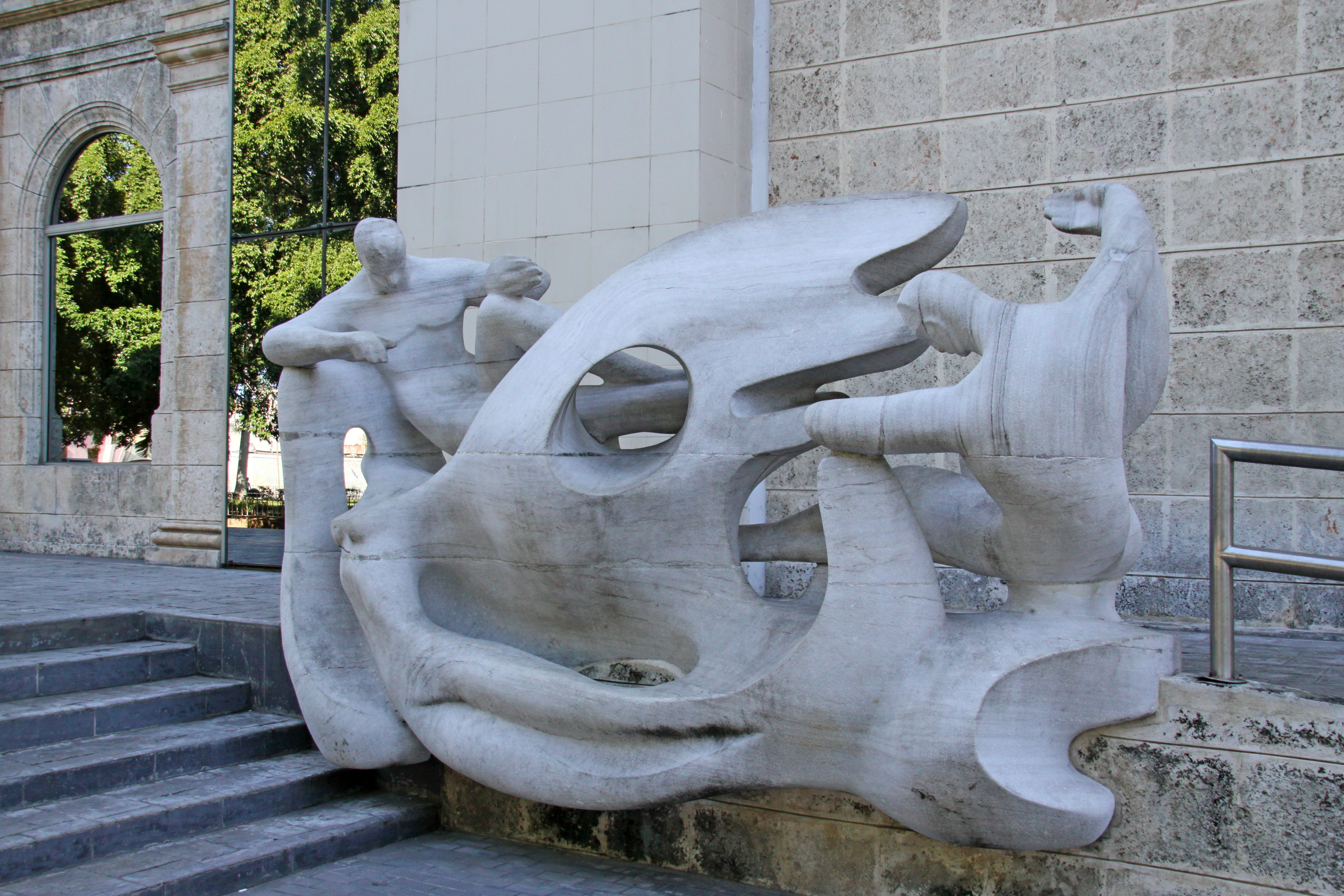
Forma, Espacio y Luz, sculpture of Rita Longa at the main entrance.

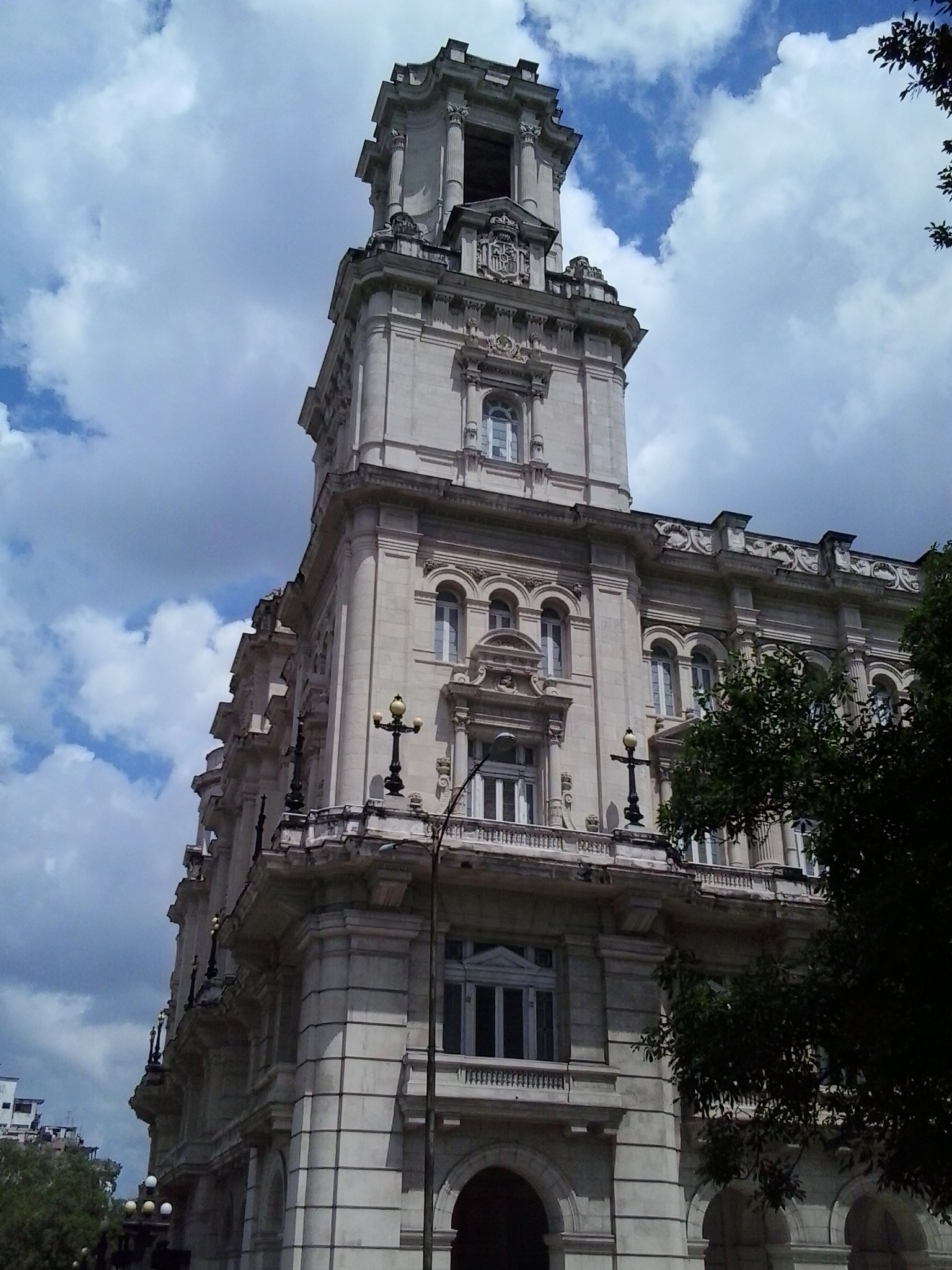
One of the towers of the museum

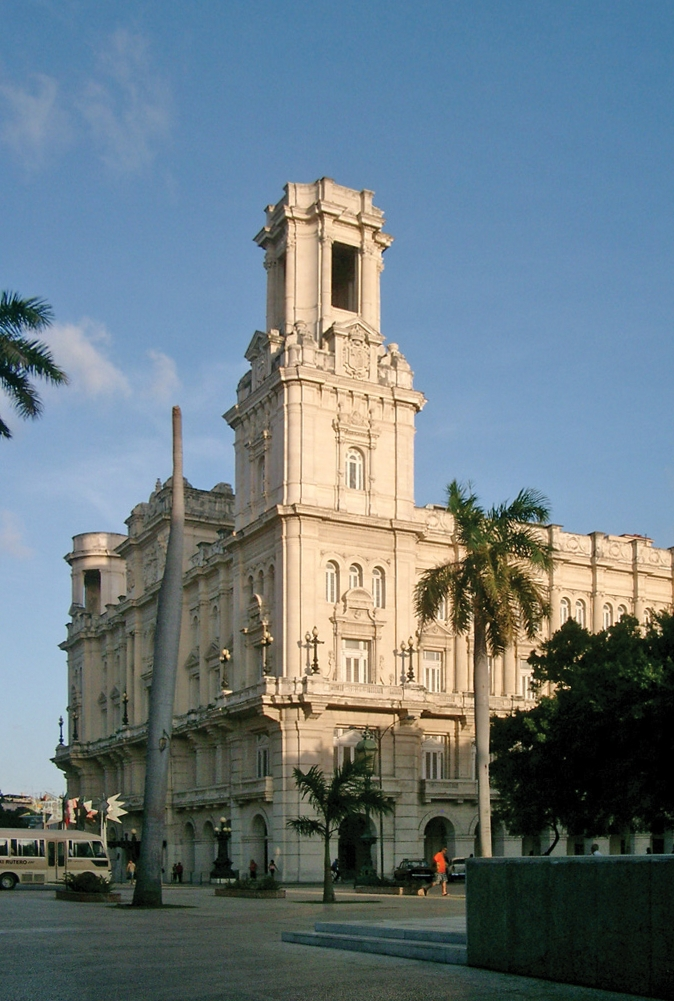

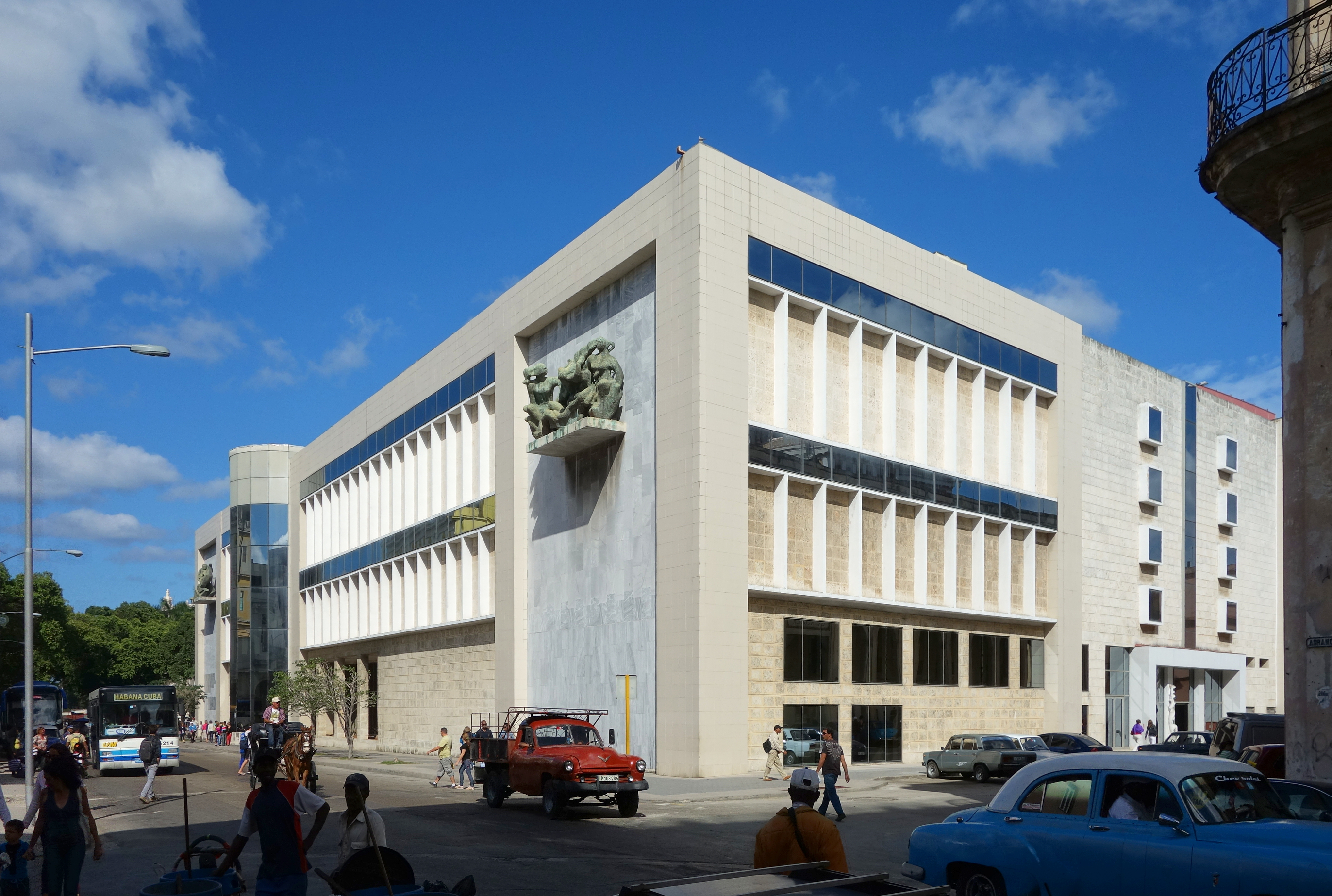
The new museum headquarters made in 1954.

== See also ==
- List of museums in Cuba
