= List of Cuban painters =

The following is a list of Cuban painters.

== Colonial Period (1750s–1902) ==
- Miguel Arias Bardou
- Guillermo Collazo
- José Nicolás de la Escalera
- Vicente Escobar
- Víctor Patricio de Landaluze
- José Abreu Morell
- Giuseppe Perovani
- José Joaquín Tejada

== Early Republic (1902–1950s) ==
- Antonio Sanchez Araujo
- Pastor Argudín Pedroso
- Armando Menocal
- Antonio Rodriguez Morey
- Leopoldo Romañach

== The Vanguard (1880s–1920s) ==
- Eduardo Abela
- Cundo Bermúdez
- Víctor Manuel García Valdés
- Antonio Gattorno
- Wifredo Lam
- Fidelio Ponce de León
- Amelia Peláez
- Marcelo Pogolotti
- René Portocarrero
- Carlos Enriquez Gomez
- Juan Ramon Valdez Gomez

== The Moderns ==
- José Bernal
- Hugo Consuegra
- Agustín Cárdenas
- Mario Carreño
- Consuelo Castañeda
- Rolando López Dirube
- Antonia Eiriz
- Agustín Fernández (artist)
- Lourdes Gomez Franca
- Ángel Acosta León
- Raúl Martínez
- José María Mijares
- Servando Cabrera Moreno
- Dionisio Perkins
- José Rodríguez Fuster
- Loló Soldevilla
- Rafael Soriano (painter)

== Contemporary ==
=== A–M ===
- Jeannine Achón
- Astrid Alcayaga
- Ana Albertina Delgado Álvarez
- Angel Delgado Fuentes
- Baruj Salinas
- José Bedia Valdés
- Julio Breff
- Adriano Buergo
- Luis Enrique Camejo
- Humberto Castro
- Rafael Consuegra
- Xavier Cortada
- José Ramón Díaz Alejandro
- Ofill Echevarria
- Carlos Estévez (artist)
- Roberto Fabelo
- Emilio Falero
- Miguel Fleitas
- Juan Gonzalez
- Josignacio
- Kcho
- Julio Larraz
- Roel Caboverde Llacer
- Rubén Torres Llorca
- Luis Marín
- Juan T. Vázquez Martín
- Manuel Mendive

=== N–Z ===
- Adriano Nicot
- Pedro Pablo Oliva
- Gina Pellón
- Sandra Ramos
- Roberto Álvarez Ríos
- Miguel Rodez
- Emilio Hector Rodriguez
- Juan Andrés Rodríguez – known as El Monje
- Gilberto Andrés Romero Pino
- José Ángel Rosabal Fajardo
- Zilia Sánchez Domínguez
- Tomás Sánchez
- Cesar Santos
- Raul Santoserpa
- Jesús Selgas Cepero
- José Omar Torres López
- Carlos Trillo Name
- Zafra
- Juan Ramon Valdez Gomez
- Fernando Velázquez Vigil
- Pedro Vizcaíno
- Rafael Zarza Gonzalez

== See also ==
- Cuban art
- List of Cuban artists
- Lists of painters by nationality
