= Adriano Nicot =

Cuban artist (born 1964)

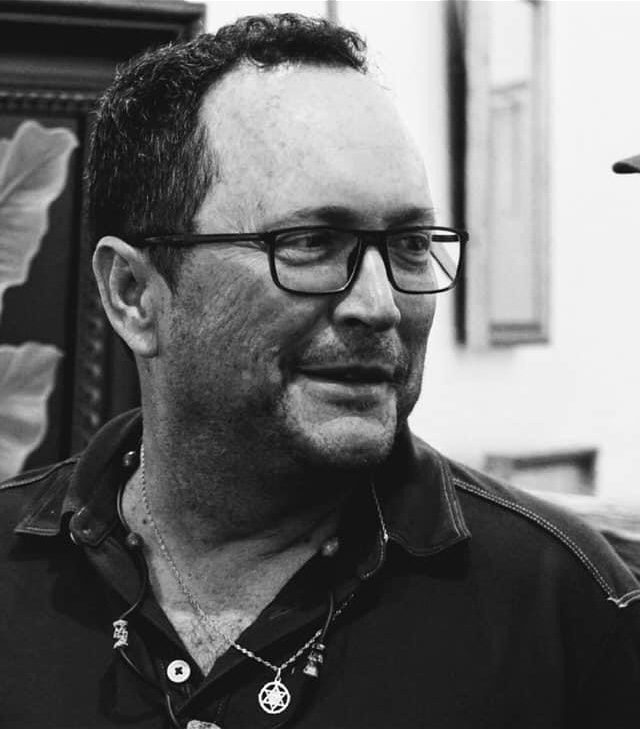
- Adriano Nicot at an art exhibition in Miami, Florida circa 2019.
- Born: Adriano Adolfo Fernandez Nicot; October 9, 1964; Havana, Cuba
- Education: Academia de San Alejandro
- Occupations: Visual artist, poet
- Known for: Cuban Neoexpressionist painting
- Notable work: Donde el Alma se te Quiebra, La Bella de Alhambra, Portraits series, Minotaur series
- Movement: Neo-expressionism

Adriano Adolfo Fernandez Nicot is a Cuban-American painter and poet based in Miami, Florida. He is known for a distinctive Neo-Expressionist style and is closely associated with the prominent Cuban artists Antonia Eiriz, Manuel Vidal Fernández, and Hilda Vidal Valdés. After becoming established in Cuba, Nicot relocated to the United States in the late 1990s. His work has since been featured in several books, exhibitions, and institutional collections in the US and in Latin America.

== Background and early life ==
Nicot was born on October 9, 1964, in Havana, Cuba during the early years following the Cuban Revolution. His parents were both born in Cuba and shared recent European backgrounds. His father, Adriano Adolfo Fernández Santarén, was a Cuban financier from Havana whose parents arrived in Cuba from Leon, Spain. His mother, Margarita Nicot Verdecia, was a computer programmer born in Guantanamo, Cuba of French ancestry that had migrated to Puerto Rico before arriving in Cuba. His French heritage from his mother's family is significant for his descendance from Jean Nicot, after whom Nicotine is named. Per Spanish naming customs, both his paternal and maternal family names are used with his mother's family name appearing last. As he pursued his artistic career, his name would be simplified accordingly and he became known professionally as Adriano Nicot.

Nicot displayed an interest and inclination toward the arts early in his childhood and was supported by his parents in his artistic pursuits. In interviews Nicot has recounted that he began actively drawing and sketching by the age of five, after which his father would regularly provide him with sketching paper." A key moment in his artistic development came when Nicot was eight years old and had been found to draw on a wall of their residence. When asked by his father why he did this when he had ample sketching paper, Nicot explained that his artistic ideas were of too large a scale to convey on paper. Following this incident, Nicot’s father believed he had deeper potential as an artist and his parents subsequently enrolled him in art classes in Cuba’s Biblioteca Nacional later that year. There he began his formal training in the arts studying both art history as well as painting and sketching techniques. Another significant artistic influence in Nicot's early artistic development were his regular visits with his grandfather to the residence of famed Cuban artist René Portocarrero. There Nicot would observe his works and then attempt to imitate their styles after returning from the visits.

== Art career ==
Following his regular studies at the Biblioteca Nacional, Nicot was also mentored by several prominent Cuban artists, including Antonia Eiriz and Manuel Vidal Fernández, both closely affiliated with the influential "Los Once" (The Eleven) art group, as well as Vidal's second wife Hilda Vidal Valdes. Eiriz, a leading Cuban Expressionist, was a particularly strong influence on Nicot and the development of his own style. Eiriz was a neighbor of his in Havana and Nicot would visit her home regularly for private lessons in painting.

In addition to Nicot's association with Eiriz, the Vidals would also play a significant role in Nicot gaining visibility in his early career. Manuel Vidal first discovered Nicot when he encountered him sketching outdoors in Havana. After being impressed with his work, Vidal bought him canvases and used his network to help Nicot enroll into Cuba's premier fine arts educational institution, the Academy of San Alejandro, where he participated in the academy's Proyecto de Acción Integrada Cultural “Persona." As well-established figures in Cuba's visual arts community, the Vidals also helped secure and support Nicot's first solo and collective exhibitions and would exhibit alongside him to draw further attention. Manuel Vidal wrote the foreword to the catalog of Nicot's September 1994 exhibition Encuentros Cercanos while Hilda first exhibited alongside him the following year in the exhibition Mujer Multiple at Havana's Palacio de Convenciones. Also in 1994, Nicot was commissioned to paint a public art mural in the Casa de Cultura Centro in Havana. Another prominent instructor of Nicot was Belkis Ayon, who taught him engraving.

By the end of 1995 Nicot had graduated from the Academy of San Alejandro with majors in painting and engraving and had exhibited with both Vidals, Eiriz, and several other leading Cuban artists of the time. This would draw the attention of critics, gallerists, as well as collectors and pave the way to a string of exhibitions, his first awards, as well as further public art commissions before the close of the decade. Following the success of his early exhibitions, Nicot received a pair of scenographic commissions in 1998 for the Havana theatrical stage productions Mandragora (directed by Miguel Montesco) and Blue Moon (directed by Fernando Quinones). In the Cuba period of his career, Nicot became a member of several influential arts institutions such as the Fondo Cubano de Bienes Culturales, La Brigada Hermanos Saiz, and also served as an arts instructor at the Centro Cultural de Yara.

Nicot and his family relocated to Miami in 1999 during Cuba's special period due to the political-artistic repression and censorship of the Castro regime. Upon relocating to South Florida, Nicot and his family joined the Cuban Exile Community and he immediately immersed himself in the robust Latin American art market of the region. After relocating to the United States, Nicot would become among the region's well-established fine art figures and continue exhibiting extensively, earning additional awards internationally, and other visibility for his art and creative projects, including the publication of his poetry.

In November 2020, Nicot proposed and initiated the “Brose Forever” group exhibition in honor of the late Cuban actress Broselianda Hernández to mark the first anniversary of her death. The exhibition was hosted and organized the following year by the Arte Libre group in collaboration with the North Miami Beach Library. “Brose Forever” featured over 40 international artists, including Nicot, from the United States, Cuba, Spain, Mexico, Argentina, Venezuela, Colombia, Chile, Uruguay, and Pakistan.

In 2021 Nicot participated in the nonprofit HATT Foundation’s fine art auction with artwork valued in excess of $13,000. The fundraiser was in support of the foundation's mission to assist under-served and at-risk children, underprivileged families, and senior citizens based in Florida.

In 2022 Nicot was selected to be featured in the Pompano Beach Cultural Center's Culture and Identity of Our America collective exhibition. The exhibition opened on October 14 as part of the Center's Hispanic Heritage Month activities in collaboration with the Latin American Art Pavilion (LAAP).

In 2024 Nicot was selected to participate in the high profile Flora & Fauna exhibition, held in the former Gulf Coast Museum of Art in Largo, making it Nicot's first exhibition in Tampa Bay. Funded in part by the National Endowment for the Arts, Flora & Fauna also featured other prominent artists including Josignacio and Edel Alvarez Galban, and received coverage from The Artisan Magazine and Diario Las Americas, as well as television coverage.

In December 2024 Nicot participated in the Art Basel-affiliated collective exhibition Forbidden Fruit. Held during Miami Art Week 2024, the event was also notable for being the world's largest documented exhibition of Cuban erotic art, spanning four generations of artists. Following the exhibition opening, Nicot's featured works were accepted into the permanent collection of the World Erotic Art Museum (WEAM) in Miami Beach.

In 2025 Nicot produced the cover artwork for the poetry collection Con los pies en la tierra by Rolando Lorie, recipient of the 2017 Silver Pen from Entre Líneas Publications and past honoree of the UNESCO Cultural Center (2015) and the International Latino Book Awards (2022).

== Selected exhibitions ==
Nicot has been highly active in exhibiting his art at a range of venues and has participated in over sixty solo and collective art exhibitions in Cuba, the United States, and Peru since launching his professional art career in the early 1990s. Nicot's first solo exhibitions were the pair of shows titled La Violencia de las Horas I & II (The Violence of the Hours) at Havana's Galeria Kahlo. The foreword to this first exhibition (Part I) was written by another notable Cuban art figure, Carlos Guzman, director of Havana's Galeria Kahlo. As a member of the UNEAC, Manuel Vidal wrote the foreword to the catalog of Nicot's September 1994 exhibition Encuentros Cercanos (Close Encounters).

Throughout his exhibition career Nicot has exhibited with several other notable Latin American artists, including Antonia Eiriz, Manuel Vidal, Hilda Vidal, Josignacio, Tomas Sanchez, Zaida del Rio, José Bedia, Belkis Ayon, Yamilet Sempe, Emilio Hector Rodriguez, Sandra Ceballos, Clara Morera, Carlos Artime, Miguel Fleitas, Miguel Rodez, Edel Alvarez Galban, and others. He has been curated by Hortensia Montero, Anthony Ardavin, Niten, Ana Juncadella Barbosa and David Fernández among others.

Since relocating to the United States Nicot has exhibited throughout Central and South Florida as well as in Connecticut and internationally in Cusco, Peru. He has also exhibited in high-profile venues such as Art Basel Miami, the Ritz Carlton Hotel, and the Coral Gables Museum.

=== Selected individual exhibitions ===
- 2017 Rompiendo Marcos, Sarracino Gallery, Coral Gables, Florida, US
- 2010 Absolute Adriano, Logo Projects in conjunction with Ocean Ophthalmology Group, Miami, FL, US.
- 2009 Diego Quispe Tito, Sala de Exposiciones Mariano Fuentes Lira de la Escuela Superior Autonoma de Bellas Artes, Cusco, Peru
- 2009 Current Works, Bakehouse Art Complex, Swenson Gallery, Miami, Florida, US.
- 2001 Current Works, Blue Angel Gallery, Miami, Florida, US.
- 1996 La Expresion del Jazz, Galeria Casa de la Cultura de Plaza, Havana, Cuba.
- 1995 Encuentros Cercanos (I & II), Galeria Arte 7 & Centro Cultural Cinematografico Yara, Havana, Cuba.
- 1994 La Violencia de las Horas (I & II), Galeria Kahlo and Facultad Internacional de Cine Radio y Television del Instituto Superior de Arte, Havana Cuba.

=== Selected collective exhibitions ===
- 2025, Forbidden Fruit, Wilzig Museum, Miami Beach, Florida, US
- 2024, Flora & Fauna, The Gallery at Creative Pinellas, Largo, Florida, US
- 2023, Roots of an Identity, Baily Contemporary Arts Center (BaCA) and Latin American Art Pavilion (LAAP), Pompano Beach, Florida, US
- 2022,Culture and Identity of Our America, Pompano Beach Cultural Center, Pompano Beach, Florida, US
- 2018 Rooster, Gallo, Galo, Gallus, Milander Center for Art and Entertainment, Hialeah, Florida, US
- 2017 Obrapia Art Gallery, Miami, Florida, US
- 2017 3 en el Bunker, The Bunker, Coral Ridge, Florida, US
- 2016 La Mano Hispana, Milander Center for Art and Entertainment, Hialeah, Florida, US
- 2016 For the Love of Art, Douglas Historic Building, Coral Gables, Florida, US
- 2016 IART1 Gallery, Coral Gables, FL, US
- 2015 Victor Clarke Recital Hall, Coral Gables, Florida, US
- 2015 The Car, The Culture, Amstrong Ford of Homestead, Florida, US
- 2014 Latin Views, A Biennal Exhibition, Alexey von Schlippe Gallery of Art, Groton, Connecticut, US
- 2014 IF – THEN, Galeria Xinqo, Art Basel 2014, North Miami, Florida, US.
- 2014 Manifest/Destiny, Little Haiti Cultural Center, Miami, Florida, US.
- 2014 I Will Walk for You, Coral Gables Museum, Coral Gables, Florida, US.
- 2014 Synergy: Artists in Collaboration, MDC Galleries of Art + Design, Kendall, Florida, US.
- 2013 More than Meets the Eye, The Art Link, Art Basel 2013, Miami, FL USA
- 2013 Galeria Xinqo, North Miami, Florida, US.
- 2012 Litte Haiti Cultural Center, Miami, Florida, US.
- 2012 ArtCenter / South Florida, Miami Beach, Florida, US.
- 2011 LZ Fine Art Galeria, North Miami, Florida, US.
- 2011 Caridi Gallery, North Miami, FL, US.
- 2010 Arte X Comida, Leal's Fine Art Gallery, Miami, Florida, US.
- 2010 Lucky You! 2, Bakehouse Art Complex, Miami, Florida, US.
- 2009 Masters’ Mystery Art Show 2009, Ritz Carlton Hotel, Miami Beach, FL, US.
- 2009 Semana Binacional de Salud de las Americas, Osorio Arts & Graphics, North Miami, Florida, US.
- 2009 Grand Opening of The Children's Gallery and Art Center, Inc., Homestead, Florida, US.
- 2009 Human Image and Portrait, Art Expressions Gallery, Fort Lauderdale, Florida, US.
- 2008 Galeria Xinqo, The Revenge of Abstraction, North Miami, Florida, US.
- 2008 8 on 8, Maria Sonia Martin Art Gallery, Miami, Florida, US.
- 2008 World Artistic Spirits at NOMI, North Miami Public Library, North Miami, Florida, US.
- 2008 Collective Exhibits of Cuban Painters, Ancient Times Gallery, Miami, Florida, US.
- 2008 Masters’ Mystery Art Show 2008, Ritz Carlton Hotel, Miami Beach, FL, US.
- 2008 Suyu #3, Suyu Art Gallery, North Miami Florida, US.
- 2007 Eye to Art, Idesigns, Coral Gables, Florida, US.
- 2007 Kick off Basel, Obini Studio Gallery, Miami, Florida, US.
- 2007 Las Voces del Caribe, Galerias Prinardi USA, West Palm Beach, Florida, US.
- 2006 Voices For Children Foundation, First National Bank of South Miami, Miami, Florida, US.
- 2000 Homenaje a Reinaldo Arenas, Blue Angel Gallery, Miami, Florida, US.
- 1996 Jovenes en la Plastica, Galeria Imagos, Havana, Cuba.
- 1995 Fragmentos desde la Ventana, Galeria Arte 7, also featuring Alejandro Garcia, Carlos Guzman y Fernando Ruiz, Havana, Cuba.
- 1995 Galeria Juan David, Havana, Cuba.
- 1995 Exposicion Los Monstruos de la Razon, Salon de Arte Cubano Contemporaneo, Havana, Cuba.

== Artwork and analysis ==
Nicot is a Neoexpressionist. His style is a distinct exponent of the movement that has become known for elements such as rejecting the use of sharp, clear lines and instead using often tenebrous color and texture to define form. He creates works that are somber and psychological in nature, often painting haunting portraits depicting real or imagined subjects as well as mythological and spiritual themes. His works often use a main color as a backdrop to set an ambience for the subject matter and then builds upon it with secondary accent colors to enhance the central figure(s). While mainly known for figurative work, Nicot also occasionally paints nonrepresentational abstract pieces, though color and texture remain his defining hallmark characteristics within them. Nicot works in mixed media (oil, acrylic, charcoal) on paper and canvas, as well as occasional engraved works.

Nicot describes his creative process as highly experimental. In interviews as well as artist statements, Nicot has explained that he never plans his pieces before beginning them and instead allows them to develop in their own spontaneous and intuitive manner. His finished works are meant to evoke inner-reflection in the viewer. To achieve this, Nicot refers to a “transparent spirituality” — a term for his art coined by Manuel Vidal — in his work that he says infuses all of himself into his work, drawing from his “inner world” of dreams, emotion, the unconscious, as well as intellect. He has summarized his painting method as follows: “the creation of a work of art is having traveled various roads through experimentation, until reaching the culmination of an organic art form through figurative-expressionist abstraction, emphasizing the values and riches of the textures and relief of non-conventional art forms.” Nicot further clarified that his art seeks to “deliver a marked message of color, strength, highs and lows.” He has cited his mentor Antonia Eiriz, the Spanish painter Francisco Goya, and prehistoric art as major influences and inspirations for his work. Other influences he would credit include Manuel Vidal, Nelson Dominguez, Rufino Tamayo, Fernando de Szyszlo and aboriginal Australian art.

Nicot's artwork has received analysis from media and art critics. The Miami Herald has described his work as "explor[ing] the mystical underpinnings of the daily", writing that "In Nicot’s hands, chickens, chairs, and babies alike are imbued with a heavy yet inexplicable symbolism." El Nuevo Herald has stated that Nicot uses the densely layered paint texture to evoke a sculptural sensorial quality in two dimensions and that Nicot "recovers the connection that existed between German Expressionism and the primal forces of art and/or its connection with the mythical." Miami Art Guide concluded "[Nicot's] smoky compositions are both timeless and reverent" as well as "austere" and The Ledger described Nicot's subject matters as "inhabitants of a netherworld." In explaining Nicot's portrait series, Anthony Ardavin, who curated Nicot's 2009 solo exhibition Current Works by Adriano Nicot at the Bakehouse Art Complex, said "the characters he paints are extraordinary because despite the total economy in their features they emanate an energy against which it is impossible to remain indifferent," referencing Nicot's objective that the pieces spark a deeper reflection within the viewer. Musaschy Filgueira (known professionally as Niten), co-curator of the collective exhibition Ceaseless Stream that Nicot participated in, told The Lakelander that Nicot uses his theatrical dark colors and tones to "create a new language of the traditional Cuban painting." In her analysis of his oeuvre, Cuban art historian and author Hortensia Montero similarly describes Nicot's work as psychological, conceptual, and existential in nature with emotional and dramatic features that converge to create a symbolic language seen throughout his career. She writes “His rejection of conventional ideas leads him to discover enriching alternatives for his own language.” This personal language, Montero explains, stems from “the sensitivity of the human being through [...] a graphic, personal and intimate universe.” She further assessed that “[Nicot’s] iconography refers us to the fantastic attraction of singular characters, whose existential references [...] sharpen the theatricality of the figures, which dominate the composition, shape his peculiar aesthetic discourse, [and] reflect the unmistakable poetry of his style.” In all, Montero concludes that Nicot “tells us stories where the existential atmosphere of the individual and their conditions of coexistence are noticed [and] resolved with the magic that surrounds the dramatic plot of their imaginary.”

== Selected works ==
Paintings:

Books:

- El tiempo que me interroga (The Time that Interrogates Me)
- Monsters of the Reason

== Recognition ==
In interviews Nicot has attributed his early career success to his work being easily distinguishable from other Latin American artists due to their personal introspective nature and distinctly dark and stark tones. This was in contrast to the norms within Cuban and Latin American art to emphasize light and bright color in order to infuse their well-known tropical and Caribbean surroundings. He attributed this early distinction as a signature element of his work for imparting a memorable impact that led to his enduring appeal among critics and collectors. Manuel Vidal, one of his earliest high-profile supporters, has stated that Nicot's subjects “radiate a transparent spirituality [...] because [they have] been humanized, metamorphosed, and transfigured by the fabulous work of the artist." In addition to the early exhibitions with the Vidals, Antonia Eiriz, and other Cuban art notables, Nicot also gained recognition in Cuba for his 1994 public art commission in Havana to paint a mural in the Casa de Cultura Centro Habana.

Since becoming re-established in the United States, Nicot has published the books El tiempo que me interroga, which explores Nicot's art and poetry, and Monsters of the Reason, which focuses on his visual art. His art is also featured in several books including País sin Moscas by Felix Anesio, La Patria es una Naranja by Félix Luis Viera, Miami mi rincón querido by Eduardo René Casanova Ealo, as well as on the magazine Revolución y Cultura’s article by Jesús Vega covering famed Cuban art critic Zoe Valdes’s book Ficciones con Sangre Azul.

Throughout his career Nicot has won art awards in Cuba, the United States, Latin America, Germany, and Israel. Among his first career recognitions was a Reconocimiento Award by FIART, the Feria Internacional de Artesania, on 15 June 1991 by Rafael Gutierrez, Director of the Fondo Cubano de Bienes Culturales. Nicot won the First Prize for his painting La Bella de la Alhambra, a key work of Nicot's early career, in the juried Third Salon of Havana's la Galeria Arte Siete on April 24, 1994, which was presided by Fidel Perez Cardenas, Director of the Centro Cultural Cinematográfico Yara. Nicot was awarded the Judge's Distinction Award by the Broward Art Guild in July 2009 for his Mixed-media painting Carmen during their Human Image and Portrait exhibition. City of Hialeah Mayor Carlos Hernandez awarded Nicot a Personal Recognition Award on July 21, 2016, for his contributions to the exhibition The Afterlife of Color.

Along with his ongoing Portraits and mythological-themed series, a piece that has emerged as a significant work of Nicot's post-Cuba period is Dónde el alma se te quiebra, a painting which has often served as the centerpiece for VIP attendee photos in several major events and exhibitions Nicot has participated in. One notable example was 2018's Ceaseless Stream in Lakeland, Florida, where community notables in attendance, including Lakeland Mayor Bill Mutz, posed alongside the piece with artist and curator Niten to promote the event. The piece was also mentioned in The Ledger's subsequent coverage of the exhibition. Another was 2020's Imagine: A Collective Art Exhibition at Florida International University where the piece was also used as the backdrop for promotional material. Since arriving to the United States, Nicot has been interviewed and covered in various media outlets on television and print media such as the Miami Herald, El Nuevo Herald, Express News Latinoameria, Diario Las Americas, The Ledger, The Lakelander, Miami Art Guide, ART Oncuba, Platforma de Arte Contemporaneo, Akerú Noticias, and The Artisan Magazine. His work is featured in private collections in the United States, Canada, Cuba, Mexico, the Dominican Republic, South America, Europe and Asia. Nicot's artwork is mostly associated with Latin American art and is included in notable collections such as those of curator Gustavo Orta, Cuban-Dominican art critic and film director Raysa White, theater director and former Miss Cuba Flora Lauten, and Secretary of the Cuban National Commission for UNESCO Mariana Ramirez Corria.

In September 2024, Nicot’s piece Blasa y Melanio was accepted into the permanent collection of the Alvin Sherman Library, one of the largest libraries in the state of Florida, as part of the Marta Permuy Legacy Collection. The library’s permanent collection also features work by Salvador Dalí, Dale Chihuly, Peter Max, and Neith Nevelson. The piece was subsequently unveiled with an exhibition at the library in October 2024 during Hispanic Heritage Month.

== See also ==
- Antonia Eiriz
- Manuel Vidal Fernández
- Cuban art
- Neo-expressionism
