= Juan Andrés Rodríguez =

Juan Andrés Rodríguez may refer to:

- Juan Andrés Rodríguez (equestrian)
- Juan Andrés Rodríguez (artist)
