= Larraz =

Larraz is a surname. Notable people with the surname include:

- José Ramón Larraz (1929–2013), Spanish film director
- Julio Larraz (born 1944), Cuban painter, sculptor, printmaker and caricaturist
- Oliver Larraz (born 2001), American association soccer player
- Pedro Cortés y Larraz (1712–1787), Guatemalan Roman Catholic bishop
- Roberto Larraz (1898–1978), Argentine fencer
- Vicky Larraz (born 1962), Spanish singer and television presenter
