= Luis Marín =

Luis Marín may refer to:

- Luis Marin (conquistador) (1499–1547), Spanish conquistador
- Luis Marín (footballer, born 1906), Spanish football player
- Luis Muñoz Marín (1898–1980), journalist, politician, statesman and first elected governor of Puerto Rico
- Luis Marín (footballer, born 1974), retired Costa Rican footballer and currently manager
- Luis Marín (footballer, born 1983), Chilean football goalkeeper
- Luis Marín (artist) (born 1948), Cuban artist
