= Cepero =

Cepero is a surname. Notable people with the surname include:

- Danny Cepero (born 1985), American soccer player
- Greichaly Cepero (born 1981), Puerto Rican volleyball player
- Jesús Selgas Cepero (born 1951), Cuban artist
- Julio Cepero (born 1953), Cuban soccer player
- Olga Cepero (born 1975), Cuban triple jumper
- Paco Cepero (born 1942), Spanish guitarist
- Ricardo López Cepero, Puerto Rican politician
