= Salvador José Zapata =

Spanish Galician pharmacist, philanthropist (1781–1854)

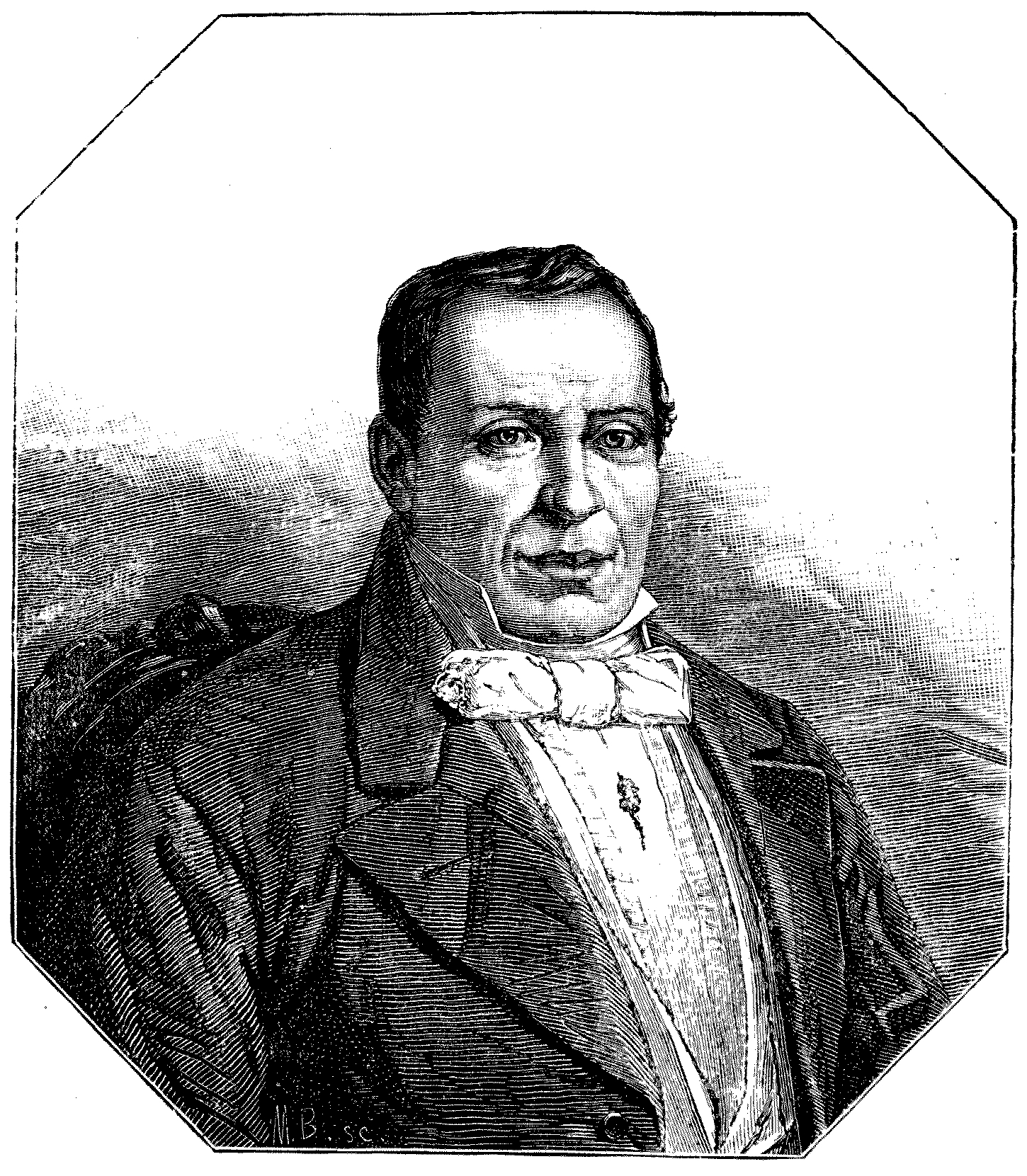
- Born: December 24, 1781; Santa María de Guísamo, Province of A Coruña, Galicia (now Spain)
- Died: April 21, 1854; Havana, Captaincy General of Cuba, Spanish Empire (now Cuba)
- Occupation(s): Pharmacist, philanthropist

Salvador José Zapata (1781–1854) was a Spanish Galician pharmacist and philanthropist. After his death, his estate created a series of schools, the Salvador José Zapata Schools, for underserved children and adults in Havana, Cuba.

== Biography ==
Salvador José Zapata was born on December 24, 1781 in Santa María de Guisamo, Province of A Coruña, Galicia (now Spain).

He emigrated to Cuba at the beginning of the 19th century and started working as an assistant in a pharmacy in Havana. Between 1808 and 1812, he studied in the Faculty of Pharmacy at the University of Havana, and obtained the title of master of pharmacy, with which he was able to open his own establishment.

Over time he earned a small fortune and when he died in 1854, in his will he left all his belongings to build schools in the city of Havana for poor and underserved children. This is how the Salvador José Zapata Schools (or Zapata Schools) began, and the first school was inaugurated in 1873. By 1876 classes were also given to adults. Afro Cuban painter Pastor Argudín Pedroso had attended one of these schools.

The painter Miguel Melero Rodriguez made a portrait of him in 1879. He also has a street in Havana named after him.
