= Pastor Argudín Pedroso =

Afro Cuban painter (1880–1968)

- Born: Pastor Argudín y Pedroso; April 9, 1880; Havana, Captaincy General of Cuba, Spanish Empire (now Cuba)
- Died: 1968 (aged 87–88)
- Other names: Pastor Argudín Y Pedroso, Pastor Argudin Y Pedroso, Pastor Argudin
- Education: Academia Nacional de Bellas Artes San Alejandro, Real Academia de Bellas Artes de San Fernando
- Occupations: Painter, teacher
- Awards: Order of Carlos Manuel de Céspedes

Pastor Argudín Pedroso (1880 – 1968), also known as Pastor Argudín Y Pedroso, was a Cuban portrait and genre painter, and teacher. He was internationally exhibited and was awarded the Order of Carlos Manuel de Céspedes by the Republic of Cuba, for his artistic merit.

== Biography ==
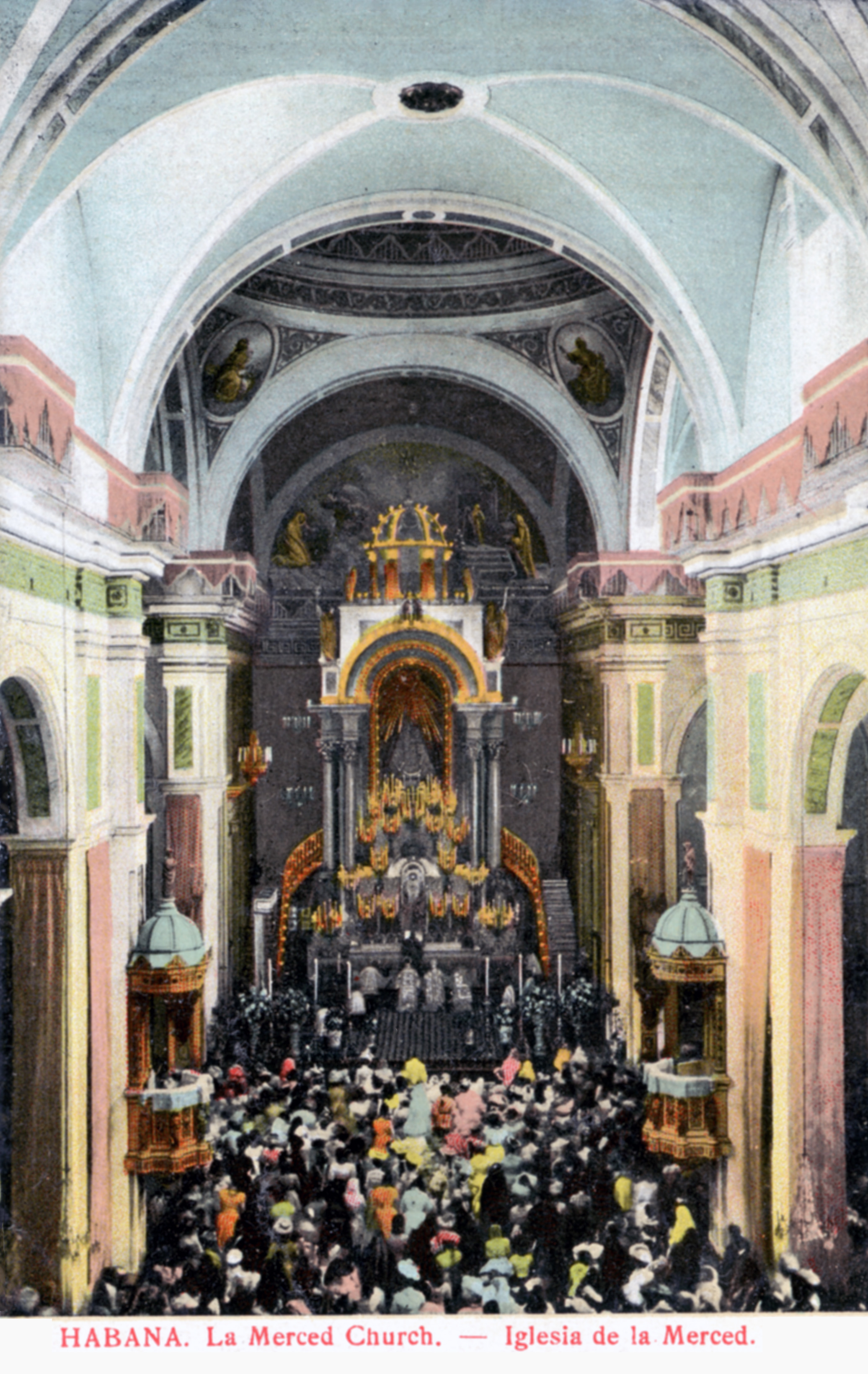
Interior of La Merced Church, Havana

Pastor Argudín Pedroso was born on April 9, 1880 in Havana, Captaincy General of Cuba, Spanish Empire (now Cuba). Some citations state his birth year is 1889. His Afro-Cuban parents had been enslaved in Havana; his father Argudín Lombillo was enslaved by the Casa de Lombillo in Habana Vieja, and his mother Maria de Jesus Pedroso had been enslaved by the Casa de Pedroso. Argudín Pedroso attended one of Salvador José Zapata's elementary schools in Havana. At a young age he studied art under Spanish painter and decorative artist, Francisco Piera. He was promoted for his natural skills, and worked on painting the ceiling of the La Merced Church.

He attended college at the Academia Nacional de Bellas Artes San Alejandro in Havana. He studied at the Academy under Leopoldo Romañach, Armando Menocal, Luis Mendoza Sandrino, and Miguel Melero Rodriguez. This was followed by a 1912 scholarship to study in Madrid, Spain at the Real Academia de Bellas Artes de San Fernando, where he conferred a bachelor's degree. In Spain, he studied under José Moreno Carbonero, Miguel Blay, Cecilio Plá, and Gonzalo Bilbao.

Argudín Pedroso lived and worked in France, Italy, and the United States during the 1920s and 1930s. He continued his studies at Accademia di Belle Arti di Roma in Rome; followed by study at the Académie de la Grande Chaumière in Paris under Émile-René Ménard. Argudín Pedroso was a guest of Arturo Alfonso Schomburg, and lived at his house in Brooklyn, New York for almost one year in the 1930s.

Argudín Pedroso is said to have painted some 300 portraits by 1937, many of which were notable people. Some of his portrait subjects included Rafael María de Labra, Cayetano Quesada (Cuban consul in New York City), Arturo Alfonso Schomburg, John La Farge, Rev. John LaFarge Jr., and Abraham Lincoln, among others. Argudin exhibited at the Société des Artistes Indépendants in Paris, starting around 1924; and he was part of the noted group exhibition, "1933 Exhibition of the Work of Negro Artists", hosted by the Harmon Foundation at the Art Centre in New York City.

== Exhibitions ==
- 1915, National Exhibition of Fine Arts, Madrid, Spain; with painting, "Shepard With Flock of Sheep"
- 1917, National Exhibition of Fine Arts, Madrid, Spain; awarded honorable mention with painting of Antonia la Castiza
- 1919, Galerie des Elyesses, Paris, France
- 1924, Exposition d'Art Américain-Latin, Cuba, Société des Artistes Indépendants
- 1925, "Three Latin-American Canvasses", Musée Galliera (now Palais Galliera), Paris, France
- 1929, Cuba building murals at Ibero-American Exposition of 1929, Seville, Spain
- 1933, "1933 Exhibition of the Work of Negro Artists", Harmon Foundation, Art Center, New York City, New York, United States
- 1935, "Pastor Argudin y Pedroso", solo exhibition, New York Public Library at the 135th St. Branch, Harlem, New York City, New York, United States
- 1935, "Pastor Argudin y Pedroso", solo exhibition, Harmon Foundation headquarters, New York City, New York, United States
- 1938, Harmon Foundation, Kenosha Historical and Art, Kenosha, Wisconsin, United States

== See also ==
- List of Cuban painters
