= Carlos Trillo Name =

Cuban painter

- Born: March 21, 1941; Havana, Cuba
- Died: July 27, 2022; Havana, Cuba
- Education: Self-taught
- Known for: Painting
- Notable work: Manhattan 9/11 y Después, Quince Texturas, Ocres y Azules
- Movement: Espacio 5

Carlos Trillo Name (21 March 1941 in Havana, Cuba – 27 July 2022 Havana, Cuba) was a Cuban painter.

Mr. Trillo is considered a self-taught painter. He lived in New York City from 1954 to 1961. He currently resides in El Cerro, Havana, Cuba. He was a member of the "Espacio 5" (Pedro de Orá, Raimundo García, Carlos Trillo Name, Félix Beltrán, Raul Santos Serpa y Juan T. Vázquez Martín) a Cuban artistic movement.

== Individual exhibitions ==
Some of his individual exhibitions have been: Trillo Expone en el Lyceum (1967), Lyceum and Lawn Tennis Club, Havana, Cuba; Trillo Quince Texturas (1970), Galeria MINSAP, Havana, Cuba; Carlos Trillo Expone (1972), Galeria UNEAC, Havana, Cuba; Ocres y Azules, Carlos Trillo (1974), Biblioteca Nacional José Martí, Havana, Cuba; Trillo Pinturas (1980), Casa de la Cultura de Plaza, Havana, Cuba; Manhattan 97 (1998), Hotel Tryp Habana Libre, Havana, Cuba; and Manhattan 9/11 y Despues (2007), Galeria La Aracia, Havana, Cuba.

== Collective exhibitions ==
His painting has been part of many collective exhibitions, among them: Exposicion de Pintura (1966) at the Galeria del Instituto Nacional de Turismo, Havana, Cuba; Pintores Cubanos (1982) at the Galeria IAO in the Universidad Veracruzana, Veracruz, Mexico; Por la Libertad y La Aministia Total (1984) at the Centro Culteral de Conde de Duque in Madrid, Spain, Maison des Sciences de L'Homme, Paris, France, Instituto de Bellas Artes, Mexico City, Mexico; Contemporary Cuban Art (1994) at the Westbeth Gallery, New York City; Cuban Art: The last 60 Years (1994) at Pan-American Gallery, Dallas, Texas; and Cuba Art and Soul (2007) Galeria El Museo, Santa Fe, New Mexico.
