= Lesbia Vent Dumois =

Cuban artist (b. 1932)

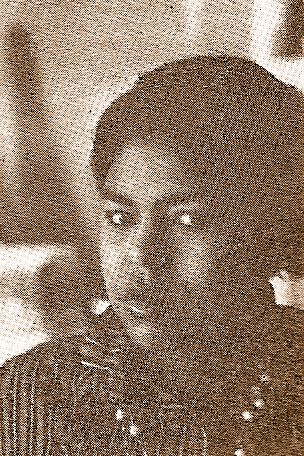
- Lesbia Vent Dumois about 1960
- Born: Lesbia Claudina Vent–Dumois; November 6, 1932 (age 93); Cruces, Las Villas, Cuba

Lesbia Claudina Vent Dumois (born 1932) is a contemporary Cuban visual artist, whose works include illustration, painting, art curation, and engraving. She does not specialize in any themes but is "interested in the everyday and historical references."

Lesbia Claudina Vent Dumois was born on November 6, 1932, in Cruces, Las Villas, Cuba. Vent Dumois studied at the Escuela de Artes Plásticas in Santa Clara, Cuba under Leopoldo Romañach. In 1961 she obtained a UNESCO fellowship to study lithography in Prague. In 1968 she was a member of the Taller Experimental de Gráfica (TEG), in Havana.

From 1980 to 1993, she was Director of Fine Arts at the Casa de las Américas in Havana, and since 1993 is Vice President of the Casa de las Américas.

== Exhibitions ==
=== Solo exhibitions ===
- 1954 Grabados, in the Galería Habana, Arte y Cinema La Rampa, Havana, Cuba.
- 1961 Engravings, in the Union of Fine Artists, Prague.

=== Group exhibitions ===
- 1952, Exposición de la Estampa Cubana, in the Museo de Bellas Artes de Toluca, Mexico City, Mexico.
- 1959, 16th National Exhibition of Prints, Washington, D.C., U.S.
- 1977, Cuba Peintres d'Aujourd'hui, in the Musée d'Art Moderne de la Ville de Paris, Paris, France.
- 1984, I Bienal de La Habana. Museo Nacional de Bellas Artes, Havana, Cuba.
- 1995, 1er Salón de Arte Cubano Contemporáneo. Museo Nacional de Bellas Artes, Havana, Cuba.

== Awards and honors ==
- 1960, the Prize at the Primer Certamen Latinoamericano de Xilografía, Argentina.
- 1972, Prize in the International Print Biennial Cracow'1972, Kraków, Poland.
- 1996, Alejo Carpentier Medal, Council of State, Republic of Cuba.

== Collections ==
- Casa de las Américas, Havana, Cuba
- Collection of Engravings, in Berlin, Germany.
- Museo de la Solidaridad, Santiago de Chile, Chile
