= Jesus Castellanos =

Cuban writer (1878–1912)

Jesús Castellanos y Villageliú (August 8, 1878 – May 29, 1912) was a Cuban writer, journalist, critic, caricaturist and lawyer born in Havana, Cuba.

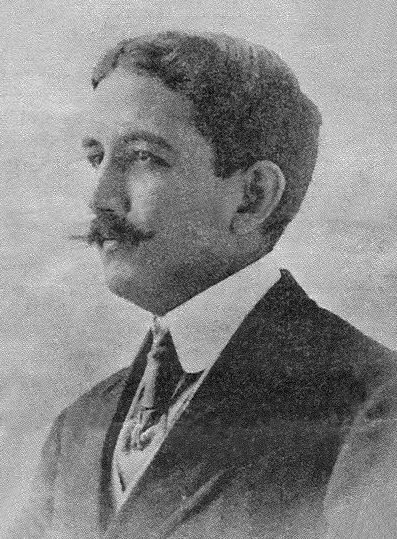
Jesús Castellanos circa 1910

== Biography ==
=== Family and early years ===
Castellanos was the son of Dr. Manuel Sabás Castellanos y Arango and Mercedes Villageliú e Irola, both Cuban born. His father had attended the University of Paris where he obtained a Medical degree in 1868. A year later he certified said degree in Spain and on his return to Cuba he obtained a PhD in Sciences in 1881, and a second PhD in pharmacy in 1889, both from the University of Havana. He was honourable member of the Academia de Ciencias Médicas, Físicas y Naturales de La Habana. He was a physician, researcher and also taught physics at the University of Havana. He was a 33rd Degree Freemason and a linguist with a good grasp of French, Italian, English, and German. The ancestors of Jesús Castellanos maintained that his maternal grandmother, Concepción Irola y Ponce de León, was a descendant of the Spanish conquistador, Juan Ponce de León.

Jesús Castellanos was born on Galiano Street in Havana at the home of his maternal grandparents. He was the third of eight children. From early childhood Jesús was interested in drawing and sketching as well as literature. Not only did he show an early fondness for the classic Spanish authors, but also for modern writers, particularly Victor Hugo and Jules Verne.

In 1893, Jesús entered the University of Havana, first matriculating in the School of Philosophy and Letters, but soon thereafter changing to the School of Law. The following year he again changed course, this time entering the School of Engineering. It was in a student paper named El Habanero that Castellanos, when he was only sixteen years old, published his first literary efforts, almost all of which were in verse. Not, however, in the field of poetry was he to become one of Cuba's literary leaders, but rather in prose fiction, notably the short story and the novel.

In 1896, his parents, fearing his involvement in the bloody and ever increasing conflict in Cuba's war of independence from Spain, decided to send him to Mexico to live with an uncle, Pedro Calvo. Castellanos became a fervent supporter of the societies in Mexico that were working for the independence of Cuba.

During the first American intervention, Castellanos returned to Cuba and re-entered the University of Havana, but instead of resuming his legal training, he took up the study of architecture, influenced no doubt by his great interest in drawing—he had been a disciple of the Cuban painter Leopoldo Romañach, had attended art classes in the Academia de San Alejandro in La Habana as well as in the Academia de San Carlos during his stay in Mexico City. When he was on the eve of graduating in architecture, lacking only two courses, he was convinced that this was not his profession and he again changed course, this time returning to law. He graduated from the University of Havana receiving the degree of “Doctor en Derecho Civil" (doctorate of civil law) in December 1904.

Castellanos was baptised in the Catholic Church and his mother later urged him to affiliate himself with the Catholic Church, but to no avail. Though his father was a prominent Freemason, Castellanos never became associated with the fraternity. He married Virginia Justiniani on August 26, 1908.

=== Death ===
In 1911, Castellanos went to Lake Placid, New York hoping to improve his health which since his youth had been poor. His illness was a chronic stomach ailment. In his efforts to convalesce he also spent time in the Isle of Youth (formerly called the Isle of Pines), Santa María del Rosario in the province of Havana, and Amaro in the province of Santa Clara, Cuba. While at Lake Placid he began his novel, Los Argonautas, which was never completed.

Jesús Castellanos died on May 29, 1912, at the age of 33 of typhoid fever. He left behind his wife and two children, Julio and Alicia, who at the time of his death were the ages of two years old and ten days old, respectively.

== Career ==
=== Journalist and author ===
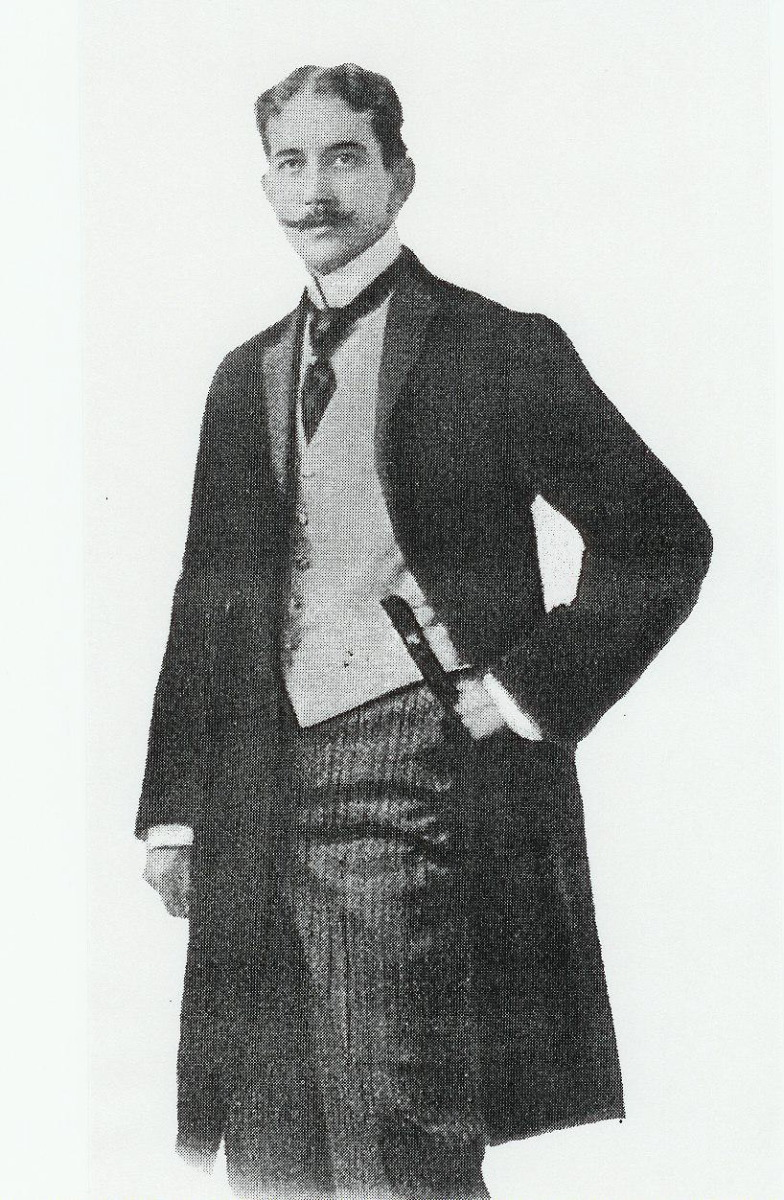
Jesús Castellanos circa 1910

In 1901, Castellanos began writing and illustrating for the daily paper, La Discusión, as city reporter, critic, and caricaturist. His contributions to this periodical were signed with his pen-name "Scarpia." In a short time he was promoted to the editorial staff. He also wrote for the daily Patria under the title of Cabezas de Estudio. These articles depicted in a humorous manner the most prominent politicians of the period and they were accompanied by his caricature sketches of these politicians. These contributions appeared daily for a little more than a year, and from them the author selected the fifty-two that had been given the greatest acclaim and published them in book form under the title Cabezas de Estudio.

In La Discusión, Castellanos initiated a weekly section under the expressive title of "Una Semana Menos," and it was this section that definitively established his literary standing. His intellectual and philosophical accomplishments had given him a cultural equilibrium that he well utilised in his weekly articles, which dealt with varied subjects on a local, national, and international basis. These articles added greatly to the popularity of the paper. Castellanos held that the Cuban press was a most effective means of stimulating the intellectual growth of his compatriots, of creating civic pride in a community, and of promoting the general welfare of the island republic.

=== Lawyer ===
Castellanos practised his law profession in the short intervals between his journalistic work and his literary pursuits, and in 1906, he was appointed "Abogado de Oficios de la Audiencia de La Habana" (Appellate Court) in which work his diligence and fidelity soon won for him the promotion to "Abogado Fiscal de la Audiencia de La Habana" (district attorney) in 1908.

== Works, style, and innovations ==
=== Works ===
His only works published in book form prior to his death were: Cabezas de Estudio (1902), a collection of caricatures of men prominent in public life of Cuba during his time; De Tierra Adentro (1906), a volume of short stories; La Conjura (1908), a novel; and La Manigua Sentimental (1910), a short novel.

The National Academy of Arts and Sciences of Cuba collected and published posthumously three volumes of Castellanos' writings: Los Optimistas (1914), De la Vida Internacional (1916), and Los Argonautas (1916). His still unpublished works are probably equal in volume to those that have been published.

==== Novels ====
- La conjura (1908)
- La manigua sentimental (1910)
- Los argonautas (1916 - not finished)

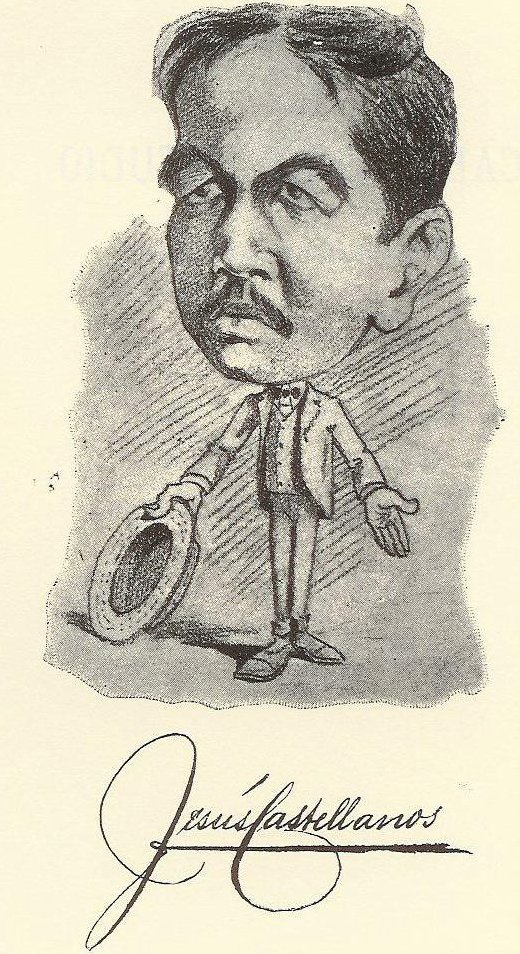
Self-portrait caricature and signature of Jesús Castellanos from the book Cabezas de Estudio, written and illustrated by him and published in 1902

==== Essays, articles and chronicles ====
- Crónicas y apuntes
- Los reyes de Oriente
- Bajo el árbol del bambú
- Humos de San Silvestre
- Dormir, dormir
- Bajo el mareo
- Posta restante
- Serpentinas
- Balada de la hoja seca
- ¡Aquellos años!...
- La primavera
- Aguafuerte
- Arte francés
- Visiones de junio
- Quebec, la romántica
- Estampas neoseculares (Los héroes de Reims)
- Estampas neoseculares (La danza de los "apaches")
- La tristeza humilde
- Renacimiento
- Adiós a 1911

==== Los optimistas ====
- La alborada del optimismo
- Rodó y su Proteo
- Rudyard Kipling
- Mark Twain

==== Lectures and opinions ====
- Heredia y el parnasianismo
- Las cuerdas de la lira antigua
- Altamira
- La sombra de Plácido
- Piñeyro en su casa
- Las bajas del arte; el doctor Huysmans
- El oro de los poetas
- Barbey d'Aurevilly
- Un novelista de los jóvenes: Julio Verne
- Flaubert
- La profecía de Enrique Lluria

==== Stories included in "La conjura" ====
- Una heroína
- Cabeza de familia
- Naranjos en flor
- Idlio triste
- Corazones son triunfo

==== Cuentos sueltos ====
- Un paréntesis
- Un epicúreo
- El llanto de las hadas
- La risa
- La aventura de "Petenera"
- Crepúsculo
- Los dolientes
- La agonía de "La Garza"
- La bandera
- El puente
- Pasado y presente
- Vicio de especie
- Primera falta

==== Stories ====
- De tierra adentro
- En las montañas
- Poema escondido
- Los aguinaldos
- El padre
- Ley de la tierra
- Dos vidas
- Carta de una flor de espino
- Paludismo
- Pata de palo
- Campanas de boda
- El látigo rojo
- El estorbo
- En la laguna

=== Style ===
Very prominent not only in his journalistic articles but also in his prose fiction is his intention to convey instruction and information to his readers through moral observations. This element of his writing was prompted by his fervent love for his compatriots, and this intense interest in the welfare of his country caused him to devote himself to the realisation of a more cultured Cuba, a more enlightened people, and a better social order.

His works reflect a scepticism and nonconformity. Jesús Castellanos in his own convictions was scrupulously honest and fearlessly outspoken. His independence of thought and expression often carried him away from the multitudes of South American critics; if his convictions caused him to walk alone, he willingly did so, defending that which was just and fair.

Castellanos made use of the richness of literary motifs in the lives of humble people in "La Agonía de la Garza", initiating with these themes a trend that would pervade the Cuban short narrative in later years.

In his book De la Vida Internacional, Castellanos attempts to interest his people in world problems—for well does he realize that a knowledge of international affairs will make his fellow countrymen less provincial and at the same time create a more appreciative attitude toward their own country.

=== Innovations ===
Castellanos was a pioneer of the Cuban short story of the twentieth century. He set the path for the national Cuban novel describing the fixed, morally binding customs of Cuban society. His characters are afflicted by social conventions and they have to struggle with what he calls "established stupidity" and "the conspiracy of the fools"—the intellectual's struggles in a society pervaded by mediocrity and debasement. Castellanos is one of the first Cuban writers to condemn hypocrisy and falsehood in politics and human relations.

=== Academic societies ===
In 1910, the Academia Nacional de Artes y Letras was established. Jesús Castellanos was one of the founding members and was elected its first director, and soon he organised a series of monthly lectures to be given by the various members of the academy. The nature of these lectures was to be literary, designed to develop the cultural life of the community. Castellanos was well aware of the need of such an institution in Cuba, and he interpreted its mission as being not a place of honor in society to satisfy the vainglory of selfish individuals, but rather as a centre of cultural growth, a place for the diffusion of knowledge and the betterment of the national life of Cuba. In the same year, Jesús was one of the founders of Sociedad de Conferencias and of Sociedad de Fomento del Teatro, whose purposes were also the intellectual development of Cuba.

== The Platt Amendment ==
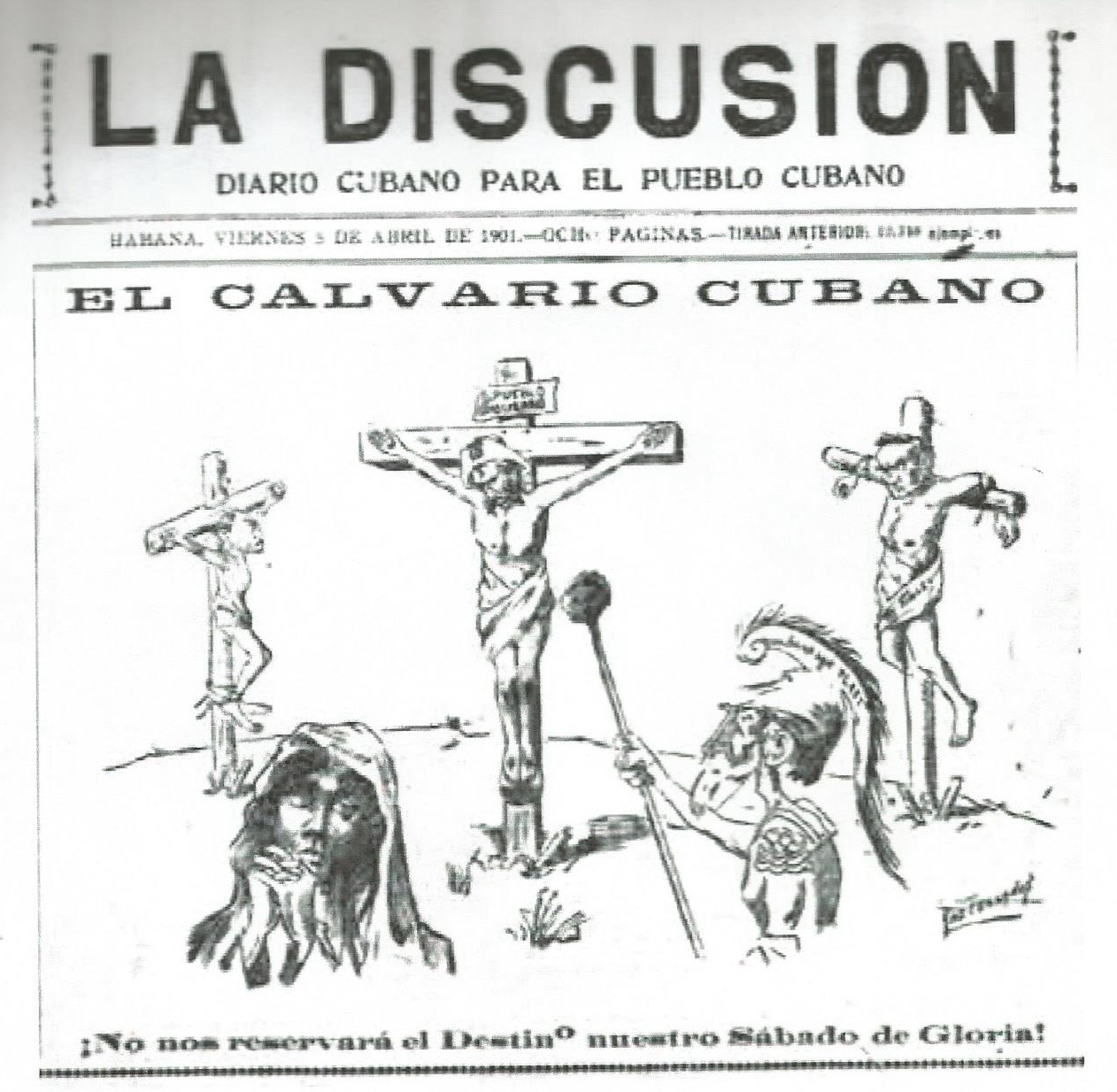
Cartoon run in La Discusión on April 5, 1901, drawn by Jesús Castellanos

Castellanos grew up in an atmosphere of political unrest, of suffering, and of revolutionary uprisings that defined the years leading up to the Spanish–American War. Castellanos grasped every opportunity of aiding his country in its struggle for independence.

On March 1, 1901, the U.S. House of Representatives passed the Army Appropriation bill with the Platt Amendment as a rider. U.S. Senator Orville Platt of the Foreign Relations Committee wrote the amendment that stipulated that Cuba had only a limited right to conduct its own foreign policy and debt policy. It also gave the United States an open door to intervene in Cuban affairs. The Isle of Pines (now called Isla de la Juventud) was deemed outside the boundaries of Cuba until the title to it was adjusted in a future treaty. Cuba also agreed to sell or lease to the United States "lands necessary for coaling or naval stations at certain specified points to be agreed upon." Havana was seething as a result of the Platt Amendment and gave formal protest to General Leonard Wood, the U.S. Military Governor of Cuba at the time.

Juan Gualberto Gómez, Cuban senator, denounced the amendment stating, "To reserve to the U.S. the faculty of deciding for themselves when independence is menaced and when therefore they ought to intervene, to preserve it, is equivalent to delivering up the key of our house so that they can enter it at all hours when the desire takes them, day or night."

A cartoon drawn by Jesús Castellanos on April 5, 1901, in the Cuban paper La Discusión showed "The Cuban People" represented by a crucified Jesus Christ between two thieves, General Wood and American President William McKinley. Cuban public opinion was depicted by Mary Magdalene on her knees crying at the foot of the cross and Senator Platt, depicted as a Roman soldier, is holding a spear that says "The Platt Amendment" on it. Governor Wood, who saw in Castellanos's drawing an unfriendly gesture toward the United States, gave order to apprehend Dr. Manuel M. Coronado, director of La Discusión and Jesús Castellanos, caricaturist of the newspaper. Both were arrested for criminal libel and held in the Vivac prison of Havana, and the offices of La Discusión newspaper were sealed (Wood was persuaded to release them on the following day).
