= Hilda Vidal Valdés =

Cuban artist (born 1941)

Hilda Aurora Vidal Valdés
- Born: August 13, 1941 (age 84); Havana, Cuba
- Other names: Hilda Vidal
- Spouse: Manuel Vidal Fernández

Hilda Aurora Vidal Valdés (born August 13, 1941, in Havana, Cuba) is a Cuban artist, specializing in painting, drawing, design, sculpture, collage, artistic tapestry, and papier mache.

Vidal from 1959 to 1961, studied fashion design and interior design at the Lily del Barrio's American Academy in Havana, Cuba, and in 1961, studied scenography and theater wardrobe at the Sala Arlequín in Havana, Cuba. She was married to fellow Cuban painter Manuel Vidal.

In 2021, the National Museum of Fine Arts of Cuba acquires two oil on canvas works by Hilda Vidal.

== Individual exhibitions ==
- 1975 – "Pinturas de Hilda Vidal"; Galería La Rampa, Hotel Habana Libre, Havana, Cuba.
- 1978 – "Paseo por el Sol. Oleos de Hilda Vidal"; Centro de Arte Internacional, Havana, Cuba.
- 1997 – "La Pintura de la Artista Cubana – Hilda Vidal", BoyCott Art Gallery, Brussels, Belgium.
- 1997 – "El Tiempo que me Interroga. Pinturas y Dibujos de Hilda Vidal"; Galeria La Acacia, Havana, Cuba.

== Collective exhibitions ==
She was part of many collective exhibitions:

- 1974 – IV Salón Nacional Juvenil de Artes Plásticas, Museo Nacional de Bellas Artes de La Habana, Havana, Cuba.
- 1988 – "Creadoras Cubanas. Pintura y Escultura", Museo Nacional de Bellas Artes de La Habana, Havana, Cuba.
- 1992 – Bienal Iberoamericana de Arte, Museo Metropolitano de México, Mexico City, Mexico.
- 1998 – "Tributo a la Danza", in the Galería Habana, Havana, Cuba.

== Awards ==
- 1976 – First Prize; Exposición Concurso Muñecas de Trapo, Museo de Artes Decorativas, Havana, Cuba.
- 1983 – Honorable Mention in Painting; Salón de la Ciudad, Centro Provincial de Artes Plásticas y Diseño, Havana, Cuba.
