= Luis Marín (artist) =

Cuban artist (born 1948)

- Born: Luís Domingo Marín Rodriguez; December 20, 1948; Havana, Cuba
- Education: Academy of San Alejandro, University of Havana
- Occupation: Artist
- Movement: Neo-Expressionism, Cuban art

Luis Marín (born 1948) is a Cuban Neo-expressionist painter and visual artist. He has been active internationally in the arts since the 1980s and is featured in the permanent collections of several prominent fine art institutions including the Museum of Latin American Art and Museum of Art Fort Lauderdale.

== Life and career ==
Luís Domingo Marín Rodriguez was born in Havana, Cuba on December 20, 1948. He spent his early life in the Cuban capital during a period of great social and political unrest resulting from the Cuban Revolution. Marín showed an early interest and inclination toward visual and performance art. After initially training to be an actor, he was later accepted into and graduated from the prestigious Academia San Alejandro, Cuba's leading art academy, and also studied History of Art in the University of Havana. He began exhibiting his art in 1983 when he participated in a group exhibition titled "Salon Plaza ‘83," at the Galería Casa de la Cultura Plaza in Havana. In 1986 he held his first solo exhibition, titled "Expressions," at Havana's Domingo Revenet Gallery. The following year in 1987 Marín left Cuba for Madrid, Spain where he lived and worked for two years.

He then relocated to the United States in 1989, where he joined the extensive Cuban exile community in Miami and became a regarded artist among the younger generation of Cuban exile artists. Since relocating to the United States, Marín would gain critical recognition and continue to exhibit in high-profile American art markets as well as internationally in both individual and group exhibitions. Notable examples from his first three years in the US include his exhibitions at the Inter-American Gallery of Miami-Dade College (1991) and the Cuban Museum of Art and Culture (1992). He would also participate in several fine art auctions, such as the November 2001 Lights for Hope benefit auction by Alpha International Galleries in support of Camillus House, the September 2009 Liga Contra el Cancer (League Against Cancer) Auction, as well as in Sotheby's New York.

== Exhibitions ==
Since beginning to exhibit his artwork in 1983, Marín has participated in over 50 exhibitions and has exhibited in several prominent international art markets including Madrid, Miami, Coral Gables, Coconut Grove, and New York City. His work has also been exhibited extensively across Latin America, including Cuba, Argentina, Mexico, Ecuador, Peru, Panama, Bolivia, and Brazil.

=== Selected individual exhibitions ===
Marín's individual exhibitions include:

- 1986: "Expressions," Domingo Revenet Gallery, Havana, Cuba
- 1987: Instituto de Cooperación Iberoamericano, Santa Cruz de la Sierra, Bolivia
- 1990: Uniques Gallery, Panama City, Panama
- 1991: Picasso's Gallery, Coral Gables FL
- 1992: Javier Lumbreras Fine Art Gallery, Coral Gables FL
- 1993: Municipal Museum of Modern Art, Cuenca, Ecuador
- 1995: Instituto Cultural Peruano Norteamericano, Lima, Peru
- 1996: "Como el Destello del Cobre: Recent works by Luis Marín," The Americas Collection, Coral Gables FL
- 1997: "Voices, Visions, Views," Ralleigh Gallery, Boca Raton FL
- 1998: Sun Trust International Bank, Miami FL
- 1999: "Obra," Ars Atelier, New Jersey
- 2000: Galería Villa Riso, Rio de Janeiro, Brazil
- 2002: Academia de Ciencias, Santo Domingo, Dominican Republic
- 2004: "Expresion", Galería Mi Tierra, San Juan, Puerto Rico
- 2004: "Las Huellas de mi Ciudad," Havana, Cuba
- 2005: "Recent Work," Hotel Gran Melia, Cancun, Mexico
- 2005: IV Cumbres Jefes de Estado Estado & Gobierno de Países de Caribe (IV Summit of Heads of State & Government of Caribbean Countries), Atlapa Convention Centre, Panama City, Panama
- 2005: University of Miami, Coral Gables FL
- 2006: Recent Work, Commodore Gallery of Art & Design, Coconut Grove, FL
- 2007 Alberto Romeu Studio, Miami
- 2007: University of Miami, Coral Gables FL

=== Selected group exhibitions ===
Marín's collective exhibitions include:

- 1983: Salon Plaza ‘83, Galería Casa de la Cultura Plaza, Havana, Cuba
- 1986: II Bienal de de la Habana, Galería Domingo Revenet, Havana, Cuba
- 1987: American School Cooperative, Santa Cruz de la Sierra, Bolivia
- 1988: Cuban Center, Madrid, Spain
- 1991: "Abstractions," Miami-Dade Community College, Inter-American Gallery of the Wolfson Campus, Miami FL
- 1992: "Acupuntura," Cuban Museum of Art and Culture, Miami FL
- 1993: "Son," Design Center of America, Dania Beach, FL
- 1994: "African Influence on Latin American Art," St. Thomas University, Miami FL
- 1994: "Cuban Presence," Vista Gallery, New York City, NY
- 1994: "Afro-Mythology in Works," Barbara Greene Gallery, Coconut Grove, FL
- 1996: "Paper Visions," VI Biennial, Housatonic Museum of Art, Bridgeport, Connecticut
- 1996: "Identidad," The Gallery of Coral Gables, Coral Gables FL
- 1996: "9 Cuban American Artists," Kingsborough Community College Art Gallery and State University of New York, New York
- 1997: "Breaking Barriers," Museum of Art Fort Lauderdale, Fort Lauderdale FL
- 2002: "The Salon of Cuban Art Celebrating the 100th Anniversary of Cuban Independence," SONO Art Gallery, New York City
- 2002: El Espacio, Salon Pequeño Formato, Santo Domingo, Dominican Republic
- 2003: Exposición Casa del Médico, San Juan, Puerto Rico
- 2004: VII Salón de la Plástica Cubano-Mexicano Subasta de Arte Latinoamericano, Fundación Arte para la Paz, Mexico City, Mexico
- 2005: Festival Cervantino Exposición Artes Plásticas APAP, Panama City, Panama
- 2007: Doral Arts Festival, Rotary Club of Doral, Doral FL
- 2009: Exhibición de Grabado, Coral Gables FL
- 2015: Habana 305 Gallery, Miami FL

== Style ==
Luis Marín is considered a Neo-Expressionist. Cuban art historian Giulio V. Blanc describes Marín's work as having "an appreciation and understanding of light," being "influenced by Caribbean aesthetics," and "Explores the contradictions between abstract and representative art." New York-based Cuban art critic Gustav Valdes stated that Marín "Uses traditional and religious references" and "paints the souls and essence of things in their pure states."

Marín's works explore the visual stimulus of the spectator and represent a constant search of emotions and sensations through aggressive lines, forms, and bold color applications. His Cuban culture is a recurring theme throughout his career. Marín described much his work, particularly during the 1990s, as being influenced by Afro-Cuban culture including: myths, social dynamics, eroticism, and syncretism. As such it was defined by symbols and vivid color usage.

Marín tends to reject political themes and narratives in his art. Explaining this, as well as how his work has evolved since leaving Cuba, Marín told El Nuevo Herald "I have always avoided direct political lectures in my work, I live in a certain context, but I am not interested in permeating my pieces with politics. [...] in Cuba my pieces played more with irony and sarcasm, but today my work is more open, much more complex." He often leaves his works undated, sometimes untitled, and signs his works "Marín."

== Recognition and collections ==
Over the course of his nearly 40-year career, Marín has become regarded internationally as a respected Cuban artist of the late 20th and early 21st century. As such, has exhibited his work alongside other renown Cuban artists including Hugo Consuegra and Baruj Salinas. Marín has also been supported by leading Cuban art critics and scholars. Smithsonian Institution associate, historian and curator Giulio V. Blanc compared him to Willem de Kooning. Additionally, Paris-based Cuban writer, film director, and former editor of Cine Cubano magazine Zoé Valdés described Marín's work as "crystalline poetry, influenced by the greats."

He has also been discussed in several books of Cuban art and Latin American culture, including Memoria: Cuban Art of the 20th Century, Breaking Barriers, Queering Creole Spiritual Traditions, and The Dictionary of Art (1996). His career has also been covered by Latin American art media, such as El Nuevo Herald, Art in America, Art Nexus, Latin American Art Magazine. The catalog for his 2004 Cuban individual exhibition Las Huellas de mi Ciudad, his first in Cuba since leaving in 1987, is included within The Princeton University Digital Archive of Latin American and Caribbean Ephemera.

Luis Marín's work is included in the permanent collection of several museums, embassies, universities, and banks. Museums that hold his works include the Museum of Latin American Art, the Museum of Art Fort Lauderdale, the Municipal Museum of Modern Art in Cuenca, Ecuador el Instituto Cultural Peruano Norteamericano in Lima, Peru, and the Housatonic Museum of Art in Connecticut. His art is also featured in several educational institutions, such as Antioch University, and the Academy of Sciences of the Dominican Republic. Marín's artwork is also held in the Cuban Embassy in Santo Domingo, the Consulate of Cuba in Panama City, Banvivienda Bank in Panama City, and the historic Villa Riso in Rio de Janeiro.
