= Armando Menocal =

Cuban painter (1863–1942)

- Born: Armando José Isabel García-Menocal y García-Menocal; 8 July 1863; Havana, Captaincy General of Cuba, Spanish Empire
- Died: 28 September 1942 (aged 79); Havana, Cuba
- Education: Academia Nacional de Bellas Artes San Alejandro
- Occupations: Painter, educator
- Known for: Painting

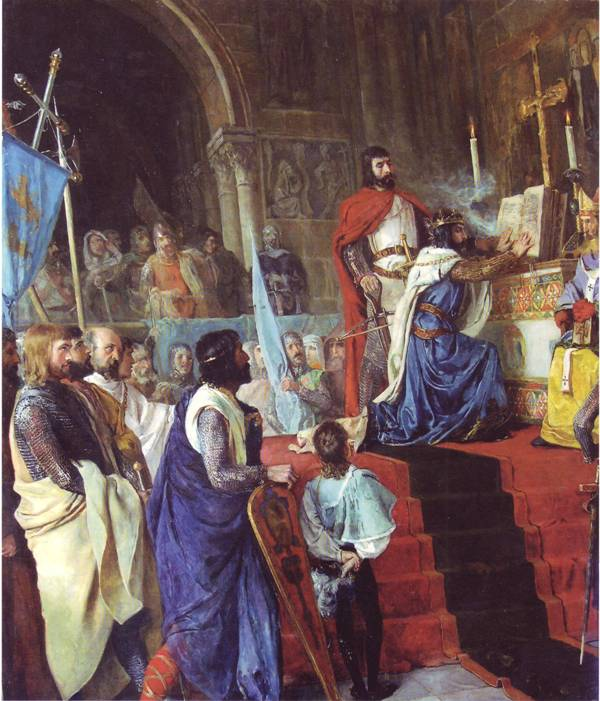
La Jura de Santa Gadea by Armando Menocal, 1889

Armando José Isabel García-Menocal y García-Menocal (1863 – 1942), commonly known as Armando Menocal, was a Cuban painter and educator.

== Biography and career ==
Menocal was born on July 8, 1863, in Havana, Captaincy General of Cuba, Spanish Empire (now Cuba). He first studied at the Academia Nacional de Bellas Artes San Alejandro in his native city, under Miguel Melero. In 1880 he went to Spain for further study with Francisco Jover y Casanova. In Spain he also became acquainted with the work of Joaquín Sorolla and the thinking of Marcelino Menéndez y Pelayo. He also exhibited in Spain, winning numerous awards.

Menocal later returned to Cuba to join the Liberation Forces in the Cuban War of Independence; upon its completion, he dedicated himself to the teaching of art, returning to his alma mater as a professor of landscape painting. In 1927 he was named director; in 1940 he became director emeritus. One of his notable students was Pastor Argudín Pedroso.

His paintings decorated many public buildings around Havana, and today may be seen in the Museo Nacional de Bellas Artes de La Habana. He was also a member of Cuba's National Academy of Arts and Letters. He died on September 28, 1942, in Havana.
