= Juan Ramón Valdés Gómez =

Cuban artist

- Born: 1968; Manicaragua, Cuba
- Education: Instituto Superior de Arte
- Known for: Painting
- Style: Cubism, Modernist Primitivism
- Movement: Vanguardia

Juan Ramón Valdés Gómez (born 1968 in Manicaragua, Cuba), also called "Yiki", is a modern Cuban artist, known for his paintings. His paintings are representative of 20th-century vanguardia artists who rejected the academic conventions of Cuba's national art academy. His work is influenced by Cubism and Modernist Primitivism themes from Cuba.

He attended the Instituto Superior de Arte in Havana. He has earned numerous awards and his work has been exhibited extensively throughout Cuba as well as in North America and Europe. This includes notable exhibits such as "Borders Crossroads" (Galleria Villa Manuela, Havana City - 2006), "Tribute to the 110th Birthday of Wifredo Lam" (Sagua la grande, Villa Clara, Cuba - 2012), "That's Cuba!" (Galleria di Palazzo Tiepolo Salvadori, Venice, Italy, 2016), and "A Fine Collection of Cuban Art, (Whitehalls Gallery, Ontario)
