= Mearson Daniel Zafra Pérez =

Cuban painter (born 1963)

- Mearson Daniel Zafra Pérez
- Born: July 21, 1963 (age 63); Guantánamo, Cuba
- Known for: Abstract painting; Taíno-inspired iconography
- Style: Abstract art

Mearson Daniel Zafra Pérez (born July 21, 1963 in Guantánamo, Cuba) is a Cuban painter, better known as Zafra

Zafra is known for his unique abstract paintings inspired by indigenous Taino petroglyphs found in the caves of eastern Cuba. Like most Cubans, Zafra is of mixed ancestry - among his ancestors were Spanish Jews, Filipinos, Africans and Tainos. However, it is the Taino culture in particular that haunts and inspires his work. In his artist statement he writes -

"An animal can become plant, a plant in the animal. A man can become plant, animal or vice versa.

In my work, I reflect upon the invention of myth as a result of the accumulation of historical recovery, which reaches my conscience in various ways.

Building on the legacy of our ancestors, rock art has expressed the need for the abstracted, the idealized as a reflection of primitive culture in general. This result, the whole iconography in my work is part of a careful selection to create and recreate symbols and signs, which suggest a speculative metaphorical language, which hyperbolizes the narrow and delicate spiritual thread, sometimes providing magnificence and other times spoiled, differentiated traits."

Zafra lives near Santiago de Cuba with wife and son. He is a member of La Unión de Escritores y Artistas de Cuba (UNEAC). His paintings are in private collections in Germany, France, Portugal, Spain, Italy, Canada and the United States.

== Solo exhibitions ==
- 1985- “A la luz del día ”, Galería José Vázquez Pubillones. Caimanera. Gtmo.
- 1986- “Madre Selva”, Galería Transitoria Guantánamo, “Madre Selva”, Galería los Arabos, Matanzas.
- 1987- “Madre Selva”, Galería Wifredo Lam. Cacocum. Holguín
- 1989- “En la ventana”, Centro Provincial de Artes Plástica y Diseño, Sgto. de Cuba, “En la ventana”, Centro Provincial de Artes Plástica y Diseño, Guantánamo
- 1990- “Desde la Atalaya ”, Galería Oriente, Santiago de Cuba.
- 1992- “Pink-Time con titulo- Partes Vulnerables”. Teatro Heredia. Stgo de Cuba.
- 1994- “Retrospectiva”. Galería Espuela de Plata. Centro de Desarrollo de las Artes Visuales. Ciudad de la Habana.
- 1994- “Aperturas Condicionantes”. Galería UNEAC. Santiago de Cuba
- 1995- ”Motivos Condicionados”. Galería Oriente. Santiago de Cuba
- 1997- ”Sobrenaturaleza”. Galería David. Capitolio de la Habana
- 1999- ”Obra sobre Cartulina”. Alianza Francesa.
- 2000- “No figurativo”, Galería de la Catedral Santiago de Cuba.
- 2002- “Obras recientes”, Galería Ateneo Cultural Antonio Bravo Correoso. Santiago de Cuba.
- 2003- “De la realidad al mito”, Galería El Reino de este Mundo, Biblioteca Nacional José Martí.
- 2003-“Armadura sensible”. Galería Ateneo Cultural Antonio Bravo Correoso. Santiago de Cuba.
- 2004-“Cuerpos estremecidos”, Galería Hermanos Tejada, Hotel Meliá Santiago.
- 2004-“Armadura sensible”. Galería “Espuela de plata”, Centro de Desarrollo de las Artes Visuales, La Habana.
- 2004-“En el templo”, Casa del Caribe (Casa de las religiones), Santiago de Cuba.
- 2005-´´El Alma Frente al Espejo´´. Galería Museo del Ron Havana Club. La Habana.
- 2005-´´Revelaciones´´. Parroquia Santísima Trinidad. Santiago de Cuba.
- 2006- ´´Armaduras de los Cuerpos´´. Centro de arte contemporáneo USINE C. Québec, Canada.
- 2006- ´´ Cohoba´´. Casa del Habano, Toronto, Canada.
- 2006- SALON de MAYO, Paris, France
- 2006-´´DIALOGO´´Stanswert, Bochum, Germany
- 2006-Zafra Expone, ESPIRITUS.Galeria SENDRA-ALIZES, Draguignan, France
- 2007- Galería UNEAC. Santiago de Cuba

== Group exhibitions ==
- 1985- “Exposición colectiva de artistas jóvenes ”, Galería de Arte Universal, Gtmo.
- 1986- “Expo DHS”, Galería Transitoria, Guantánamo.
- 1986- “ V Encuentro de paisajes” Galería de Arte Universal, Guantánamo.
- 1986- “Exposición DHS, II Bienal de La Habana. La Habana.
- 1987- “Interrelación hombre naturaleza ” Galería Wifredo Lam. Cacocum. Holguín.
- 1987- “Expo X Aniversario del Poligráfico Juan Marinello ”, Guantánamo.
- 1988- “Expo los cuatros ”, Galería Transitoria, Guantánamo.
- 1989- Del III al IV Salones Provinciales 30 de Noviembre. Galería de Arte Universal
- 1990- Del II al V Salones de Premiados. Ciudad Habana.
- 1990- “A tres manos”, Galería Servando Cabrera Moreno, La Habana. “La torre iba- Bel” Centro de las Artes Visuales, Guantánamo.
- 1991- “Interiores”, Galería espuela de plata, Centro del desarrollo de las Artes Visuales, La Habana
- 1991- ”Interiores”. IV Bienal de la Habana. Centro de Desarrollo de las Artes Visuales. Ciudad de la Habana.
- 1995- Primer Salón de Arte Contemporáneo. Museo Nacional. Palacio de Bellas Artes. Ciudad Habana.
- 1998- ”Bosquejos para un gran relato”. Galería Galeano. Ciudad Habana
- 2000- Invitado al Salón Provincial 30 de Noviembre, Santiago de Cuba.
- 2002- Salón de la Ciudad. Galería Oriente. Santiago de Cuba.
- 2003- Participación en el proyecto Cultural : “Arte soy entre las artes”, auspiciado por la oficina del Conservador de la ciudad de Santiago de Cuba y el Taller Aguilera en conmemoración del 150 aniversario del natalicio de José Martí con la litografía :“Martí antropológico”.
- 2009- 10ma Bienal de la Habana / 10th Havana Biennial
