= Julio Breff =

Cuban painter

- Born: Julio Breff y Guilarte; December 8, 1958 (age 67); Los Cacaos, Sagua de Tánamo, Cuba
- Education: Self-taught
- Known for: Primitive painting
- Style: Naïve art; primitive art
- Awards: First Prize – II Salón Nacional de Pequeño Formato; First Prize – XI Salón Provincial Holguín

Julio Breff (born Julio Breff y Guilarte December 8, 1958 in Los Cacaos, Sagua de Tánamo, Cuba) is a self-taught Cuban painter. He specializes in primitive paintings.

== Individual exhibitions ==
- 1988 - "Pintura primitiva. Julio Breff Guilarte", Galería de Arte Mayarí, Holguín, Cuba.
- 1989 - "Risas y Más Risas", Galería Espacio Abierto. Revista "Revolución y Cultura", Havana, Cuba.
- 1989 - "De la imaginación y los sueños", 3rd Bienal de La Habana, Havana, Cuba.
- 2001 - "Julio Breff. A golpe de ensueños", Galería La Acacia, Havana, Cuba.

== Collective exhibitions ==
- 1987 - "X Feria Nacional de Arte Popular". Sancti Spíritus, Cuba.
- 1995 - "Feria Internacional de Arte World Trade Center/Centro Internacional de Exposiciones y Convenciones", México City, Mexico
- 1997 - " I Salón de Arte Cubano Contemporáneo", Museo Nacional de Bellas Artes de La Habana, Havana, Cuba.

== Awards ==
- First Prize - " II Salón Nacional de Pequeño Formato, Galería de Arte Universal", Camagüey, Cuba.
- 1991 - Honorable Mention - "12ve Salón Provincial de Artes Plásticas Regino E. Boti", Centro Provincial de Arte, Guantánamo, Cuba.
- 1992 - First Prize - "XI Salón Provincial Holguín", Holguín, Cuba.
- 1997 - Special Prize - "XI Bienal Internacional del Humor", San Antonio de los Baños, Cuba.
