= Luis Enrique Camejo =

Cuban contemporary painter

- Born: Luis Enrique Camejo; January 19, 1971 (age 55); Pinar del Río, Cuba
- Education: Pinar del Río School of Art; National Art School; Instituto Superior de Arte; Instituto Superior de Art (ISA)
- Known for: Painting
- Style: Contemporary art
- Awards: First Place Prize, V Painting Contest Nicomedes García Gómez (2003)

Luis Enrique Camejo (born January 19, 1971, in Pinar del Río) is a Cuban contemporary painter who won several prizes, including the First Place Prize in the V Painting Contest Nicomedes García Gomez in 2003. He lives and works in Havana today.

== Studies ==
Luis completed serious studies in the field of Plastic Arts. From 1982 to 1986, Luis Enrique Camejo attended the lessons of the Pinar del Río School of Art, before entering the National Art School in Havana from 1986 to 1990. Finally, he graduated from the Superior Art Institute of Havana (ISA) in 1996.

Since 1996, Luis teaches Plastic Arts at the Superior Art Institute of Havana.

== Artistic style ==
Luis Enrique Camejo's favourites themes are the relationship between man and his environment – especially urban environment at night – and time.

These themes are materialized by lights and colours effects such as blurring or dripping, in order to evocate the speed of modern times, with just some details clear in the vagueness like a tree or – paradoxically – a car.

Luis Enrique Camejo is a member of the Cuban Artists and Writers Organisation.

== Awards ==
2003

- First Place Prize in the V Painting Contest Nicomedes García Gomez, Segovia, Spain

2002

- Mention at the Fine Arts Salon of Pinar del Río, Pinar del Río, Cuba

1990

- Award from the Book Institute in Pinar del Río, Pinar del Río, Cuba
- Mention from the Fine Arts Salon of Pinar del Río, Pinar del Río, Cuba

== Exhibitions ==
=== Selected solo exhibitions ===
2008

- Vanishing, Luis Camejo y Pablo Soria, Pan American Art Projects, Miami, Florida.

2007

- Ciudad Móvil. Godoy World Art Gallery, Madrid, Spain.

2006

- Sueños. Livingstone Gallery, The Hague, Netherlands; Havana Gallery, Zurich, Switzerland.
- Sueño, IX Bienal de la Habana. Morro-Cabaña. Havana, Cuba.
- Sueño, City Gallery. Camagüey, Cuba.

2005

- Places, Galería Servando, Havana, Cuba.
- Tráfico, Livingstone Gallery, The Hague, Netherlands.

2004

- Transparencia, Galería Pequeño Espacio. C.N.A.P. Havana, Cuba.
- Déjà vu, Gallery 23 y 12, Havana, Cuba.

2003

- Landscapes, Art Center, Pinar del Río, Cuba.
- Landscapes, Art Center Ciego de Avila, Cuba.
- Paintings of Luis E. Camejo, San Francisco de Asis Convent, Havana, Cuba.
- VIII Havana Biennale, Havana, Cuba.

2002

- After the Rain, Gallery 106, Austin, Texas, USA.

2001

- Handmade, Gallery Acacia, Havana, Cuba.

1999

- Juntos pero no revueltos, Gallery Havana, Havana, Cuba.

=== Selected group exhibitions ===
2008

- De Pinar... Epílogo visual, Galería Collage, Havana, Cuba.
- The first collection, AD HOD Gallery. Ontario, Canada.
- L.Cadalso, Luis E.Camejo, R.Mena : Intemporel, Paris, France.
- Mi isla es una ciudad, Triennale Bovisa, Milano, Italy.
- Gran subasta del MAC, Casacor, Panama City, Panama.
- Arteamericas, Miami Beach Convention Center, Miami, USA.
- CIRCA, Feria de Arte, San Juan, Puerto Rico.
- XVII Gran Subasta de Excelencias, Fundación San Felipe, Hotel Marriott, Panama.

2007

- Balelatina. Basel, Switzerland.
- Art Amsterdam, Amsterdam, Netherlands.
- IX Bienal de Cuenca, Cuenca, Ecuador.
- Art Madrid 2007, Madrid, Spain.
- Monstruos Devoradores de Energía, Casa de América. Madrid, Spain.
- Cosmos, Galería Habana, Havana, Cuba.
- Luz insular, Addison House Plaza, Panama City, Panama.
- A través del espejo: Arte Cubano Hoy, Galería Allegro, Panama City, Panama.

2006

- Relatos de viaje. Convento de San Francisco de Asís. Havana, Cuba.
- Manual de Instrucciones. Convento de Santa Clara. Havana, Cuba.
- Art Madrid 2006, Madrid, Spain.
- Subasta Fernando Durán, Madrid, Spain.
- 2006 Art Auction. Corcoran Gallery of Art, Washington, D.C.
- Vedado, Galería 23 y 12, Havana, Cuba.
- KunstRAI 2006, Amsterdam, Netherlands.
- En Tránsito, Galería Villa Manuela, Havana, Cuba.
- Du Paysage aux experiences de L’homme, Planet Discovery Hall, Beirut, Lebanon.
- Ici et maintenant, Galerie Intemporel, Paris, France.

2005

- Art Fair Köln, Colonia, Germany.
- Espacios, Galería Espacios, Madrid, Spain.
- TIAFF 2005, Toronto International Art Fair, Convention Center, Toronto, Canada.
- Zomerbeelden, Livingstone Gallery, The Hague, Netherlands.
- KunstRAI, International Art Fair in Amsterdam, Netherlands.
- Cuba, The Next Generation, Center for Cuban Studios, New York.
- Pintura Húmeda, Biblioteca Nacional José Martí, Havana, Cuba.
- El Arte de la Apropiación, Galería Servando, Havana, Cuba.

2004

- Cuba From The Inside, Looking Out, Elaine L. Jacob Gallery, Detroit.
- TIAF 2004, Metro Toronto Convention Center, Toronto, Canada.
- 50 x 70, Havana Gallerie, Zürich, Switzerland.
- Die Magie des Gewöhnlichen, Havana Gallerie, Zürich, Switzerland.
- Es para no ser visto, Galería Praxis Internacional, Lima, Peru.
- Memoria, presente y utopia, Convento de San Francisco de Asís, Havana, Cuba.
