= Juan T. Vázquez Martín =

- Details of Juan T. Vázquez Martín's paintings
- Born: December 23, 1940; Caibarién, Las Villas, Cuba
- Died: January 31, 2017 (aged 76); Miami, Florida, United States
- Education: Drawing and painting teacher
- Notable work: Painter
- Movement: New Abstraction
- Awards: He received national and international awards. Also, he was nominated for the 'Joan Miró' Prize in Barcelona in 1970 and 1971.

Juan T. Vázquez Martín (December 23, 1940 in Caibarién, Las Villas, Cuba – January 31, 2017 in Miami, Florida) lived and worked in Havana, died in Miami. This artist is listed among the Cuban Painters masters. An exceptional prolific abstract painter with a refine style of paint, creativity and cultivated technique. Painter, founder and director of art schools and galleries, teacher of drawing and painting, he was an artist who travelled the world for solo exhibitions, or as a curator for Cuban painters art shows. His paintings are held in international and private collections in South and Central America and Caribbean islands, North America, Europe, Asia, Africa and Middle East.

== Biography ==
Vázquez Martín used to say his artwork was influenced by Paul Cézanne, Joan Miró, Paul Klee, Jackson Pollock, Antoni Tàpies y Manolo Millares, and the Cuban painters Tapia Ruano and Hugo Consuegra.

He was member of the Writer and Artists Union of Cuba (UNEAC) and the International Association of Art (AIAP).

Vázquez Martín was several times selected by the artists members, as President and Vice-President of the Painting Association at the Writers and Artists of Cuba (UNEAC), in recognition to ‘his courage defending the contemporary painting in Cuba’, an office he held each time from 1989 to 1998

This painter art of painting is studied and continue being listed among the worldwide abstract painters masters. His work is held in a number of prestigious collections of national and international institutions including UNESCO International Association of Art (AIAP) in Paris, the Spanish Office of the European Economic Community in New York and the National Museum of Fine Arts in Havana, Cuba; also artworks of Vázquez Martín are listed in the National Catalogue Foundation of Great Britain because of this artist art presence in that country.

As an educator, the Cuban painter developed an engaging instructional approach, utilizing varied lessons to introduce students to art history, theory, and technique. Vázquez Martín emphasized that artists must possess a thorough understanding of societal development and the historical, contemporary, and future role of art within it.

== Critics ==
=== Dr Josephine Reynell from Hertford College, University of Oxford, says ===
'The name of Juan T. Vázquez Martín is among of the great Cuban masters of painting; he is also considered one of Cuba’s leading abstract painters. Through dedication to artistic freedom he played a seminal role in keeping abstract art alive in Cuba. The so-called Grey Period or El Quinquenio Gris in Cuban culture, between 1970–1976, seriously undermined abstract art and indeed experimentation in all areas of the arts in Cuba. Art was seen as a useful propaganda tool and whilst no artist was forbidden to work in a certain way, only those artists whose work conformed to what was considered acceptable were supported. Many artists left the country. Juan T. Vázquez Martín’s refusal to leave Cuba and his steadfast commitment to his personal artistic vision exacted a heavy economic and personal cost, losing him official patronage and promotion. His courageous maintenance of his artistic vision in the face of real hardship had nevertheless enabled him to develop an [sic?] unique style of painting which has had a profound influence on the new generation of young Cuban artists.

He was Director of a number of Schools of Visual Arts in Cuba and taught various well known Cuban artists including Flora Fong (exhibited in London 2007), Gabriel Gutierrez, Nasario Salazar, Oscar Rodriguez Laseria and Joel Jover.

At the age of 16, he won a prestigious and highly competitive scholarship to the Academia Leopoldo Romañach in Santa Clara, renowned as the most progressive art school in Cuba at that time. His art has been influenced by his close friendship with the renowned Cuban painters Hugo Consuegra and Juan Tapia Ruano, but over the years he developed his own and unique style of painting.'

=== Critique by the Cuban painter and critic Manuel López Oliva ===
"Looking at Juan Vázquez Martín's paintings, what is immediately recognisable, is the Renaissance concept of 'the window', the dissolution of forms discovered by Kandinski, as well as the sense of textural beauty introduced by the contemporary painters of the matière school.

In essence, this involves a private display that allows the artist to make a series of paintings on canvas or cartridge paper, revealing to the viewer an ensemble of optical sensations that reflect the internal world of the artist.

We should not forget - because it was forgotten during the period of aesthetic and generational reductionism of the 1980s - that Vázquez Martín was a direct heir, in the 1960s, of the national abstract movement of the 1950s.

Nor should we lose sight of the fact that Juan Vázquez Martín, even when beleaguered in his career, never deviated from his artistic logic - a logic that kept alive and active non-representational forms of plastic art. He used the criterion of symbiotic expression by joining figurative and abstract elements in his overall scheme of things, coalescing them into ectoplasmatic forms, almost veils, that distinguished him in the Cuban canon of painters of the late 1960s and early 1970s. This distinguishing feature of his artistic personality is revealed in simply 'beautiful paintings' - it should be no crime to say so! - paintings in which perceptions of the environment are blended with intimate poetry.

Trying to define Vázquez Martín's works of art, applying a label to his paintings from one period to another, is almost impossible, save for a tendency towards 'abstract' painting. Remove this clause and replace the preceding semicolon with a full stop.

"His style is a skillful blend of the organic with geometry, of order with dissonance, of precise vision with suggestion. It is a whole language in itself, syncretic, and bearing a strong current of delight springing from the possibilities that he coaxes from the materials, methods and tools he uses to work with, the very keys to his paintings.”

Critique by Manuel López Oliva, Cuban Painter and Art Critic, 1996. Translated by Marigold Best and Rayner Reissenberger.

=== Critique by Cristina Burke-Trees, Gallery Terracina director, England ===
"Juan T. Vázquez Martín is an artists Artist. His paintings are unquestionably of exquisite high standard, very beautiful and complete. As we say here in England, he is an artists Artist. This means in general, that only people that are used to look at art and are reasonably well educated understand the depth of his skill and complexity of his work. "

Gallery Terracina Haven Banks, Canal Basin, Exeter EX2 (The international community of artists was sad when this nice and important gallery closed its doors. Gallery Terracina became a virtual gallery on Internet) http://www.artterracina.co.uk/Welcome.html

== Charges and Formation ==
- 1963-1977 Founder, director and professor in different schools of Fine Arts.
- 1989-1998 Several times Painting section President or Vice-President in the Visual Arts Association of Writers and Artists Union of Cuba (UNEAC).
- In 1957 he was granted a scholarship to study Visual Arts. In 1962, he was invited to participate in the São Paulo, VI Biennial, Brazil. In 1963 he graduated as a teacher of Drawing and Painting, and in 1990 as a specialist in Silk Screen.

== Personal exhibitions (resume) ==
- 2017 Vázquez Martín Gallery, BirdRoad Art District, Miami, Florida, United States.
- 2015 Blue and Gray solo exhibition and Painting Performance, during the celebrations of the 150 United States Civil War anniversary, at Treasure Coast Community Singers Concerts Hall, Stuart, Florida, United States.
- 2012 Cuban Abstract Painting, HCC Ybor City Art Gallery, Tampa, United States.
- 2011 Opening Roads, Domingo Padron Gallery, Miami, United States.
- 2009 Solo Exhibition dedicated to the 50 Anniversary of Cuba Revolution, Time Gallery, Vienna, Austria.
- 2009 Solo Che Guevara Exhibition for the 50 Anniversary of Cuba Revolution, as part of the Bloody Sunday 37 Anniversary Events in Derry, Northern Ireland, UK.
- 2008 Exhibition and lecture, Vienna, Austria.
- 2008 Open Studio, Derry, Northern Ireland, UK.
- 2005 Returning home, Caibarien gallery, Cuba.
- 2005 ‘Abstractions in Havana Centre’, homage exhibition to Vázquez Martín by Culture Havana Centre, Chine Tradition House, Havana City, Cuba.
- 2004 Exhibition in Mazorca, Mexico City, México
- 2004 Three ways of Abstraction, Art Plastic provincial council Gallery, Santa Clara, Cuba.
- 2000 “Show in Blue”, Nelson Museum, Monmouth, Wales, Great Britain.

== Collective exhibitions (resume) ==
- 2014 '100 Abstractos', Casa del ALBA, Havana, Cuba.
- 2010 'La Otra Realidad'(The other reality), anthology of the Abstract Painting in Cuba, Fine Art National Museum, Havana, Cuba.
- 2008 Farewell Gallery Terracina, Exeter, Devon, UK
- 2008 'The book of lost things', Gallery Terracina, Exeter, Devon, UK.
- 2007 Cinco pintores abstractos, Villa Manuela gallery, Havana, Cuba.
- 2006-2007 His paintings have been exhibit at Gallery Terracina, Exeter, England.
- 2006 Un son para Nicolas, Villa Manuela gallery, Havana, Cuba.
- 2004 Exhibition of Cuban and Mexican artists, Cuban embassy, Mexico.
- 2004 Abstraction Masters in Cuba, La Acacia Gallery, Ciudad Habana, Cuba
- 2003 Alive abstraction, VIII Bienal de la Habana, Galeria en el CENCREM, Habana Vieja, Cuba
- 2003 “Cuban Painters”, Cuban Festival, London Hilton on Park Lane.
- 2003 and 2002 “Cuban Contemporary Painting”, La Acacia gallery, Havana City, Cuba.
- 2002 'Cuban Paintings', Hilton Hotel of Park Lane, London.
- 2002 'Cuban Paintings', Southampton University.
- 2002 Collective exhibition in Trail Artists Colony, Tampa, Florida, USA.
- 2001 "Cuban Painting", Cuba 513 Gallery, Madrid, Spain.
- 2001 "Cuban Painting", several galleries, Italy.
- 2000 England Exhibitions at: Taurus Craft, Lydney, Parkfield Gallery, Pontshill, Gloucester Cathedral, Gloucester, Artists Corner, Chepstow, Gloucestershire.
- 1999 “Cuban Painting Today”, Museum Josefina Gallery, Managua, Nicaragua.
- 1999 “Alive Abstraction”, Wifredo Lam Centre, Havana, Cuba.
- 1997 Silence Paintings, VI Biennial of Havana, La Acacia Gallery, Havana, Cuba
- 1995 “Cuban Painters”, Social Development Summit and Head of States Meeting, Copenhague, Denmark.
- 1995 “Cuban Art”, Barcelona and Madrid, and in Sun Door Fair, Madrid, Spain.
- 1994 “A vision of Cuban Painting today”, Santiago de Chile, Chile.
- 1993 “Madrid House Fair”, Barcelona, Spain.
- 1992 Cuban stand of the World’s Fair, in Seville, Spain.
- 1990 “Cuban Painting Today”, Duris de Samos Gallery, Madrid, Spain.
- 1989 Contemporary Cuban Art, Westbeth Gallery, New York, USA.
- 1988 “Cuban Painting Exhibition”, travelling exhibition for different cities of Spain.
- 1987 I Biennial of Painting “Jaume Guash Foundation”, Barcelona, Spain.
- 1986 VI Triennial of India, (New Delhi,).
- 1985 He participated in International Prize for Drawing Joan Miró, Barcelona, Spain.
- 1984, 1986 VII and VIII Biennial, Kosice, Czechoslovakia.
- 1976 Modern Cuban Painting, La Tertulia Museum, Cali, Colombia.
- 1972 “Chile-Cuba”, Culture Institute. Santiago de Chile.
- 1970, 1971 “The IX International Prize for Drawing Joan Miró”, Barcelona, Spain.
- 1970, ‘70 Salon’, Fine Art National Museum, Havana City, Cuba.

== Prizes and Mentions ==
- 1997 First Prize,”WineArt 97” Competition, label for the first grape Cuban wine, Fantinel S.A. and W.S.D Italian Companies, Havana, Cuba.
- 1988 First Prize and Especial Prize, “July 26” Competition, Revolution’s Museum, Havana, Cuba.
- 1987 Especial Prize of Painting, I Biennial “Jaume Guash”, Spain.
- 1986 “13 March” First Prize of Drawing, Havana University, Havana, Cuba.
- 1976 First Prize of Painting, National Salon de Plastics Art, Ministry of Culture, Matanzas Gallery, Matanzas, Cuba.
- 1970 Painting Acquisition Prize, “Salon 70’ of Plastic Art”, Fine Art National Museum, Havana, Cuba.
- 1969 Drawing Prize, National Salon of Plastics Art, U.N.E.A.C., San Rafael International Gallery, Havana, Cuba.
- 1968 Painting Prize, National Salon U.N.E.A.C of Plastic Art., National Museum de Fine Art, Havana, Cuba.
- 1965 First Prize of Painting, Province Salon “ 26 de Julio”, Santa Clara City, Las Villas, Cuba.

== Principal Collections that exhibit or store his works ==
- _National Museum of Fine Arts, Havana, Cuba.
- _ "La Acacia" Gallery, Havana, Cuba.
- _ National Union of Cuban Writers and Artists (UNEAC).
- _ UNESCO Collection, Paris, France.
- _ Spain Office of the European Economic Community, New York, USA.
- _ Latin-American Art Collection of the Essex University, UECLAA, England.
- _Gallery Terracina, Exeter, England
- _Also, his paintings are in different national and international institutions, as in private collections in Cuba and abroad.

== Current events ==
Juan T. Vázquez Martín, Cuban Abstract painter exhibition promotion. (photo: Mercedes Soca Gil, Havana)

- 2011 Opening Roads, Domingo Padron Gallery, Miami, United States

== Publications where he is mentioned ==
- Universidad de La Habana, Issues 207-209, published by the Universities Exchange Department of Havana University, 1964, an original at the University of California
- Ibero-americana Pragensia, Volumes 1-3, published by the University of Carolina, 1967, an original at University of Texas
- Catalogue of Chile-Cuba Encounter, 197?, those paintings disappeared or were destroyed when Pinochet coup to President Salvador Allende, original at the Editorial Jurídica of Chile
- Revolución y cultura, Issues 35-38; Issue 40 published by the Culture National Council of Cuba, 1974, an original at the University of Texas
- América Latina, Issues 1-4, published by Editorial Progreso, 1976, an original at the University of Texas
- Cuba internacional, Issues 265-270, published by Agencia Prensa Latina, 1992, an original at the University of California
- Artecubano, visual art magazine, Issues 1-3, published by editors from the Plastic Art National Council, Culture Ministry, Republica of Cuba, 2001, an original at the University of Michigan

== See also ==
- Cuban art
- Alberto Corrales One of the best Cuban flute players
