= Rafael Zarza Gonzalez =

Cuban artist (born 1944)

Rafael Zarza González
- Born: Rafael Zarza González; October 1944 (age 81–82); Havana, Cuba
- Education: Escuela Nacional de Bellas Artes "San Alejandro" (1959–1963)
- Occupations: Painter; printmaker; graphic designer; illustrator
- Years active: 1960s–present
- Known for: Painting; engraving; graphic design; illustration

Rafael Zarza Gonzalez (born October 1944 in Havana, Cuba) is a Cuban artist specializing in painting, engraving, graphic design and illustration.

Zarza studied drawing and painting from 1959 to 1963 at the Escuela Nacional de Bellas Artes "San Alejandro" in Havana. He was a member of the Taller Experimental de Gráfica (TEG) at the Plaza de la Catedral in Havana from 1965 to 1996. In addition, he was juror in the Salón de Artes Plásticas UNEAC '82 at the Museo Nacional de Bellas Artes de La Habana in Havana.

== Individual exhibitions ==
Among his must relevant exhibitions can be included in 1972 "Grabados y Dibujos" at the Galeria Viva in México as well as Caracas, Venezuela. In 1980, he exhibited "Grabados y Carteles de Rafael Zarza" at the Sala de Exposición, Centro Cultural Arabe, in Damascus, Syria. In 1995, he exhibited his works "Tauropatía. Zarza. Obra Gráfica" at the Galeria Espuela de Plata, Centro de Desarrollo de las Artes Visuales in Havana. In 1998, he presented his works "30 años no son nada" (litografías 1967–1998) at the Galeria del Grabado, Taller Experimental de Gráfica (TEG), in Havana.
