= Roberto Álvarez Ríos =

Cuban artist (1932–2015)

Roberto Jesús Álvarez Ríos
- Born: September 17, 1932; Havana, Cuba
- Died: December 16, 2015 (aged 83); Saint-Benoît, Réunion, France
- Education: Escuela Nacional de Bellas Artes "San Alejandro"; École nationale supérieure des Beaux-Arts
- Known for: Painting and drawing

Roberto Jesús Álvarez Ríos (17 September 1932 – 16 December 2015) was a Cuban artist who specialised in painting and drawing.

Between 1951 and 1955, Alvarez studied at the Escuela Nacional de Bellas Artes "San Alejandro" in Havana. In 1958, he studied drawing and painting in the École nationale supérieure des Beaux-Arts in Paris, France.

Álvarez Ríos died in Saint-Benoît, Réunion on 16 December 2015, at the age of 83.

== Individual exhibitions ==
- 1962 - "Roberto Álvarez Ríos" Galería de Arte, Galiano y Concordia, Havana, Cuba
- 2002 - "Roberto Álvarez Ríos. Exposition de Peintures". Galerie Foch, Rodez, France.
- 2003 - Galerie du Vieux Chateau, Saint-Jean le Thomas, France
- 2004 - Galerie Hang Art, Paris, France
- 2005 - Centre Culturel "Le Triangle", Huningue, France

== Collective exhibitions ==
- 1955 - " XXXVI Salón de Bellas Artes", National Museum of Fine Arts of Havana
- 1959 - "Ière. Biennale de París", Musée d'Art Moderne de la Ville de Paris, France
- 1994 - "Petits Formats", Espace Altura, Paris, France.
