= José Omar Torres López =

Cuban artist (born c. 1953)

- José Omar Torres López
- Born: 1953 (age 72–73); Matanzas, Cuba
- Education: Escuela Nacional de Arte (ENA), Havana (1968–1973); Post-graduate lithography course with Luis Miguel Valdés, José Contino, José Luis Posada (1975–1976); Engraving studies (1987–1989)
- Alma mater: University of Havana (Art History, 1976–1978); Instituto Superior de Arte (ISA), Havana (Engraving, 1987–1989)
- Known for: Painting; engraving; drawing
- Awards: Third Prize, Salón Nacional de Grabado, Galería Oriente, Santiago de Cuba (1973); Second Prize, II Salón Provincial de Profesores e Instructores de Artes Plásticas, Museo Nacional de Bellas Artes, Havana (1974); Third Prize (Lithography), Segundo Salón Nacional de Grabados, Galería Amelia Peláez, Parque Lenin, Havana (1974); Resident Artist, Brandywine Workshop, Philadelphia (1999)

José Omar Torres López (born 1953) is a Cuban artist. His main fields were painting, engraving, and drawing. He was Director of the Taller Experimental de Gráfica (TEG), Havana, Cuba from 1986 to 1993.

== Education ==
López was born in 1953 in Matanzas, Cuba. Between 1968 and 1973 he studied at the Escuela Nacional de Arte (ENA), Havana. Between 1975 and 1976 he studied a Post-graduate course on lithography with professors Luis Miguel Valdés, José Contino and José Luis Posada, in Havana. In 1976 to 1978 he studied Art History in Havana University. From 1987 to 1989 he studied engraving at the Instituto Superior de Arte (ISA) in Havana.

== Individual exhibitions ==
Among his most important solo exhibitions were Temperas de José Omar Torres, in Galería L, Havana, 1973. In 1992 he exhibited Jose Omar Torres' in the Galerie Itinerat, in Paris, France. In 1995 he presented 3 Propuestas (Pintura Cubana) [Eduardo Abela Torrás, José Omar Torres, Carlos del Toro Orihuela] in the Galería de Arte INAC, Plaza de Francia, Panama. In 1997 he exhibited Polos opuestos [José Gómez Fresquet (FREMEZ)/José Omar Torres] in the Ambos Mundos Hotel, Havana.

== Collective exhibitions ==
He was part of collective exhibitions such as the International Print Biennale Cracow 1976, in Kraków, Poland. In 1991 he participated in Grabado Contemporáneo Cubano at the Fourth Havana biennial in the Museo de Arte Colonial, Havana. In 1994 he was included in La Jeune Peinture Cubaine, at the Maison de la Culture du Lametin, Fort de France, Martinique. In 1995 he participated in the Feria Internacional de Arte, in the World Trade Center/Centro Internacional de Exposiciones y Convenciones, Mexico City, Mexico. In 1999 he was one of the selected artists to be shown in Afro-Cuban Contemporary Graphic Art at The Kennedy Center, Washington, D.C.

== Awards ==
In 1973 he won Third Prize in the Salón Nacional de Grabado, Galería Oriente, Santiago de Cuba. In 1974 he gained Second Prize at the II Salón Provincial de Profesores e Instructores de Artes Plásticas, Museo Nacional de Bellas Artes, in Havana. In 1974 he also won Third Prize in Lithography in the Segundo Salón Nacional de Grabados, Galería Amelia Peláez, Parque Lenin, in Havana. In 1999 he was recognized with the title of the Resident Artist, Brandywine Workshop, Philadelphia, in Pennsylvania.

== Collections ==
His works can be found in the Biblioteca Nacional José Martí, in Havana; in the Lehigh University Art Galleries (LUAG), in Bethlehem, Pennsylvania; in the Museo Nacional de Bellas Artes, Havana; and in the Taller Experimental de Gráfica (TEG), Havana.
