= Gilberto Andrés Romero Pino =

- Born: November 16, 1948; Havana, Cuba
- Education: Self-taught
- Known for: Humorous drawings and paintings; cartoon art
- Style: Humorous art; caricature
- Movement: Cartooning; humorous graphic art
- Awards: Cuban Ministry of Culture Award, Third Humor Internacional Biennial (1983); Award, I Salón Provincial de Artes Plásticas "Eduardo Abela" (1984); Honourable Mention, 7th International Cartoon Contest, Yomiuri Shimbun, Tokyo; Trophy, II Salón "Eduardo Abela", San Antonio de los Baños

Gilberto Andrés Romero Pino (born November 16, 1948, in Havana, Cuba), is a self-taught Cuban artist specializing in humorous drawings and paintings.

== Career ==
He has participated in exhibitions such as the First through Sixth Bienal Internacional de Dibujo Humorístico y Gráfica Militante at the Círculo de Artesanos in San Antonio de los Baños, Havana. He was involved in the 7th and 9th International Cartoon Contest at the Yomiuri Shimbun in Tokyo, Japan.

== Awards ==
In 1983, he was awarded the Cuban Ministry of Culture's Award at the Third Humor Internacional Biennial at the Círculo de Artesanos at San Antonio de los Baños, Havana. In 1984, he won an award at the I Salón Provincial de Artes Plásticas "Eduardo Abela", at the Galería de Arte "Eduardo Abela" in Havana. He obtained an Honourable Mention Award at the 7th International Cartoon Contest at the Yomiuri Shimbun in Tokyo, Japan. Two years later he obtained a trophy at the II Salón "Eduardo Abela" at the Galería de Arte Eduardo Abela, in San Antonio de los Baños, Havana.

== Collections ==
His works can be found at Casa del Humor y la Sátira in Gabrovo, Bulgaria and at the Museo del Humor in San Antonio de los Baños, Havana.
