= Manuel Vidal Fernández =

Cuban artist (1929–2004)

- Born: June 24, 1929
- Died: 2004 (aged 74–75)
- Other name: Manuel Vidal
- Occupation: Artist
- Spouse: Hilda Vidal Valdes

Manuel Vidal Fernández (June 24, 1929 – 2004) was a Cuban artist. He engaged in painting, drawing, engraving and graphic design.

== Background ==
Vidal Fernández was born in Havana, Cuba on June 24, 1929. In 1959 he obtained a scholarship for painting studies in France. From 1960 to 1961 he was at the Real Círculo Artístico de Barcelona, Spain. He was married to fellow prominent Cuban painter Hilda Vidal. Vidal Fernández died in 2004.

== Individual exhibitions ==
In 1962 he presented his works in a show titled Exposición de Manolo Vidal de un Puñado de Dibujos, algún Gouache y alguna Tinta', in the Lyceum, Havana. In 1964 he exhibited Exposición Dibujos de Manuel Vidal in the Biblioteca Nacional "José Martí," Havana. In 1995 he exhibited Diálogos, Dilemas, Deseos y Discursos. Dibujos de Manuel e Hilda Vidal in the Galería de Arte Domingo Ravenet, Havana. In 1996 he presented La Interpretación de los Sueños in the Espacio Abierto Gallery, Revista Revolución y Cultura, Havana.

== Collective exhibitions ==
In 1952 Fernández was an artist selected for the show 28 Dibujos y Gouaches de... Antonia Eiriz, Manuel Vidal, Fayad Jamís, Guido Llinás, Antonio Vidal at the Confederación de Trabajadores de Cuba, Havana. In 1959 he was part of the Salón Annual 1959, Pintura, Escultura y Grabado, in the Museo Nacional de Bellas Artes, Havana. In 1963 some of his works were selected for the Salón Nacional de Grabado 1963 at the Museo Nacional de Bellas Artes, Havana. In 1966 he was one of the selected artists for Homenaje al "26 de Julio" at the Galería Latinoamericana, Casa de las Américas, Havana. In 1991 he was included in Olor a Tinta at the Galería Habana, Havana.

== Sources ==
- Vicente Baez, Virilio Pinera, Calvert Casey, and Anton Arrufat, Editors. Pintores Cubanos. Ediciones Revolucion, Havana, Cuba 1962.
- Jose Veigas-Zamora, Cristina Vives Gutierrez, Adolfo V. Nodal, Valia Garzon, Dannys Montes de Oca. Memoria: Cuban Art of the 20th Century. California/International Arts Foundation, 2001. ISBN 978-0-917571-11-4
- Jose Viegas; Memoria: Artes Visuales Cubanas Del Siglo Xx; (California International Arts 2004); ISBN 978-0-917571-12-1 (in Spanish)
