= José Ángel Rosabal Fajardo =

Cuban artist (born 1935)

- Born: José Ángel Rosabal Fajardo; August 1935 (age 91); Manzanillo, Cuba
- Known for: Painting, drawing, engraving, table design
- Movement: Concrete art
- Awards: Mention, Third Latin American Engraving Contest, Galería Latinoamericana, Casa de las Américas, Havana (1964)

José Ángel Rosabal Fajardo (born August 1935) is a Cuban artist. He works in painting, drawing, engraving and even table design. He was part of the group Diez Pintores Concretos.

== Life ==
José Ángel Rosabal Fajardo was born in Manzanillo, Cuba in August 1935.

== Individual exhibitions ==
He has had many exhibitions of his pieces. The first one was in 1959 named "Exposición Rosabal". Galería del Prado, Havana, Cuba. In 1972 he exhibited his works at the Oller Gallery, New York City, United States.

== Collective exhibition ==
He was part of the group selected to participate in the Segunda Bienal Interamericana de México. Palacio de Bellas Artes, Museo Nacional de Arte Moderno, Mexico City, Mexico, 1960. He was also a participant in the Third Latinamerican Engraving Contest celebrated at the Galería Latinoamericana, Casa de las Américas, Havana, Cuba, in 1964. A year later he was in the Second American Engraving Biennial . Museo de Arte Contemporáneo, Universidad de Chile, Santiago, Chile.

== Awards ==
He got a mention in the Third Latinamerican Engraving Contest, Galería Latinoamericana, Casa de las Américas, Havana, Cuba in 1964, and other prizes and honors in the same institution.

== Collections ==
His works can be found among others in the Casa de las Américas (Havana), the Pérez Art Museum Miami, United States, and in the Taller Experimental de Gráfica (TEG), in Havana, Cuba.
