= Leopoldo Romañach =

Cuban painter (1862–1951)

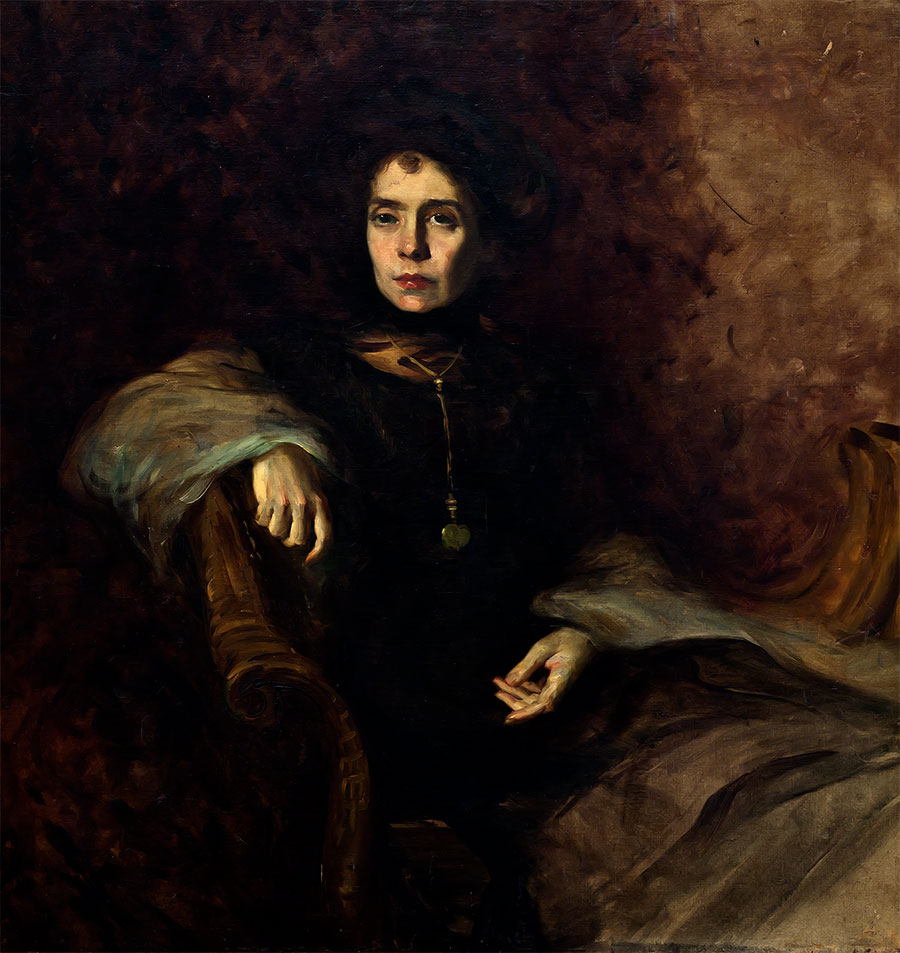
- Born: Leopoldo Romañach Guillén; 7 October 1862; Sierra Morena, Corralillo, Las Villas, Captaincy General of Cuba, Spanish Empire
- Died: 10 September 1951 (aged 88); Havana, Cuba
- Education: Academia Nacional de Bellas Artes San Alejandro
- Occupations: Painter, educator
- Known for: Painting

Leopoldo Romañach y Guillen (1862–1951) was a Cuban painter and educator.

He was born in Sierra Morena, Corralillo, in the province of Las Villas, Captaincy General of Cuba, Spanish Empire (now Cuba).

Romañach was a professor of color theory at Academia Nacional de Bellas Artes San Alejandro, and won a number of awards. The Republic of Cuba granted him in 1950 the Great Cross of the National Order of Merit of Carlos Manuel de Cespedes.

Pastor Argudín Pedroso, Amelia Peláez, Lesbia Vent Dumois, Jesus Castellanos, and Víctor Manuel García Valdés were among his students. The school, "Escuela Provincial de Artes Plásticas Leopoldo Romañach” in Santa Clara, Las Villas, Cuba was named after him.
