= Jeannine Achón =

Cuban abstract painter

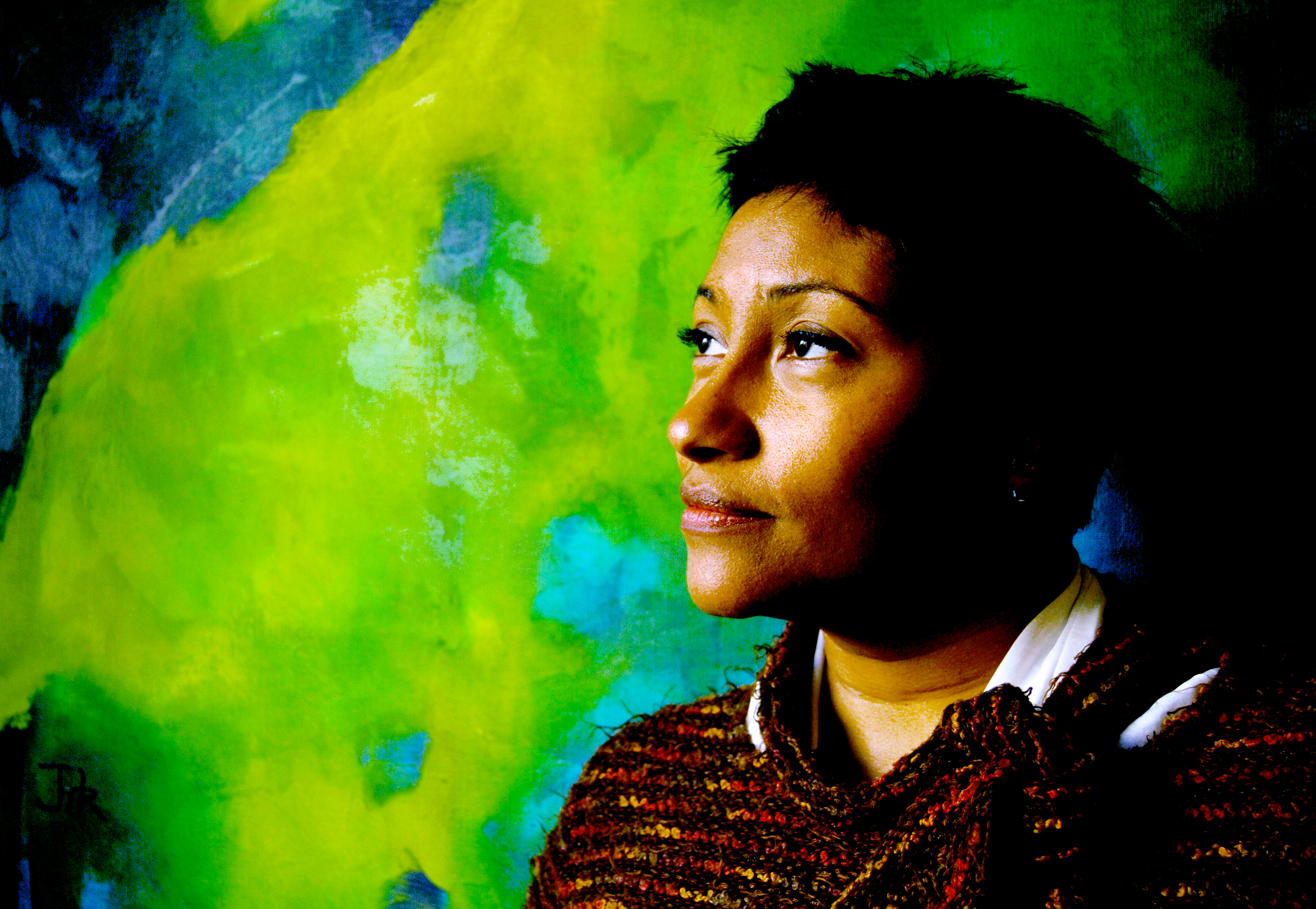
- Jeannine ACHON's Portrait
- Born: 1973 (age 52–53); Havana, Cuba
- Education: Instituto Superior de Diseño Industrial (ISDI)
- Known for: Abstract painting
- Notable work: "Ashé"; "La Puerta Perdida"; "Las Intermitencias del Color"
- Style: Abstract art

Jeannine Achón (born 1973) is a Cuban abstract painter.

Born in Havana, after secondary studies at LaLenin school, she completed a university degree in Industrial Design from the Instituto Superior de Diseño Industrial (ISDI) of Cuba, specializing in Housing (1996). After ISDI, she worked a couple of years at Decoro d'Arq, a design company, for hotel projects, including Hotel Nacional and Capri. Then she focuses on fine arts and paintings, first figurative and illustration, in the late 1990s.

She does scientific illustrations ("Mi Libro de Lagartijas" Alfonso Silva Lee, published by Editorial Gente Nueva), as well as drawings for children's books, always with the same publisher.

Her painting in the late 1990s and early 2000s is still in large part figurative, but already contains the main technical basis and features for her future abstract works: structure composed of multiple layers, the use of acrylic on paper or canvas, rather colorful approaches. This is the time of sales in the art markets of Habana Vieja or Vedado, where foreign tourists and young Cuban artists meet.

Jeannine had her first solo exhibition in 2005 on the Isle of Youth ("Isla de la Juventud"), at the gallery of the Hermanos Saiz Association. It bears the title "La Puerta Perdida", (The Lost Gate") from the title of one of the paintings, and is composed only of abstract paintings, acrylic on canvas, of average size (30 x 40 "). Since then, with few exceptions (orders), Jeannine Achón produces only abstract works, acrylic on canvas, in medium format ( 33") to large (50").

In 2008, she has a second solo exhibition of a dozen paintings in the lobby of Hotel Sevilla Habana, one of the masterpieces of the colonial architecture of Cuba. The exhibition reflects one of the slogans of the official posters of the time: "No Mentir Jamás" ("Do not ever lie"). For the occasion, the paintings were hung through a facility with eight columns of the main hall of Sevilla. The curator of the exhibition was Toni Piñera, critic and columnist of Cuban art, long-time director of the art gallery "La Acacia" in Havana.

Two years later, in late 2009, she organized an exhibition at the National Union of Cuban Writers and Artists (UNEAC), entitled "Las Intermitencias del Color", a title inspired by Roland Petit's ballet "Proust, or Intermittences of the Heart" based on the eponymous work of Marcel Proust, with fifteen new large-format paintings. Toni Piñera is again curator. On the opening day, the jazz pianist Harold Lopez Nussa, friend of the painter, plays one of the songs from his album "Sobre el Atelier", composed in memory of his grandfather Leonel Lopez-Nussa, painter, writer and critic of Cuban art.

During the same period, from 2007 to 2009, Jeannine participated in group exhibitions in Spain (University of Madrid) and Cuba, during the Havana Biennial.

From 2010, Jeannine Achón left Havana and moved to Zagreb, Croatia, where her husband, a French diplomat, was posted. Since 2015, she is based in Toulouse (France).

After two years of work, she produced a series of fifteen large paintings, grouped in a series called "Ashé". Here is what she said about it: "The ashé is a deeply embedded concept in Cuban culture and spirituality; it is the primordial breath, the vital energy, the world's soul. It is a power made of pure energy. I tried to get a little bit closer to this symbolic world and share it through this series of abstract paintings named by some orishas, its deities. When I paint, I try to open doors and paths to the imagination. I don’t see it as a mirror, but as a passage, toward the others and our interiority."

In April 2013, her first presentation was done in Varaždin, historic city in northern Croatia, at the Galerijski Centar Varaždin. Ivan Mesek was the curator. The exhibition was then presented at the Galerija matice hrvatske, in Zagreb, with Pf Vanja Babić as curator in May 2013.
