= Juan Andrés Rodríguez (artist) =

- Born: 1930; Sancti Spiritus, Cuba
- Died: 1995 (aged 64–65); Sancti Spíritus, Cuba
- Other names: El Monje
- Education: Centro Vocacional de Artes Plásticas, Sancti Spíritus
- Known for: Painting and drawing
- Awards: Prize in Drawing, VI Salón Oscar Fernández Morera (1987–1989)

Juan Andrés Rodríguez better known by his artistic name El Monje (born November 1930, Sancti Spiritus, Cuba; died 1995, Sancti Spiritus). He was a Cuban artist specializing in painting and drawing.

== Education ==
At the Centro Vocacional de Artes Plásticas in Sancti Spiritus, he studied fine art. From 1969 to 1995, he was a member of the Unión de Escritores y Artistas de Cuba (UNEAC).

== Individual exhibitions ==
In 1971 he showed his works at the Spanish-Cuban Friendship Society, Havana. Another solo show was the 1990 exhibition named Güijes de El Monje, at the Martí Library, Santa Clara, Villa Clara Province.

== Collective exhibitions ==
Rodriguez's works have been exhibited in several galleries and museums, such as the International Art Center in Havana. In 1976 he was included in the Salón Pintores Villareños, an exhibition that took place in Cienfuegos. In the same year he was part of An Exhibition of Eleven Cuban Primitive Artists at The Institute of Jamaica, Kingston, Jamaica. One of his most recent shows was Tradición y modernidad en el arte espirituano, displayed in the Galería de Arte Universal, Santiago de Cuba, in 1996.

== Awards ==
During 1987, 1988 and 1989 he won a Prize in Drawing at the VI Salón Oscar Fernández Morera, Centro Provincial de Artes Plásticas y Diseño, Sancti Spiritus.
