= Emilio Hector Rodriguez =

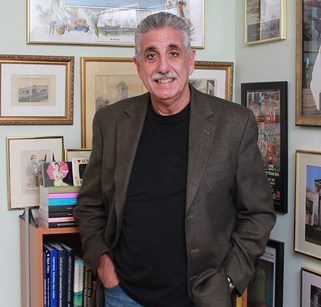
- Born: September 26, 1950 (age 75); Sancti Spiritus, Cuba
- Education: University of Havana (Universidad de La Habana), Havana, Cuba
- Occupations: Visual Artist - Founder and Director of 7 PLUS ONE ART PROJECT

Emilio Hector Rodriguez (born September 26, 1950, in Sancti Spíritus, Cuba) is a Cuban-American artist. His current work is abstract painting and fine art photography. He resides in Miami, Florida, USA. Rodríguez was born in the colonial village of Sancti Spíritus, Cuba, in 1950. His family moved to La Habana in 1953. He started drawing and experimenting with oil paint and tempera at the age of 12. While a student at the Instituto Pre-Universitario de Marianao (Marianao Senior High School), he participated in several workshops sponsored by San Alejandro Arts Academy.

== Biography ==
Rodriguez began painting with acrylic guided by the Cuban painter Dominica Alcántara in 2005 at the “Latin Quarter Cultural Center” in Miami. Abstract painting became his last interest and passion. He has been painting abstracts since 2007.

In 2010 Emilio Héctor presented a group of abstract artists to commemorate a Century since the first abstract artwork by Wassily Kandisnsky. This presentation later continued to become the “7 Plus One Art Project” which has been presenting abstract art exhibitions in diverse institutions such as Miami Dade College, the Koubek Center, Saint Thomas University and the Miami Hispanic Cultural Arts Center.

In 2014 Emilio Héctor was invited to become a member of The Cuban American Phototheque Foundation in recognition of his work in the field of photography.

== Awards ==
- International Best Artists Award: 2023 FIAG International Art Festival, Kil-hwan Museum of Art - Myung Tae-sook, South Korea (2023)
- Premio de Honor (Honorable Prize): Artistes del Món - BCM Art Gallery - Barcelona, Spain (2013).
- Mención de Honor (Honorable Mention): Muestra Internacional de Arte de Gijón - Sala Aristas - Gijón, Spain (2013).
- Special Recognition: 13th Annual Abstraction Juried Online International Art Exhibition - Omaha, Nebraska (2011)

== Recognitions ==
- Certificate of recognition for his important contribution to the community and Spanish culture: Real Liga Naval Española - Miami (2018).
- Prize "El Arcangel Dorado" 2018: PFA TV PRODUCTIONS - Miami (2018).
- Diploma of recognition for his contribution to Caritate Magazine as photographer and interviewer: APOGEO Fundation and CARITATE magazine - Miami (2017).
