= Jesús Selgas Cepero =

- Jesús Selgas Cepero
- Born: 1951 (age 74–75); Cienfuegos, Cuba
- Education: Escuela Nacional de Arte (ENA), Havana (1968–1970); Escuela Nacional de Diseño, Havana (graduated 1980)
- Alma mater: Fashion Institute of Design(Photography course, 1988)
- Known for: Painting; tapestry; installations; photography
- Notable work: Acuarelas y Tapices; Icons; Remembrances
- Awards: First Prize (Tapestry), Museo de Artes Decorativas, Havana (1977); Marshall Cummings Prize, New York Citywide Art Competition (1989)

Jesús Selgas Cepero (born 24 December 1951) is a Cuban artist specializing in painting, tapestry, and installations.

Selgas was born in Cienfuegos, Cuba, and attended the Escuela Nacional de Arte (ENA) in Havana between 1968 and 1970. He went on to study at Havana's Escuela Nacional de Diseño, graduating in 1980. He moved to New York the same year, and in 1988 passed a course in photography at the Fashion Institute of Design.

== Individual exhibitions ==
In 1976 Selgas held his first personal exhibition, under the name Acuarelas y Tapices ("Gouaches and Tapestries") at the Teatro Nacional de Guiñol, Havana, Cuba. In 1982, along with two other Cuban artists, he exhibited at the show Three Cuban Painters at Middlesex County College in Edison, New Jersey. Among other exhibitions during the period he displayed in 1990 at the Genesis Gallery, Chicago, under the name "Selgas. Icons". In 1995 he exhibited a show titled Remembrances at the New World Gallery in Düsseldorf, Germany.

== Collective exhibitions ==
Selgas's work appeared in 1977's Trabajos en fibra exhibition at the Havana Museo de Artes Decorativas. He participated also in the Genesis Gallery's 1989–90 Christmas show, in New York: Up & Coming Artists, an exhibition of the Canadian Imperial Bank Collection in New York, and in Mariel: A Decade After at the Museo Cubano de Arte y Cultura, Miami, Florida. In 1995 his work appeared in Art. Exhibit and Silent Auction of Works by Contemporary Artists at New York's Jadite Galleries.

== Awards ==
Salgas was in 1977 awarded first prize for tapestry by the Havana Museo de Artes Decorativas. In 1989 he received the Marshall Cummings Prize at the New York Citywide Art Competition.
