= Julio Larraz =

Cuban artist

Julio Fernández Larraz
- Born: 12 March 1944; Havana, Cuba
- Other names: Julio Fernández Larraz; Julio Fernández; Julio Larraz
- Occupations: cartoonist; painter; sculptor

Julio César Ernesto Fernández Larraz (born 12 March 1944) is a Cuban artist. He has lived in the United States since 1961. He first worked as a political caricaturist and cartoonist, signing his work Julio Fernandez. In the 1970s, he began to paint and changed his signature to Julio Larraz.

== Life ==
Julio Fernandez Larraz was born in Havana, Cuba on 12 March 1944. His family were owners of the Cuban newspaper La Discusión. In 1961, the year of the failed American invasion of Cuba, the family fled the island for Miami, Florida, later moving to Washington, D.C., and then to New York City. Larraz first worked as a political caricaturist and cartoonist, signing his work "Julio Fernandez". His caricatures of political figures such as Indira Gandhi, Golda Meir and Richard Nixon were published in Esquire magazine, The New York Times, The New York Times Magazine, New York Magazine, Rolling Stone and The Washington Post. A caricature of Nixon as Louis XIV, captioned "L'état, c'est moi", was used on the cover of Time magazine.

White House Enemies or How We Made the Dean's List (Publisher: Signet / New American Library, 1973)

THE PERFECT WAGNERITE, A COMMENTARY ON THE NIBLUNG'S RING (Time-Life Records Special Edition, 1972)

Why they call it politics : a guide to America's Government (Harcourt Brace Jovanovich, second edition, 1974)

The Saturday night special, and other guns with which Americans won the West, protected bootleg franchises, slew wildlife, robbed countless banks, shot husbands purposely and by mistake, and killed presidents—together with the debate over continuing same (New York, Charterhouse, 1973)

== Work ==
Julio Larraz's first solo exhibitions was in 1971 at the Pyramid Gallery in Washington D.C. An exhibition of his work was held at the Boca Raton Museum of Art in Boca Raton, Florida, in 1998.

== Latest individual exhibitions ==
=== Poesia, Potere, Ironia 2025 ===
- Contini Galleria d'Arte, Sutri, Italy

=== 80 Circumnavigations of the Sun 2024 ===
- Ascaso Gallery, Miami, Florida.
- Galería Duque Arango, Mexico City, Mexico
- Art of the World Gallery, Huston, Texas

== Collective exhibitions ==
In 1976, Larraz's work was chosen for Exhibition of Works by Candidates for Art Awards at the American Academy of Art and Letters/National Institute of Arts and Letters, New York. In 1985 Foire Internationale d’Art Contemporain (FIAC) was seen at the Grand Palais, Paris; and in 1992 Exposición arte cubano: Pasado y presente obra importante was exhibited at Gary Nader Fine Art, Coral Gables, Florida.

== Awards ==
In 1975, Larraz won the Cintas Foundation Fellowship from the Institute of International Education, New York. In 1977, he was awarded the Acquisition Prize. Childe Hassam Fund Purchase Exhibition from the American Academy of Arts and Letters and Institute of Arts & Letters, New York.
