= Hugo Consuegra =

Cuban-born artist

- Born: Hugo Consuegra Sosa; October 26, 1929; Havana, Cuba
- Died: January 24, 2003 (aged 73); New York City, New York, U.S.
- Education: Escuela Nacional de Bellas Artes "San Alejandro"; University of Havana
- Known for: Painting, drawing, engraving, architecture
- Movement: Abstract Expressionism; Los Once
- Awards: Cintas Foundation Fellowship

Hugo Consuegra (born Hugo Consuegra Sosa October 26, 1929 in Havana, Cuba – January 24th 2003 in New York City, New York) was a Cuban-born artist and architect who, in 1953, became one of the founding members of Los Once (The Eleven), a group of young abstract expressionist artists which included the core members Guido Llinás, Raul Martinez, Tomás Oliva and Antonio Vidal. The group broke away from the representational style prevalent at the time in Cuba and produced its largest volume of work between 1953 and 1955. Consuegra and four of the original 11 continued to exhibit in what became known as the post-revolutionary avant-garde movement in Cuba. Consuegra was also a Professor of Art History at Havana University’s School of Architecture (1960–5).

His first solo exhibition was held in 1953 at the Lyceum in Havana. As part of Los Once (The Eleven), Consuegra was instrumental in introducing abstract expressionism to Cuba. His award-winning artwork was widely exhibited in Cuba and internationally until he received political asylum in Spain in 1967. He moved to New York three years later continuing his painting, drawing and engraving career. He became an American citizen in 1975.

Throughout his career, Consuegra widely exhibited his work in such cities as: Havana, New York, Paris, Cadiz (Spain), and Sao Paulo, among others. His work is part of major collections including Casa de las Américas (Havana), Cintas Foundation (New York), Museo Nacional de Bellas Artes (Havana), Art Museum of the Americas (Washington D.C.), and the Rodríguez Collection (Miami), among others. He was awarded the Cintas Foundation Fellowship.

Edmundo Desnoes’ 1961 essay invites us to consider the artist’s impact: “The paintings of Hugo Consuegra always give us the impression of having penetrated into an occult world: of having descended into an underworld or of stumbling onto the private life of an unknown family. His paintings always produce a subjective effect. His burnished blues, his tanned browns, his nightmare landscapes with black skies and desolated countrysides, belong to the world of the inner personality. There are areas in which color concentrates and seems to form thick drops, and other places in which it evaporates or is forgotten. His canvases are always resolved in genuine good taste.”

== Education ==
Consuegra studied at the  Escuela Nacional de Bellas Artes “San Alejandro”in Havana from 1943–1947. He received music lessons in piano at the Conservatorio Hubert de Blanck in Havana, between 1941–1947 and in 1955 graduated from the University of Havana in Architecture.

== Exhibitions ==
Consuegra has had personal exhibitions such as: Exposición Hugo Consuegra. Oleos, Acuarelas, Dibujos in 1953 at the Lyceum in Havana; in 1971 Hugo Consuegra. “Curriculum Vitae” at Cisneros Gallery, New York City;in 1993 An Exhibition of Contemporary Cuban Art by Hugo Consuegra at the Cantor Seinuk Group in New York City and in 1993 Hugo Consuegra, Guido Llinás, Tomás Oliva, a Reunion at the Jadite Galleries, New York City.

He has formed part of many collective exhibitions such as the Salón Anual de Pintura y Escultura in 1946 and 1947 at the National Museum of Fine Arts of Havana; in 1962 3éme Biennale de Paris at Musée d’Art Moderne de la Ville de Paris, Paris, France; in 1969 Maestros Hispánicos de Hoy in the Museo de Bellas Artes de Cadiz, Spain; in 1987 Abstract Visions, in Museum of Contemporary Hispanic Art in New York City; and in 1997 Pinturas del Silencio at the Galería La Acacia in Havana.

His work can be found in the permanent collections of the Museo Nacional de Bellas Artes and Casa de las Américas, both in Havana; the Oscar B. Cintas Foundation in New York City; the Jersey City Museum of Art in New Jersey; the National Museum of Fine Arts of Havana; the Museum of Modern Art of Latin America in Washington, D.C. as well as the Pan American Union also in Washington, D.C.; the Oscar B. Cintas Foundation in New York City; the Jersey City Museum of Art in New Jersey, the Museo de Barranquilla in Colombia, the Museo de Bellas Artes in Caracas, Venezuela, the Museo de Bellas Artes in San Juan, Puerto Rico and the Miami-Dade Public Library, among others.

A large marble mural by Consuegra was in the lobby of the Time & Life Building, in New York’s Rockefeller Center. Consuegra was already serving as the architect for the Crown Heights Brooklyn Utica Avenue subway station when his responsibilities were expanded to include the addition of artwork. Consuegra’s design features a series of ceramic tile panels on the platform walls and bronze medallions which revolve around motifs of the sun and moon. The art, titled “Good Morning and Good Night,” mirrors the flow of riders going to and from the station to their homes each day. The “Good Morning” portion of the artwork is on the inbound side of the station, which fills in the morning hours and features images of the sun rising, while the “Good Night” segment welcomes travelers home as the evening arrives with scenes of the moon high above the night sky. 

Numerous key art galleries and museums such as Passerelle Centre d'Art Contemporain, Brest have featured Hugo Consuegra's work. Consuegra has been featured in articles for Art Viewer and ARTnews. A recent article is Abstractions Cubaines des Années 50 à Nos Jours at Passerelle Centre d’Art Contemporain written for Art Viewer in January 2023.

== Awards ==
Consuegra has obtained many awards and recognitions such as the Gold Medal of Landscape in the XX Salón de Bellas Artes(1948) at the National Museum of Fine Arts of Havana; in 1960 Honorable Mention in Segunda Bienal Interamericana de México at the Palacio de Bellas Artes, Museo Nacional de Arte Moderno, Mexico City, Mexico and Cintas Foundation Fellowship, New York.
