= Cuban art =

Cuban art is an exceptionally diverse cultural blend of North American, South American, European, and African elements, reflecting the diverse demographic makeup of the island. Cuban artists embraced European modernism, and the early part of the 20th century saw a growth in Cuban avant-garde movements, which were characterized by the mixing of modern artistic genres. Some of the more celebrated 20th-century Cuban artists include Amelia Peláez (1896–1968), best known for a series of mural projects, and painter Wifredo Lam (December 8, 1902 – September 11, 1982), who created a highly personal version of modern primitivism. The Cuban-born painter Federico Beltran Masses (1885–1949), was renowned as a colorist whose seductive portrayals of women sometimes made overt references to the tropical settings of his childhood.

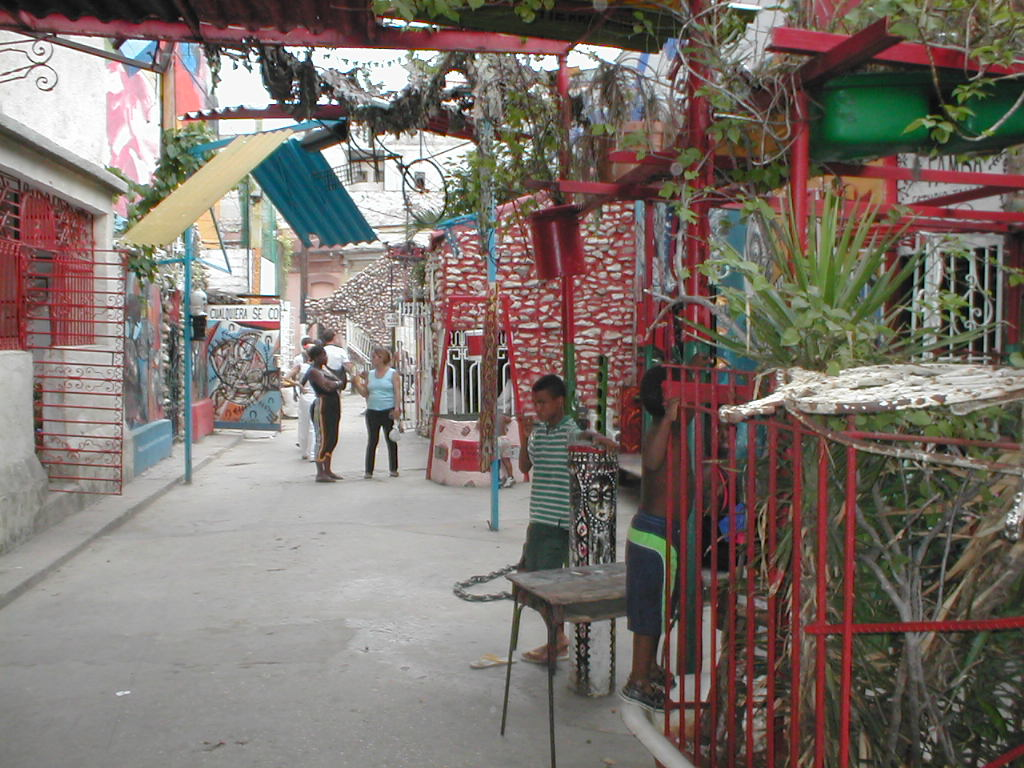
In Centro Habana, a small neighborhood of artists have transformed the walls around them. October 2002

Better known internationally is the work of photographer Alberto Korda, whose photographs following the early days of the Cuban Revolution included a picture of Che Guevara which was to become one of the most recognizable images of the 20th century.

There is a flourishing street art movement influenced by Latin American artists José Guadalupe Posada and the muralist Diego Rivera.

After the Cuban Revolution of 1959, some artists felt it was in their best interests to leave Cuba and produce their art, while others stayed behind, either happy or merely content to be creating art in Cuba, which was sponsored by the government. Because it was state-sponsored, implied censorship occurred, since artists wouldn't want to make art that was against the revolutionary movement as that was the source of their funding. It was during the 1980s in which art began to reflect true uninfluenced expression. The "rebirth" of expression in Cuban art was greatly affected by the emergence of a new generation of Cubans, which did not remember the revolution directly.

In 1981 Cubans saw the introduction of "Volumen Uno", a series of one-man exhibitions featuring contemporary Cuban artists. Three years later, the introduction of the "Havana Bienal" assisted in the further progression of the liberation of art and free speech therein.

== Colonial Era ==
Throughout most of its 400 years under Spanish rule, Cuba and specifically Havana functioned as the primary entrepôt of Spain's empire in the Americas, with a population of merchants, administrators, and professionals who were interested in supporting the arts. In the 16th century, painters and sculptors began arriving from Europe to decorate Cuban churches and public buildings. By the mid-1700s, native-born artists working in the European tradition were active in Cuba.

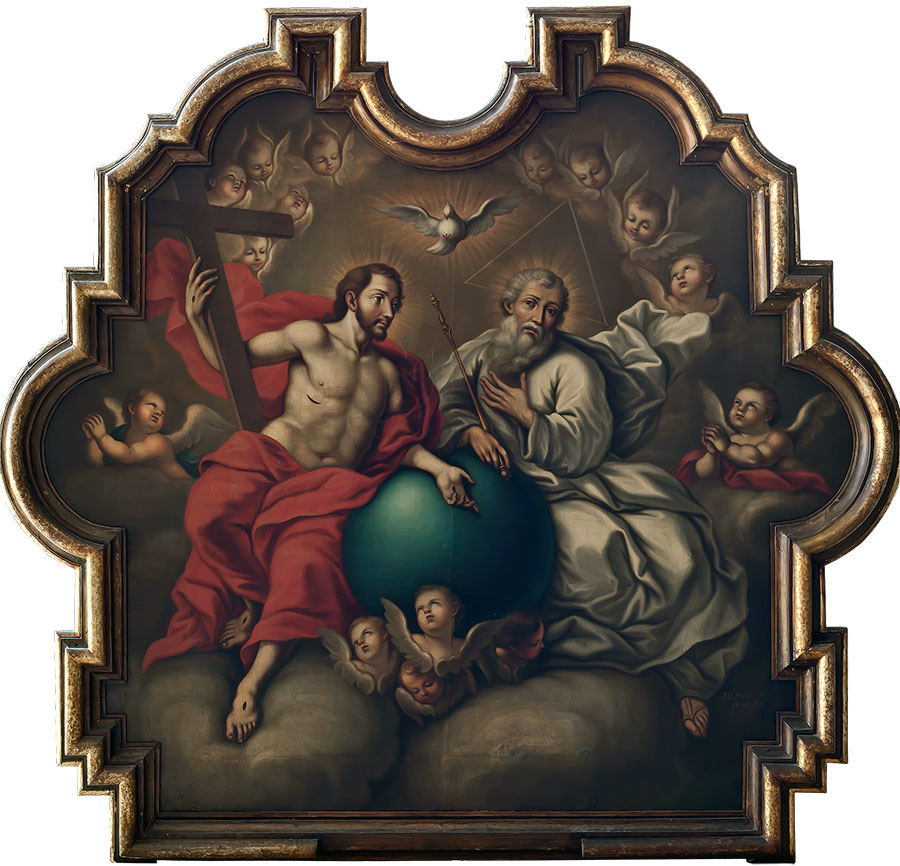
Yeyo Yeyo, José Nicolás de Escalera, ca. 1770. Collection of the National Museum of Fine Art, Havana.

The first of these to leave a substantial, identifiable body of work was José Nicolás de la Escalera (1734 – 1804). Though mostly absent of originality, his religious scenes - particularly those decorating the cupola and altar of the Church of Santa María del Rosario near Havana - are spectacular, and include the first fine art depictions of Black Cuban slaves.

Vicente Escobar (1762 - 1834) was a mestizo whose skill as a portraitist made him popular among Cuba's elite. Though having no formal art education himself, he opened what was possibly Cuba's first painting workshop/studio, and later graduated with honors from the Real Academia de Bellas Artes de San Fernando in Madrid. His portraiture was firmly in the European Classical style but had a distinctive freshness and energy.

A slave revolt culminating in neighboring Haiti's declaration of independence in 1804 proved something of a windfall for Cuba, as refugee plantation owners and their slaves relocated to the underdeveloped, underpopulated eastern portion of the island. However, the success of Toussaint and Dessalines' slave uprising spread intense anxiety throughout the Caribbean, and one response to it was the growth of costumbrismo - realist yet romanticized views of day-to-day life - in Cuban art.

Tipos y Costumbres de la Isla de Cuba, Victor Patricio Landaluze, 1881.

A leading early artist in this genre was Spanish-born Víctor Patricio de Landaluze (1830 - 1889), whose paintings depicted plantation life as rough but essentially natural and harmonious. His political cartoons for the magazine El Almendares took a more satirical view of the urbanized "Creole aristocracy". Opposed to Cuban independence, Landaluze eventually fell out of favor with the public, but his work remains valued for capturing the atmosphere and attitudes of his time.

On January 11, 1818, the Academia Nacional de Bellas Artes San Alejandro (known as the "Academy San Alejandro", in honor of an important founder/benefactor) was established in Havana, under the direction of Frenchman Jean Baptiste Vermay. The oldest art academy in Latin America, it is the second-oldest institution of higher education in Cuba, after the University of Havana. Continuing to the present day, it has produced many of Cuba's most important artists.

By the later 19th-century landscape painting had become popular, with artists such as Miguel Arias Bardou, Guillermo Collazo, José Abreu Morell, and José Joaquín Tejada creating scenes featuring Cuba's lush natural environment. Despite the benign content of their work, many artists (perhaps most prominently, Collazo) were strong supporters of Cuban independence, and some were forced into exile.

In 1898 Spain's four centuries of rule over Cuba came to an end when U.S. troops intervened on the side of rebel fighters. Independence, however, proved illusory, with the United States controlling Cuba's foreign policy and much of its economy, while strong-man presidents did little to foster freedom and democracy. Artists of the early Republican era continued much as before, painting landscapes and scenes of Cuban life in the traditional European style, some of them showing light touches of Impressionism. Many, such as Antonio Sanchez Araujo, Armando Menocal, Antonio Rodriguez Morey, Domingo Ramos Enriquez, and Leopoldo Romañach, went on to become instructors or administrators at the Academy San Alejandro and other arts institutions. The Modernist movements which convulsed European art early in the 20th century initially had little impact on the closed, academic world of contemporary Cuban art.

== Vanguardia artists ==
In the late 19th century, landscapes dominated Cuban art and classicism was still the preferred genre. The radical artistic movements that transformed European art in the first decades of the century arrived in Latin America in the 1920s to form part of a vigorous current of artistic, cultural, and social innovation.

¿Quiere Mas Café Don Nicolas?, Antonio Gattorno, ca. 1938.

By the late 1920s, the Vanguardia artists had rejected the conventions of Cuba's national art academy, the Escuela Nacional de Bellas Artes “San Alejandro”, in Havana, which most of them had attended. In their formative years, many had lived in Paris, where they studied and absorbed the tenets of Surrealism, Cubism, and modernist Primitivism. Modernism burst on the Cuban scene as part of the critical movement of national regeneration that arose in opposition to the dictatorship of Gerardo Machado, American neo-colonial control, and the consequent economic crisis. They returned to Cuba committed to new artistic innovation and keen to embrace the heritage of their island. These artists became increasingly political in their ideology, viewing the rural poor as symbols of national identity in contrast to the ruling elite of post-independence Cuba. Vanguard leader Eduardo Abela, a painter who studied in Paris, was typical of the movement. He discovered his homeland Cuba from abroad, apparently motivated by a combination of distance and nostalgia. On his return, Abela entered a highly productive period of work. His murals of Cuban life were complemented by cartoons which became social critiques of Cuban life under the authoritarian Machado regime.

Pioneers of the movement included Abela, Antonio Gattorno, Victor Manuel, Fidelio Ponce de León, and Carlos Enríquez Gómez. Born around the turn of the century, these artists grew up amidst the turmoil of constructing a new nation and reached maturity when Cubans were engaged in discovering and inventing a national identity. They fully shared in the sense of confidence, renovation, and nationalism that characterized Cuban progressive intellectuals in the second quarter of the twentieth century.

Antonio Gattorno (1904 - 1980) and Eduardo Abela (1889 - 1965) were the earliest painters of their generation to adapt modern European and Mexican art to the interpretation of their Cuban subjects. They also found in the directness and idealization of early Renaissance painting an effective model for their expression of Cuban themes. These painters' criollo images, for all their differences, shared a modern primitivist view of Cuba as an exotic, timeless, rural land inhabited by simple and sensual, if also sad and melancholic people. Although rooted in Cuba's natural and cultural environment, the vision of lo Cubano (the Cuban) was far removed from contemporary historical reality. Instead, it was based on an ideal conception of Patria that had been a component of Cuban nationalism and art since the nineteenth century.

This idealized vision featured strongly in the portraits and landscapes of Victor Manuel (1897 - 1969), who was particularly impressed by the works of Paul Cézanne and Paul Gauguin during his two relatively brief stays in Paris. A San Alejandro graduate highly skilled in drawing and composition, Manuel chose to apply primitivist simplicity to his Cuban subjects - a favorite being the female face - and brought out qualities of melancholy and strength, as captured in La Gitana Tropical (The Tropical Gipsy, 1929), which is considered by critics to be one of the defining pieces of Cuban Avant-garde art.

The emphasis which Carlos Enríquez (1900 - 1957) and Fidelio Ponce (1895 - 1949) placed on the themes of change, transformation, and death have had an enduring impact on Cuban art. Enríquez and Ponce represent two approaches to death: the first marked by exuberant flight and emotion; the second by moody contemplation. If Enríquez painted the delirium after the triumphed siege, Ponce painted the anteroom of grief. Enríquez was a self-taught painter from a wealthy family, while Ponce, though he had attended the San Alejandro Academy, spent his life in poverty. What these two most original and distinctive of the Vanguardia painters had in common - aside from severe problems with alcoholism - was that neither had studied in Europe.

Early in 1927, solo exhibitions were held for Victor Manuel and Antonio Gattorno at Havana’s Association of Painters and Sculptors, followed in May by the ‘’First Exposition of New Art’’, a group show featuring mostly Cuban modernists. Trumpeted by the avant-garde journal ‘’Revista de Avance’’, these well-received shows were important strides towards the acceptance of modern art in Cuba.

The masters of the first generation of Cuban modernism set the stage for the prevalence of certain themes that would govern Cuban art after 1930, and which would have varying degrees of impact on those generations that would later emerge entirely in exile after 1960. Between 1934 and 1940, and still reeling from the overthrow of Machado, Cuba was searching for its cultural identity in its European and African roots. The landscape, flora, fauna, and lore of the island, as well as its peasants - the often neglected foundation of Cuba’s soul and economy - emerged in its art.

Wifredo Lam (1902 - 1982), a Cuban of Chinese, Spanish, and African ancestry, had little direct involvement with the Havana Vanguardia, but was of the same generation and had similar motivations and experiences with his art. After attending the San Alejandro Academy, he initially took the more traditional route of studying in Madrid, and lived and worked in Spain for many years. After serving in the Spanish Civil War, he fled to Paris, where he came under the wing of Pablo Picasso, who kindled Lam’s interest in African sculpture. Lam also befriended the Surrealist poet/philosopher André Breton. In Paris, Wilfredo Lam met José Sainz, a fellow Cuban, and the two remained friends after Lam returned to Cuba. In the artist’s life, Sainz had a significant role in tying his art to his Afro-Cuban and Caribbean heritage, which would subsequently have a significant impact on his output. Returning to Cuba in 1941 after two decades abroad, Lam was enchanted, dismayed, and powerfully inspired by his homeland. He rapidly developed his mature style, which incorporated elements of Cubism, Surrealism, and African art, along with imagery of the Santeria rituals he’d grown up around. In 1943 he painted ‘’The Jungle’’, which is considered to be among the masterpieces of Cuban art.

Amelia Peláez (1896 - 1968) was the sole major female artist of the Vanguardia. A San Alejandro graduate, she studied and worked for several years in Paris, where, before her return to Havana in 1934, she absorbed the influence of Henri Matisse and, especially, the Cubism of Pablo Picasso and Georges Braque. During her long career, she worked in a variety of media, including painting, pottery, and mosaic, and explored a variety of subjects and themes, but whether creating her abstracted still life paintings or her famed large scale public murals, her work consistently employed vivid color and elaborate composition, as well as representations of Cuba’s tropical flora and Havana’s ubiquitous Spanish Colonial architectural motifs. For all its colorful energy, however, French critic Francis de Miomandre sensed in her work “a closed, completely enigmatic world, haunted by an enigmatic silence.” She, Lam, and Enríquez have come to be considered Cuban art’s most distinctive and definitive stylists.

By 1935 the Vanguardia was recognized in Cuba as an important cultural force and began to gain considerable notice internationally. Major exhibitions of Cuban modern art were held in the United States and throughout Latin America in the late 1930s and 40s. Wrote Albert H. Barr, Jr., organizer of the ‘’Modern Cuban Painters’’ exhibition at New York’s Museum of Modern Art in 1944, “We may be grateful for that reckless exuberance, gaiety, candor, and love of life which the Cuban painters show perhaps more than the artists of any other school.” The traveling version of this exhibition, ‘’Cuban Painting Today’’, expanded visibility for the group in 12 cities: Utica, Chicago, Washington, DC, St. Paul, Minneapolis, Portland, Seattle, San Francisco, Louisville, Alexandria, Chapel Hill, and Winter Park.

Modern Cuban art was at last seen in Paris, France, in an exhibition at the Musée National d’Art Moderne in 1951.

The artists themselves saw little material benefit from the growth of interest in modern Cuban art. Occasional purchase awards were doled out, as at the First National Salon of Painting and Sculpture in 1935, but there was no consistent system of patronage, and commissions for Cuba’s avant-gardists were rare. Most subsisted on low-paying teaching jobs and commercial work; a few, such as Enríquez and Pelaez, had means of support via their families, and some, such as Ponce and Manuel, lived in poverty. The only one of them to eventually command high prices for his work while still living was Wifredo Lam.

Other notable artists of the original vanguardia were Jorge Arche, Marcelo Pogolotti, Aristides Fernandez, Rafael Blanco, Domingo Ravenet, Alberto Peña, and Lorenzo Romero Arciaga. The Second National Salon of Painting and Sculpture in 1938 brought to the fore a second generation of modern artists which included Cundo Bermudez, Mario Carreño, Rita Longa, Alfredo Lozano, Luis Martinez-Pedro, and René Portocarrero

By the late 1940s, the first generation of vanguard artists had dispersed, pursuing their individual careers. Lam went on to great success, living mainly in Paris after 1952. Arche, Fernandez, and Peña died young; Enríquez and Ponce both achieved some international recognition before dying in middle-age. Others, such as Gattorno and Pogolotti, left Cuba and took their art in entirely new directions; still more emigrated after the Cuban Revolution of 1959, which left Cuban artists isolated from art developments and markets in the United States and Europe. Several, such as Pelaez, Abela, and Manuel, continued to produce work in Cuba.

The Vanguardia artists received international recognition in 2003 with the Modern Cuban Painting exhibition at the Museum of Modern Art in New York, subsequently shown in Paris. Modern Cuban artists continue to do significant work in this tradition, including Juan Ramón Valdés Gómez (called Yiki) and José Toirac.

== Naïve art ==
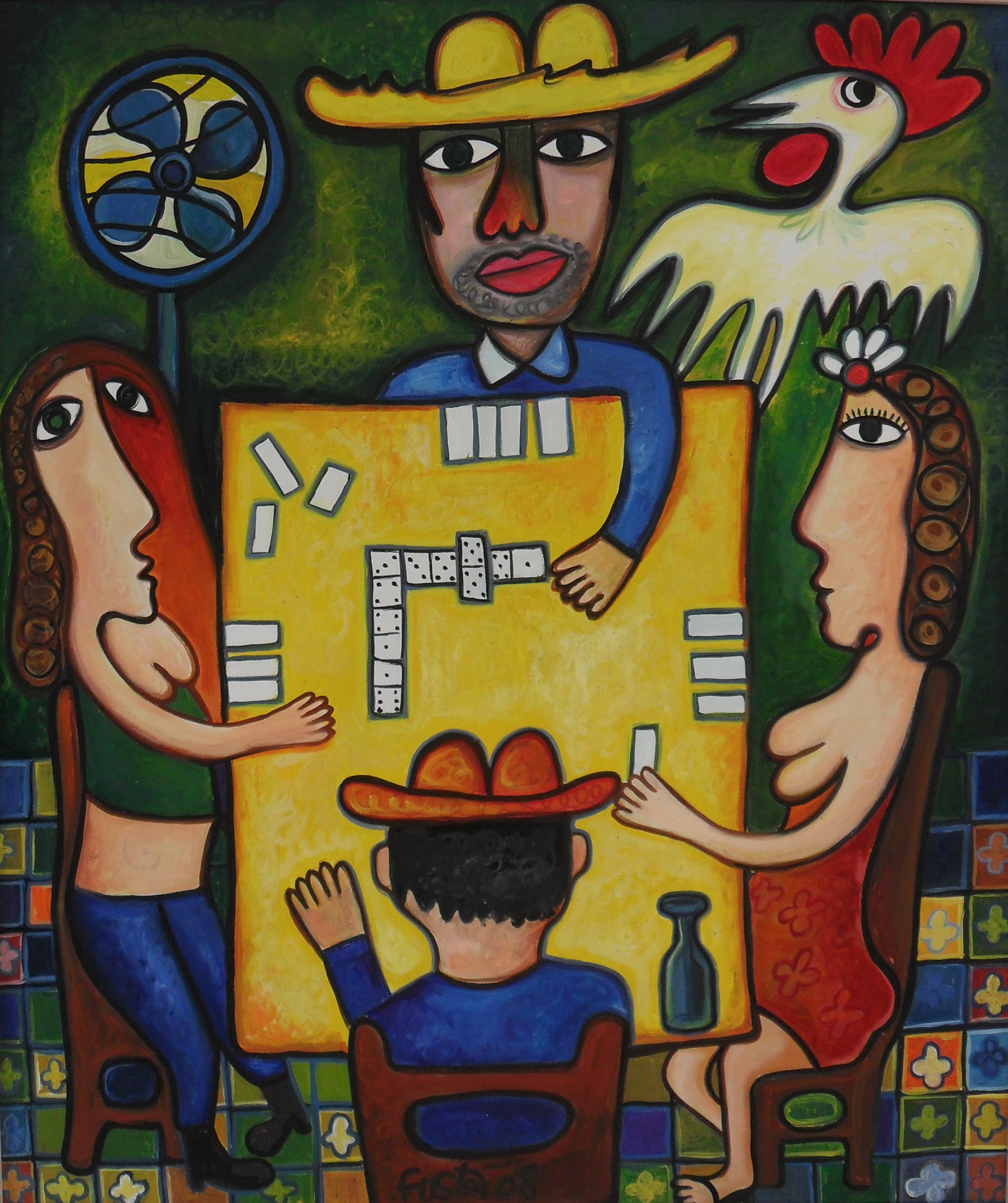
Juego de Domino (The Domino Players), oil on canvas, 2008, José Rodríguez Fuster.

According to European and North American Art critics, Naïve art is usually recognized by its childlike freshness and amateurish qualities, such as lack of accurate perspective, little or no modeling, and bold coloration. Artists who work in this style are generally acknowledged as favoring a more "primitive" or "folk" style of art. The term naïve itself can be problematic; usually meaning an artist is self-taught, it has been used in the past by academic artists or critics as a derogatory term, since naïve artists tend to ignore the basic rules of art. Despite their disregard for academic conventions, naïve artists are often quite sophisticated in their personal forms of artistic expression.

The colors used in Cuban naïve art are especially vivid, with artists using the vibrant hues of their tropical home to present an idealized view of rural life, with spiritual references to Catholicism and Santeria's Orichas (deities), legends, and other aspects of Afro-Cuban culture, past and present. This naïve style of art portrays the typical Cuban worldview of the enjoyment of life despite its hardships

In the 1950s, American tourism in Cuba created a great demand for folkloric and picturesque art, leading to increased production of what came to be known as "tourist art", most of which was classified as naïve. At the time this art was seen as a "backward, barbaric, and crude form of expression that must be swept away," rather than an authentic representation of a living culture. After the Cuban Revolution of 1959, educational, cultural, and artistic activities were encouraged, with artists able to attend the nation's free-access art schools (Escuelas Nacionales de Arte—now known as Instituto Superior de Arte). Even so, whether due to physical isolation or disinterest in the world of academic painting, there remained a large number of self-taught Ingenuous or Spontaneous painters. Many of these artists joined together to form the Movement of Popular Artists in the early 1960s. Although this and other cooperative efforts waned over the following decades, the artists themselves continued to paint.

Due to Cuban national pride in academic achievement and artistic training, it had been considered demeaning to be called a naïve artist in the early years after the Revolution. Since naïve artists were not generally recognized by the government as professional artists, they were not taken seriously by the arts community at large and were at times harassed, their art sales being claimed illegal activity by the Cuban government. In the late 20th century, however, this attitude began to change.

In 1997, Sandra Levinson, executive director of the Center for Cuban Studies Art Space in New York City, organized Naïve Art in Cuba, a first-of-its-kind exhibition at the Metropolitan Arts Center featuring the art of fourteen Cuban naïve artists, in addition to the eight members of the Grupo Bayate artist's collective from Mella, Santiago de Cuba. These artists were discovered during a 1996 trip to Cuba by Levinson, Olga Hirshhorn, and others, who crisscrossed the island searching for examples of this style of art, of which so little had previously been seen in the United States

The unofficial head of Grupo Bayate is Luis Rodríguez Arias (born 1950), a baker by profession. He is known as el maestro to differentiate him from his son, artist Luis Rodríguez Ricardo (born 1966), who calls himself el Estudiante. Both were represented in the Naïve Art from Cuba exhibition, which ran from September 11 to October 10, 1997.

Luis El estudiante Rodriguez is among the most prominent Cuban Naïve painters. He began painting at eighteen years of age; he has described his first painting, of a girlfriend's home, as "horrible". After serving in the army and working in construction, he was assigned to farm labor during Cuba's "special period". In those years he began to work with sculpture as a way to supplement his income, turning to paint a few years later. Like most naïve artists, he finds inspiration for his work in the experiences of his daily life: religious rituals and the events and people of his community. Having grown up in a neighborhood of mostly Haitian families, he is well aware of their struggles; he sometimes describes his work as "polemic". In January 1997, el Estudiante held a one-man show in Santiago de Cuba's largest and most prestigious gallery, Oriente, and continues to take part in exhibitions held by Grupo Bayate. In June 2002 his work was described as "riotously colorful and stacked like a rush-hour train" in a New York Times article entitled "Ebullient Cubans Make a Lot Out of a Little", which also speaks of the art-market success of his naïve style.

Another artist featured in the 1997 Metropolitan Arts Center's Naïve Art from Cuba exhibition was Julián Espinoza Rebolledo, also known as Wayacón. Born in 1931 (although his birth was not registered until 1941, making him "officially" 10 years younger than he actually is), Wayacón began painting as a child. Attending school only through the 3rd grade, this self-taught artist supported himself as a builder, auditing courses at the Cuban academy when he was older. In the 1950s he joined the Signos artists' group and participated in his first exhibitions in Japan and Switzerland. Although an admirer of Miró, Chagall, Degas, and Picasso, his greatest inspirations come from observing the practice of the Santeria religion. Many of his paintings show their influence, containing vivid colors and religious imagery, with an almost hallucinogenic quality.

The foremost naïve artist in Cuba is José Rodríguez Fuster, known as Fuster. In addition to his paintings and drawings, he has over the years transformed the poor suburb of Jaimanitas, Havana, into a magical, dreamlike streetscape, drawing on his expertise as a ceramist to create an environment evocative of Antoni Gaudi's famed Park Güell in Barcelona. There is a chess park, with giant boards and tables, houses individually decorated with ornate murals and domes, a riot of giant roosters, gauchos, Afro-Cuban religious figures installed by the entrance of many houses, a Fusterised theatre, public squares, and a large mural.

The primitive-outsider art of Corso de Palenzuela (b. Havana, ca.1960), a self-taught painter of Sephardic ancestry, taps a rich lode of memory for its source material, depicted in a very personal Cuban landscape. Although he emigrated to the U.S. with his family at the age of eight, his colorfully vivid workplaces great emphasis on bringing out the rich cultural heritage of his native land.

Although not technically a naive artist, Manuel Mendive is perhaps the single most important exponent of contemporary Afro-Cubanismo in the visual arts. Born in 1944 into a Santería-practicing family, he graduated from the prestigious Academia de Artes Plásticas San Alejandro in Havana in 1962 with honors in sculpture and painting.

Few naïve artists have been represented in either Contemporary Art Salons or the Biennial of Havana. However, with growing interest in the genre, there are, as of 2015, increasing numbers of academic artists who have begun to paint in this style, with greater representation for all.

== Art in Post-Revolutionary Cuba ==
In the 1960s the aftermath of the Cuban revolution brought new restrictions, causing an exodus of intellectuals and artists. The new régime required "a practice of culture as ideological propaganda, along with a stereotyped nationalism". Although government policies - driven by limited resources - did narrow artistic expression, they expanded, through education and subsidies, the number of people who could practice art, breaking down barriers through democratization and socialization. The increasing influence of the Soviet Union in the 1960s and 1970s did impact Cuban culture, but the Cuban government did not match the U.S.S.R in its degree of control over the Arts.

Ché poster, 1968, designed by Alfredo Rostgaard, based on a photograph by Alberto Korda. The poster was distributed in OSPAAAL's magazine Tricontinental.

In the 1960s government agencies such as the Commission of Revolutionary Orientation (the publishing division of the Cuban Communist Party, later renamed Editora Politica (EP)) and OSPAAAL began churning out posters for propaganda purposes. Many of these used stereotypically Soviet design features, but even some early samples showed hints of the Cuban flair for colorful and inventive graphic design, and by the late 60s, Cuban graphic art was in its heyday. Though still essentially producing propaganda, artists such as Rene Mederos, Raul Martinez, Alfredo Rostgaard, and Félix Beltran were creating vivid, powerful, and highly distinctive works which had a global influence on graphic design.

An image commonly used by Cuban graphic designers was "Guerillero Heroica", a photograph of Ché Guevara taken by Alberto Korda (b. Havana, 1928 – d. Paris, 2001). The candid shot of a moody exhausted Guevara, taken in March 1960 at a memorial service for victims of an ammunition ship explosion in Havana Harbor, became one of the world's most iconic images. It was eventually altered and adapted for everything from gum wrappers to a 90 ft. tall commemorative iron sculpture in Havana's Plaza de la Revolución. Korda was a popular fashion photographer who became a devoted revolutionary and close companion of Fidel Castro, taking thousands of shots of Castro's travels and Cuba's transformation.

Cubans remained intent on reinforcing a Cuban identity rooted in its own culture, as exemplified by the work of Grupo Antillano. The simultaneous assimilation or synthesis of the tenets of modern western art and the development of Afro-Cuban art schools and movements created a new Cuban culture. Art proliferated under state programs of sponsorship and employment during this post-revolutionary period; the programs both politicized artistic content and inspired confidence in the people within the framework of Cuba's reinvented nationalism. Nelson Dominguez and Roberto Fabelo went from Abstraction and Neoexpressionism of the 1950s, to immortalizing the proletariat, farmers, workers, and soldiers, while continuing to utilize many of the techniques they learned under the tutelage of Antonia Eiriz Vázquez. By combining nationalism with the politicization of art, artists maintained a level of freedom that continues to inspire innovation.

The Salón de Mayo (May Salon) was an art exhibition held in Havana in July 1967. Organized by Carlos Franqui, it presented works by more than a hundred artists and represented rival schools of twentieth-century art: early modernists (Picasso, Miro, Magritte); the next generation (Lam, Calder, Jacques Hérold, Stanley Hayter); and postwar (Asger Jorn, Antonio Saura, Jorge Soto. It represented the high point of artistic free expression in the decade following the revolution.

== The new art ==
The 1960s and 1970s saw the introduction of conceptual art, shifting emphasis away from craftsmanship to ideas. This often meant the elimination of objects in art production; only ideas were stated or discussed. It required an enhanced level of participation by the patron (interactive participation or a set of instructions to follow). Conceptual art, Minimalism, Earth art, and Performance art mingled together to expand the very definition of Art.

By the late 1970s, many of the graduates of the school of the arts in Cuba, "the Facultad de Artes Plasticas of the Instituto Superior de Arte" (founded in 1976) were going to work as schoolteachers, teaching art to young Cubans across the island. This provided a platform for the graduates to teach students about freedom of expression in medium, message, and style of art. It was this new level of experimentation and expression that was to enable the movement of the 1980s.

In Cuba, these new developments were naturally synthesized through the Afro-Cuban sensibility and emerged as The New Art, an art movement widely recognized as distinctly Cuban. Young artists born after the revolution rebelled against modernism and embraced conceptual art, amongst other genres. Many would carry on folkloric traditions and Santeria motifs in their individual expressions while infusing their message with humor and mockery. The art took a qualitative leap by creating international art structured on African views, not from the outside like surrealism but from the inside, alive with the cultural-spiritual complexities of their own existence.

The exhibition Volumen Uno, in 1981, wrenched open the doors for The New Art. Participants, many of whom were still in school, created a typical generational backlash by artists of the previous generation including Alberto Jorge Carol, Nelson Dominguez, and César Leal, who went on the attack against the upstarts. The group, Volumen Uno - made up of Jose Bedia, Lucy Lippard, Ana Mendieta, Ricardo Brey, Leandro Soto, Juan Francisco Elso, Flavio Garciandia, Gustavo Perez Monzon, Rubén Torres Llorca, Gory (Rogelio Lopez Marin), and Tomas Sanchez - presented a "fresh eclectic mix filtered through informalism, pop, minimalism, conceptualism, performance, graffiti and Arte Povera reconfigured and reactivated … to be critically, ethically, and organically Cuban".

Subsequently, a second and third generation emerge in context. Artists within the second generation are Consuelo Castañeda, Gustavo Ramón Acosta, Humberto Castro, Moisés Finalé, Magdalena Campos, José Franco, Carlos Alberto García, Antonio Eligio Fernández, and Marta María Pérez.

This age of artists was dedicated to people who were willing to take risks in their art and truly express themselves, rather than to express things that supported the political movement. While looking at the art of the 1980s we see a trend in the use of the shape of Cuba itself as inspiration for art. One-piece, Immediately Geographic by artist Florencio Gelabert Soto, is a sculpture in the shape of Cuba but is broken into many pieces. One interpretation could reflect the still unequal treatment towards artists, and the repression they were under. A movement that mirrored this artistic piece was underway in which the shape of Cuba became a token in the artwork in a phase known as "tokenization". This artwork often combined the shape of the island of Cuba with other attributes of the nation, such as the flag. By combining the various symbols of Cuba the artists were proudly proclaiming 'this is who we are'. Some art critics and historians however will argue that this was partially due to the isolated nature of the island, and that use of the island in artwork represented a feeling of being alone; as with all art, the intention of the artist can have many interpretations.

By the middle of the 1980s, another group of artists sought a more explicit political responsibility to "revive the mess", "revive the confusion", as Aldo Menendez incorporated into his 1988 installation. Accompanying Menéndez's installation was a note: "As you can see, this work is almost blank. I could only start it due to the lack of materials. Please help me." Here is the Cuban humor, the photo, "perhaps the most quintessentially Cuban expression".

Laughter became the antidote of anarchistic energy for and from the revolution; "one moment an aggressive undertow, then a jester's provocation, pressuring the tensions", wrote Rachel Weiss in To and from Utopia in the New Cuban Art. "The photo is allergic to authority and prestige, the enemy of order in all its manifestations…civil disenchantment, the incredulous and mocking inner nature of the Cuban rises to the surface." The photo, doing away with exactitude, tends to depict the extreme limits of an example. This sardonic Cuban humor has become as ubiquitous in Cuban art as the bright Caribbean colors of its palette. Eduardo Ponjuan, Glexis Novoa (of the ABTV group), Carlos Rodriguez Cardenas, Carlos Garaicoa, René Francisco and Enrique Silvestre are exemplars of this sensibility, mixing it with kitsch and harkening back in time while identifying with current Cuban attitudes, liberating art on the eve of the Cuban 'special period', in which the Soviet Union withdrew its financial aid.

In 1990 the Cuban government began programs to stimulate the tourist trade as a means of offsetting the loss of Soviet support. In 1992 the constitution was amended to allow and protect foreign-owned property, and in 1993 the dollar was permitted to circulate legally. In 1994 a cabinet-level department was created, the Ministry of Tourism, to further enhance tourism, which is Cuba's largest source of income. The initial reaction of the artists, as well as the general population, was withdrawal; "Withdrawal from the public to the private…from the collective to the individual…from the epic to the mundane…from satire to metaphor...Withdrawal from controversy…withdrawal from confrontation". But it was the withdrawal from conceptual to figurative art that defined the change in painting. Due in large measure to the interest of tourists, art took on higher-visibility, as well as returning to a more figurative mode of expression. Art also worked as space where Cubans debated some of the social problems magnified by the "Special Period", as illustrated by the Queloides art project, which deals with issues of race and discrimination.

"Every Cuban is an artist and every home is an art gallery," wrote Rachel Weiss in To and from Utopia in the New Cuban Art.

== Political influences in Cuban art ==
"A question of major importance in Cuban culture is the link between radical political and artistic positions…where culture carries a marked social edge attuned to the circumstances in which it is produced and where it is forced to construct a national identity in the face of colonial and neo-colonial powers."

In the 1980s, when the New Cuban Art Movement was consolidating, many still hoped to establish the Third World utopia of social justice promised by the Cuban revolution. While Cuba shares many characteristics with other Latin American countries three factors guarantee it a unique placement amongst the formerly colonized countries of the Americas:

- Spain continued emigration to Cuba in large numbers until the middle of the 20th century
- The native population was eliminated in the 17th century
- Cuba possesses the most varied cultural traditions of all the African diaspora in America

"Although freedom of expression is nonexistent in Cuba, a certain amount of dissonance can be tolerated for recognized artists, at the right time and the right place, which basically means occasionally, in officially sanctioned (and controlled) venues, with very little (if any) spillover in the media. This keeps everybody on his or her toes and creates tension that is useful for the state. The global market seems to like its Cuban art with a dash of political irreverence, though many great works of Cuban artists sold abroad feature no obvious Cuban, Caribbean, or Latin American style or content. Cuban artists are often masters of double entendre and detachment (parody, irony, sarcasm, and pastiche). The regime can afford to appear moderately open-minded since this kind of art is mostly inconsequential on the island. It can be censored when it appears to be crossing the line, perhaps leaving the artist free to present it abroad and to exhibit some other works at home."

== Religious influences in Cuban art ==
In addition to the Christian, predominately Catholic, four African Religions are continuing to influence culture being practiced in Cuba: Santeria (Yoruba), Palo Monte (Kongo), Regla Arara (Ewe Fon), and the secret, male-only, Abakua (Calabar). The African religions operate independently and synthesized with each other and the Christian religions (syncretism). These unique views of reality form a core of practices, beliefs, and customs that have shaped a cultural distinction labeled Afro-Cuban and known as the dominant force in Cuban art; a transracial, "hybridized, inventive, and influential in the construction of contemporary [Cuban] culture".

== See also ==
- List of Cuban artists
