= Cuban Performance Art =

The Cuban Performance Art scene emerged from Havana and its surroundings during the mid-1970s and, particularly, the 1980s. A period in which socially engaged art became a chosen language for the first generation of artists in the aftermath of the Cuban Revolution. Although Cuban Performance Art has been influenced by multiple topics - from theater to politics, religion, and academia - it had an everlasting impact on Cuban society and cultural landscape of the time. Its resonance with Cuban artists and people of Cuban descent has been present from then to now around the United States (the Cuban Americans) and abroad. Live art practices, such as happenings and performances, developed in and alongside art schools on the island and occurred in tandem with new media and conceptual art movements in other parts of the world. Cuban Performance Art is distinct due to the region's political situation, which profoundly affected the arts and culture and the lives of artists. For many artists living in a context under political language, performance art is a creative expression that allows them to communicate and engage with certain topics and ideas.

== Background ==
The National School of Art, Havana, set the stage for the first record known of a Cuban performance art endeavors in 1976. The actions, lasting about fifteen minutes and using nonverbal language, were organized by art students in response to the traditional ethos of the school's academic curriculum. In 1979, an artist-run gallery in Cienfuegos gathered artworks, performance pieces among them, by artists like José Bedia, Leandro Soto, and Rubén Torres Llorca. Artists in the show organized a performance art festival in 1980 at a house in one of Havana's neighborhoods; solely dedicated to performance, the artists Julio García, Rubén Torres Llorca, Gustavo Pérez Monzón and Maria Elena Diarde, José Bedia and Ricardo Rodríguez Brey, Rogelio López Marín (Gory) and Raúl de la Nuez, and José Bedia and Flavio Garciandia. In reaction to the political climate in 1980, nearly 125,000 Cubans departed from the Mariel port to the United States, after Fidel Castro authorized emigration out of the country for the first time in seven years. The Mariel boatlift, a mass migration program, was as part of an agreement between the Cuban government and the Carter administration.

Volume I, a group exhibition at the International Art Center in Old Havana, was the first survey presentation of performance art in a traditional art space in 1981. Regarding reception, the show and its artists attracted large public attention and audience outreach; visitors included the Minister of Culture. Volume I showcased the works of eleven artists, most them deriving from the San Alejandro Academy of Fine Arts and the newly established Instituto Superior de Arte (ISA). In the gallery, a series of printed matter and installation art alluding to previously conceived performance pieces, from photographs and performance documentation to floor drawings and objects used in the original performances. Scholar Gerardo Mosquera served as the curator and author of the exhibition text.

According to curator Francine Birbragher, the word 'performance' started to circulate in Cuba by artists of Cuban descent and other Latin American artists visiting the island in the years after 1981, among them Ana Mendieta and Luis Camnitzer, who were at the time living in the United States and involved in the contemporary art scene and shaping North America's art discourse at the time. Birbragher points to Mendieta's transit between the island and the US, and how her interest in integrating nature and Afro-Cuban rituals in her performance pieces and documentation, such as those staged in Guanabo and Varadero in 1989, had an influential impact on performances being produced on the island - natural elements started to appear in the performance works of artists Juan Francisco Elso Padilla, Ricardo Brey, and Gustavo Pérez Monzón, for instance. Moreover, contemporary artists active now, in and out of the island, maintained their interest in spiritual practices and natural offerings, these elements can be found in performances by Tania Bruguera, for example.

In June 1998, contemporary artists Glexis Novoa and Emilio Pérez curated an exhibition titled Cuban Performance Art of the 80s (chronology) in the InterAmerican Art Gallery at Miami-Dade Community College, Florida. The show featured artists' notes, artworks, and Cuban Performance Art documentation from 1979 to 1989. The exhibition thesis centered on the work of writer Samuel Feijóo, who was influential in bringing international trends, art currents and the circulation of new ideas within the arts in Cuba as an editor of Signos magazine. Feijoo's relevance for the development of performance art in Cuba was confirmed by artist Leandro Soto, an art student at the time, and later in a publication edited by Cuban performance artist, Coco Fusco.

=== Havana Biennial ===
The Museo Nacional de Bellas Artes de La Habana hosted the 2nd Havana Biennial in 1986, which presented the performance work of Manuel Mendive. The work was based on Yoruba ritualistic and dance traditions.

== Influences ==
In the early 1980s, Cuban performance art received the influence of theatrical strategies and incorporated some of its elements, such as written text, artists' collaboration, found objects, and even audience participation. Among themes, responses to Cuba's political regime, the use of nature, Afro-Cuban culture and religious practices such as diasporic Yoruba and Santería representations, gender issues, labor relations, and notions of life and death, among other themes, were and still are integrated in the performance works of these artists.

The Instituto Superior de Arte, Havana, was founded in 1976. Performance art started as a discipline in the school's curriculum in the mid-1980s. Artists and Instituto educators Consuelo Castañeda and Flavio Garciandia, were influential champions, who often included performance art as part of their course instruction. Critics argue that the academic arena and the use of social and political themes expanded the audience for performance art in Cuba and helped the spread of performance and happenings in multidisciplinary events involving music, poetry, dance, and theater. For instance, Consuelo Castañeda and Humberto Castro's intervention in the National Union of Cuban Writers and Artists (UNEAC) in 1986.

== Key artists ==
Performance artists from Cuba or of Cuban descent, gained global recognition by participating in international art biennials, significant solo and group exhibitions worldwide in the past decades. In 2016, however, the group exhibition Ensemble Without Organs (Ensemble sin órganos), a show about performance art, at the Wifredo Lam Centre for Contemporary Art, in Havana, which reunited the performance artworks of over twenty contemporary international artists hailing from fifteen countries which of those, seven were from Cuba. They were Ana Mendieta, Carlos Martiel, Grupo Enema (founded by Lázaro Saavedra and his students at the Instituto Superior de Arte), Héctor Remedios, Leandro Soto Ortiz, Manuel Mendive, and Susana Pilar Delahante Matienzo.

Ana Mendieta left Cuba to the United States in her teenage years, during the Castro regime. Ana Mendieta's prolific performance work, specially her Silueta series (1973-1985), organized around interventions into the landscape, is remembered in relation to ecofeminism, transatlantic histories, and afro-religious rituals.

Carlos Martiel uses his own body and natural elements to comment on social and racial injustices, and political structures. In his work, Martiel often tests the ability and limits of his body to feel pain. He graduated from the National Academy of Fine Arts San Alejandro, and studied under artist Tania Bruguera.

Coco Fusco is an interdisciplinary artist, educator, writer and cultural theorist working on performance, video art, and social practice. Coco Fusco has been a leading voice in the Americas working at the intersection of feminism, politics, and identity. A monograph publication was selected One of the Best Art Books of 2023.

Consuelo Castañeda graduated from the San Alejandro Academy and taught at the Instituto Superior de Arte, Havana. After living in Mexico City and later in Miami from the 1990s to the 200s, Consuelo Castañeda moved back to Cuba in 2016. In the 1980s Cuba, she was an active member of artists collective Equipo Hexágono (or Hexágono Equipo de Creación Colectiva) alongside artists Humberto Castro, Sebastián Elizondo, Antonio Eligio Fernández (TONEL), Abigail García and María Elena Morera.

Glexis Novoa investigates different systems of power such as religious, political, ideological and financial, and has been involved in performance art since the 1980s. Based in Miami, FL, and an active community member and champion for the local arts landscape, he has maintained a consistent artistic practice.

María Magdalena Campos-Pons work draws from transatlantic histories, labor relations familiar histories, and gender, using a myriad of artistic languages. In her performance work, she employs spiritual practices and centers on Yoruba and Santería rites. María Magdalena Campos-Pons is a Professor of Art and Cornelius Vanderbilt Chair of Fine Arts at the Vanderbilt University.

Tania Bruguera is a senior lecturer in Media & Performance, Theater, Dance & Media at Harvard University. She is the founder of Cátedra Arte de Conducta (Behavior Art School), and her work seeks to question society's political and institutional structures while creating social and educational interventions.

Susana Pilar Delahante Matienzo . Matienzo had a solo show and presented a performance incorporating Artificial Intelligence generated images at Vienna's Secession building in 2024.
