= Ricardo Brey =

Cuban installation artist, contemporary

Ricardo Rodríguez Brey
- Born: November 9, 1955 (age 69); Havana, Cuba
- Website: www.ricardobrey.com

Ricardo Rodríguez Brey (born November 9, 1955) is a Cuban conceptual artist, sculptor, installation artist and draftsman.

== Education ==
From 1970 to 1974, Brey attended La Escuela de Artes Plásticas San Alejandro. In 1974, Brey enrolled at La Escuela Nacional de Arte, a prestigious art school in Havana focused on craft and developing the technical skills of the profession.

== 1977–1981: early career ==
In 1977, Brey collaborated with Volumen I, a group of young artists committed to artistic experimentation in Cuba, opposed to the socialist-realism artistic mandates of the Cuban Revolution. The group organized itself as a discussion forum for community-building among young Cuban artists.

During this period, Brey produced works on paper referencing late-18th-century Spanish painting traditions, stylistically utilizing frottage and collage as methodologies in his drawings. Brey also worked as an educator at Casa de la Cultura, Jaruco, with fellow artist Gustavo Pérez Monzon leading outdoor drawing workshops for the institution's visitors, which primarily consisted of children and the elderly. At this time, Brey began to explore the writings of anthropologist Claude Lévi-Strauss, whose theories on the formations of culture influenced Brey for years to come.

In 1981, Brey organized the landmark Volumen I exhibition at the Centro de Arte Internacional, Havana, along with fellow artists José Bedia, Juan Francisco Elso, José Manuel Fors, Flavio Garciandía, Israel León, Rogelio López Marín, Gustavo Pérez Monzón, Tomás Sánchez, Leandro Soto, and Rubén Torres Llorca. In two weeks, the exhibition drew over 8,000 visitors and ushered in a new era of conceptual art in Cuba, referred to as the "Cuban Renaissance."

== 1982–1989: travels and developments ==
At the invitation of Luis Camnitzer, Brey traveled to the United States for the first time in 1985 to be an artist-in-residence at SUNY Old Westbury. The same year he exhibited The Structure of Myths, an early installation work combining recreations of Giovanni da Verrazzano's logbooks with traditional Santería offerings at SUNY's Amelie A. Wallace Gallery. Also in 1985, Brey traveled to Native American reservations in South Dakota, a trip organized by Jimmie Durham. Brey spent a month with the Lakota indigenous community. Brey then visited and lived in Mexico City for 11 months from 1986 to 1987. During this time, he produced a series of stenciled and illustrated drawings based on natural elements.

== 1990–present ==
In 1990, Brey was invited by Belgian curator Jan Hoet to participate in the exhibition Ponton Temse in Belgium. He temporarily moved to Belgium to prepare for his inclusion in the exhibition. At this time, he dropped "Rodriguez" from his surname to honor his mother's memory, and continues to use the name "Ricardo Brey." The following year, following a brief return to Cuba, Brey permanently settled in Ghent, Belgium.

Brey was also included by Jan Hoet in Documenta IX in Kassel, (Germany), where he produced a large-scale installation. Incorporating materials like Coca-Cola, glass panes, tattered window blinds, soiled pillows, and strewn feathers, this work evoked a sensation of disaster and was conceptually in line with the principles of multiculturalism of the time. Hybrid ambiguity became a catalyzing force in Brey's practice.

Brey began to experiment with small-scale drawings of natural flora and fauna. Produced over 1,000 drawings over a period of six months and titled the series Universe. As Brey describes, "That is how "Universe" (2002–2006) came about. I wasn't creating the universe, just my universe, with all my anxieties, my dreams, my leitmotifs. All the techniques I’ve used, and even some I invented at the time, were in the drawings."

In 2009, Brey began his series Every Life is a Fire, consisting of archival boxes that unfold to reveal books, drawings, sculptures, and performative proposals. Brey points out "The project with the boxes, Every life is a fire, is my most metaphysical work, and it came to me as an obligatory answer to the beauty and the consideration of the small space."

Brey was included in All The World’s Futures, the 56th Venice Biennale, curated by Okwui Enwezor in 2015.

In 2019, Brey's work will be exhibited in solo exhibition in Museum de Domijnen, Sittard, Netherlands and Gerhard-Marcks-Haus, Bremen, Germany.

== Personal life ==
Brey lives and works in Ghent, Belgium and is represented by Alexander Gray Associates in New York.

== Representation in public collections ==
- Bouwfonds Art Collection, Tha Hague, the Netherlands
- Centro de Arte Contemporáneo Wilfredo Lam, Havana, Cuba
- Collection de la Province de Hainaut, Belgium
- Conscience Building, Ministry of the Flemish Community, Brussels, Belgium
- Fonds national d'art contemporain (FNAC), France
- Lenbachhaus Museum, Munich, Germany
- Mondrian Foundation, Amsterdam, the Netherlands
- Museo Nacional de Bellas Artes de La Habana, Havana, Cuba
- Museum de Domijnen, Sittard, the Netherlands
- Museum van Hedendaagse Kunst Antwerpen (MHKA), Antwerp, Belgium
- Nova Southern University (NSU) Art Museum, Fort Lauderdale, FL
- Province of East Flanders Monuments and Cultural Heritage, Belgium
- Sindika Dokolo Foundation, Luanda, Angola
- Stedelijk Museum voor Actuele Kunst (SMAK), Ghent, Belgium
- Suermondt-Ludwig Museum, Aachen, Germany
- Watari Museum of Contemporary Art, Tokyo, Japan

== Awards and recognition ==
- 1997 Guggenheim Fellowship for Sculpture and Installation
- 1998 Prize from the Flemish Ministry of Culture
