= Kcho =

Cuban artist

KCHO
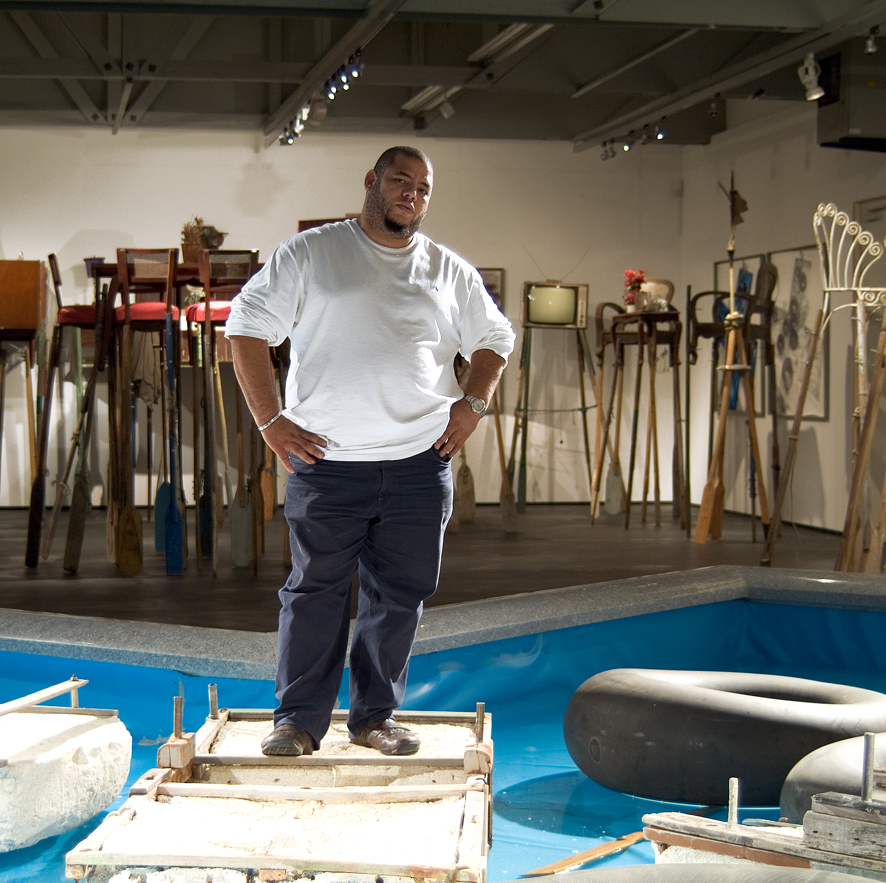
- Born: Alexis Leiva Machado; February 12, 1970 (age 56); Nueva Gerona, Isla de la Juventud, Cuba
- Education: National School of Plastic Arts (ENA), Havana
- Known for: Installation art, sculpture, painting, drawing
- Website: www.kchostudio.com

Alexis Leiva Machado (1970), known as KCHO (sometimes spelled K'cho) is a Cuban artist. He was the winner of the grand prize at South Korea's Gwangju Biennale in 1995.

== Early life and education ==
Alexis Leiva Machado (KCHO) was born in Nueva Gerona, Isla de la Juventud (Isle of Pines), on February 12, 1970. His father, Ignacio de Loyola Leiva Abreu, was a carpenter and telecommunication technician, and his mother, Martina Primitiva Machado Cuní (better known as Martha Camacho) was a famous artist. He grew up alongside his four sisters.

KCHO attended Josué País primary school and Manuel Alcolea primary school. He then attended Elementary Art School Leonardo Liberta in Isla de la Juventud.

In 1986, KCHO enrolled in the National School of Plastic Arts (ENA) in Havana and graduated in 1990, specializing in painting and sculpture. In 1986, he had a solo exhibition "Kcho Expone Favelas" at the Centre of Plastic Arts in Nueva Gerona. One of KCHO's works from his graduation thesis Paisaje Popular Cubano (Cuban Popular Landscape) (1990) was selected for the permanent collection displayed at the Fine Arts Museum of Cuba (MNBA).

== Work ==
KCHO has gained a knowledge of a range of engraving techniques. His interest in this area made him create or restore a series of Engraving Workshops all along Cuba, which facilitated the creative work of artists and students specialised in this branch of the plastic arts in the country.

=== Brigade "Martha Machado" ===
In 2008, Cuba was hit by hurricanes Gustav, Ike and Paloma, all of which severely affected the country and its socioeconomic infrastructure. Isla de la Juventud suffered heavy damage from Gustav and Ike, and required immediate help.

Founded on September 6, 2008, the group, Brigade "Martha Machado" (including KCHO) organised for more than 500 artists and friends (national and international painters, actors, musicians, dancers, circus performers, and stilt walkers) to leave their jobs and lives to live in tents across 13 camps in Cuba, whilst working in the communities providing painting workshops, music and dance to encourage creativity and educate children and teens who could not attend school because the facilities had been partially destroyed.

In March 2010, members of Brigade "Martha Machado" travelled to Haiti after it had been hit by an earthquake on January 12, 2010, seriously affecting the Caribbean's infrastructure. The group travelled over four thousand kilometres from their base in Port-au-Prince across the country. From the outset, their work placed particular emphasis on children, knowing that they are the most affected by the disaster, and this would have an impact on the future of the country.

Back in Cuba, KCHO travelled to the Isla de la Juventud and continued to organise and develop the Isla de la Juventud Days Mine with the brigade.

In 2008, as a creator of Brigade "Martha Machado", KCHO received (alongside other members), the Flag Feat Labor from the CTC. In 2010, they also received the Commemorative Medal for the Bicentennial of the Republic of Haiti.

KCHO saw this work as significant, and is still working on continuing Brigade "Martha Machado"'s work.

== Career ==
=== 1990s ===
Beyond his studies, KCHO began displaying works in individual and group exhibitions from 1990 onwards.

In 1991, KCHO had his first solo exhibition at the MNBA, as part of their "Artist of the Month" series.

In 1994, KCHO won a scholarship to the Ludwig Foundation for art studies in Aachen, Germany. He was also invited to participate in the 22nd Biennial in São Paulo, Brazil by curator Nelson Aguilar.

In 1995, KCHO participated in the 1st Kwang-Ju Biennial, Korea, where his work won the Grand Prix. By the end of the year, KCHO had met Barbara Gladstone, owner of the Barbara Gladstone Gallery in New York, in Havana. Together, they organised two exhibitions of KCHO's work.

In 1997, KCHO held his show Todo cambia (Everything Changes), organised by Chief Curator Paul Schimmel and Assistant Curator, Alma Ruiz, for the Museum of Contemporary Art (MOCA) in Los Angeles, California. KCHO could not go to the opening himself because the government of the United States refused his entry visa.

In 1999, KCHO was admitted into the Atelier Calder Residence in Saché, France, after receiving the prize granted by the Calder Foundation and the Ministry of Culture of France. The award allowed him to live and work at the Calder studio with a grant to support the production and promotion of his artwork. The residency ended with an exhibition of his work titled Klder. C.C.C.

=== 2000s ===
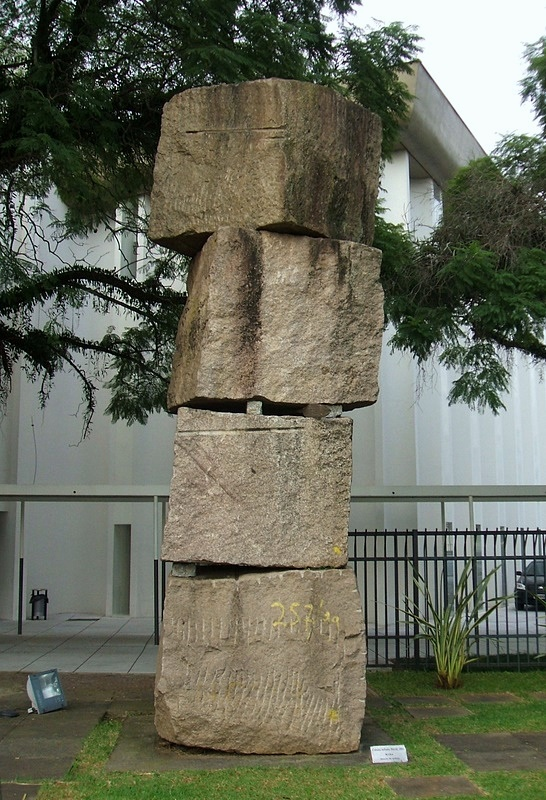
Coluna infinita (2002). Sculpture by Kcho at the Brazilian Museum of Sculpture, São Paulo.

In 2001, KCHO was part of the travelling exhibition Suite Europa 2001, carried out by the Dirección General de la Secretaría de Estado para la Cooperación Internacional y para Iberoamérica (General Management of the State Department for International Cooperation and Latin America) organised by the Ministry of Foreign Affairs in Madrid, Spain.

In 2003, KCHO collaborated with Cuban singer-songwriter Santiago Feliú using the work Para olvidar as scenery for his concert at the National Theatre of Cuba.

In the early 2000s, KCHO was working more in Cuba, not only in Havana but also in Isla de la Juventud and Matanzas.

In July 2003, KCHO was elected deputy of the Popular Power National Assemblyto represent the people of the Isla de la Juventud and he was reelected in January 2008.

In 2006, KCHO moved to Barcelona for several months to work in a group of choreographies at the workshops of Poligrafa, Spain. There, he prepared his exhibition Paso de Los Vientos (Windward Passage), shown later at the Joan Prats Gallery in Barcelona. He returned to Cuba to create his installation-performance Vive y Deja Vivir (Live and Let Live) for the 9th Biennial of Havana.

Also in 2006, he was invited by the Marlborough Gallery to go to Madrid for the opening of the Chilean artist Claudio Bravo's exhibition. There, he was invited to be part of a group of artists to exhibit at the gallery and its venues in Monte Carlo, Santiago de Chile, Barcelona, Madrid, New York and London. In 2007, he held his first solo exhibition with the Marlborough Gallery called Retrasando lo inevitable (Delaying the Inevitable) at its venue in Madrid, and also participated in other group exhibitions with the gallery. In February 2008, KCHO held the exhibition Cadena de reunificación familiar (Family Reunification Chain) at the Marlborough Gallery in New York, showing work on the theme of migration.

On 3 June 2006, KCHO donated his private collection of Cuban art to the Museo Municipal de la Isla de la Juventud, where his Studio built a Cuban Art Exhibition Hall to contribute to the study and knowledge of national painting. The collection amounts to a total of 52 works by fifteen of the most important Cuban artists, including: Vicente Escobar, Leopoldo Romañanch, Antonio Rodríguez Morey, Eduardo Abela Villareal, Domingo Ramos, Fidelio Ponce de León, Amelia Peláez, Wifredo Lam, Marcelo Pogolotti, Luis Martínez Pedro, René Portocarrero, Mariano Rodríguez, Servando Cabrera, Raúl Martínez, and Antonia Eiriz.

In 2009, KCHO's work focused on the issues of life, man, customs and culture.

In 2009, KCHO received an invitation from Leonor Amarantes to participate in the V Latin American Biennial of Visual Arts in Curitiba, Brazil. For this, he created a large installation, making the classroom of a school and all its property into a great "Archipelago in motion". This work was part of KCHO's Nuclei of Time series.

In March 2009, KCHO participated in the Tenth Havana Biennial. He installed Core Time in the contemporary Cuban art exhibit in the exhibition room Pabexpo B, which also presented works by Luis Gomez, Rene Francisco, Sandra Ramos and The Carpenters among others. KCHO also organised the exhibition Meeting Point in the Convent of St. Francis of Assisi in Havana, where he included several of his works as a carousel that appeared from darkness. Whilst there, he met people including Cai Guo-Qiang (China), Peter Nadin (USA), Patrick Tuttofuoco (Italy), Jane Alexander (South Africa), Tatsuo Miyajima (Japan), AES + F (Russia), Mariana Bunimov (Venezuela), and Patricia Gerber Jallageas Flaminio (Brazil), Shirin Neshat and Shoja Azari (Iran-US), Tomas Sanchez, Edgar Hechavarría, Luis Gomez and Yoan Capote (Cuba).

=== 2010s ===
In early 2011, KCHO moved to Europe to participate in two solo exhibitions he organised with the Marlborough Gallery.

== Awards ==
- 1991 – Prize – National Group of Art Schools' Teachers at the Centre of Plastic Arts and Design
- 1995 – Grand Prix – Kwang-Ju Biennial
- 1995 – Prize for the Promotion of Arts – UNESCO
- 1998 – "National Culture", Ministry of Culture
- 2001 – Prize for Cuban Delivery – 4th Caribbean Biennial at the Museum of Modern Art in Santo Domingo, Dominican Republic
- 2003 – Medal "Abel Santamaria" awarded by the State Council on the proposal of the Young Communists (UJC) and the Replica of the Machete of Maximo Gomez
- 2008 – Order "Julio Antonio Mella", issued by the State Council, proposed by the National UJC
- 2011 – Stamp commemorating the Central de Trabajadores de Cuba (CTC) on the 70th anniversary of its founding.

== Exhibitions ==
=== Solo ===
| Year | Title | Institution | Location | Notes | Ref |
|---|---|---|---|---|---|
| 1991 | Artist of the Month | MNBA | | | |
| 1995 | Kcho at the Pilar | Joan Miró Foundation | Majorca | | |
| 1996 | Kcho | | | | |
| 1997 | Todo cambia (Everything Changes) | Museum of Contemporary Art (MOCA) | Los Angeles, California | | |
| | Kcho, Proyectos recientes (Kcho, Recent Projects) | Regen Projects Gallery | Los Angeles, California | | |
| 1997 | Speaking of the Obvious Was Never a Pleasure for Us | Israel Museum, Billy Rose Pavilion | Jerusalem | | |
| 1998 | Archipiélago de mi pensamiento, Serie Americana, I Kcho | Galerie Nationale du Jeu De Paume | Paris, France | Curated by Daniel Abadie | |
| 1998 | Largo Viaje (Long Journey) | GAN Gallery | Tokyo, Japan | | |
| 1999 | Klder. C.C.C | | Saché, France | Part of Atelier Calder Residency | |
| 2000 | No me agradezcan el silencio (Don't Thank Me for the Silence) | Casa de las Américas | Havana, Cuba | | |
| 2000 | La columna infinita (The Infinite Column) | National Museum Reina Sofia | Madrid, Spain | | |
| 2000 | Kcho. Dibujos (Kcho. Drawings) | Barbara Gladstone Gallery | New York, USA | | |
| 2001 | | | Havana, Cuba | Showed 25 Piedras (25 Stones), lithographs | |
| 2001 | En el mar no hay nada escrito (There Is Nothing Written on the Sea) | Martha Machado Gallery | Isla de la Juventud | | |
| 2002 | La Jungla | Civic Gallery of Modern and Contemporary Art | Turin, Italy | | |
| 2002 | Los peligros del Olvido (Perils of Oblivion) | Gabriela Mistral Gallery | Santiago de Chile | | |
| 2002 | El Huracán (Hurricane) | Museum of Sculpture | São Paulo, Brazil | | |
| 2002 | Artíssima 2002 | Joan Guaita Art Gallery | Palma de Mallorca, Spain | | |
| 2002 | Kcho, el Hijo de Martha (Kcho, Son of Martha) | José Martí Memorial | Havana, Cuba | | |
| 2002 | Archipiélago (Archipelago) | | Maracaibo, Venezuela | | |
| 2004 | Kcho, viajero inmóvil (Kcho, Still Traveller) | Louis Carré Gallery | Paris, France | Curated by Daniel Abadie | |
| 2004 | Kcho, un hombre de isla (Kcho, an islander) | | Houston, Texas; | | |
| 2004 | Los animales (Animals) | Galería Habana | Cuba | | |
| 2004 | Kcho – Casa 5 – Las playas infinitas (Kcho – House 5 – Infinite Beaches) | Atteresse Kusnt | Salzburg, Austria | | |
| 2006 | Paso de Los Vientos (Windward Passage) | Joan Prats Gallery | Barcelona | | |
| | La nave de Kcho (Kcho's Ship) | Castillo de Santa Bárbara (Castle of Saint Barbara), Patronato Municipal de Alicante | Alicante | Curated by Pablo Rico from the Joan Miró Foundation | |
| 2007 | Retrasando lo inevitable (Delaying the Inevitable) | Marlborough Gallery | Madrid | | |
| 2007 | El Viaje (Journey) | Museum of Contemporary Art | Panama | | |
| 2007 | El Cuadernos del hombre de Los pies de Barro (Notebook of the Man with Mud Feet) | Gallery | Maracaibo, Venezuela | | |
| 2008 | Cadena de reunificación familiar (Family Reunification Chain) | Marlborough Gallery | New York | | |

=== Group ===
| Year | Title | Institution | Location | Notes | Ref |
|---|---|---|---|---|---|
| 1991 | Proyectos Recientes (Recent Projects) | Arts Centre 23 y 12 | Havana, Cuba | With Alejandro Aguilera, Ángel Ricardo Ríos, and Osvaldo Yero | |
| 1991 | Los Hijos de Guillermo Tell (The Sons of William Tell) | Museum Alejandro Otero | Caracas, Venezuela | Youngest artist to be invited | |
| 1991 | Los Hijos de Guillermo Tell (The Sons of William Tell) | Library Luis Ángel Arango | Bogotá Colombia | Youngest artist to be invited | |
| 1992 | Vont Dort Aus: Kuba | Forum Ludwig | Aachen, Germany | Coordinated by Robert Littman for the Cultural Centre of Contemporary Art from the Cultural Foundation Televisa in Mexico City | |
| 1992 | Vont Dort Aus: Kuba | Arte Cubano Actual (Current Cuban Art) | | Coordinated by Robert Littman for the Cultural Centre of Contemporary Art from the Cultural Foundation Televisa in Mexico City | |
| 1992 | 1st Biennial of Barro de América (Clay of America) | Museum of Contemporary Art Sofía Imber | Caracas, Venezuela | Curated by Roberto Guevara. With Ana Mendieta, Rimel Cardillo, Milton Becerra and others. | |
| 1992 | La Década Prodigiosa (The Prodigious Decade) | Museo Universitario del Chopo | Mexico City | Cuban plastic arts from the 80s | |
| 1992 | La Ronda Cubana (The Cuban Round) | Van Reekum Museum in Apeldoorn | Netherlands | | |
| 1994 | Cocido y Crudo (Cooked and Raw) | Museum Reina Sofia | Madrid | Invited by Dan Cameron. | |
| 1994 | La Otra Orilla (The Other Shore) | Fifth Biennial of Havana, Castillo de Los Tres Reyes del Morro | Havana | Invited by Yiliam Yanes Godoy. Displayed his work La Regata. | |
| 1994 | 22nd Biennial of São Paulo | | São Paulo | | |
| 1995 | | Kwang-Ju Biennial | | | |
| 1995 | El Camino de la nostalgia (The road of nostalgia) | Centre Wifredo Lam | Havana | | |
| 1995 | Tabla de salvación (Salvation) | Espacio Abierto Gallery | Havana | | |
| 1995 | Cocido y Crudo | Museum Reina Sofía | Sofia, Spain | | |
| 1995 | Arte nuevo de Cuba (New Art from Cuba) | Whitechapel Art Galler | London | Curated by Katherine Lampert | |
| 1995 | Campo (Countryside) | | | Curated by Francesco Bonami | |
| 1995 | Opening | Sandretto-Re Rebaudengo Foundation for the Arts | Turin, Italy | | |
| 1995 | Nuestro Siglo (Our Century) | Ludwig Museum | Cologne, Germany | | |
| 1995 | Diálogos de Paz (Peace Dialogues) | United Nations Headquarters | Geneva, Switzerland | | |
| 1995 | La Habana – São Paulo | Centre for Cultures of the World | Berlin, Germany | Grouped a sample of biennials from Cuba and Brazil | |
| 1995 | 1st Johannesburg Biennial | | South Africa | | |
| 1995 | 4th Istanbul Biennial | | Turkey | | |
| 1996 | | Studio Guenzani | Italy | Extended an invitation to the young Italian artist Giuseppe Gabellone | |
| 1996 | Para olvidar (To Forget) | International Center of Contemporary Art | Montreal, Canada | | |
| 1996 | Cuba Siglo XX. Modernidad y sincretismo (Cuba the 20th Century. Modernity and Syncretism) | Centro Atlántico de Arte Moderno | Las Palmas de Gran Canaria | | |
| 1996 | Cuba Siglo XX. Modernidad y sincretismo (Cuba the 20th Century. Modernity and Syncretism) | | La Caixa | | |
| 1996 | Cuba Siglo XX. Modernidad y sincretismo (Cuba the 20th Century. Modernity and Syncretism) | | Palma de Mallorca | | |
| 1996 | Cuba Siglo XX. Modernidad y sincretismo (Cuba the 20th Century. Modernity and Syncretism) | Centre d'Arte Santa Mónica | Barcelona | | |
| 1996 | Cuba Siglo XX. Modernidad y sincretismo (Cuba the 20th Century. Modernity and Syncretism) | Kunsthalle Bielefeld | Germany | | |
| 1996 | De Rode Poort | Museum van Hedendaagse Kunst | Ghent | Invited by curator Jan Hoet | |
| 1996 | Arte a través de Los océanos (Art through the Oceans) | Container 96 | Copenhagen | | |
| 1996 | No Place Like Home | Walker Art Center | Minneapolis | Curated by Richard Flood | |
| 1996 | TRUCE: Ecos del Arte en la Edad de las conclusiones infinitas (TRUCE: Echoes of art at the age of infinite conclusions) | | Santa Fe | Curated by Francesco Bonami | |
| 1997 | Utopian Territories, New Art from Cuba | Morris and Helen Belkin Art Gallery, University of British Columbia | | | |
| 1997 | Utopian Territories, New Art from Cuba | Contemporary Art Gallery | Vancouver | | |
| 1997 | Utopian Territories, New Art from Cuba | Contemporary Art Gallery | Canada | | |
| 1997 | Trash | Museo d'Arte Moderna e Contemporanea di Trento e Rovereto | Italy | | |
| 1997 | Así está la Cosa: instalación y arte objeto en América Latina (That's How Things Are: installations and Object Art in Latin America) | Cultural Centre of Contemporary Art in Mexico | | | |
| 1997 | 6th Biennial of Havana | | San Carlos de La Cabaña | Exhibited Archipiélago de mi pensamiento (Archipelago in My Mind) from the series Columna infinita (Infinite Column) | |
| 1998 | Arco | | Madrid | | |
| 1998 | Dark Art | | Senegal | | |
| 1998 | 3rd Biennial of Barro de América | | | | |
| 1998 | Feria Iberoamericana de Arte | | Venezuela | | |
| 1998 | Cada día (Every Day) | | | | |
| 1998 | 11th Sydney Biennial | | Sydney | | |
| 1998 | Expoarte | | Guadalajara, Mexico | | |
| 1998 | Visión global del nuevo Arte de Los Noventa (Global View of the New Art of the Nineties) | Deste Foundation | Athens, Greece | | |
| 1998 | +Zone | Palazzo Re Rebaudengo | Guarene d'Alba, Italy | | |
| 1999 | Los Campos de la escultura (Fields of Sculpture) | | Elysian Fields, Paris | Featured his work Para olvidar el miedo (To Forget the Fear) | |
| 1999 | Encuentros: Kcho and Nauman Kcho and Nauman (Encounters: Kcho and Nauman) | Museum of Contemporary Art in Chicago | USA | Curated by Francesco Bonami. Joint exhibition with Bruce Nauman | |
| 2001 | Diez Grabadores Cubanos (Ten Cuban Engravers) | Fundación Provincial de Artes Plásticas Rafael Botí (Provincial Foundation of Plastic Arts Rafael Botí) | Spain | | |
| 2001 | | National Museum of Fine Arts | Havana, Cuba | Exhibited La Jungla | |
| 2001 | Contemporary Art in Cuba: Irony and Survival in the Island of Utopia | Spencer Museum of Art of the University of Kansas | USA | | |
| 2001 | Estructuras Similares a Los Ojos de la Historia (Similar Structures in the Eyes of History) | Tent Centrum Belldende Kunst | Rotterdam | | |
| 2001 | 1st Valencia Biennial | | Valencia | Curated by Aquiles Bonito Oliva | |
| 2001 | Arco 2001 | | Madrid | | |
| 2001 | Para Olvidar | Shiseido Gallery | Tokyo | With Kenji Yanobe | |
| 2001 | Suite Europa 2001 | | | | |
| 2002 | Islas imaginaries (Imaginary Islands) | Museum of Contemporary Art | Zulia, Venezuela | | |
| 2003 | | 8th Biennial of Havana | Havana | Showed his work Archipiélago in his studio. Also shared his performance Pocas Palabras (Few Words). | |
| 2004 | Art Fair | | Chicago | Invited by Galería Habana de Cuba. Showed La conversación (Conversation). | |
| 2004 | | Villa Manuela Gallery | Havana | Exhibited part of Núcleos del Tiempo (Time Nucleuses) | |
| 2004 | La Jungla, Openasia | | Venice | | |
| 2004 | Obra gráfica original. Artistas contemporáneos Internacionales (Original Graphic Work. International Contemporary Artists) | | Miami Beach | | |
| 2004 | Latin American and Caribbean Art | Museo del Barrio | New York | | |
| 2004 | Art Miami | | Miami | | |
| 2004 | Fair of the Americas | | Miami | | |
| 2004 | Fair Arco | | Madrid | With the Joan Guaita Gallery. Showed Autorretrato (Self-portrait). | |
| 2004 | Nueve pintores contemporáneos Cubanos (Nine Cuban Contemporary Painters) | Exhibition Hall, Quay Anthony I | Monaco | | |
| 2006 | 9th Biennial of Havana | Plaza Vieja and in La Casona Gallery | Havana | Showing Vive y Deja Vivir (Live and Let Live) | |
| 2006 | Llegó el Cubano (The Cuban Has Arrived) | Alonso Garcés Gallery | Bogotá, Colombia | Invited by ex-president and art collector César Gaviria | |
| 2006 | Art Miami | | Miami | | |
| 2006 | Fair Arco | | Madrid | | |
| 2006 | Fair Arco | Louis Carré et. Cie. gallery | Paris | | |
| 2007 | Exhibición de Verano (Summer Exhibition) | Marlborough Gallery | Madrid | | |
| 2007 | Exhibición de Verano (Summer Exhibition) | Marlborough Gallery | New York | | |
| 2007 | Fair Arco | | Madrid | | |
| 2007 | Art Miami | | Miami | | |
| 2007 | Cuba Avant-Garde: Contemporary Cuban Art from the Farber Collection | University of Florida | Florida | | |
| 2007 | Homing Devices | Museum of Contemporary Art, University of South Florida | Florida | | |
| 2007 | Ojos de Mar (Sea Eyes) | Institute of Modern Art | Valencia, Spain | | |
| 2007 | 1st Biennial Fin del Mundo (End of the World) | | Ushuaia, Argentina | Showed Señores de la playa (Beach Lords). Curated by Leonor Amarante | |
| 2008 | Cartografías de Ultramar (Cartographies from Overseas) | National Museum of Fine Arts | Havana | | |
| 2008 | El Futuro del futurismo (The Future of Futurism) | Gallery of Modern and Contemporary Art | Bergamo, Italy | | |
| 2008 | ¡Cuba! Los Artistas experimental en su país (Cuba! Artists Experiment in Their Country) | Hunterdon Art Museum | New Jersey | | |
| 2008 | Summer Exhibition and Latin American Art | Marlborough Gallery | New York | | |
| 2008 | Visiones, Centuria de Arte Latinoamericano (Visions, a Century of Latin American Art) | Art Museum Boca Ratón | Florida | | |
| 2008 | Sin ruptures: Diálogos en el Arte Cubano (No Ruptures: Dialogues in Cuban Art) | | Fort Lauderdale, Florida | | |
| 2008 | NeoHooDoo: Art for a Forgotten Faith | | Houston, Texas | | |
| 2008 | A Wake-up Call: Cuban Contemporary Art | Tresart, Coral Gables, | Florida | | |
| 2009 | V Latin American Biennial of Visual Arts | | Curitiba, Brazil | | |
| 2009 | 10th Havana Biennial | | Havana | | |
| 2009 | I have a Dream | Carriage House Center for the Arts | New York | | |
| 2009 | Ten contemporary artists | | Granada | | |
| 2009 | Summer Exhibition | Marlborough Gallery | Madrid | | |
| 2009 | Exhibition of sculptures | Marlborough Gallery | New York | | |
| 2010 | Biennale Cuvée | OK Center | Linz, Austria | | |
| | 40th anniversary of Live and Let Live in | Central Park | | | |
| | Line and L | | Havana | | |
| 2011 | Recent Works (Oeuvres recentes) | Marlborough Gallery | Monaco | | |
| | Night View | Marlborough Gallery | Barcelona | | |
| | Monument end, 54th Venice Biennale | Palace Grimani | | Curated by Vittorio Sgarbi and Luciano Caprile, with Tega Gallery | |

== Collections ==
KCHO has several works in collections including:

- La Regata – Ludwig Museum, Cologne, Germany
- Columna Infinita # 1 (Infinite Column # 1) and A Los Ojos de la history (In the Eyes of History) (1995), Museum of Modern Art (MOMA), New York
- Exhibited Archipiélago de mi pensamiento (Archipelago in My Mind), private collection, Italy
- MOMA collection at the Museo del Barrio

== Commercial use of works ==
KCHO's work La Regata appears on the cover of Revolución y Cultura magazine (issue No. 5, 1994) and in Artnews, June 2000.

In 1996, KCHO's installation Obras escogidas (Selected Works) appeared on the cover of Flash Art magazine, May/June issue.

== Commentary ==
- Alfred Weidinger: KCHO - Casa 5 - Las Playas Infinitas. Edition Anteros, Vienna 2005, ISBN 3-85340-017-5
