= KCHO =

Kcho or KCHO may refer to:

- Kcho, Cuban artist
- Kʼchò language, a language of Myanmar
- KCHO (FM), a radio station (91.7 FM) licensed to Chico, California, United States
- Charlottesville–Albemarle Airport, Virginia, United States (by ICAO code)
