= Arnaldo Larrinaga =

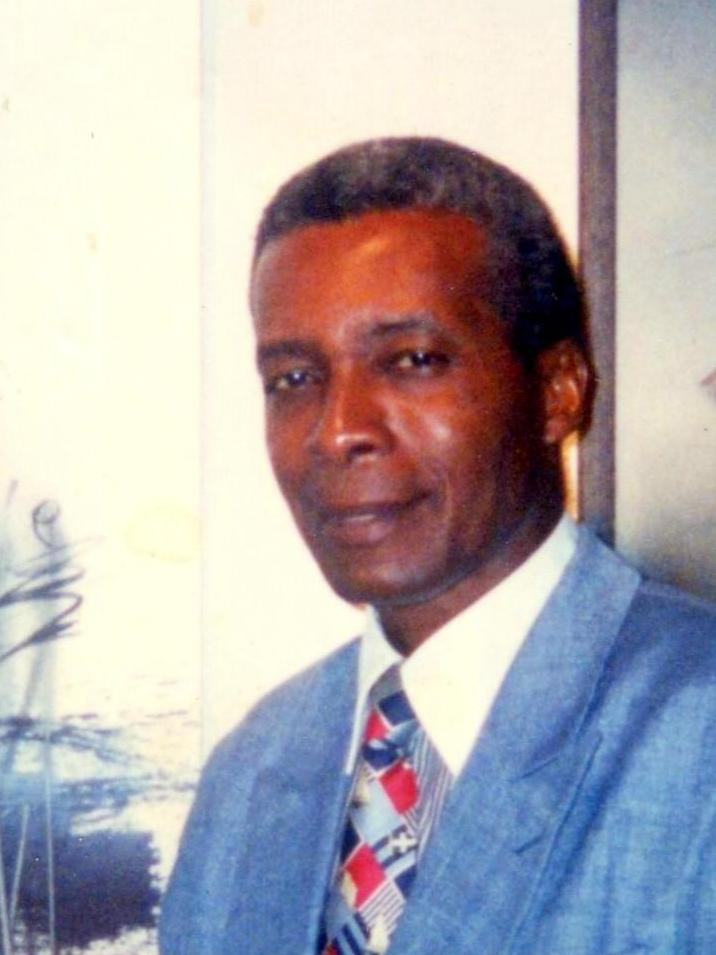
- Born: Arnaldo Rodríguez Larrinaga; 1948 (age 77–78); Havana, Cuba
- Known for: Painting, drawing, printmaking
- Movement: Grupo Antillano

Arnaldo Rodríguez Larrinaga (born 1948 in Havana) is a Cuban visual artist known for painting, drawing, and printmaking. He was a member of Grupo Antillano, a Cuban artists’ collective that emphasized African and Caribbean cultural traditions within Cuban art.

== Career and Grupo Antillano ==
Larrinaga was among the core members of Grupo Antillano by 1979. Contemporary documentation from Cuba also names Arnaldo Rodríguez Larrinaga among the artists in the group. The collective developed an artistic approach concerned with the African diaspora in Cuba and the Caribbean and challenged more Eurocentric currents in contemporary Cuban art.

The group and Larrinaga's work were later revisited in Drapetomanía: Grupo Antillano and the Art of Afro-Cuba, curated by Harvard historian Alejandro de la Fuente. The exhibition was organized in collaboration with Harvard University's Afro-Latin American Research Institute and included Larrinaga among the Grupo Antillano artists represented.

== Work ==
Larrinaga's art incorporates Cuban mythology, nature, and Afro-Cuban cultural imagery. A review of Drapetomanía in Cuba Encuentro discusses his painting Güije de la noche, noting its combination of mythological creatures, palms, birds, the Cuban güije, and imagery associated with the Abakuá tradition.

His printmaking was represented in AfroCuba: Works on Paper, 1968–2003. The official exhibition checklist documents two screenprints by Larrinaga: Güijes #1 (1997) and Güijes #3 (1998). Both were presented in the exhibition's Grupo Antillano section.

A contemporary review of AfroCuba also discussed Larrinaga individually, describing his screenprint Guijes and commenting on its composition and visual style.

== Later recognition ==
The revival of interest in Grupo Antillano during the 2010s brought Larrinaga's work into exhibitions and scholarship reconsidering the role of Afro-Cuban artists in modern Cuban art. His membership in the group is also documented in later academic scholarship on African and Caribbean influences in Cuban visual culture.
