= Esteban Ayala Ferrer =

Esteban Ayala
- Born: September 2, 1929; Havana, Cuba
- Died: July 15, 1995; Havana, Cuba

Esteban Guillermo Ayala Ferrer (September 2, 1929 in Havana, Cuba - July 15, 1995 in Havana, Cuba) was a Cuban painter and a member of the Grupo Antillano.

He studied in evening courses at the Escuela de Círculo de Bellas Artes attached to the Escuela Nacional de Bellas Artes "San Alejandro" in Havana. He studied advertising at the Professional Advertising School between 1954 and 1957, and went on to take classes at the Massachusetts Institute of Technology between 1956 and 1958 and at the Hochschule für Grafik und Buchkunst in Leipzig between 1962 and 1966.

In 1986 he was head designer of posters and music records covers at the Empresa de Grabaciones y Ediciones Musicales (EGREM) in Havana and graphic director of PM Records and the Pablo Milanés Foundation in 1992. In 1983 he was an assistant to Prof. Albert Kapr from the Hochschule für Grafik und Buchkunst in the Course on Book Design, Havana.

== Collective exhibitions ==
- 1964 - "II Salón Nacional de Carteles Cubanos", Museo Nacional de Bellas Artes de La Habana
- 1964 - the Bach International Contest, Germany
- 1975 - Book Art Show, Moscow, Russia
- 1979 - "1000 Carteles Cubanos de Cine. 20 Aniversario de la Cinematografía Cubana", Museo Nacional de Bellas Artes de La Habana
- 1983 - "Exposición V Aniversario del Grupo Antillano en Homenaje a Wifredo Lam", Cuba
- 1991 - "Olor a Tinta" in Galería Havana, Havana, Cuba

== Awards ==
- 1964 - First Prize; Poster; Bach International Contest, Berlin, Germany
- 1965 - Diploma of Honor/Bronze Medal; William Shakespeare Contest, Leipzig, Germany
- 1971 - Bronze Medal of International Book Fair IB, Leipzig, Germany
- 1975 - Gold Medal of International Book Art Show, Moscow, Russia

== Collections ==
His works can be found in permanent collections of:

- Casa de las Américas (Havana), Havana, Cuba;
- Instituto Cubano del Arte e Industria Cinematográficos (ICAIC), Havana, Cuba;
- Museo Nacional de Bellas Artes de La Habana, Cuba.
