= Manuel Couceiro Prado =

Cuban painter (1923–1981)

- Born: July 29, 1923; Havana, Cuba
- Died: November 7, 1981 (aged 58); Havana
- Occupation: Painter

Manuel Couceiro Prado (July 29, 1923, Havana, Cuba - November 7, 1981, Havana, Cuba) was a Cuban painter and was a member of the Grupo Antillano.

== Individual exhibitions ==
Solo exhibitions included the Exposición Couceiro at the Lyceum, Havana, 1946. In 1965 Couceiro. Oleos de Manolo Couceiro was shown at the Galería de La Habana, and in 1974 Temas y Ensayos Couceiro. was seen at the Galería La Rampa in Havana.

== Collective exhibitions ==
In 1952, Couceiro Prado was part of Salón de Xilografías Cubanas, shown at the Galería La Rampa, Havana. In 1961 his work was part of the Exposición de Pintura, Grabado y Cerámica. He participated in Pittura Cubana Oggi at the Istituto Italo Latinoamericano, Piazza Marconi, Rome, Italy, in 1968. In 1980 his works were part of the Salón de Artes Plásticas UNEAC’80 at the Centro de Arte Internacional, Havana.
