= Rubén Torres Llorca =

Cuban artist (born 1957)

- Born: March 3, 1957 (age 69); Havana, Cuba
- Education: Escuela Nacional de Bellas Artes "San Alejandro" (1972–1976)
- Known for: Painting, drawing, sculpture, collage, photography
- Awards: Prize in Curatorship, AICA (1990); Visual and Media Fellowship, South Florida Cultural Consortium (1997)

Rubén Torres Llorca (born March 3, 1957, in Havana, Cuba) is a Cuban artist specializing in painting, drawing, sculpture, collages, and photography. He studied from 1972 to 1976 at the Escuela Nacional de Bellas Artes "San Alejandro" in Havana and from 1976 to 1981, studied at the Instituto Superior de Arte (ISA), also in Havana. Torres resided in Mexico City, Mexico, from 1990 to 1993 and has resided in Miami, Florida, since 1993.

== Selected solo exhibitions ==
- 2015 "Better Days Ahead" Juan Ruiz Gallery, Miami, Florida
- 2012 "One of Us Can Be Wrong and Other Essays" Juan Ruiz Gallery, Miami, Florida.
- 2010 "Figure 1 to 20" Now Contemporary Art, Wynwood, Miami, Florida.
- 2009 "Los Peores Hombres Cuentan las Mejores Historias" Praxis, New York, New York.
- 2008 "The Names Have Been Changed to Protect the Guilty" Museo de Arte de Puerto Rico (MARP), San Juan, Puerto Rico.
- 2008 "Manual de Carpinteria China" Praxis, Wynwood, Miami, Florida.
- 2007 "Una Historia Para Niños Basada en un Crimen Real", Centro Cultural Español, Coral Gables, Florida.
- 2006 "Pagador de Promesas", Galeria Thomas Cohn, São Paulo, Brazil.
- 2006 "Easy to Build/Modelo Para Armar" Frost Museum, Miami, Florida
- 2005 "If They Pay You For It ", Praxis International, Coral Gables, Florida
- 2004 "Take This Waltz", Byron Cohen Gallery, Kansas City, Mo
- 2002 "Si Pierdo la Memoria que Pureza", Locust Projects, Miami, Florida
- 2001 "Secret Life", Gary Nader Fine Arts, Coral Gables, Florida
- 2000 "Last News From Havana", Byron Cohen Gallery, Kansas City, Missouri
- 1999 "Better Death Than Alive", Freites Revilla Gallery, Coral Gables, Florida
- 1998 "So Quiet in Here", El Museo del Barrio, New York, New York.
- 1998 "Gotan", Der Brucke, Buenos Aires, Argentina.
- 1998 "Fill in the Blanks", Monique Knowlton Gallery, New York, New York.
- 1997 "All my Lies are Wishes", Joyce Goldstein Gallery, New York, New York.
- 1997 "The Pledge", Fred Snitzer Gallery, Coral Gables, Florida
- 1996 "Eight Visits to the Artist's Studio", Miami Art Museum, Florida
- 1995 "The Anchor", Marta Gutierrez Fine Arts, Miami Beach, Florida
- 1993 "Casa Tomada", Expositum, Mexico DF.
- 1992 "Ya No Te Espero", Ninart, Centro de Cultura, Mexico DF.
- 1990 "La Trampa", Centro Cultural Ciudad de Buenos Aires, Argentina.
- 1990 "La Soledad", Museo Benjamin Carrion, Quito, Ecuador.
- 1989 "Una Mirada Retrospectiva", Centro de Artes Platicas Luz y Oficios, La Habana, Cuba.
- 1988 "El Hombre Incompleto", Galeria Habana, Cuba.
- 1987 "A Semejansa Nuestra", Centro Cultural Capilla Britanica, Mexico DF.
- 1987 "Estrictamente Personal", Fototeca de Cuba", La Habana, Cuba.
- 1985 "Tus Bacterias y las Mias", Universidad Iberoamericana, Mexico DF.
- 1985 "El lado de la Sombra", Universidad Veracruzana, Jalapa, Mexico.
- 1983 "Cine del Hogar", Galeria Habana, Cuba.
- 1981 "Fumar Daña Tu Salud", Casa de la Cultura de Plaza, La Habana, Cuba.

== Selected group exhibitions ==
2015

- "Making Circles in the water" Juan Ruiz Gallery, Miami, Florida

2014

- "Art Wynwood" Juan Ruiz Gallery, Miami, Florida
- "Short Story" Juan Ruiz Gallery, Miami, Florida
- "Feria Iberoamericana de art" Juan Ruiz Gallery, Caracas, Venezuela
- "It's only a Paper Craft" Juan Ruiz Gallery, Miami, Florida
- "Pinta Miami" Juan Ruiz Gallery, Miami, Florida

2013

- "Art Miami" Juan Ruiz Gallery, Miami, Florida
- Bienal del Sur en Panamá 2013
- "Personal is Political" Hardcore Gallery, Miami, Florida
- "Gallery Funds Collective" Juan Ruiz Gallery, Miami, Florida
- "The Infinite Lightness of Being: A Tribute to La Virgen de la Caridad del Cobre" Olga M. and Carlos Saladrigas Gallery, Miami, Florida

2012

- "Art Miami" Juan Ruiz Gallery, Miami, Florida

2011

- "The 2011-2012 CINTAS Foundation Fellowship Award Winners" Miami Dade College, Freedom Tower, Miami, Florida
- "Declaring Independence" Phoenix Institute of Contemporary Art, Phoenix, Arizona

2010

- "Recent Acquisitions" El Museo del Barrio, New York, New York.
- "Cuba Avant-Garde" Katonah Museum of Art, Katonah, New York.
- "Unbroken Ties: Dialogues in Cuban Art." Flint Institute of Arts, Michigan
- "PARALLEL CURRENTS Snite Museum of Art, Notre Dame, Indiana.
- "Recent Acquisitions from the Latin American Art Collection" Museum of Art | Fort Lauderdale.

2009

- "Cuba Avant-Garde" The Lowe Museum, Coral Gables, Florida.
- "Arte TransCubano" Galeris Chico Zapote, Mexico DF.
- "Irreversible" The Cisneros Fontanal Art Foundation (CIFO), Miami, Florida.
- "Aesthetics & Values" The Gallery at Green Library, Florida International University (FIU), Miami Florida.

2008

- "Visiones:20th Century Latin American Art" Boca Raton Museum of Art, Boca Raton, Florida.
- "Cuban Avant-Garde" Harm Museum of Art, Gainesville, Florida.

2007

- "M4" Design Miami/ Buena Vista Building, Miami, Florida.
- "Cuban Avant-Garde" Ringling Museum of Art, Sarasota, Florida.
- "Witches, Bitches and Saints" Miami Dade College, Kendal Campus, Florida.

2005

- "Iturria-Torres LLorca", Praxis International, Coral Gables, Florida.
- "Go Figure!", Lowe Art Museum, Coral Gables, Florida.
- "Beyond All That", World Arts Building, Miami, Florida.

2004

- "Permanent Collection", Nassau County Museum, New York.
- "Tres", GDS gallery, San Jose, Costa Rica.

2003

- "Visual Poetics" Miami Art Museum, Florida.
- "American Art Today", Frost Museum, Miami Florida.
- "Thinking Outside the Sphere", Museum of Science, Miami, Florida.
- "Inside the Paper", Centro Cultural Espanol, Coral Gables, Florida.

2002

- "Art from Cuba", State Russian Museum, St Petersburg.
- "Miami Currents", Miami Art Museum, Miami, Florida.
- "Contemporanea", Coconut Convention Center, Miami, Florida.

2001

- "Drawing Conclusions" Design Miami/ Buena Vista Building.

2000

- "En Casa", Museo Nacional de Bellas Artes, La Habana, Cuba.

1999

- "The Present Absent" Museo Palacio Imperial, Rio de Janeiro, Brazil.
- "The Dream Collection", Miami Art Museum Florida.

1998

- "The Narrative Art", Lowe Art Museum, Coral Gables, Florida.

1997

- "Breaking Barriers", The Museum of Art, Fort Lauderdale, Florida.
- "Cultural Consortium Fellowship Exhibition", Miami Art Museum, Florida.

1996

- "Modernismo y Sincretismo", Centro Atlantico de Arte Moderno, Las Palmas de Gran Canarias/
- Centre d'Art Santa Monica, Barcelona, Spain.
- "Defining the 90's" Museum of Contemporari Art (MOCA), Miami, Florida.

1994

- "Abril", Museo Nacional de Bellas Artes, La Habana, Cuba.

1992

- "Von Dort Aus: Kuba., Ludwing Forum Internationale Kunst, Aachen, Germany.
- "La Decada Prodigiosa", Museo del Chopo, Mexico DF.

1991

- "El Collage Contemporaneo", Centro Cultural Arte Contemporaneo, Mexico DF.

1990

- "Kuba Oklahoma", Städtische Kunsthalle, Düsseldorf, Germany.

1989

- "XX Bienal de São Paulo", São Paulo, Brazil.
- "III Bienal de La Habana", Museo Nacional de Bellas Artes, La Habana, Cuba.
- "No Por Mucho Madrugar Amanece Mas Temprano", Fototeca De Cuba, La Habana.

1988

- "Signs of Transition", Museum of Contemporary Hispanic Art (MOCHA), New York, New York.
- "Raices en Accion", Museo Carrillo Gil, Mexico DF.

1987

- "XII Drawing Biennial" Centre Georges Pompidou, Paris, France.

1986

- "II Bienal de La Habana", Museo Nacional de Bellas Artes, La Habana, Cuba.

1984

- "I Bienal de La Habana", Pabellon Cuba, La Habana.

1983

- "Sano y Sabroso", Galeria L, La Habana, Cuba.

1982

- "Retrospectiva de Arte Joven", Salon Lalo Carrasco, La Habana, Cuba.

1981

- "Volumen I", Galeria de Arte Internacional, La Habana, Cuba.

== Awards ==
During his life he had obtained many awards and recognitions, among them we can quote in 1990 the Prize in Curatorship of the International association of Arts Critics (AICA) for Una Mirada Retrospectiva exhibited, in Havana. And in 1997 he was awarded with the Visual and Media Fellowship, for the South Florida Cultural Consortium, Florida.

== Permanent collections ==
- Museo Nacional de Bellas Artes, La Habana, Cuba.
- Fototeca de Cuba, La Habana.
- Ludwig Forum Fur Internationale Kunst, Aachen, Germany.
- El Museo del Barrio, New York, New York.
- Flint Institute of Arts, Michigan.
- Miami Art Museum (MAM), Miami, Florida.
- The Frost Museum, Miami, Florida.
- Museum of Contemporary Art (MOCA), Miami, Florida.
- The Lowe Museum, Coral Gables, Florida.
- Bass Museum, Miami Beach, Florida.
- Miami Dade College, Florida.
- The Museum of Art, Fort Lauderdale, Florida.
- The Nassau County Museum, Roslyn Harbor, New York.
- MUAC Contemporary Art Museum, UNAM, Mexico DF.
- Centro de Arte Contemporaneo, Mexico DF.
- Museo de Arte Contemporaneo de Michoacan, Mexico.
- Kendall Art Center, Miami, Florida

== See also ==
- Cuban art
- List of Latin American artists
- List of Cubans
