= José Rodríguez Fuster =

Cuban artist (born 1946)

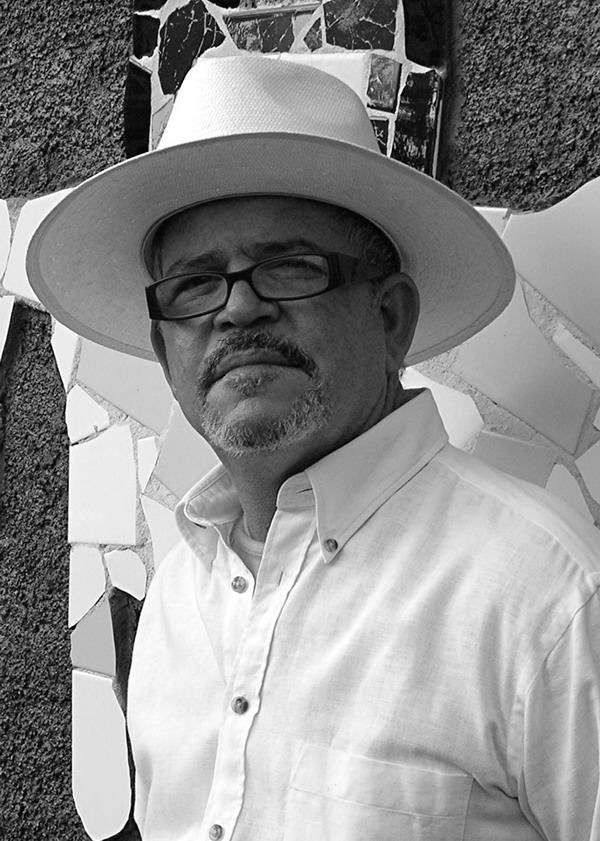
- Born: August 1946 (age 79); Villa Clara, Cuba
- Education: Escuela Nacional de Instructores de Arte
- Occupation: Artist
- Known for: Ceramics, painting, drawing, engraving, graphic design
- Movement: Naïve art

José Rodríguez Fuster (born August 1946 in Villa Clara, Cuba) is a Cuban artist specializing in ceramics, painting, drawing, engraving, and graphic design.

== Career ==
From 1963 he studied at the Escuela Nacional de Instructores de Arte in Havana. As a professional, he was commissary of several exhibitions and was a member of the Cuban Association of artist and craftsmen (ACAA).

== Individual exhibitions ==
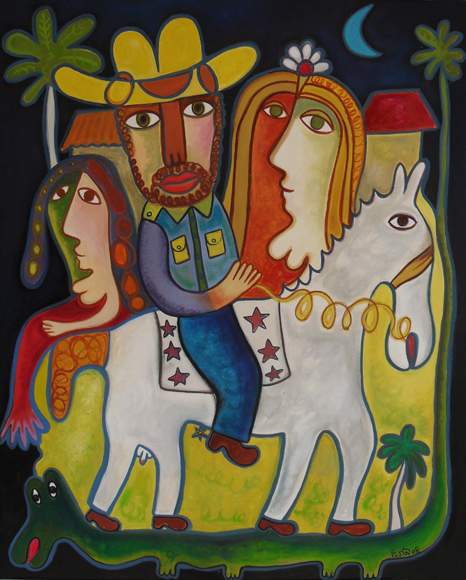
A Caballo, Oil on canvas, 74 x 60 cm.

Fuster did several solo exhibitions of his work, including Acuarelas y dibujos. Alegría de vivir in 1967, which traveled to several galleries in Havana. Drawings and ceramics was shown in 1976 at the Opera Theater Hall in Bucharest, Romania. In 1994 he presented Acuarelas y Cerámicas de Fúster at the Galería Espacio Abierto, Revista Revolución y Cultura, Havana. He presented Oil Paintings by Fúster in 1998 in Lyon, France. In 2007 his works were exhibited at The colours of life in The North Wall Gallery, Oxford, England and in 2008 at La Galleria, Pall Mall, London where he presented his ceramics and paintings in 'The colours of Cuba'.

== Collective exhibitions ==
Fuster has participated also in many group shows. In 1966 he was selected for Arte Popular, a show presented by ENIA (the National School of Art Instructors), at the Centro de Arte Internacional, Havana. In 1975 the exhibit Cerámicas Cubanas was seen at the Museo de Artes Decorativas, Havana. His work was part of Graphics, Photographs, Books and Handcrafts from Cuba, seen in New Delhi, India. In 1997 he was in the Feria Internacional de Artesanía. FIART '97. PABEXPO in Havana.

== Community work ==
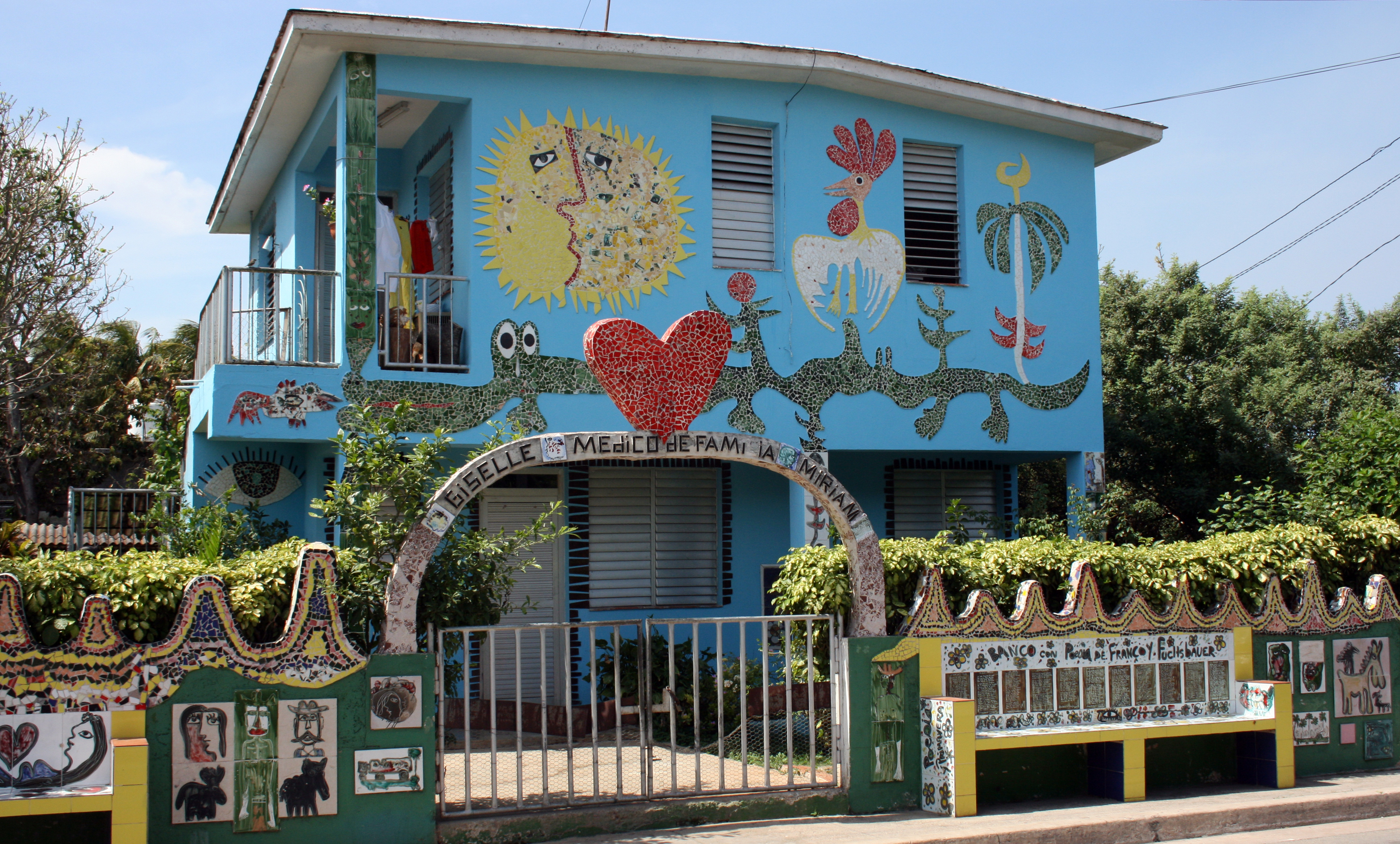
The Doctor's surgery decorated by Fuster.

Fuster has made a major contribution over 10 years of work of rebuilding and decorating the fishing town of Jaimanitas in the outskirts of Havana, where he lives. Jaimanitas is now a unique work of public art where Fuster has decorated over 80 houses with ornate murals and domes to suit the personality of his neighbours, he has built a chess park with giant boards and tables, The Artists’ Wall composed of a quilt of dozens of tiles signed and donated by other Cuban artists, a theatre and public swimming pools.

His recent work is recognized as part of Cuba's public art landscape. His large-scale mosaic installations have frequently been compared by commentators to the public works of Antoni Gaudí in Barcelona and Constantin Brâncuși's sculptural ensemble in Târgu Jiu, Romania. Fuster has stated that the project has been financed primarily through the sale of his paintings and ceramic works.

== Awards ==
In 1974 Fuster won a prize in ceramics at the IV Salón Nacional Juvenil de Artes Plásticas, held at the Museo Nacional de Bellas Artes de La Habana.

== Collections ==
His pieces can be found in collections at the Center for Cuban Studies, New York; the Museo de la Cerámica, Castillo de la Real Fuerza, Havana; and the Museo Nacional de Bellas Artes de La Habana.
