= Tomás Sánchez =

Cuban painter and engraver (born 1948)

- Born: Tomás Sánchez; May 22, 1948 (age 78); Aguada de Pasajeros, Cienfuegos, Cuba
- Known for: Painting, engraving
- Notable work: Desde las aguas blancas
- Awards: First Prize of Drawing for Young Artists, National Exhibition of Arts (1971); First Prize in Painting, National Salon of Professors and Instructors of Art, Havana (1975); First Prize in Lithography, National Salon of Professors and Instructors of Art, Havana (1975); XIX International Prize of Drawing Joan Miró (1980); National Prize for Painting, Havana Biennial (1984); Medal, V American Biennial of Graphic Art, Cali (1986); Honorable Mention, International Painting Biennial, Cuenca (1987)

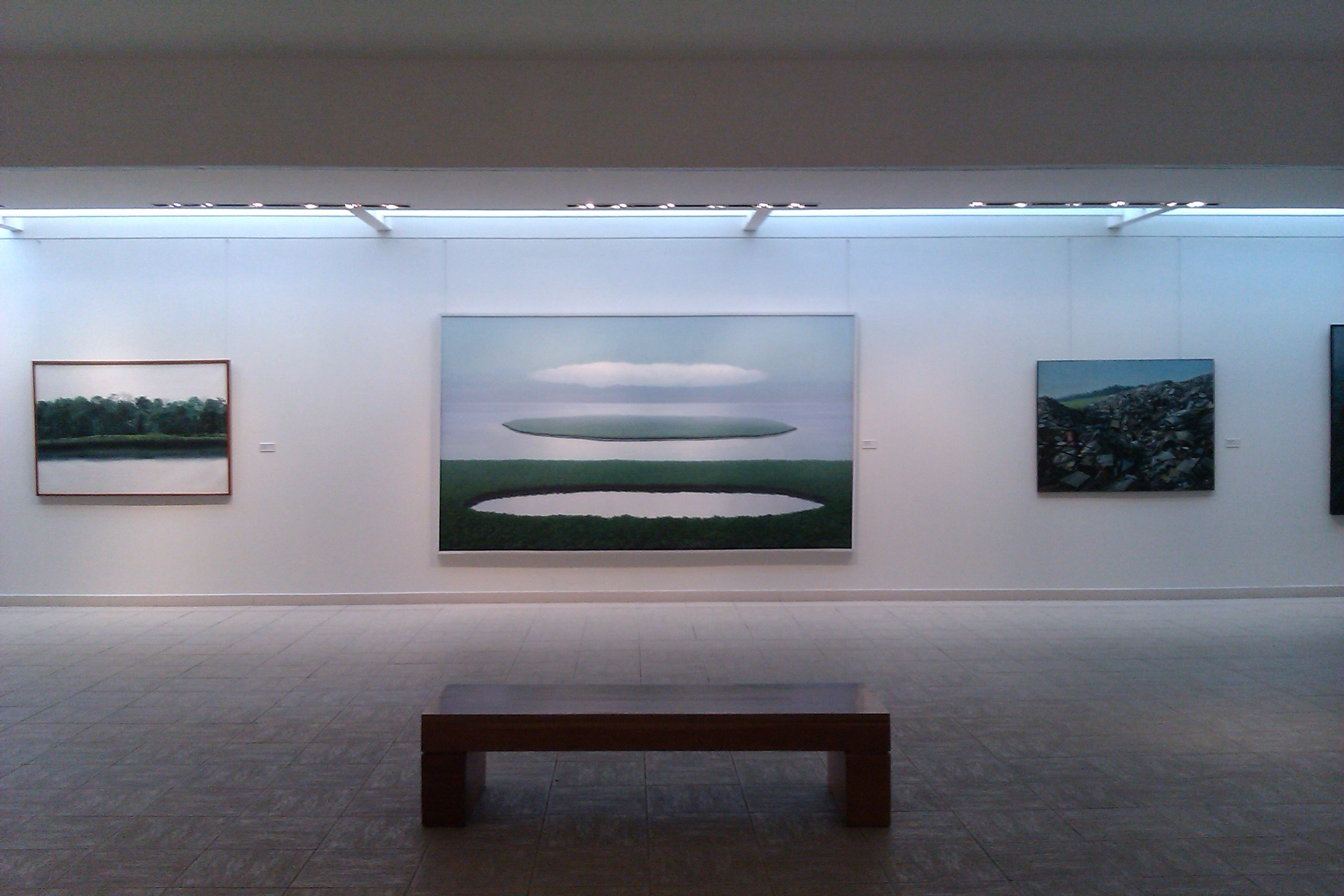
Painting by Tomás Sánchez (center) in Museo Nacional de Bellas Artes de La Habana

Tomás Sánchez (born May 22, 1948, in Aguada de Pasajeros, Cienfuegos, Cuba) is a Cuban painter and engraver, known for his landscapes. Sánchez is the most expensive living Cuban painter.

== Biography ==
=== Early life and education ===
Sánchez is the eldest of two sons of a middle-class family; his father was a sugar worker and businessman and his mother shared with him the sensibility for painting.

At 16, in 1964, he moved to Havana and began to study painting at the National Academy of Fine Arts San Alejandro. In 1966 he interrupted his studies and later, in 1967, moved to the newly founded National Art School (ENA), where he graduated in 1971. Also in 1971 he was awarded the First Prize of Drawing for Young Artists at the National Exhibition of Arts.

=== Career ===
From his graduation until 1976, Sánchez remained in the National Art School as engraving professor; in 1975 won the First Prize in Painting and the First Prize in Lithography at the National Salon of Professors and Instructors of Art in Havana. From 1976 to 1978, Sánchez worked as stage designer at the Teatro de Muñecos (Children's Theater) of the Ministry of Culture (Cuba).

In 1980 he won the First Prize at the XIX Edition of the International Prize of Drawing Joan Miró, for his work Desde las aguas blancas, which launched his international career. The following year, he had an exhibition at the Joan Miró Foundation, Centre of Contemporary Art in Barcelona, Spain.

Other awards include the National Prize for Painting. Havana Biennial (1984); Medal of V American Biennial of Graphic Art, Cali, Colombia (1986); and Honorable Mention. International Painting Biennial, Cuenca, Ecuador (1987).

His work has been exhibited in over 30 countries. Among his most significant personal exhibitions include: Tomás Sánchez. Retrospective at the National Museum of Fine Arts, Havana, Cuba (1985); Tomás Sánchez. Different Worlds at the Museum of Art, Fort Lauderdale, Florida, USA, (1996). In May 2008, Sánchez celebrated his 60th birthday with a big show at the Museum of Contemporary Art in Monterrey Mexico.

In May 2019 three of his paintings headed to Christie's Latin American Art sales.
