= Víctor Patricio de Landaluze =

Spanish painter

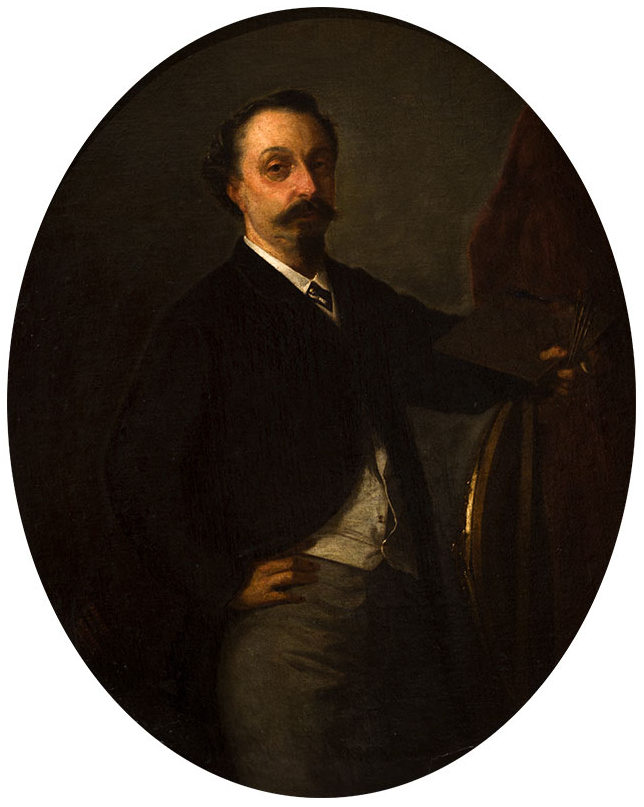
- Born: 1828; Bilbao, Spain
- Died: June 8, 1889 (aged 60–61)
- Known for: Painting, Illustration, Caricature
- Movement: Costumbrismo

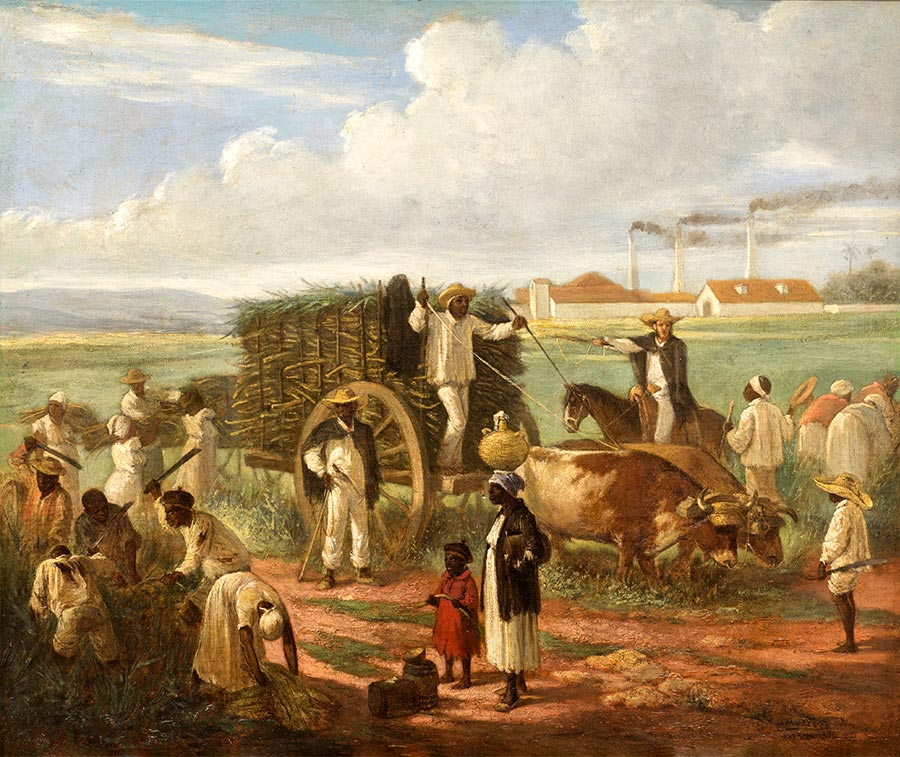
Cutting sugar cane Oil on canvas,1874

Víctor Patricio de Landaluze (1828 - 8 June 1889), was a Spanish-born painter active for much of his career in Cuba.

== Biography ==
Born in 1828 in Bilbao, Landaluze received a careful education, which included learning several languages. For a time he resided in Paris. His presence in Cuba was recorded around the year 1850. He is the best-known Cuban practitioner of costumbrismo, depicting Cuban peasants (guajiros), landowners, and slaves. He taught at the Academy of Fine Arts of San Alejandro in Havana, and served as its director. He opposed Cuban independence, an attitude reflected in his work; nevertheless his paintings provide a valuable view of nineteenth-century Cuban society. His works also depict a somewhat idealized view of plantation life.

His first work consisted in the illustration of the book The Cubans painted by themselves. In 1862, he founded the satirical and cartoon newspaper Don Junípero and in 1881, he illustrated the work Tipos y Costumbres de la Isla de Cuba. Several of his works, including Three Kings Day in Havana, are in the Museo Nacional de Bellas Artes de La Habana.
