= Osvaldo Yero Montero =

- Exhibition shot, Photo by Mohammad Salemy, 2004
- Born: 23 August 1969; Camagüey, Cuba
- Known for: sculpture, Installation art

Osvaldo Yero Montero (born October 23, 1969) is a Cuban artist, who creates sculpture and installations.

== Individual exhibitions ==
Osvaldo Yero Montero was born on October 23, 1969, in Camagüey, Cuba.

He had many personal exhibitions, which include "La Hora de las Estrellas" presented in 1989, Alejo Carpentier Gallery, Camagüey, Cuba. In 1995 he exhibited his works in "De Corazón a Corazón. Una de Cada Clase"in Fundación Ludwig de Cuba, Centro de Conservación, Restauración y Museología (CENCREM), Havana, Cuba. In this year he also presented "Souvenirs, Algo para Recordar". And in 1997 he made "Al rescate de la fauna", Galería Teodoro Ramos Blanco, Havana, Cuba.

== Collective exhibitions ==
He was part of many collective exhibitions. In 1989 he participated in the V Salón Provincial Fidelio Ponce de León, Centro Provincial de Artes Plásticas y Diseño, Camagüey, Cuba. In 1994 he was one of the selected artists for "La Jeune Peinture Cubaine", Maison de la Culture du Lametin, Fort de France. In this year some of his images were selected for "Arte Cubano de Hoy@ at the Galerie de L'UQAM, Université du Québec à Montréal.

In 1998, he was one of the selected artists for "Contemporary Art from Cuba: Irony and Survival on the Utopian Island" Arizona State University Art Museum, Tempe.
