= José Abreu Morell =

Cuban painter

José Arburu Morell (1864–1889) was a Cuban painter. A native of Havana, he studied from 1877 until 1886 at the San Alejandro Academy in that city. He also traveled to Madrid to study at the Real Academia de Bellas Artes de San Fernando.
