= Leandro Soto =

Cuban-American artist (1956–2022)

- Born: March 13, 1956; Cienfuegos, Cuba
- Died: July 3, 2022 (aged 66); Los Angeles, California
- Occupations: Visual artist, performance artist, set designer, costume designer

Leandro Soto (born Leandro Soto Ortiz; March 13, 1956 – July 3, 2022) was a Cuban-American multidisciplinary visual/installation and performance artist. He was also a set and costume designer for theater and film. Soto studied at Escuela Nacional de Arte National Art Schools (Cuba) and Instituto Superior de Arte, University of Havana. As an educator he taught and lectured at various Higher Education institutions in the U.S. and abroad. Soto also founded a creative workshop, El Tesoro de Tamulte, in Tabasco, Mexico, from which professional artists emerged.

== Biography ==
Soto was born on March 13, 1956, in Cienfuegos, Cuba, where he also spent his early life.

Soto was one of the leading figures of the influential “Volumen Uno”, an artistic movement that changed the course of Cuban Art in the decade of the 1980s, in which he was the first artist in his generation to work with the Afro-Cuban heritage. He was also credited with being the first performance and installation artist on the island.

In his performances and the visual/installation art which emerged from his performances, Soto responded to the postmodern coordinates of implosion and satire, often subverting the inceptions of culturally accepted notions of high/kitsch, traditional/pop, global/local, and profane/sacred art forms. Throughout his artistic career, he demonstrated an interest in religion, ritual, and the mythology of indigenous people.

Soto died July 3, 2022, in California.

== Selected solo exhibitions ==
- 2023 Creation in the Moment without Past: the legacy of a remarkable man. The Department of Cultural Studies: Errol Barrow Centre for Creative Imagination, University of the West Indies, Barbados, West Indies
- 2018 Crónicas visuales. Museo Nacional de Bellas Artes. Havana, Cuba (current catalog, ISBN no. pending)
- 2015 hacia todas partes ir II. (Everywhere I go) La Acacia Art Gallery, Havana, Cuba.
- 2013 Carpentier in Barbados. Errol Barrow Center for Creative Imagination Art Gallery. University of The West Indies. Barbados, West Indies.
- 2012 Leandro Soto: Open Windows to the Caribbean. Museum of Finest Cuban Art. Vienna, Austria.
- 2011 Cuba in the Southwest: The Art of Leandro Soto. Sangre de Cristo Art Center: Hoag Gallery. Pueblo, Colorado.
- 2006 Leandro Soto Recent Works. Paulina Miller Art Gallery. Phoenix, Arizona
- 1997 A Glance over the Garden. Big Orbit Gallery. Buffalo, New York
- 1992 Resonancias de la selva (Resonances of the jungle). Galería Nina Menocal, México D.F.
- 1984 Retablo familiar (Family altarpiece). Casa de la Cultura. Plaza Gallery and Art Center. Havana, Cuba.

== Selected group exhibitions ==
- 2019 Sacbé, Camino de Intercambio (White Road, Exchange Path). Casa del Benemérito de las Américas Benito Juárez, Old Havana, Cuba.
- 2017 Adiós Utopía: Art in Cuba Since 1950. The Museum of Fine Arts. Houston, Texas
- 2014 Drapetomania, The 8th Floor, New York, NY
- 2011 Ajiaco: Stirrings of the Cuban Soul. Newark Museum, Newark, New Jersey.
- 2008 Cuba! Art and History from 1868 through Today. Musee des Beaux Arts de Montreal, Quebec
- 2004 Confluencias: Leandro Soto and Raoul Deal. Walker's Point Center for the Arts, Milwaukee, Wisconsin
- 1998 Ceremonial Lands. Buffalo Arts Studios. Buffalo, New York.
- 1997 Breaking Barriers. Museum of Fine Arts of Ft. Lauderdale. Florida.
- 1987 Prague Quadrennial of Stage Design, Prague, Czech Republic
- 1989 Kitsch. Third Havana Biennial. Galiano-Concordia Art Center. Havana, Cuba.
- 1981 Volumen Uno. International Art Center. Havana, Cuba

== Selected collections ==
Soto's work is held in a number of institutional collections, including:

- The CIFO Collection, Miami. FL.
- MOCA. Museum of Contemporary Art, North Miami. FL.
- Museo Nacional de Bellas Artes, Havana, Cuba
- Jerome Lawrence and Robert E. Lee Theater Research Institute. Ohio State University. Columbus, Ohio
- Museum of Finest Cuban Art, Vienna, Austria
- Dr. Arturo and Lisa Mosquera, Private Collection of Contemporary Art, Miami, FL
- Mount Holyoke College Art Museum. South Hadley Mass.

== Selected publications ==
- El tesoro de Tamulté: arte desde el trópico. Phoenix. Ariz.: Editorial Orbis Press. 2003. OCLC 58678600.
- O'Reilly-Herrera, Andrea, ed. (2001). "Testimony of an Artist". Remembering Cuba: legacy of a diaspora (1st ed.). Austin: University of Texas Press. p. 245. ISBN 0292731477.
- Fusco, Coco, ed. (1999). "Performance in Cuba in the 1980s". Corpus delecti: performance art of the Americas (1st ed.). New York: Routledge. p. 266. ISBN 9780415194549.
- González-Pérez, Armando, ed. (1999). "chapter E-Motions/E-Motions". Presencia negra: teatro cubano de la diáspora (Antología Crítica) (in Spanish). Madrid: Editorial Betania. ISBN 8480171111.
