= Grupo Antillano =

Cuban artistic group

Grupo Antillano was a Cuban artistic group was formed by 16 artists, between 1975 and 1985, in Havana, Cuba.

== Members of the group ==
- Rafael Queneditt Morales (Director). Sculpture and engraving
- Esteban Guillermo Ayala Ferrer (1929–1995). Graphic and environmental design.
- Osvaldo Castilla Romero Sculpture, gold and silver work.
- Manuel Couceiro Prado (1923–1981). Painting.
- Herminio Escalona González. Sculpture.
- Ever Fonseca Cerviño. Painting and engraving.
- Ramón Haiti Eduardo. Painting and sculpture.
- Angel Laborde Wilson. Painting, drawing, ceramics, humor.
- Manuel Mendive Hoyo. Painting, drawing and performance.
- Lionel Morales Pérez. Painting and textile design.
- Claudina Clara Morera Cabrera. Painting.
- Miguel de Jesús Ocejo López. Painting and drawing.
- Marcos Rogelio Rodríguez Cobas. Sculpture, drawing, ceramics and painting.
- Arnaldo Tomás Rodríguez Larrinaga. Painting and drawing.
- Oscar Rodríguez Lasseria. Ceramics, sculpture, drawing.
- Pablo Daniel Toscano Mora (born Caibarién, Las Villas, 18 November 1940; died Havana; 14 August 2003). Painting, drawing, cartoons, graphic design.

== Exhibitions ==
- 1968 – AFROCUBA: Works on Paper, 1968–2003
- 1978 – Expo-Venta del Grupo Antillano in Centro de Arte Internacional, Havana, Cuba;
- 1978 – Headquarters of Conjunto Folclórico Nacional, Havana, Cuba
- 1978 – VI Festival Internacional de Ballet, Havana, Cuba
- 1978 – Temporada de Danza Nacional de Cuba, Havana
- 1979 – Exposición Homenaje a Fernando Ortíz in Biblioteca Nacional José Martí, Havana, Cuba, with guests artists such as Wifredo Lam, René Portocarrero, Manuel Mendive, Anselmo Febles Bermúdez, Roberto Diago, and Armando Posse
- 1982 – II Festival de la Cultura de Origen Caribeño, Salón de Exposiciones UNEAC, Biblioteca "Elvira Cape", Santiago de Cuba, Cuba
- 1980 – Antilska Skupina/Grupo Antillano in the House of Cuban Culture, Prague, Czech Republic
- 1980 – Gallery of the Cultural Committee, Sofia, Bulgaria
- 1981 – Carifesta’81 in International Gallery, Community College, Bridgetown, Barbados
- 1981 – América negra in Instituto del Tercer Mundo, Mexico City, Mexico
- 2013 – Drapetomania: Exposición Homenaje a Grupo Antillano in Galería Arte Universal, Santiago de Cuba, Cuba
- 2013 – Drapetomania: Exposición Homenaje a Grupo Antillano in Centro de Desarrollo de las Artes Visuales, Havana, Cuba

== Collections ==
Their works are part of the permanent collections of the Casa del Caribe in Santiago de Cuba.
