= Atelier Calder =

Artist residency program based in France

Founded in 1989, by members of Alexander Calder's family in collaboration with the Centre national des arts plastiques (CNAP), the Atelier Calder residency program offers artists the residencies to create new work and projects in Calder's studio and home in Saché, France.
