= Consuelo Castañeda =

Cuban artist (born 1958)

- Born: 1958 (age 67–68); Havana, Cuba
- Education: San Alejandro Academy of Fine Arts
- Notable work: Cybernetic Information Center
- Movement: Contemporary art
- Awards: Cintas Foundation, 1997-1998
- Website: consuelocastaneda.net

Consuelo Castañeda (born 1958, Havana, Cuba) is a Cuban artist, professor, and art critic whose work includes painting, installations, photography, graphic art, architecture, and print. She was a major part of a movement of the relationship between art and politics in the 1980s avant-garde scene and revolutionized how women were treated in the art world. Castañeda is also credited with helping to catapult the cultural production of the Cuban avant-garde onto the international stage and shifting the popular understanding of the relationship between art and politics in Cuba, as well as in broader Latin America. Castañeda was living in Miami, Florida until 2016, and then moved back to Havana, Cuba.

== Biography ==
In 1977, Castañeda attended the San Alejandro Academy of Fine Arts in Havana, Cuba. She then attended the Advanced Institute of Fine Arts in Havana, Cuba in 1982 where she would then teach and add contemporary discourse to the curriculum.

As a professor at the Instituto Superior de Arte in Havana, Castañeda was a champion for performance art in the academic setting. She was a pivotal figure in Cuba until her emigration to Mexico, and then Miami in the 1990s. Her work as a painter, photographer and multimedia installation artist, has recently shifted to social media and digital format. Her focus is on creating interactive works that anyone with a modem and a computer can readily access.

In the 1980s, she was a member of the artist collective Equipo Hexágono ( or Hexágono Equipo de Creación Colectiva) alongside artists Humberto Castro, Sebastián Elizondo, Antonio Eligio Fernández (TONEL), Abigail García and María Elena Morera. Equipo Hexágono was active in Havana between 1982 and 1985 and later in the United States, as their work was exhibited as late as 2022 in Miami.

After relocating to the United States, and following her interest in internet art, she presented the installation Cybernetic Information Center at the Miami Art Museum, which is now known at Pérez Art Museum Miami.

== Collections ==
Her workis housed in public and private collections such as the Pérez Art Museum Miami, Florida, the Allen Memorial Art Museum at Oberlin College, Ohio, Lowe Art Museum at University of Miami, the Museum of Art and Design (MoAD), at Miami Dade College, and is featured in the Rodriguez Collection housed at the Kendall Art Center, Miami.

== Awards ==
She was awarded with the Cintas Fellowship as an installation and multidisciplinary artist in 1997–1998.

== Exhibitions ==
The artist participated in the three following editions of the Havana Biennial, Cuba, 1984, 1986, and 1991, and the Miami Biennale.

Her work was included in the group exhibition Killing Time: An exhibition of Cuban artists from the 1980s to the present curated by Glexis Novoa, Elvis Fuentes, and Yuneikys Villalonga in New York City in 2007.

The solo show and mid-career retrospective For Rent: Consuelo Castañeda, curated by Gabriela Rangel, and presented at the Americas Society, New York, in 2011. The exhibition alluded to the work of Venezuelan artist Gego and provided social commentary on Fidel Castro's political regime in her native Cuba.

In 2016, the artist returned to Cuba to present her first solo exhibition and career retrospective after 30 years without showing new work in her home country. The exhibition was held at Gran Teatro, Havana.

In 2020, Castañeda's work was included in Isolation, a virtual show reflecting on social distancing pushed by the COVID-19 global pandemic, organized by an art venue in Miami. In 2022, Consuelo Castañeda's work was featured in the group exhibition and publication Exercises to be Happy: Ephemeral Practices in 1980s Cuba curated by Glexis Novoa in Miami.

=== Solo exhibitions ===
- 1987¿Quien la presta los brazos a la Venus de Milo?, Teatro Nacional de Cuba, Havana
- 1989 La Historia reconstruye la Imagen, Castillo de la Real Fuerza, Havana
- 1992 Consuelo Castañeda, Centro de Cultura, Mexico City
- 1995 To Be Bilingual at the Fredric Snitzer Gallery, Coral Gables, Florida
- 1996 Consuelo Castañeda and Quisqueya Henríquez Collaboration, Morris-Healy Gallery, New York
- 2001 New Work Miami at the Museo de Arte Moderno (MAM), Miami, Florida.
- 2008 Finding the Self, Art@Work, Miami, Florida
- 2011 For Rent: Consuelo Castañeda, Americas Society, New York
- 2015 Walls on Walls, Faena Art, Miami
- 2016 CCC 2016, Gran Teatro Alicia Alonso, Havana
- 2018 Consuelo Castañeda: Instants, Dot Fiftyone Gallery, Miami

=== Group exhibitions ===
Consuelo Castaneda's work was and continues to be included in numerous group exhibitions across Latin America, the United States in countries like Cuba, Mexico, and Australia.

2016	Return Engagement; Show in Havana, Cuba.
2014	Global Positioning Systems: Forms of Commemoration. PAMM's permanent collection. July 29; Women At The Edge Of An Island. Sweet Home: Museo Cubano. Miami. July 26
2013	Reverse: Rewriting Culture. Dot Fiftyone Gallery. Wynwood, Miami, FL. May 8 – July 5; New Media Festival MADA. PSH Project Gallery. Wynwood Art District. Miami, FL.; Primera Bienal del Sur en Panamá. Figaly Convention Center. Ciudad de Panamá; Never Ending Moment. The Art Link Gallery. 130 NW 36 Street, Miami, FL 33127.; Islands. Cuban American Phototheque. 4260 SW 74 Ave. Miami. Fl.; Cachita, the infinite lightness of being. Belen Jesuit Preparatory School. Miami, FL.
2012	New Work Miami. Miami Art Museum (MAM). Miami, Fl. USA. Nov 2012– May 2013; Practices Remain. Regina Rex Gallery. 1717 Troutman St., Queens, NY. Jul–Aug; Practices Remain. Miami Design District. March 10–24.
2008	Why are we here? 801 Projects. Miami, Fl, USA.; Fortuna. La Bodega Spac, (part of 801Projects) Wynwood, Miami, Fl, USA.
2007	Killing Time: An exhibition of Cuban artists from the 1980s to the present. Exit Art Gallery. NYC. USA.; Cuba Avant Garde: Contemporary Cuban Art from The Farber Collection.; The Samuel P. Harn Museum, University of Florida, Gainesville.USA.
2006	Artchitecture. The Bentley Bay Building, Miami Beach, Fl. USA; Light in Contemporary Art As Seen in a Selection from the Berezdivin Collection. Espacio 1414. Puerto Rico
2005	Nowhere, Alonso Art Gallery, Wynwood, Miami, Florida, USA.
1999	Time of Our Lives. New Museum. New York, NY, USA.
1998	Miami Arts Project. Miami Beach, Florida, US.; Cuba On: 11 Conceptual Photographers. Generous Miracles Gallery. New York, USA.
1997	The Crystal Stopper. Lehmann Maupin Gallery. New York, USA.
1996	Warehouse Project. Sponsored by Rosa de la Cruz & Fred Snitzer. Miami, Fl. USA.; Vivir es dejar huella, Instituto Cultural Cabañas, Guadalajara, Jalisco, Mexico.
1995	Traces: The Body in Contemporary Photography. The Bronx Museum of Art. New York. USA.; Still Lives: 4 Interactions with the Past. Ground Level /South Florida Art Center. USA.
1994	Alter Nations, Gallery 312, Chicago, IL.; Consuelo Castaneda & Quisqueya Henriquez, INTAR Gallery, New York, US.; Cubana, The Cuban Museum of Art & Culture, Miami, Florida, US.; Selected Gallery Artists. Fredric Snitzer Gallery. Coral Gables, Florida, US.; Day by Day. Gutierrez Fine Art Gallery. Miami Beach, Florida, US.; Las Nuevas Majas, Otis Art Gallery, Otis College of Arts and Design, Los Angeles, CA.
1993	Art Miami' 93, Convention Center of Miami Beach, Fl, USA.; Las Nuevas Majas, Casona II. Secretaría de Hacienda y Crédito Público, México, D.F.
1992	Los Cubanos llegaron ya. Ninart, Centro de Cultura, México D.F.; Ante America: Cambio de Foco, Biblioteca Luis Ángel Arango, Bogotá.; La Década Prodigiosa: Plástica Cubana de los 80, Museo del Chopo, México, D.F.; Expo Arte Guadalajara 92, Salón de Ferias, Guadalajara, México.; Once Artistas Cubanos, Museo del Carmen, México, D.F.; Plástica Cubana Contemporánea, Sala de Exposiciones SECOFI, México, D.F.
1991	15 Artistas Cubanos, Ninart, Centro de Cultura, México, D.F.; Arte Cubano Actual, IV Bienal de la Habana, Galeria Manolo Rodríguez, La Habana, Cuba.; Los Hijos de Guillermo Tell, Artistas Cubanos Contemporáneos.; Museo de Artes Visuales Alejandro Otero, Banco de La República de Colombia. Bogotá.; Nuevas Adquisiciones Contemporáneas, Muestra de Arte Cubano, Museo de Bellas Artes, La Habana, Cuba.
1990	Arte Contemporáneo de Cuba. Museo de Arte Contemporáneo de Sevilla, España.; Cinco Pintoras, Galería Arte y Promoción, México, D.F.; Proyecto C&Q, Museo Universitario del Chopo, México
1989	Contemporary Art from Havana, Riverside Studios, London, UK.; Made in Havana, Australian Centre for Contemporary Art, Melbourne.; Art Gallery of New South Wales, Sidney and Museum of Contemporary Art, Brisbane, Australia.; De La Habana. Museo de la Ciudad de México. México. D.F.; 1988 Signs of Transitions: 80's Art from Cuba, Museum of Contemporary Hispanic Art (MOCHA), New York, USA.; Muestra de Arte Cubano. Centro de Arte y Comunicación (CAIC), Buenos Aires, Argentina.; Arte Cubano. Centro Cultural de Buenos Aires "La Recoleta". Buenos Aires, Argentina.; Exposición de Artistas Cubanos, Galería Nesle, Paris.; Three Cubans Artists, Gallery 76, Toronto; Forest City Gallery, London, Ontario.; Muestra de Pintura Cubana . Moscu.
1987	Aire Fresco, Galería Habana, la Habana, Cuba.; Consuelo Castaneda y Humberto Castro, Museo Provincial de Villa Clara. Cuba.
1986	II Bienal de La Habana, Museo Nacional de Bellas Artes, La Habana, Cuba.; XVII Festival Internacional de la Pintura de Cannes Sur Mer, Francia.; El Arte con la sonrisa, Milán, Venecia, Regio Emilia, Turin, Genova y Roma.
1985	Exposición Internacional, XII Festival de la Juventud y los Estudiantes, Moscu.
1984	I Bienal de La Habana, Museo Nacional de Bellas Artes, La Habana, Cuba.; Salón UNEAC, Museo Nacional de Bellas Artes, La Habana, Cuba.
1983	Plástica Cubana Contemporánea, Museo de Bogotá, Colombia.; Encuentro de Jovenes Artistas Latinoamericanos, Casa de Las Américas, La Habana, Cuba; Concurso Internacional de Dibujo "Joan Miro". España.; Documentos e Instalaciones. Equipo Hexago. Galería Habana. La Habana. Cuba
1981	Concurso 13 de Marzo, Galería L. La Habana, Cuba.
