= Antonio Rodriguez Morey =

Cuban painter (1872–1967)

Antonio Rodríguez Morey
- Born: 4 March 1872; Cádiz, Spain
- Died: 7 December 1967 (aged 95); Havana, Cuba
- Education: Academia Nacional de Bellas Artes San Alejandro
- Occupations: Painter, educator, museum director
- Known for: Painting

Antonio Rodriguez Morey (1872–1967) was one of the pre-eminent Cuban landscape painters. He was born in Spain, in 1874 and studied painting at the San Alejandro national school of fine arts in La Habana, Cuba.

In 1891 he moved to Europe to continue his training at the Academy of Fine Arts of Florence and the Free School of the Academy of Fine Arts of Rome. He also taught drawing at the Sacred Heart Institute of Rome. His works were exhibited in Cuba, Italy, France, Germany, Austria, The United States and Panama. He won several prizes including a National Prize to the best landscape in La Habana (1911) and a Gold Medal Award in San Francisco (1915). In 1912 he was appointed to teach drawing, anatomy and art history at the San Alejandro Academy. In 1918 he became Director of the National Museum of La Habana, since 1955 Director emeritus.
