= Juan Francisco Elso =

Cuban artist

Juan Francisco Elso (August 1956 – 1988), born Juan Francisco Elso Padilla in Havana, Cuba was a Cuban artist. He created art in a variety of media, such as drawing, painting, engraving, and sculpture, and also did installations.Using mostly natural materials, his sculptures explore the complex identities of Cuban, Caribbean, and Latin American cultures. In 1972, he finished his studies in the Escuela Nacional de Bellas Artes “San Alejandro” in Havana. From 1972–1976, he studied in Escuela Nacional de Arte in Havana. He was also a teacher at 20 de Octubre School of Arts during the 1970s and 1980s.

== Individual exhibitions ==
In 1982 he presented his first personal exhibition, "Tierra, maíz, vida" at the Casa de Cultura de Plaza in Havana. In 1986 he presented "Ensayo sobre América" at the same venue. In 1990, "Por América" was shown at the Museo de Arte Alvar y Carmen T. de Carrillo Gil in México. In 1991, "Latin American Spirituality. The sculpture of Juan Francisco Elso (1984-1988)" was shown at M.I.T. List Visual Arts Center in Boston, Massachusetts, in the United States.

== Collective exhibitions ==
He took part in many collective exhibitions like Volumen I at the Centro de Arte Internacional in Havana in 1981. In 1984, he was selected to participate in the I Bienal de La Habana at the Museo Nacional de Bellas Artes (MNBA) in Havana. In 1986, he participated at the XLII Biennale di Venezia in Venice, Italy and also in the second Havana Biennial Bienal de La Habana at the MNBA. In 1988, he was involved in Signs of Transition: 80's Art from Cuba at the Museum of Contemporary Hispanic Art in New York City. In 1997, he was part of "Así está la cosa. Instalación y arte objeto en América Latina" at the Centro Cultural Arte Contemporáneo in A.C., México.

== Awards ==
In 1982, Elso obtained the First Prize in "Salón Paisaje'82"', at the MNBA.

== Collections ==
His work can be found in collections such as the Centro Cultural/Arte Contemporáneo in A.C., México; Magali Lara, México; and the MNBA, Cuba.

Elso died on November 27, 1988.He saw himself as a fighter and wanted to die fighting, but he never expected his battle to be against his own body. He had diagnosed himself with leukemia weeks before doctors confirmed it. He believed this self-awareness connected to the way he used his own blood in his art.
