= Grupo ABTV =

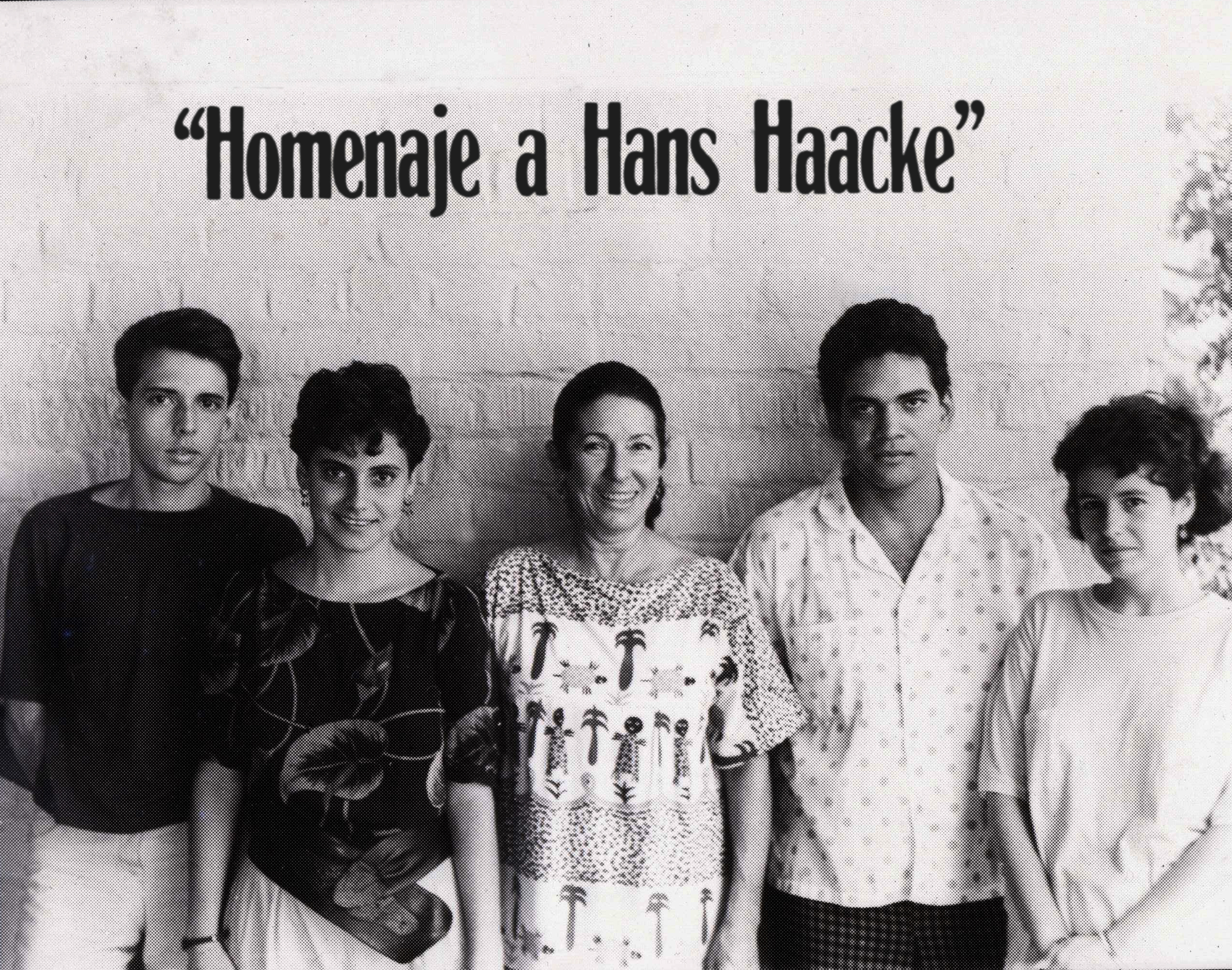
Grupo ABTV Homage to Hans Haacke unpublished book cover. From left to right, Juan Pablo Ballester, Ileana Villazón, Marcia Leiseca (President of the Council of Visual Arts), José Toirac and Tanya Angulo, 1989

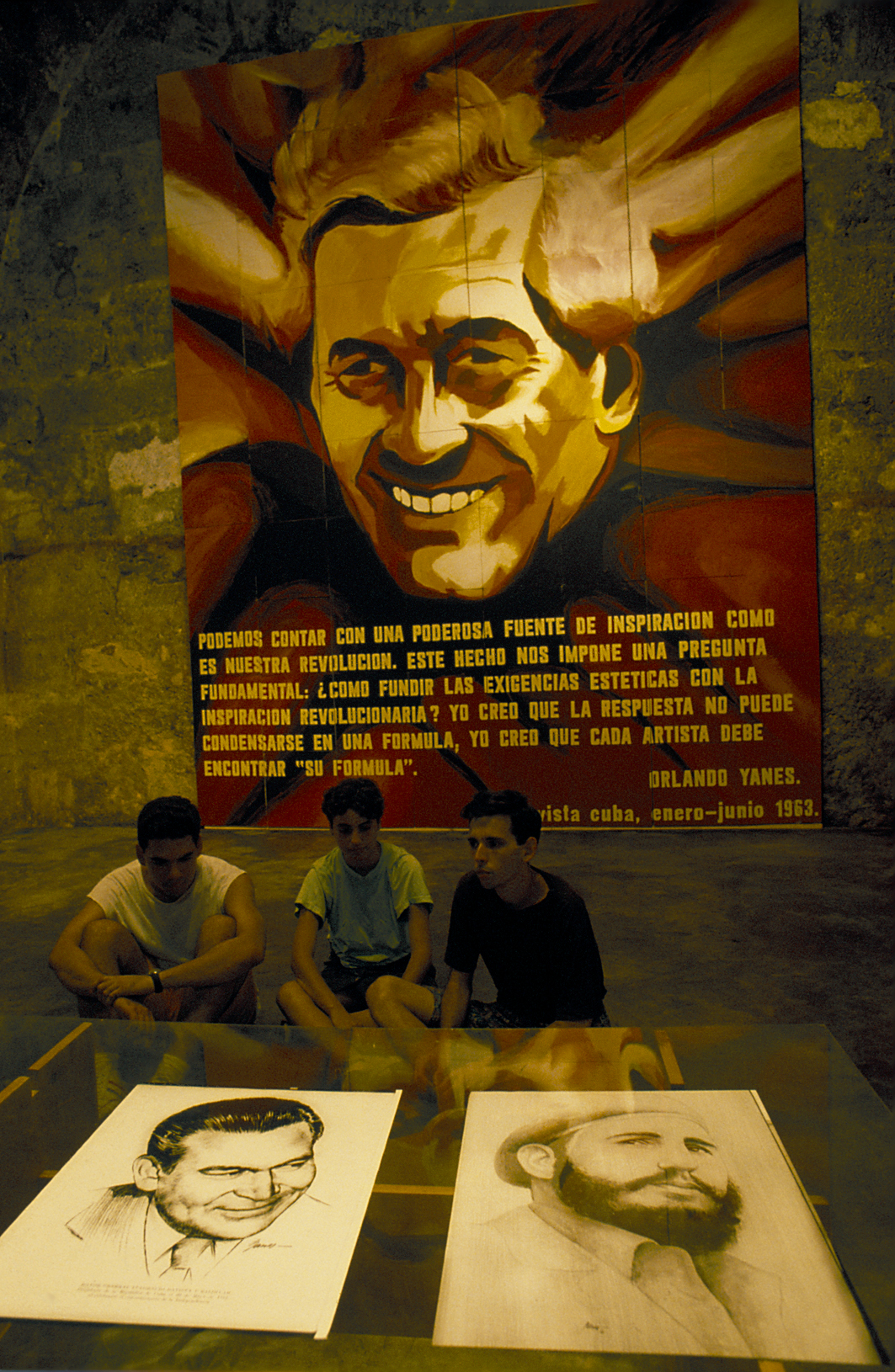
From left to right, José Toirac, Ileana Villazón and Juan Pablo Ballester in The Smile of Truth piece, Homage to Hans Haacke, Castle of The Real Force, Havana, Cuba, 1989

Grupo ABTV (ABTV Group) was the name given to the artistic collaboration between Cuban artists Tanya Angulo (1968), Juan Ballester Carmenates (1966), José Toirac (1966) and Ileana Villazón (1969) by the Uruguayan artist and critic Luis Camnitzer.

== The beginning of the Group ==
Camnitzer created the acronym with the surnames of its members during his research on Cuban art that he would later publish as New Art of Cuba. In his book Camnitzer refers to ABTV work as “possibly the most rigorous group in Cuba today (…) Though they occasionally produce individual work, the group as such applies itself to appropriating other artists’ work to make theoretical criticism about culture and society. The team started with Ballester and Villazón, with Toirac joining a little later, and them Angulo. By 1989 they decided to split up again, although temporarily. They regrouped in 1991. Ballester and Villazón set the direction of the group with a team project realized while they were studying in the ISA”. Juan Ballester Carmenates and Ileana Villazón used quotation and Appropriation (art) as a creative procedure as well as the use of curatorship as a critical structure in their exhibition El que imita fracasa (He Who Imitates Fails) that they presented in 1988 at Galería L in Havana.

The artist Ballester and Villazón acted as curators of their exhibition He Who Imitates Fails while at the same time dividing themselves into many other successful Cuban artists while inventing their new work, appropriating their formal solutions to polemicize the contents, thematic and stylistic, of the parodied artists. The exhibition worked “as a critic, bringing to the fore the stylistic miseries of appropriation. The works magnified those telltale effects of a constant search for prestige in the use and abuse of metropolitan models”. Ballester and Villazón questioned controversial local issues such as the relationship between mainstream and periphery, cultural policy and national identity, international Avant-garde and local adaptations, Art market and notion of style, original and aura vs. copy.

The use of strategies such as quote and appropriation, as well as manipulation through exhibition curation, simulating institutional mechanisms capable of altering the functionality of each work, would be incorporated to a greater or lesser extent in all ABTV projects.

In 1989, while studying at the Instituto Superior de Arte (ISA) (The University of Arts of Cuba), Juan Ballester Carmenates, José Toirac and Ileana Villazón were invited to participate in Young Cuban Artist, an exhibition curated by Rachel Weiss for the Massachusetts College of Art and Design in Boston. Ballester, Toirac and Villazón carried out a team work in which they rephotographed reproductions of the famous appropriationist Sherrie Levine, the gesture of appropriation of their reproductions in books and art magazines critically pointed to the only way in which international art could be consumed in Cuba, deprived of direct experience through its massive reproduction. Parodying the titles of the famous North American artist the work was called After Sherrie Levine.

This strategy of manipulating through the curatorship of exhibitions and simulating the institutional mechanisms capable of altering the functionality of each work, would be incorporated to a greater or lesser extent in all ABTV projects.

For Luis Camnitzer “What is interesting in the work of this group is that they do not use the appropriation process like a recipe. Instead, each project has its own distinct structure and point, all carefully researched. The ABTV team can be better understood, in their present work, as a counterpart to the U.S. Group Material than as followers of Sherrie Levine (…) ABTV works with appropriation, or with the appropriation of appropriation, but there is always an ethical component in the work, an element of social criticism. The reference to art becomes a metaphor, not an end in itself, at least not in formalistic terms. A particular tension is created by the use of a procedure traditionally considered unethical, as plagiarism would be, to transmit messages based on moral indignation".

== ABTV’s Projects ==
=== "Nosotros": Exposición antológica de la obra de Raúl Martínez (“We": Anthological Exhibition of Raúl Martínez's Work) (1989), Provincial Center for Plastic Arts and Design, Havana, Cuba. ===
In 1990 ABTV received the Special Prize of the Cuban Section of International Association of Art Critics (IAAC) for this exhibition.

From July to December 1988, the Museo Nacional de Bellas Artes de La Habana ((MNBAC) (National Museum of Fine Arts of Cuba) presented a major exhibition of the work of Raúl Martínez (artist) under the “museological conception” of Corina Matamoros, specialist from the Museum. (Note: Raúl Martínez pass away in 1995. In January 2012, Corina Matamoros published her research Raul Martinez: La Gran Familia (Raúl Martínez: The Big Family), in which she argues an interpretation acceptable to the Cuban government. Cuban Art News published a conversation with Corina where she summarizes his investigation: https://cubanartnews.org/en/2012/10/25/conversacion-sobre-el-libro-raul-martinez-la-gran-familia/] Raúl Martínez: La Gran Familia, Ediciones Vanguardia Cubana, Habana 2012, Spanish, English, 253 pages. ISBN 8493604771 ISBN 978-8493604776)

For young Cuban artists, Raul Martinez's work was a point of reference in the problem of recontextualizing international artistic trends within the rigid official discourse of national identity.

For ABTV the National Museum presented the work of Raúl Martínez (artist) as a great socialist, colorful and pop propaganda billboard, which celebrated the social achievements of the Revolution while hiding the complex scaffolding of contradictions of a complex, at times violent, revolutionary process that the same artist had suffered and was somehow implicit in the author's representative irony. The Museum exhibition focused on formal analysis that presented him as a successful artist, while displacing or omitting the contents of his complicated relationship between personal life and artistic production in relation to the social and historical context and its institutions. (Note: “… I approached political figures and difficulties came because that was not the image that was wanted. I'm starting to have problems because I wasn't supposed to be the right one to paint those things". Raúl Martínez in "I am no longer an avant-garde artist", interview by Angel Tomás, published in the Juventud Rebelde newspaper on July 3, 1988. “The climate of homophobia and intolerance, which has been growing since the mid-1960s, with the installation of concentration camps of the Unidades Militares de Ayuda a la Producción (UMAP) (Military Units to Aid Production), spread to the culture through eventual arrests, expulsions from centers work or specific censorship. According to various testimonies of Padilla and Cabrera Infante himself, Virgilio Piñera, José Triana (poet) and José Mario were briefly imprisoned, they separated the black Marxist Walterio Carbonell from UNEAC, the pop artist Raúl Martínez (artist) was suspended from the Art Schools and the works of theater 'María Antonia' by Eugenio Hernández Espinosa and 'Los mangos de Caín' (The mangoes of Caín) by Abelardo Estorino were censored by the Consejo Nacional de Cultura (National Council of Culture)”. Guillermo Cabrera Infante at "Mea Cuba before and after", Galaxia Gutenberg, Barcelona, 2005, p. 485, cited by Rafael Rojas at "Brief history of censorship in Cuba (1959—2016)" at razon.com.mx https://www.razon.com.mx/el-cultural/breve-historia-de-la-censura-en-cuba-1959-2016/)

A few days after the closing of Nosotros (We) at the Museo Nacional de Bellas Artes de La Habana (MNBAC) (National Museum of Fine Arts of Cuba), ABTV inaugurated its alternative anthological exhibition at the Provincial Center for Plastic Arts and Design in Havana in January 1989. “We": Anthological Exhibition of the Work of Raúl Martínez parodied the title of the Museum exhibition and criticized it by emphasizing the problematic contents that the official exhibition avoided. For this ABTV selected six works not included in the official exhibition and accompanied them with factual documentation. One of these works was made by ABTV in collaboration with Raúl Martínez (artist) as a nod of complicity between the artist and the alternative rereading that the new generations made of the work of the established artist. (Note: "Nosotros’: exposición antológica de la obra de Raúl Martínez’ ('We': An Anthological Exhibition of the work of Raúl Martínez) already placed the cultural institutions as historical activators or repressors of the contents of the artistic work. ‘We…’ exposed the need to restore the loss of original content due to the extortion that the practical circumstance to speak from the work. It also unmasked the mercantile fetishism of the artistic signature, and the performative arbitrariness of each work displaced from its original context. The curatorship was also used to evade and sanction myths of institutional criticism, as critical manipulation of criticism". Sánchez, Osvaldo. "Acciones of Toirac — Tanya and Ballester — Villazón", supplement in the catalog Kuba o.k. Aktuelle Kunst aus Kuba. Städtischen Kunsthalle Düsseldorf, 1990.)

=== Homenaje a Hans Haacke (Homage to Hans Haacke) (1989), Castle of The Force Project, Castle of The Real Force, Havana, Cuba. ===
It is impossible to understand this project without an introduction to the context.

The Proyecto Castillo de la Fuerza (Castle of The Force Project) In the late 1980s, the cultural life of Havana was shaken by a wave of young art critical of the tightness of the structures of the Cuban government. (Note: In 1985, the former Soviet Union began the reform process called Perestroika led by Mikhail Gorbachev, among other side effects, Perestroika progressively undermined the ability of the Soviet Union to fulfill its economic commitments to Cuba. In 1986 Fidel Castro embarked on his own set of self-proclaimed reforms as the "Rectificación de errores” (Rectification of Mistakes) campaign. In 1989 Mikhail Gorbachev visited Cuba and many Cubans hoped that the visit would spur political reforms initiated in the USSR or in Eastern Europe, but the Rectification of errors policy and Perestroika pursued diametrically opposed objectives and highlighted the rupture of the Cuba–Soviet Union relations. During this period of high tension, the VI Congreso de la Unión Nacional de Escritores y Artistas de Cuba (UNEAC) (VI Congress of the National Union of Writers and Artists of Cuba) was held in January 1988. Fidel closed the congress with the following statement “Socialism’s reason for being is to elevate man’s capabilities and possibilities to a maximum, to also elevate the freedom of creation to its highest degree, not only in form, but also in content.”, that same year the Ministry of Culture censored the exhibition A Tarro partido II (A jar jar II) by Tomás Esson at Gallery 23 and 12 in Havana. On June 12, 1989, General Arnaldo Ochoa was arrested on charges of drug trafficking and a month later he was shot with three high-ranking military officers. Between 1988 and 1989 several artistic projects were censored: Carlos Rodríguez Cárdenas Artista de calidad (Quality Artist), Habana Gallery, Fondo Cubano de Bienes Culturales (Cuban Fund of Cultural Assets); the exhibition and performance Nueve alquimistas y un ciego (Nine Alchemists and a Blind) by Grupo Arte Calle (Group Street Art) at Galería L; the performances of the Group AR-DE (art-law) in the 23 y G park.) These projects were developed in galleries with high visibility and others were carried out directly in public spaces. Following the controversy, Armando Hart Dávalos, Minister of Culture, published an article in the official Granma (newspaper) of the Central Committee of the Communist Party of Cuba. (Note: Armando Hart expressed the need to create alternative spaces in which to channel and control the new critical art, which due to its character “is always accompanied by a certain harshness against the above and a determined interest in impacting an audience” thus, “may the Party today have the certainty that it has cultural institutions and organizations of creators with political seriousness, professional rigor and ready to decisively help such issues". Hart, Armando. “Freedom and discipline”, Granma (newspaper), Thursday, July 21, 1988.) In his article, the Minister of Culture did not hide his concern about how the new critical audiovisual production, which was exhibited in some state galleries not suitable for the content of the works, could be received by the Communist Party of Cuba and interpreted by a society without rights to spaces for exercise institutional criticism and without cultural education in Contemporary art. (Note: "Already in the late 1980s, cultural institutions did not know how to confront the opportunism of the Party's dogmatists without killing the mental effervescence of those young people born with the Revolution. Power could not understand that this ruthless criticism was the last resort of the Revolution's own legitimacy as a living event". Sánchez, Osvaldo. "Utopía bajo el volcán. The Cuban avant-garde in Mexico", Plural Magazine, Mexico City, 1992, republished in Santana, Andrés Isaac. Nosotros los más infieles. Narraciones críticas sobre el arte cubano (1993–2005), Murcia: CENDEAC, 2007, p. 113)

In this context, the Castle of The Force Project arises. (Note: After several setbacks in the rehabilitation of the castle, the Proyecto Castillo de la Fuerza (Castle of The Force Project) was inaugurated on March 25, 1989 after a nine-month pre-production period. Seventeen young artists should participate cycles of six exhibitions. According to its authors: “Among its fundamental objectives was to group the proposals in the most recent plastic arts that had systematically operated in the artistic medium. The Project brought together a plurality of artistic discourses that prevailed in the cultural environment. The aim was to create a space where the discussion of the political could be taken to the artistic level and avoid the political criteria defining the suitability of the aesthetic and the artistic. It was conceived by artists and cultural institutions as an attempt to create a space of gradual opening to gain mutual trust between creators and power and between creators and society. It seemed that, finally, the Force had a Castle”. The organizers would participate in the project as artists along with Glexis Novoa, Tomás Esson, Carlos Rodríguez Cárdenas, Adriano Buergo, Ana Albertina Delgado Álvarez, ABTV, Sandra Ceballos, René Francisco, Eduardo Ponjuán, Francisco Lastra and Segundo Planes distributed in six formed exhibitions by teams of three and four artists.) Taking as a frame of reference the concerns of the Minister of Culture, its organizers, Félix Suazo, Alexis Somoza and Alejandro Aguilera, conceived it as “a project that would make it possible to carry out critical artistic proposals in a space for debate that would lay the foundations for later circulation broader social ”, they were assisted by the former Vice Minister of Culture Marcia Leiseca who then chaired the Consejo Nacional de las Artes Plásticas (CNAP) (National Council of Visual Arts). (Note: The Consejo nacional de las Artes Plásticas (CNAP) (National Council of Visual Arts) began operating in April 1989 as a state body subordinate to the Ministry of Culture, it was made up of four national institutions —Centro de Desarrollo de las Artes Visuales (Center for the Development of Visual Arts), Fondo Cubano de Bienes Culturales (BFC) (Cuban Fund of Cultural Assets), Centro Wifredo Lam (Wifredo Lam Center) and Museo Nacional de Bellas Artes de Cuba (National Museum of Fine Arts of Cuba)— and a representative group of “the most relevant personalities of the plastic arts in Cuba”. The Council outlined the policy for the promotion of the visual arts in Cuba and established the mechanisms for its implementation.) With irony, the Project took as its name the name of the building where it would be developed, the Castillo de la Real Fuerza (Castle of the Royal Force) of Havana, an old Spanish military fortress that, after having been the headquarters of different cultural institutions by then, functioned as an exhibition space attached to the National Museum of Fine Arts.

The production process of the Project included several meetings between the organizers, the invited artists and the National Council of Visual Arts subordinated to the Ministry of Culture, the meetings should guarantee the control of the contents as well as an assessment of their possible repercussion in context. (Note: Despite the control of the National Council of Visual Arts during the fourth exhibition, the problems began. The Ministry of Culture pressured the Council to dismantle some paintings from the exhibition Artista melodramático (Melodramatic Artist) by René Francisco and Eduardo Ponjuán that approached the figure of Fidel Castro in a "disrespectful" manner. The artists accepted the censorship and the exhibition was still open to the public, but Marcia Leiseca was dismissed as President of the Council.) The Homage to Hans Haacke exhibition was scheduled as the fifth exhibition and should have opened in late September 1989. ABTV presented their project as a tribute to German conceptual artist Hans Haacke, the parody and quote of "political seriousness and professional rigor" of the German author's methodology was again used as a resource for a deep critique of institutions and official cultural policy. The exhibition overcame the initial control mechanisms and came to be installed in the Castle, but hours before the opening the alarm went off, the National Council of Visual Arts called an urgent meeting with Omar González (Note: The Vice Minister of Culture, the poet Omar González, held the position of President of the National Council of Visual Arts when Marcia Leiseca was dismissed. The organizers of the project were not invited to the closed-door meeting, but the officials of the Council were, among them the Artistic Vice President of the Council and artist María Magdalena Campos Pons and Elmo Hernández. Since 1995 Elmo Hernández has been working for the Ludwig Foundation in Havana. During the celebration of the twentieth anniversary of the creation of the Foundation in 2015, Abel Prieto, President of the Councils of State and Ministers, defined Elmo Hernández as “one of our most brilliant promoters and intellectuals”, Elmo in turn “honored two personalities of Cuban culture who bet from the beginning on the achievement of the Foundation: the poet Omar González and Dr. Armando Hart, for trusting in the usefulness of promoting this space in our civil society aimed at filling gaps in the cultural network". Pedro de la Hoz, "Ludwig Foundation of Cuba: vanguard and participation", Granma (newspaper), January 28, 2015 http://www.granma.cu/cultura/2015-01-28/fundacion-ludwig-de-cuba-vanguardia-y-participacion) where the contents of some works were questioned because the Ministry of Culture found it problematic. The officials of the Council demanded to suppress information that the artists considered essential for the understanding of their works. Consistent with Haacke's methodology, ABTV refused to meet the Council's demand, them the exhibition was "canceled" not without the Council first demanding that the content of the meeting not be unveiled in order to prevent the “failed negotiation” from being construed as official censorship. Tanya Angulo and José Toirac did not agree to release a note that Juan Ballester Carmenates and Ileana Villazón wrote detailing the details of the censorship. Ballester and Ileana printed hundreds of copies that they distributed themselves the night Homage to Hans Haacke was due to open. The Ministry of Culture deleted all information related to the censorship of Homage to Hans Haacke. In 1990 the Kuba o.k. exhibition was opened at the Stadtische Kunsthalle Düsseldorf. The project, which was curated by Jurgen Harten and advised for the Ministry of Culture by the artist Antonio Eligio Tonel, included in the catalog an Osvaldo Sánchez text on ABTV, as the text provided information on Homage to Hans Haacke, the Ministry of Culture pressured Harten to suppress the Osvaldo Sánchez text from the catalog. Harten had no choice but to yield to official pressure but finally he published the text as an annex to the catalog, distributing it within him. When the catalog arrived in Cuba, the Ministry of Culture kidnapped all annexes. In 1991, Art collector Peter Ludwig expressed interest in buying the controversial The Smile of Truth, but the National Museum of Fine Arts declared it of heritage interest and acquired it for his collection even though the Museum has never allowed its public display. ABTV was dissolved after the censorship of Homage to Hans Haacke. In 1991 Ileana Villazón went into exile in Mexico and in 1992 Juan Pablo Ballester went into exile in Spain. (Note: Despite its internal policy of prohibitions and censorship in the late 1980s, the Ministry of Culture changed its policy of international promotion of the visual arts, the change would allow any artist with a letter of invitation to carry out a project abroad could leave the country without having to go through the strict control mechanisms to which any artist invited to exhibit abroad was normally subjected. The change in the Ministry of Culture policy made possible for many young critical artists to leave the country and many, disappointed with the new environment of censorship and the imminence of a great economic crisis that the government would call the "Período especial" (Special Period), took advantage of the openness to exile.)

ABTV ended its text of presentation of the catalog with the following self-critical reflection: "paradoxically, our criticism of the institutional framework could also be registered as institutional self-criticism", but the unexpected closure of Homage to Hans Haacke recalled that, even after a period of tolerance, censorship continued to be part of the repressive framework of the totalitarian regime, because "...In Cuba, as in any other regime of real socialism, censorship is a resource of the State, inscribed in the Constitution, the Penal Code and the laws". The need for dialogue and negotiation that Castle of The Force Project and the Ministry of Culture failed. (Note: The Bohemia magazine of October 20, 1989 published an interview by Juan Sanchez to Armando Hart entitled “Cultura cubana, escudo ideológico y moral” (Cuban culture, ideological and moral shield), in which the Minister of Culture declared: “We have to demand respect for the deepest ethical, political, and cultural principles as well. Often, when there is a carelessness in the treatment given to patriotic symbols, it is a result of the fact the right artistic form hasn’t been found, (but no matter what) for ethical reasons it os necessary to be careful to present the symbols of our society in a dignified manner exalting the highest values of Cubanism". In January 1990, the well-known actor Sergio Corrieri, head of the Department of Culture of the Central Committee of the Partido Comunista de Cuba (PCC) (Communist Party of Cuba), published the article "Reflections on artistic and literary creation today" in the magazine El Militante Comunista (The Communist Militant) edited by the Departamento de Orientación Revolucionaria (DOR) (Department of Revolutionary Orientation) and the Central Committee of the Communist Party of Cuba. Sergio Corrieri declared: “During 1988 and throughout 1989 some isolated events occurred in various artistic manifestations, particularly in the visual arts, which reached relative relevance and not always because of their artistic excellence (…) A delicate trend of the young visual artist current has been the treatment of heroes, national symbols and the image of the Commander in Chief. The image of the Commander or some of his identifying attributes has been treated ambiguously and obscurely in its real meaning (…) This is unacceptable. The symbols cannot be touched with ambiguity, they are necessary for the unity that our people require as an indispensable condition for the triumph of their social project. There is no valid argument that justifies the right to damage its patriotic meaning and its mobilizing capacity. An attack on them constitutes, in fact, being in the enemy's territory (…) Political institutions and cultural institutions are extremely jealous of the results of artistic works that address the theme of heroes and patriotic symbols." Quoted by Alexis Somoza in the version of his essay "La generación de la esperanza cierta" published in his book La obra no basta: ensayos y comentarios sobre arte, cultura y sociedad cubana.)

For Osvaldo Sánchez: "Homage to Hans Haacke’... was announced as an ideological operation worthy of Haacke. The extreme critical acuity towards institutions and representation - cynical, burlesque, terrible - of not a few inconsistencies between art and status, between art and merchandise, between art and politics; It seemed to be more than what the aforementioned institutions could allow. The tribute to Haacke - what a paradox, precisely to him! - never got to opened. The pieces resorted to parody effects, especially promotional manipulation was parodied. The important thing was to accuse the institutional mechanism (commercial or political) that corrupted the semantic nature of the work (...) Even though it has not was opened, Homage to Hans Haacke is one of the key exhibitions of the 1980s in Cuba; and not precisely for the reasons that determined its cancellation. Whoever likes it, the Cuban visual art from 90’s will have it as a paradigm”.

The Castle of The Force Project was closed after the censorship of Homage to Hans Haacke and the castle became the Museum of Cuban Contemporary Ceramics. In a new act of demonstration of power, the Cuban Communist Party reaffirmed the limits that young visual artists questioned as a revolutionary act. After the Project was censored, an atmosphere of cultural repression was unleashed, reminiscent of the atmosphere of "dark episodes" that occurred before the creation of the Ministry of Culture in 1976. (Note: The censorship of the documentary P.M. directed by Saba Cabrera and Orlando Jimenez Leal in 1961, the closure of the cultural supplement Lunes de Revolución same year, the withdrawal of the Paradiso (novel) by José Lezama Lima in 1966, the imprisonment of the poet Heberto Padilla in 1971, and the process of "Parameterization" of the seventies. The Parameterization “In short, it involved the application of the ‘parameters’ of revolutionary culture, established by the regime, to those who in their works and, more importantly, their people, projected values contrary to official ideology and morals”. Rojas, Rafael. “Breve historia de la censura en Cuba (1959—2016)” at razon.com.mx https://www.razon.com.mx/el-cultural/breve-historia-de-la-censura-en-cuba-1959-2016/)

==== Homage to Hans Haacke’s works ====
===== 1556—1988 =====
Work 1556—1988 established a parallel between the history of the construction of the Castillo de la Real Fuerza (Castle of The Real Force) in Havana and the history of the organization of the Castle of The Force Project. The comparison revealed analogies in terms of objectives, official production, setbacks in performance, limitations and expectations of its defensive function.

===== La sonrisa de la verdad (The Smile of Truth) =====
Orlando Yanes is a painter promoted as an official artist by the Communist Party of Cuba, because his realistic work specializes in portraits of revolutionary heroes. The Smile of Truth presented a large portrait of smiling Yanes in the billboard style of Che that he had designed for the facade of the building of the Ministerio del Interior (MININT) (Ministry of the Interior (Cuba)) in the Plaza de la Revolución (Revolution Square) and included his quote of 1963: “... we can count on a powerful source of inspiration such as our Revolution. This fact imposes on us a fundamental question: How to merge aesthetic demands with revolutionary inspiration? I believe that the answer cannot be condensed into an only one formula; I believe that each artist must find his formula”. The portrait in the style of a revolutionary propaganda billboard was supplemented by factual documentation, a resume witch included significant - omitted - facts from his artistic career before the Cuban Revolution along with photographic documentation of a portrait of Fulgencio Batista from 1952 and another one of Fidel Castro from 1986 formally represented with the same style. The work demonstrated how Orlando Yanes had used the same "formula" to express two different political realities and obtain personal benefits with the complicity of the institutions.

===== Ave Fénix (The Phoenix) =====
This work included a photocopy of the article by Jose María Juara "Hay razones para quemar un cuadro” (There are reasons to burn a painting) where the author explains the political reasons why he bought the painting El Pavo Real (The Peacock) by Manuel Mendive and later burned it in front of the Cuban Museum in Miami. According to Juara, his burning was a symbolic way to protest against "the artists who still collaborate with Castro's tyranny" and against the sale of Cuban Marxist culture in Miami. For his work ABTV bought a serigraphy by Manuel Mendive to Fondo Cubano de Bienes Culturales (BFC) (Cuban Fund of Cultural Assets) and burned it as a performance that appropriated Juara's action. The video documenting the burning of ABTV was accompanied by the text “Hay razones para quemar una serigrafía” (There are reasons to burn a serigraphy) in which its authors explained that their action opposed Juara's political manipulation, but also the cultural manipulation of the Cuban Fund of Cultural Assets by the “hyperbolization of the exchange values and commodification of the Cuban cultural heritage assuming the work of Manuel Mendive as the victim and a banner of this policy”. (Note: “In a few years, the BFC has turned Mendive's work into the banner of a mystification of the role of tradition in our visual culture, hyperbolizing - as it has happened in other genres - the presence of African roots in it . This voluntarism exhibits its justification as foreign exchange earnings and is protected by this type of acceptance of the ‘artistic visual values of our folklore’, which is nothing more than the thirst for exoticism of the metropolitan centers. Beyond what was obtained in economic matters, this super-promotion has made Mendive's work trivialize the initial contents it used, ranking its decorative values according to a market that is more quantitative than qualitative. The functional weakening of the use value of an artistic work only confirms the anthropological misery of its context". ABTV, “Homage to Hans Haacke”, presentation text of the exhibition, unpublished catalog.)

===== Una imagen recorre el mundo (An Image Travels the World) =====
In An Image Travels the World, ABTV told the little-known story in Cuba of the photograph of Che Guevara taken by Alberto Korda that became famous thanks to the editing and marketing of the publisher Giangiacomo Feltrinelli. The Italian publisher visited Havana looking for the image that he would use on the cover of his publication of the Diario del "Che" in Bolivia and the Poster that would accompany the edition. Feltrinelli chose a photo of Che de Korda and edited it, Feltrinelli did not pay copyrights and Korda did not claim them, among other things, because in the first years of the Revolution, Cuba maintained an ambiguous relationship with international Copyright laws. ABTV used the history of photography as a pretext to denounce the process of cultural and commercial fetishization to which the image is subjected by conserving, as if it were unique, an object that by its nature is multiple; and ideological fetishization as it is promoted as the image that best embodies the values of the historical character. ABTV emphasized that this fetishization was not an inherent quality of the object but was determined by the institutions that preserve and promote it. An Image Travels the World reproducing the famous photograph superimposed with its history and the work would be finished when it was sold - as a poster that recognizes itself as merchandise - for a three-peso bill. Ernesto Che Guevara had been president of the National Bank of Cuba from 1959 to 1961, in 1983 the Bank printed his three Pesos bill for the first time, it did not include the original photo of Korda but the Feltrinelli edition that made it famous. The purchase of the poster closed the cycle of the commodification of the hero reduced to its currency value.

===== Notas de Glexis (Glexis Notes) =====
ABTV closed her exhibition with this work that reflected on how the critique of institutions would end up becoming part of her falsely self-critical discourse. To do this, they intentionally invited Glexis Novoa, an artist who had already participated in the Castle of The Force Project. Glexis Notes was a work that would function as an "alternative" curatorial project within the Homage to Hans Haacke and the Project itself. For ABTV "Glexis appropriates the methodology of Homage to Hans Haacke to parody our attitude towards the institutional framework that promotes us. This work reveals that Glexis's critical attitude was premeditated by us in the same way that the institution that promotes the Project (National Council of Visual Arts), anticipated and sustained our criticism of it. These appropriation and parody procedures show that the Ministry of Culture offered its support to the Project as a way to update its institutional policy and management; that we take advantage of such coverage to make this exhibition; that Glexis used us ’to re-expose in the Project, and that we used Glexis to express all of the above". (Note: ABTV, “Homage to Hans Haacke”, presentation text of the exhibition, unpublished catalog.)

=== ¡Juntos y Adelante!. Arte, Política y Voluntad de representación (Together and Forward!. Art, Politics and Willpower of Representation) (1991), IV Havana Biennial, House of the Young Creator, Havana, Cuba. ===
In 1991 ABTV regrouped for this final project.

Por la plena igualdad. Juntos y adelante (For full equality. Together and Forward) was the slogan of a propaganda billboard designed by the Editora Política (Political Publisher) in the early 90s. (Note: "The Political Publisher was created on April 1, 1963 with the aim of disseminating the work of the Revolution through editorial and graphic supports. Its objective was to publish materials of a political-historical and economic nature, the political propaganda of the Partido Comunista de Cuba (PCC) (Communist Party of Cuba) based on their campaigns, days, ephemerides and conjunctural moments, among them the speeches of the main leaders of the Revolution, declarations of the Revolutionary Government, documents of the PCC and other texts that were oriented by the propaganda organizations subordinated to the Central Committee of the PCC." http://www.uneac.org.cu/noticias/la-editora-politica-en-el-contexto-editorial-de-la-revolucion-cubana-1963-2018) ABTV used as the conceptual structure of the project the same inclusive rhetoric of the political slogan that they cited, for this occasion they invited artists from different generations to participate, with opposing aesthetic discourses, with various formal solutions, both artists promoted by the Ministry of Culture and artists marginalized by institutions and their circumstantial cultural policies. For this project ABTV rescued works by artists who had fallen into oblivion such as the so-called Socialist realism cuban artists who in the 1970s went to study Art in the former Soviet Union, for example, from this group of realistic artists, Cosme Proenza was invited to exhibit alongside young critical artists such as Pedro Álvarez Castelló. Together and Forward! parodied the ideological cynicism with which the Editora Política (Political Editor) advertised the achievements of social integration of the Cuban Revolution. In this project, ABTV acted as curators of a choral group show that they inserted from a small cultural institution into the great official event of the IV Havana Biennial. The exhibition and the montage design of the works evaded any notion of hierarchy for use in local institutions, the works were distributed in the space through a visual design that privileged their formal values. (Note: Information provided by Juan Ballester Carmenates, former member of Grupo ABTV.)

== Bibliography ==
- Eric Hernández, Henry. "El ruido de la erudición", Hypermedia Magazine, November 24, 2020. https://www.hypermediamagazine.com/sociedad/coco-fusco-ruido-erudicion/
- Menéndez, Aldo (editor). Artists in Purgatory. Cuban artists in the Reynardus Collection, Cuban Art Alliance (Florida) / ARTIUM Publishing 2017. ISBN 0692852573 ISBN 978-0692852576
- Díaz Bringas, Tamara. "Nine Innings in 1989", Art Journal Open from Art Journal 73, no. 2, Summer 2014. artjournal.com http://artjournal.collegeart.org/?p=5378
- Weiss, Rachel. To and from Utopia in the New Cuban Art. Minneapolis: University of Minnesota Press, 2011. ISBN 978-0-8166-6515-0 cloth ISBN 978-0-8166-6514-3
- Jones, Derek. Censorship. A World Encyclopedy Volume 1—4. Spain: Fitzroy Dearbora Publishers, 2001; Routledge Taylor Francis & Group London and New York, 2015. p. 1839. ISBN 9780203827055.
- Espinosa, Magaly. “Curaduría por qué y para qué” (2001) published by Santana, Isaac Andrés (editor). Nosotros los más infieles. Narraciones críticas sobre el arte cubano (1993–2005) Spain, CENDEAC 2007. pp. 411. ISBN 978-84-96898-16-5
- Power, Kevin. “Cuba: Una historia tras otra” (1999), published by Santana, Isaac Andrés (editor). Nosotros los más infieles. Narraciones críticas sobre el arte cubano (1993–2005) Spain, CENDEAC 2007. p. 62. ISBN 978-84-96898-16-5
- Navarro Fernández, Wendy. “Pensar el arte: espacios y tentativas” (1996), published by Santana, Isaac Andrés (editor). Nosotros los más infieles. Narraciones críticas sobre el arte cubano (1993–2005) Spain, CENDEAC 2007. p. 343, 200. ISBN 978-84-96898-16-5
- Molina, Juan Antonio. “La marca de su cicatriz. Historia y metáfora en la fotografía cubana contemporánea” (1996) published by Santana, Isaac Andrés (editor). Nosotros los más infieles. Narraciones críticas sobre el arte cubano (1993–2005) Spain, CENDEAC 2007. pp. 841. ISBN 978-84-96898-16-5
- Fernández (Tonel), Antonio Eligio. “Acotaciones al relevo (sobre las artes plásticas en Cuba 1986-1989)” (1992), published by Santana, Isaac Andrés (editor). Nosotros los más infieles. Narraciones críticas sobre el arte cubano (1993–2005) Spain, CENDEAC 2007. pp. 109, 200. ISBN 978-84-96898-16-5
- Medina, Cuauhtémoc. “Cubantown. Una diáspora estacionada en México”, published by Santana, Isaac Andrés (editor). Nosotros los más infieles. Narraciones críticas sobre el arte cubano (1993–2005) Spain, CENDEAC 2007. p. 157. ISBN 978-84-96898-16-5
- Sánchez, Osvaldo. “Utopía bajo el volcán. La Vanguardia cubana en México” (1992) published by Santana, Isaac Andrés (editor). Nosotros los más infieles. Narraciones críticas sobre el arte cubano (1993–2005) Spain, CENDEAC 2007. pp. 113, 114. ISBN 978-84-96898-16-5
- Gregory, Sholette; Stimson, Blake (editor). Collectivism after Modernism: the art of social imagination after 1945. Minneapolis: University of Minnesota Press, 2007, p. 99, 123, 132-135, 144, 156. ISBN 0816644624 ISBN 978-0816644629
- Power, Kevin; Espinoza, Magaly (editores). El Nuevo Arte Cubano: Antológica de textos críticos. California: Perceval Press, 2006. ISBN 097630094X ISBN 978-0976300946
- Camnitzer, Luis. New Art of Cuba. Revised Edition, Austin: University of Texas Press, 2003, pp. 188, 190, 194, 251-255, 282, 322, 328, 370. ISBN 978-0-292-70517-3.
- Batet, Janet. "¿En pos de una era cínica?". Lo que venga. Publicación de Artes Visuales, año 2, nº. 1, 1995, p. 16
- De la Nuez, Iván. “Arte cubano en los 90: los nuevos mapas y las viejas trampas”. Apuntes Posmodernos/Postmodern Notes, Fall, 1994, pp. 46, 48
- Cameron, Dan. “Cuba: Still Not Libre”. Art & Auction, marzo, 1994, pp. 89, 90
- Mosquera, Gerardo. Los hijos de Guillermo Tell, Poliéster, nº. 4, 1994, p. 23
- Izquierdo, Madeline. Las Razones del Poder, Proposiciones. Revista de la Fundación Pablo Milanés, nº. 1 1994, pp. 49, 50
- Murphy, Jay. “Artist on the Edge in Cuba”. Art Papers, Vol. 17, number 3, may/june, 1993 pp. 25–27
- Gilbert, Abel. Cuba de vuelta. El presente y el futuro de los hijos de la Revolución, Ed. Planeta Argentina, 1993, pp. 119–122. ISBN 9507423516 ISBN 978-9507423512
- Murphy, Jay.” Testing the Limits”. Art in America, october, 1992, pp. 65–67. ISSN 0004-3214
- Murphy, Jay (1992). "The young and restless in Habana". Third Text. 6 (20). Informa UK Limited: 115–132. doi:10.1080/09528829208576373. ISSN 0952-8822.
- Mosquera, Gerardo. "El nuevo arte de la Revolución", Unión. Revista de Literatura y Arte, nº. 13, 1991, p. 18
- Marisi, Luisa. "Nuevos curadores". El Caimán Barbudo magazine, April, Havana, 1990
