= Dume (disambiguation) =

Dume is a civil parish in northern Portugal.

Dume may also refer to:

== Places ==
- Dume district, an administrative unit in colonial Cameroon
- Dume River, a waterway in the Democratic Republic of Congo
- Point Dume, a promontory off the coast of California

== People ==
- Dumè (born 1981), French singer, composer and actor
- Dashnor Dume (born 1963), Albanian footballer and coach
- Herberto Dumé (born 1929), Cuban theatre director
- Margareta Dume (died 1410), Swedish heiress
- Petrit Dume (1920–1975), Albanian general and politician

=== Fictional ===
- Caleb Dume, a Jedi in the Star Wars universe
  - "DUME", an episode in the Star Wars Rebels TV series
- Turaga Dume, a fictional character in the Bionicle franchise produced by Lego

== See also ==
- Dan Dume, a local government area in Katsina State, Nigeria
- Dumes, a commune in the Landes department, Nouvelle-Aquitaine, France
