= Aimée Joaristi =

Cuban artist (born 1957)

- Born: Aimée Joaristi Argüelles; August 24, 1957 (age 68); Havana, Cuba
- Occupations: Interior designer, architect, and visual artist
- Years active: 2017–present
- Notable work: Tres cruces (2018), Manifiesto Púb(l)ico (2019)
- Movement: Expressionism
- Website: www.aimeejoaristi.com

Aimée Joaristi (born 24 August 1957) is a Spanish multi-disciplinary artist specialising in painting, videography, photography, and performance.

Joaristi's works have been featured in individual and group exhibitions. Her pieces are included in public and private collections in Cuba, Chile, Latvia, Spain, Costa Rica, France, Mexico and the United States.

== Early life and education ==
Joaristi was born in Havana, Cuba in 1957. Following the Cuban Revolution in 1959, she moved with her family to Miami, Florida when she was three years old. The family later moved to Madrid, Spain, where her paternal grandparents and maternal great-grandparents resided.

During her time in Madrid, Joaristi visited museums and galleries with her uncle and traveled throughout Europe with her parents. She developed an interest in the work of Salvador Dalí, which later influenced elements of surrealism in her own art. At 17, she began studying interior architecture in Madrid, and at 20, she started studying Graphic design at the Fashion Institute of Technology in New York City. She worked in the fashion industry in Milan and as an interior designer, later opening an architecture and interior design studio in Costa Rica.

In 2008, Joaristi began to focus exclusively on her art.

== Career ==
Joaristi's work is held in permanent collections at the Museo de Artes Decorativas y Diseño (Latvia), Arte Al Límite (Chile), Kendall Art Center (United States), Museo Wifredo Lam (Cuba), Museo La Neomudéjar (Spain), and Museo Zapadores (Spain).

=== Tres Cruces (2018) ===
Tres Cruces is a video installation complemented with painting and photography, combining traditional art and technology. It comprises three scenes or spaces that depict the gender violence surrounding this event, accompanied by video art showing the current crime scene.

Tres Curces addresses an event that occurred in Costa Rica on April 6, 1986, where seven women were raped and murdered after participating in a pilgrimage in La Cruz de Alajuelita. The criminal case of La Cruz de Alajuelita remains unresolved, and no one has been publicly prosecuted in connection with the crimes.

...The place was very close to me both because of its location in the Cerros de San Miguel of Escazú where I live, and because it is the destination for morning walks where I start my day. Without further ado, and in search of images (...) to articulate this project, I threw myself voraciously on the mountain, armed with a camera, a cane, and water. I went up without thinking about the effort. I only thought about the meaning I should give to this fact and how to "appropriate" a tragic moment, ruled by the pain of others, to translate that experience through the language of art.

(exhibited at the Museo C.A.V. La Neomudéjar in Madrid)

=== Manifesto Público (2019) ===
Many critics believe Manifesto Público to be reprimanding of machismo within society. With the aims of reducing gender inequality, this work reconstructs the image of women outside of socially patriarchal prejudices and stigmas. Public Manifesto is a work of space appropriation. Joaristi has stated that she seeks to de-sexualize and naturalize women's bodies. The depiction is not strictly realistic but serves as an explicit social reference to social issues. This work has been exhibited internationally and has received attention in countries including Cuba, Japan, Spain, Italy, Costa Rica, the United States, and South Africa.

== Awards and recognition ==
Joaristi received the International Emerging Artist Award (IEAA) in 2016 Contemporary Art Curator Magazine and the Artist of the Future Award in 2020. Her work was selected seven consecutive times for the Pop and Op Surrealism collection at the Saatchi Gallery (2013) and for foulards by Ostinelli Seta (2014). Commissioned works include "The End of the Beginning" (2015, Saatchi Gallery).

== Books ==
Joaristi's work is included in:

- Silencios y gritos (2015)
- The Best of 2016: International Emerging Artists (2016)
- Entre Siglos: Arte Contemporáneo de Centroamérica y Panamá (2016)
- Arte Al Límite (2017)
- The First Berliner Art Book (2017)
- Important World Artists (2017)
- Lenguaje Sucio (2019)
