= Gerardo Fernández =

Gerardo Fernández may refer to:

- Gerardo Fernández Albor (1917–2018), Spanish physician and politician
- Gerardo Fernández Fe (born 1971), Cuban novelist and essayist
- Gerardo Fernández Noroña (born 1960), Mexican sociologist and politician
- Gerardo Fernández (critic) (1941–2000), Uruguayan journalist and theatre critic, associated with Marcha (newspaper)
- Gerardo Fernández (cyclist) (born 1977), Argentine road racing cyclist
- Gerardo Fernández (weightlifter) (born 1953), Cuban weightlifter
