= Raúl Corrales Forno =

Raúl Corrales Fornos
- Born: January 29, 1925; Ciego de Ávila, Cuba
- Died: April 15, 2006 (aged 81); Cojímar, Havana
- Occupation: Photographer

Raúl Corrales Fornos (January 29, 1925 – April 15, 2006) was a Cuban photographer. Since 1961 he was member of the Photography Section of the Union de Escritores y Artistas de Cuba (UNEAC).

== Early life ==
Corrales was born to a poor family in Ciego de Ávila, in rural Cuba and moved to Havana as a child. He worked as a newspaper vendor, a shoeshine boy and a janitor, but his hobby of photography grew more and more serious.

== Politics ==
In the 1950s Corrales joined the Partido Socialista Popular and worked as a photographer for the Party's newspaper. He specialized in going to the remote parts of Cuba to photograph the everyday lives of poor peasants and workers. During a police raid in the late 1950s, almost all of Corrales photographic work was destroyed.

After the Revolution of 1959 against the Batista Government, Raúl Corrales joined the Communist Party of Cuba. He was one of Fidel Castro's official photographers for many years. Corrales worked for almost three decades in the Office of Historical Affairs, helping to preserve and organize the Castro government's documentary and photographic legacy.

== Individual exhibitions ==
He had many exhibitions of his work, such as 35 con la 35 at the Galería Habana in 1980. In 1985 his work was seen in Homenaje a Raúl Corrales at the Museo Nacional de Bellas Artes, Havana. In 1993 Visa pour l'Image. 5 Festival International du Photoreportage was seen at Perpignan, France. His photos were exhibited in 1998 in Raúl Corrales. Exposición Retrospectiva at the Fototeca de Cuba, Havana. In 2002 Raúl Corrales was shown at the Couturier Gallery, Los Angeles, California and the C. Grimaldis Gallery, Baltimore, Maryland.

== Collective exhibitions ==
He also formed part of many collective exhibitions: In 1966 Primera Muestra de la Cultura Cubana was seen at Pabellón Cuba, Havana. In 1978 some of his images were selected and presented in Hecho en Latinoamérica I, Primera Muestra de la Fotografía Latinoamericana Contemporánea at the Museo de Arte Moderno, Mexico. He was part of the exhibition Cuba Then and Now at the Gallery at 678, New York City, in 1998 and in 2002 Cuba 1960-2000. Sogno e realtá at the Italian Foundation for Photography, Turín, Italy.

== Awards ==
Corrales won the Premio Salón de Artes Plásticas, UNEAC in 1979. He was awarded the Premio de Fotografía Cubana 1982, Salón 23 y M, Hotel Habana Libre. In 1996 he was recognized with the National Prize Of Visual Arts, granted by the Ministerio de Cultura of Cuba.

== Collections ==
His work can be found in collections such as at the Centro Studi e Archivio della Comunicazione, Universidad de Parma, Italy; the Museum of Art, Fort Lauderdale, Florida; Kendall Art Center / The Rodriguez Collection, Miami, Florida; and the Ryanson College Gallery of Arts, Ottawa, Canada. In Cuba his work can be found in important collections: Casa de las Américas, Havana and Museo Nacional de Bellas Artes, Havana.

== Personal life ==
Corrales was survived by his wife Norma López Corrales, a daughter, and two sons. His granddaughter, Claudia Corrales, is an accomplished photographer, and works as a resource person for National Geographic Photographic Expeditions in Cuba.
