= Kendall Art Center =

Arts center in Kendall, Florida, U.S.

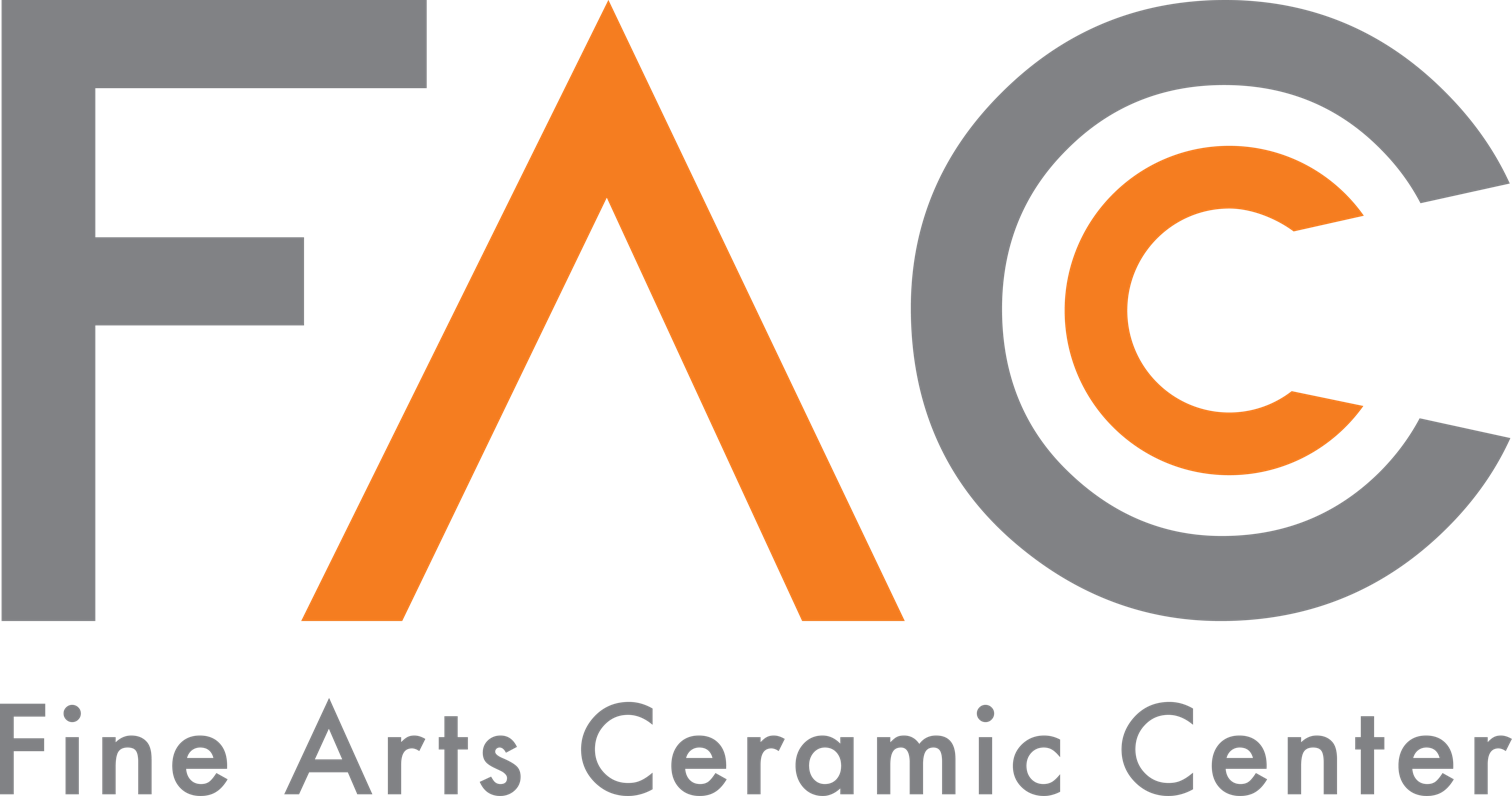

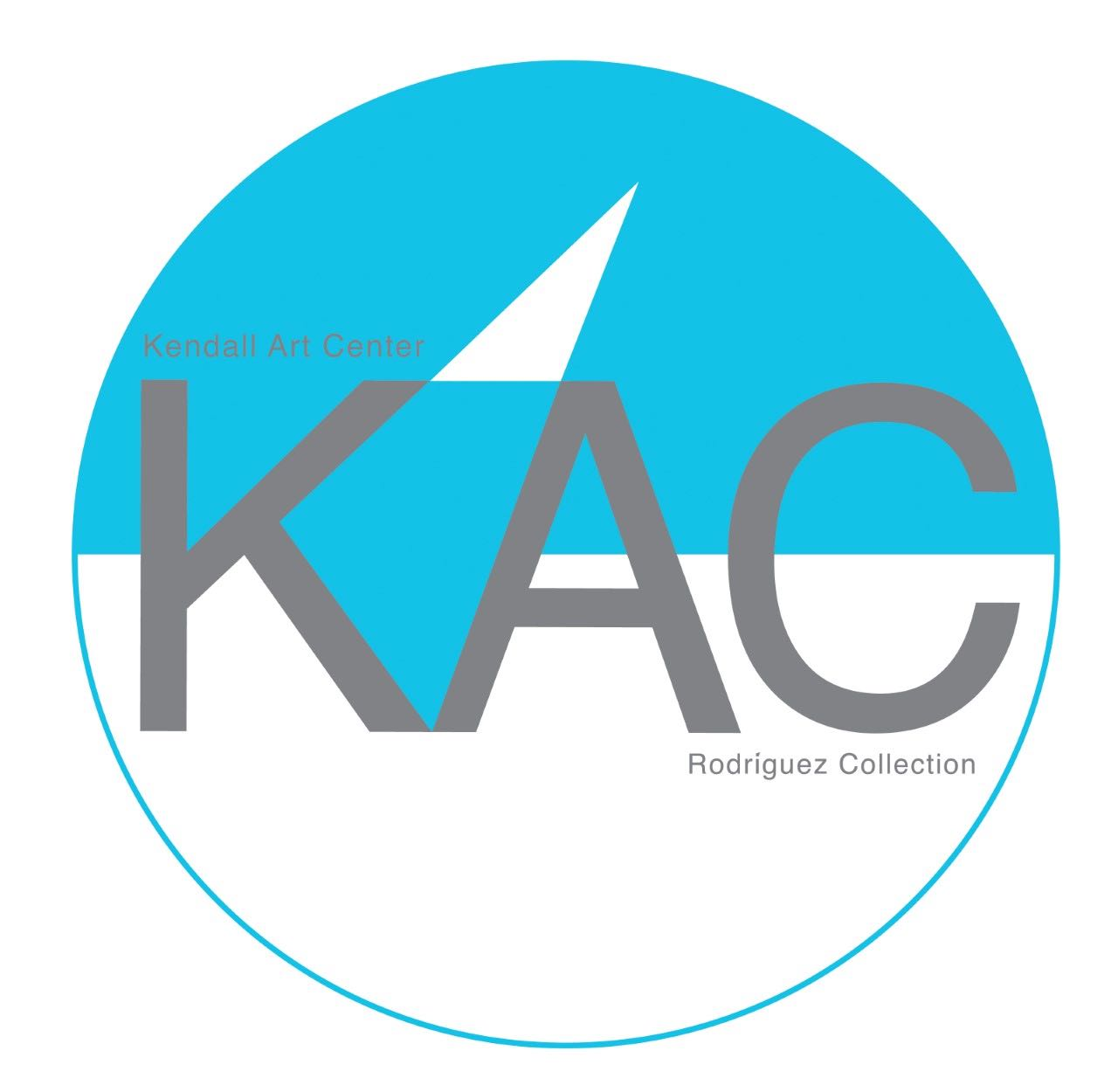
Kendall Art Center Type: Private Location: 12063 SW 131st Ave Miami, Fl

The Kendall Art Center is an arts center in Kendall, Miami-Dade County, Florida in the United States. It houses the Rodriguez Collection, owned by the Cuban-born American businessman Leonardo Rodríguez and his family.

== History ==
The center was opened in 2016, and has shown several personal and collective exhibitions by emerging and established artists. The Rodriguez Collection is a Cuban contemporary art collection owned by Rodriguez and his family. Rodriguez began buying and selling works of art during the late 20th century, and established his permanent collection in 1994. The collection aims to reflect significant artistic developments in contemporary Cuban art, as well as its development in the United States and abroad.

== Artists ==
- Ángel Acosta
- Gustavo Acosta
- Carlos Alfonzo
- Jairo Alfonso
- Néstor Arenas
- Pedro Ávila
- Luis Cruz Azaceta
- Henry Ballate
- José Bedia
- Cundo Bermúdez
- Marta María Pérez Bravo
- Adriano Buergo
- Ariel Cabrera
- Servando Cabrera
- Agustín Cárdenas
- Carlos Rodríguez Cárdenas
- Yoan Capote
- Ramón Carulla
- Consuelo Castañeda
- Humberto Castro
- Hugo Consuegra
- Raúl Corrales Forno
- Arturo Cuenca
- Ana Albertina Delgado
- Angel Delgado
- Maikel Domínguez
- Tomás Esson
- Carlos Estévez
- Ivonne Ferrer
- Joaquín Ferrer
- Guido Llinás
- Rogelio López Marín (Gory)
- Carlos Luna
- Manuel Mendive
- Aldo Menéndez
- José María Mijares
- Pedro Pablo Oliva
- Geandy Pavón
- Gina Pellón
- Aimee Perez
- René Portocarrero
- Ciro Quintana
- Lisyanet Rodríguez
- Mariano Rodríguez
- Reynerio Tamayo
- Rubén Torres Llorca
- José Villa
- Pedro Vizcaíno

== Exhibitions ==
Exhibitions at KAC include:

- Crossing Borders: Artists from the Middle East and Latin America, Group show.
- Seeds of Connection, Group show.
- WOMEN ARTISTS at MOAS, Group show.
- Fine Arts on a Plate, Group show.
- Off the Wall, exhibition by Mario Almaguer.
- Abstracto Continuo, Group show.
- Monumental, exhibition by Lia Galletti.
- Gina Pellón: "Dressed of Waters: The monumental proportions of a little piece", personal exhibition by Gina Pellón.
- Women Artists at KAC, Group show. Women Artists in the Rodriguez Collection
- RELATIVISMO DE PECADOS Y VIRTUDES, exhibition by Francisco Bernal.
- A SEER UNDER THE SKY OF AMIDA, exhibition by Ernesto Ferriol.
- ATRAMENTUM, exhibition by Miguel Angel Salvo.
- The Repeating Island: Contemporary art of the Caribbean, Group show.
- Manifiesto púbico, exhibition by Aimée Joaristi.
- CrossCurrents, Group show.
- SOFLO: New Art, Group show.
- Retratos en Chino: Aldo Menéndez, personal exhibition by Aldo Menéndez.
- Lágrimas negras, Group show.
- Resina Ámbar, personal exhibition by Zaida del Río.
- Eleven Lights Hidden in Plain Sight, Group show.
- Ciro Quintana: Land-Scape of the Cuban Art, personal exhibition by Ciro Quintana.
- Julio Figueroa Beltran: Midnight Passages, personal exhibition by Julio Figueroa Beltran.
- SOFLO: New Art, Nest and Ouroboros: Death Mask of the Fertile Crone, exhibition by Allison Kotzig.
- Fluorescent black, personal exhibition by Adrián Menéndez.
- 15 Hours, exhibition by Hernan Helfer.
- Contemporary Cuban Masters, Group show.
- Ivonne Ferrer: Art Attack, personal exhibition by Ivonne Ferrer.
- Change and Lusts, exhibition by Rubén.
- R10: Excavations of Memory, personal exhibition by Jorge Rodríguez Diez.
- SEX DESIGN METONYMY, Group show.
- Demons Inkpirations, personal exhibition by Vicente Dopico-Lerner.
- D FINE, Group show.
- As Long as the Sky: Artists and Friends in the Hamlet collection, Group show.
- 3 Concrete, Sandú Darié, Pedro de Oraá and Loló Soldevilla, Group show.
- Across Time: Cuban Abstractions, Pedro Avila, Pedro de Oraá, José Villa, Group show.
- Broken Roots: Aimee Perez," exhibition by Aimee Perez.
- Intersectionality: Angela Alés, exhibition by Angela Alés.
- Captivity Forces: Milena Martinez Pedrosa, exhibition by Milena Martinez Pedrosa.
- Full of Pollen, personal exhibition by Maikel Domínguez.
- The Pilgrim's Axioms, personal exhibition by Yourden Ricardo.
- American Rural Idylls, personal exhibition by Miguel Saludes.
- Echoes of Silence, personal exhibition by Alvaro Labañino.
- Unofficial, Group show.
- Dichotomous Structure, personal exhibition by Néstor Arenas.
- Fireworks, personal exhibition by Carlos Estévez.
- Roto-Náutica, personal exhibition by Adriano Buergo.
- Across Time: Cuban Artists from vanguardist to contemporaries, Group show.
- Ab-Out Serigrafía Artistica Cubana. Group show.
- Artists in Purgatory an exhibition of Jorge Reynardus Collection, Group show.
- Trans-Figuration an exhibition of Miami contemporary artist, Group show.
- Cuban Slugger, personal exhibition by Reynerio Tamayo.
- Crónicas de un artista cubano, personal exhibition by Ciro Quintana.
- Empty Space, personal exhibition by Jorge Lavoy.
- MIA Photography, Group show.
- Poems, an exhibition of female artists, Group show.
- Circulos de Fuego: Rings of Fire, personal exhibition by Rubén Torres Llorca.
- Diálogos Místicos, exhibition by José Bedia.
- Decoded, personal exhibition by Silvio Gaytón.
- After Chaos, personal exhibition by Dopico Lerner.
- Shared Secrets, personal exhibition by Pedro Avila Gendis.
- Beyond the Collector's Kabinet (Part II) Group show.
- Beyond the Collector's Kabinet (Part I) Group show.
