= Ángel Acosta León =

Cuban painter (1930–1964)

- Born: August 2, 1932; Havana, Cuba
- Died: 1964; Cuba
- Education: Academia Nacional de Bellas Artes San Alejandro
- Known for: Painting
- Style: Surrealist-inspired painting
- Movement: Surrealism
- Parents: Ángel Acosta Febles (father); Magdalena de León Hernández (mother)

Ángel Acosta León (1930–1964) was a Cuban painter. His style owes much to surrealism, and expresses the pain he felt through much of his life. Animal, human, and mechanical forms abound in his paintings, along with wheels, a reference to his lifelong fantasy of being a bus driver. His work has been compared to that of Wols.

== Biography ==
Leon was born on August 2, 1932, in the Buena Vista quarter of Havana, one of ten children of Angel Acosta Febles and Magdalena de Leon Hernandez. Leon attended the Catholic School for Poor Boys. In 1952, he entered the San Alejandro National School of Fine Arts, and graduated in 1958. Acosta's work can be found in many private collections around the world, and institutions such as the Kendall Art Center, Miami, Florida.
