= Ramón Alberto Carulla Trujillo =

Cuban artist

Ramón Antonio Carulla (born December 7, 1936, in Havana, Cuba) is a Cuban artist.

== Individual exhibitions ==
Among his personal exhibitions are:

- "Wall Series", Luckacs Gallery, Montreal, Canada, 1979.
- "Ramón Carulla". VI Bienal de San Juan del Grabado Latinoamericano, in San Juan, Puerto Rico, 1983.
- "Ramón Carulla. The Dreamers. Cuban Collection Fine Art", Coral Gables, Florida, U.S., 1988.

== Collective exhibitions ==
During his artistic life he took part in many collective exhibitions like "I Bienal de Artistas Noveles de Cuba". Centro de Arte Internacional, Havana, Cuba, 1965. He was included too in Drawing ’85"", 7th International Drawing Biennial. Middlesbrough Fine Arts Museum, Cleveland, Reino Unido, 1985. He was also one of the selected artists for "The Latin America Graphic Arts Biennial", Museum of Contemporary Hispanic Art (MOCHA), New York, U.S.A, 1986. That year he was also presented the 8 Norwegian International Print Biennale Fredrikstad 1986. Fredrikstad, Noruega, 8th International Exhibition of Graphic Art: Triennial of Graphic Art. Frechen, R.F.A. In 1995 he participated in The 3rd Sapporo International Biennial. Hokkaido Museum of Modern Art, Sapporo, Japan.

== Awards ==
He has been awarded on many occasions during his artistic life, one of these was the Cintas Foundation Fellowship, New York, U.S.A, 1973/1979. In 1980 he won the Simon Daro Daridowicz Painting Award. Metropolitan Museum & Art Center, Coral Gables, Florida, U.S.A. In 1988 he was awarded the Prize VI Bienal de San Juan del Grabado Latinoamericano y del Caribe, San Juan, Puerto Rico. In this year he also received the Prize in the 8th Mini Print Internacional de Cadaqués 1988, Taller Galería Fort, Cadaqués, Barcelona, Spain.

== Collections ==
Many of his pieces are included in collections all over the world, some of them are at: International Center for Contemporary Art, Paris, France - Cincinnati Art Museum, Ohio, United States - City Art Gallery, Lodz, Poland - Velez-Malaga Museum, Spain - Cuban Museum of Art and Culture - Detroit Institute of Arts, Michigan, United States - Florean Museum, Maramures, Rumania - Domecq Cultural Institute, Mexico City, Mexico - Japan Print Association Collection, Tokio, Japon - Jose Luis Cuevas Museum, Mexico City, Mexico - National Museum of Engraving, Buenos Aires, Argentina - Rubino Tamayo Museum, Mexico City, Mexico - Museum of Art, Fort Lauderdale, Florida - Kendall Art Center / The Rodriguez Collection, Miami, Florida - Museum of Contemporary Art, Brazil - Museum of Fine Arts, Montreal, Canada - Museum of Modern Art of Latin America, United States - National Art Center, Giza, Egypt
