= Gerardo Fernández Fe =

Cuban novelist and essayist

- Born: January 15, 1971 (age 55); Havana, Cuba
- Occupation: Novelist
- Writing career
- Language: Spanish
- Genre: Literary fiction

Gerardo Fernandez Fe (Havana, January 15, 1971) is a Cuban novelist and essayist. His best-known works are the novels La Falacia (1999) and El último día del estornino (2011) and the books of essays Cuerpo a diario (2007) and Notas al total (2015).

His poems, written between 1990 and 2001, were compiled in Tibisial (2017).

In 2018, his essay Moleskine Sergio Pitol was published in Mexico. José Kozer: tajante y definitivo, an extensive interview with the laureate Cuban poet, was published in 2020.

Fernandez self-published his novel Hotel Singapur on Amazon in January 2021.

== History ==
Fernandez Fe graduated of French Language at University of Havana in 1995. He has worked as translator and professor of French in Cuba and in Ecuador. He has translated into Spanish the works of Roland Barthes, Gilles Deleuze, Antonin Artaud, Emil Cioran and Denis Roche, among others authors.

In 1990, with 19 years, he won the poetry prize Luis Rogelio Nogueras in Havana with his first book El llanto del escriba, published two years afterwards. It was followed by Relicarios (1994) and Las palabras pedestres (1996). The latter won the David prize of poetry of the previous year.

Fernandez Fe wrote his first novella, La Falacia, in 1996. "A work of deep anxiety and odd maturity… (…)", according to the Cuban writer and Leonardo Padura."It is an indisputable sign that a new narrator has born in Cuba (…).”. The novella received an honorable mention in the Contest Italo Calvino, of which Padura was one of the jurors.

The book of essay Cuerpo a diario (2007) is a curious panorama on diaries written in extreme situations like war, illness or living in totalitarian states.

In the 2011 he published El último día del estornino. For the critic Jeff Lawrence, this book marks "the insertion of Fernández Fe in an important current of contemporary Latin American writers like Ricardo Piglia, Roberto Bolaño, and Juan Villoro".

Rafael Rojas thinks that in this novel there is "a multiple invention of writing, text, authorship and reader, trying to destabilize the poetic traditions of the Cuban literature of the last half century"

Fernandez Fe lives in the United States since 2013.

Of his book Notas al total, published in 2015, the Cuban critic Gilberto Padilla Cárdenas has said: "Notas al total was probably the best book published by a Cuban writer in the year 2015. GFF Is in the Hall of the Fame of the Cuban essay (...) While the others age, GFF rejuvenates with a literature (...) that reads like a battle of other genres -journalism, history, testimony, etc.- against the nirvana of the traditional forms."

In the prologue of Hotel Singapur (2021), Cuban novelist Abilio Estévez says that the novel "highlights what La Falacia and El último día del estornino seemed to make quite clear: Gerardo Fernández Fe is already one of the essential Cuban writers born after 1959".

Fernández Fe has published on Letras Libres, Cuadernos Hispanoamericanos, Hypermedia Magazine, Diario de Cuba, and El Nuevo Herald, among others.

== Books published ==
- Hotel Singapur, (novel) Audere Libros, 2021
- José Kozer: tajante y definitivo (interview), Editorial Rialta, Mexico, 2020
- Moleskine Sergio Pitol (essay), Editorial Rialta, Mexico, 2018
- Tibisial (poetry compilation), Editorial Rialta, Mexico, 2017
- Notas al total (essays, interviews, chronicles) Publishing House Bokeh, Leiden, Netherlands, 2015.
- El último día del estornino (novel) Editorial Viento Sur, Madrid, Spain, 2011.
- Cuerpo a diario (essay), Tse-tsé ediciones, Buenos Aires, Argentina, 2007 and Publishing Association Hypermedia, Madrid, 2014.
- La Falacia (novella), Ediciones UNION, Havana, 1999, and Bokeh, Antwerp, Belgium, 2012.
- Las palabras pedestres (poetry), ediciones UNION, Havana, 1996.
- El llanto del escriba, (poetry), Ediciones Extramuros, Havana, 1992.

== Distinctions ==
- Honorable mention in the Contest Juan Rulfo of Essays 2002, sponsored by Radio France Internationale (RFI) for the essay Un escritor de novelas llamado Roland Bathes (A writer of novels called Roland Barthes)
- La Falacia (The fallacy) was awarded with an honorable mention in the Contest Italo Calvino, sponsored by Cuba's Union of Writers and Arci Nuova Associazione, of Italy, in 1997.
- Poetry prize of the magazine La Gaceta de Cuba, 1997.
- David prize of poetry, Havana, 1995, for Las palabras pedestres (The pedestrian words).
- Poetry prize Luis Rogelio Nogueras, Havana, 1990, for El llanto del escriba (The crying of the scribe)
