= Abelardo Estorino =

Cuban dramatist and director

- Born: Abelardo José Estorino López; 29 January 1925; Unión de Reyes, Cuba
- Died: 22 November 2013 (aged 88); Havana, Cuba
- Education: University of Havana
- Occupations: Dramatist, director, critic
- Partner: Raúl Martínez
- Awards: National Prize for Literature (1992); ACE Award (1997); National Prize for Theater (2002)

Abelardo José Estorino López (29 January 1925 – 22 November 2013) was a Cuban dramatist, director, and theater critic.

== Biography ==
Abelardo Estorino was born in Unión de Reyes on 29 January 1925. After Bachillerato studies in Matanzas, he trained as a dental surgeon and practiced as such for three years (1954–1957), dividing time between the job and his literary vocation. He wrote his first play, Hay un muerto en la calle, in 1954. It remains unpublished. The success of his second dramatic work, El peine y el espejo, written in 1956 but released in 1960, placed him firmly in the world of literature and drama.

After studying stage direction at the Teatro Estudio de Cuba and working with Julio Matas and Herberto Dumé, it was the 1960s that marked the growth and direction of his work. El robo del cochino (1961) and La casa vieja (1964) were his most notable plays from this period. He also adapted works for the theater, such as El mago de Oz (The Wizard of Oz), El fantasmita, La dama de las camelias (La Dame aux Camélias) (1968), and Las impuras by Miguel de Carrión. In that decade Estorino traveled to the Soviet Union and Czechoslovakia, joined the National Council of Culture, and participated in the First National Congress of Writers and Artists of Cuba. During this time he received the first recognitions of his long career, such as mentions for the Casa de las Américas Prize for El robo del cochino and La casa vieja, the latter for the production directed by Berta Martínez. He continued the decade with Los mangos de Caín (1965) and El tiempo de la plaga, in addition to the comedy Las vacas gordas.

Estorino was the life partner of artist Raúl Martínez. In the 1970s, in spite of the marginalization that he suffered, like other intellectuals, due to his homosexuality, he did not stop writing. After directing an adaptation of Lope de Vega's La discreta enamorada, he wrote La dolorosa historia del amor secreto de Don José Jacinto Milanés, a literary work that required him to do complex research into Spanish colonial Cuba. At this point his output constituted an intimate journey through the intricacies of the human being as part, for good and for bad, of that social structure that is the family, the core on which Estorino focuses to look at the reality of society as a whole. This explains why many of his plays were successfully performed in theaters in Europe (Norway, Sweden, Spain) and the Americas (United States, Chile, Venezuela). In the 1980s, his works included Ni un sí ni un no, Pachencho vivo o muerto, Que el diablo te acompañe (1987), Las penas saben nadar (1989), and Morir del cuento, whose production was awarded in Spain, at the Theater Festival of Havana, and by the National Union of Writers and Artists of Cuba.

Abelardo Estorino died in Havana on 22 November 2013.

== Works ==
- 1956: Hay un muerto en la calle (unpublished)
- 1956: El peine y el espejo
- 1960: Premiere of El peine y el espejo under the direction of Herberto Dumé
- 1961: Premiere of El robo de cochino under the direction of Herberto Dumé
- 1962: Wrote and premiered the musical comedy Las vacas gordas and Las impuras, an adaptation of the novel by Miguel de Carrión
- 1964: Wrote and premiered La casa vieja at Teatro Estudio under the direction of Berta Martínez
- 1965: Magaly Alabau directed his play Los mangos de Caín
- 1967: Directed La ronda de Schnitzler, together with Raquel Revuelta
- 1968: Wrote puppet theater versions of El tiempo de la plaga and La dama de las camelias (La Dame aux Camélias)
- 1972: Directed La discreta enamorada by Lope de Vega
- 1973: Wrote La dolorosa historia del amor secreto de Don José Jacinto Milanés
- 1975: Directed Los pequeños burgueses (The Petty Bourgeois) by Maxim Gorky
- 1979: Directed Casa de muñecas (A Doll's House) by Henrik Ibsen
- 1980: Wrote and directed Ni un si ni un no
- 1981: Directed Aire frío by Virgilio Piñera
- 1982: Wrote Pachencho vivo o muerto, premiered at the Musical Theater of Havana
- 1983: Wrote and directed Morir del cuento
- 1984: Anthology Teatro published
- 1985: Roberto Blanco premiered his play La dolorosa historia del amor secreto de Don José Jacinto Milanés
- 1986: Directed La verdadera culpa de Juan Clemente Zenea by Abilio Estévez
- 1987: Wrote Que el diablo te acompañe
- 1988: Directed La Malasangre by Griselda Gambaro
- 1990: Directed Aristodemo by Joaquín Lorenzo Luaces
- 1992: Premiered Vagos rumores
- 1994: Premiered Parece blanca
- 1995: Vagos rumores and Las penas saben nadar performed at the Cádiz Ibero-American Theater Festival
- 1996: Vagos rumores and Las penas saben nadar performed at the Repertorio Español in New York
- 1997: Parece blanca performed at the Caracas International Festival
- 1997: Directed the premiere of Medea by Reinaldo Montero
- 1998: Vagos rumores and Parece blanca performed at the Repertorio Español in New York
- 1999: Anthology Vagos rumores y otras obras published
- 2000: Las penas saben nadar performed at the Bogotá Ibero-American Theater Festival
- 2000: Premiered El baile at the Sala Hubert de Blanck in Havana
- 2000: The text El baile released by publishing house Alarcos
- 2000: Premiere of El baile at the Repertorio Español in New York
- 2001: Las penas saben nadar performed at the First Festival Internacional del Monólogo in Miami

== Awards and recognitions ==
- 1961: Mention for the Casa de las Américas Prize for El robo de cochino
- 1964: Mention for the Casa de las Américas Prize for La casa vieja
- 1984: Award for Best Production at the Theater Festival of Havana for Morir del cuento
- 1984: Literary Critics' Award for Teatro
- 1985: Special mention for the Cau Ferrat Award at the Sitges Film Festival for Morir del cuento
- 1989: Segismundo Award for Best Text at the Festival del Monólogo for Las penas saben nadar
- 1992: National Prize for Literature
- 1996: Literary Critics' Award for Vagos rumores
- 1997: ACE Award for Best Direction for Vagos rumores
- 1997: Guggenheim Fellowship for Drama and Performance Art
- 1999: Critics' Award for the editing of Vagos rumores y otras obras
- 2000: HOLA Award for Best Direction for El baile
- 2000: Theatre Communications Group fellowship for the premiere of El baile and Parece blanca in New York
- 2002: National Prize for Theater
- 2006: Inducted into the Academia Cubana de la Lengua
