= Ofill Echevarria =

Cuban-born painter (born 1972)

- Born: March 30, 1972 (age 54); Havana, Cuba
- Education: Elementary School of Fine Arts “20 de Octubre”; San Alejandro Academy of Fine Arts; San Alejandro Academy of Fine Arts
- Known for: Painting; multimedia art
- Notable work: El Mundo de Los Vivos / The Real World (2013)
- Style: Contemporary art

Ofill Echevarria (born 1972) is a Cuban-born painter and multimedia artist based in New York City.

== Biography ==
Ofill graduated from the Elementary School of Fine Arts '20 de Octubre' in 1986 and from the San Alejandro Academy of Fine Arts in 1991. As a founder member of the controversially famous Havanan art collective, Arte Calle (1986-1988) becomes part of the Cuban art scene of the late eighties.

In 1991, he traveled to Mexico City to pursue an art scholarship, where he lived for ten years. In 2002, represented by the renowned Praxis International Art - Mexico, which later became the Alfredo Ginocchio Gallery, both in Mexico City, Ofill moved to Miami. In 2005, he moved to New York City, where he currently lives and works.

Since 2001, Ofill has exhibited his work widely throughout Latin America, the United States of America and Europe; both individually and participating in many international art fairs and group shows. His work are part of major public and private collections, among which are: Museo Nacional de Bellas Artes de La Habana; Museo Nacional de Arte de Mexico; Museum of Latin American Art; Frederick R. Weisman Art Foundation; Carnegie Art Museum (Oxnard, California); American Museum of the Cuban Diaspora.

In 2013, he launched his book 'El Mundo de Los Vivos I The Real World', which contains several essays from recognized American and Cuban art experts and includes artworks from 2001 to 2012.

== Work ==
Ofill Echevarria's fascination with motion in cityscapes has its origins while the artist was still living in Mexico City, where he developed a series of oil paintings on canvas regarding urban life that later was exhibited at the Multicultural Center of the URI, Kingston.

In 2002, a more specific series of paintings about life in the city and its inhabitants with regard on the business people was exhibited in his, 'Iconos / Reflections', as well as in 'City Escapes' (2004) this iconography of stress becomes sharper, with pictures as 'Soñar Is Forbidden' or 'Ritual de Identidad / The Lost Identity'; "works that bordered on abstraction, and whose titles, often bilingual, alluded in a parallel way to another multitudinous movement: that of the human masses coming from the south to insert themselves in the megalopolises of the north".

Ofill Echevarria's style and technique draws from the tradition of photography, documentary film and painting. Additionally, particularly in those works where motion matters, the artist has been pointed as an exponent of Wet-on-wet painting technique.

In 2013, Ofill returns to Mexico with 'Momentum', an exhibition in which "the pace of city life could only be trapped by the fragments that constitute its temporality through a diligent observation". A more abstract series of paintings on urban life "defined by brushwork" was unveiled at the Gabarron Foundation New York in September of the same year. The show included several Pictures-In-Motion about the city of New York, a project that has been part of the artist's pictorial exhibitions since 2011, although it was officially presented throughout 2013.
