= Gina Pellón =

Cuban painter (1926–2014)

- Born: December 26, 1926; Cumanayagua, Cienfuegos, Cuba
- Died: March 27, 2014 (aged 87); Paris, France
- Known for: Painting
- Movement: Abstract Art

Gina Pellón (December 26, 1926 – March 27, 2014) was a Cuban painter who lived in France. She was known for her abstract expressive paintings in strong colours, usually depicting women. She also wrote collections of poems.

== Life ==
Born in Cumanayagua, Las Villas she graduated from the Academy of San Alejandro in 1954, and taught at the Velado Polytechnic Institute, until 1957. In 1959, she studied in France, and overstayed her visa, fleeing from the Cuban dictatorship of Fidel Castro, and in 1960 she made her first solo exhibition in Luzern, Switzerland. Throughout her career, she received several awards such as, the Medal of the City of Cholet (France, 1961), Order of Arts and Letters (France, 1978), and the Cintas Foundation Fellowship (New York, 1978), among others. Her work has been exhibited in several solo and group exhibitions at galleries and museums in Venice, Miami, Silkeborg (Denmark), Paris, Copenhagen, Nantes, Amsterdam, Toulouse, Trodheim (Norway), Caracas, and Lausanne (Switzerland), among other cities. Gina Pellón work can be found in many private collections around the world, and institutions such as the Kendall Art Center / The Rodriguez Collection, Miami, Florida.

She lived in Paris where she became involved with the COBRA group.

Pellón remained in Paris for the rest of her life. She died on March 27, 2014.

== Literature ==
- Gina Pellon: Peintures 1965-1999, Edizioni Ae dell'aurora, Verona, Italia, 1999 / M. Wheatley, Marie Claire Anthonioz.
- Gina Pellon, Galerie Moderne, 2001, Silkeborg, Denmark.
- Gina Pellon, Galerie Moderne, 2006, Silkeborg, Denmark.
- Navarrete, William: Visión Crítica de Gina Pellón, Aduana Vieja, Valencia, 2007.
- Navarrete, William. (Ed.) “Insulas al pairo : poesía cubana contemporánea en París”, Gina Pellón, Aduana Vieja, Cádiz, 2004.
- Navarrete, William. (Ed.) “Vendedor de olvidos”, Gina Pellón., Editorial Aduana Vieja, Cádiz, 2005.
- Pellón, Gina. “Rétrospective”, Musées de la ville de Niort, Niort, 1999.
- Pellón, Gina. “Cuando los pájaros duermen” Editorial Cernuda, Miami, Fla., 1985.
- Ballate, Henry. "Dressed of Waters: The monumental proportions of a little piece", Rodriguez Collection, Miami, Florida, 2020.
