= Yoan Capote =

Cuban sculptor (born 1977)

Yoan Capote is a Cuban sculptor who was born in 1977 in Pinar del Río. He received the UNESCO prize during the 7th Havana Biennial with the artists' collective DUPP (Desde Una Pragmática Pedagógica).

== Biography ==
Yoan Capote lives and works in Havana where he studied arts at the Superior Institute of Art from 1991 to 1995. Even if he first specialized in painting, he finally decided to improve his sculpture skills, considering the latter as a way of developing three-dimensional and multi-sensory possibilities. He is already recognized in the Cuban art circles - as a promising artist. His work, known to be “solid”, “irreverent”, “provocative”, and “non-conformist” – according to some art critics – deals principally with interactions between individuals and his psychological experiences. Several of his pieces often merges human organs with inanimate objects, rearranges the human body and reinvents the purpose of everyday life objects: the sculpture Nostalgia, which features an ordinary suitcase unzipped to reveal a wall of bricks, can be seen as a metaphor for nomadism and its limits, the wall of bricks standing for our own impediments we all carry with us wherever we go.

Yoan Capote follows the line of many other internationally known artists, working at the same time with different medias and genres (painting, photography, performance sculptures and installations). One of his works entitled Open Mind 2006 is a labyrinth based on the drawing of the human brain where people can walk. People become metaphors for neurons transmitting information as they walk around the maze. This work inspires reflection on the interrelation among persons, who attempt to coexist with each other. Yoan Capote work can be found in many private collections around the world, and institutions such as the Kendall Art Center / The Rodriguez Collection, Miami, Florida.

== Exhibitions ==
Collectives exhibitions

- 2011 : LʼInsoutenable Légèreté de lʼêtre (The Unbearable Lightness of Being), Yvon Lambert Gallery, NY
- 2009 : PANAMERICANA, Galeria Kurimanzutto, Mexico City
- 2009 : 10th edition of Havana Biennial, Havana
- 2008 : Surrounded by Water : Expressions of Freedom and Isolation in Contemporary Cuban Art - Boston University Art Gallery - BUAG, Boston, MA
- 2006 : Waiting List : Time and transition in Cuban Contemporary Art - City Art Museum Ljubljana - Mestna Galerija 1, Ljubljana Group Show - George Adams Gallery, New York, NY
- 2005 : The Nature of Things : Works on Paper by Yoan Capote, Valerie Demianchuk, William T. Wiley - George Adams Gallery, New York, NY Body Language - George Adams Gallery, New York, NY
- 2004 : New Installations, Artists in Residence - Cuba - The Mattress Factory, Pittsburgh, PA BUSH-WHACK! - George Adams Gallery, New York, NY
- 2003 : 8th edition of Havana Biennial, Havana
- 2000 : 7th edition of Havana Biennial, Havana

== Individual exhibitions ==
- 2010 : Mental States - Jack Shainman Gallery, New York, NY
- 2008 : Psicomorfosis - Galería Habana, Havana
- 2004 : Animica - George Adams Gallery, New York, NY
