= Juan Ballester Carmenates =

Cuban painter

Juan Pablo Ballester
- Born: September 16, 1966 (age 60); Camagüey, Cuba

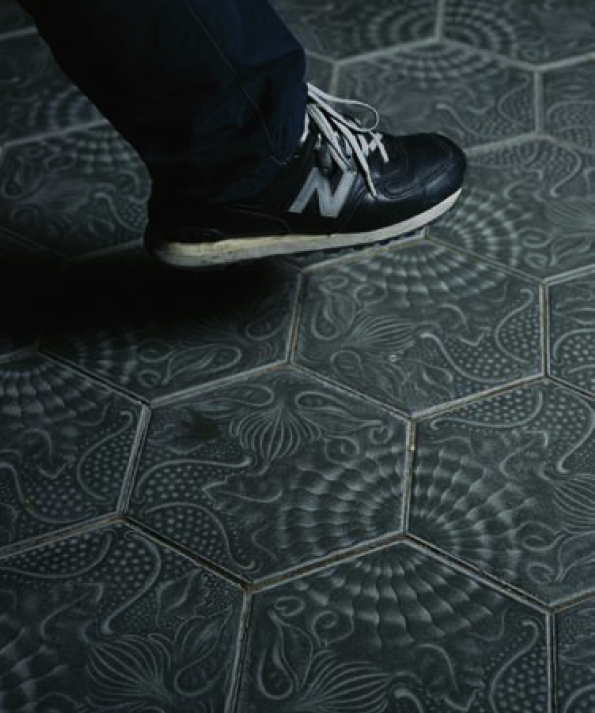
Juan Pablo Ballester. S. T. (En ningún lugar) (Nowhere), 2002

Juan Pablo Ballester (born September 16, 1966, in Camagüey, Cuba) is a Cuban-born artist who works mainly with photography and video art, although he has also worked with installations and performance art. He has also developed activities as a curator, assistant curator and cultural manager.

Juan Pablo Ballester graduated in 1990 from the Instituto Superior de Arte (ISA) in Havana, Cuba, and was member of the artistic group Grupo ABTV from 1988 to 1991. In 1992 he left Cuba and went into exile in Spain. (Note: In the mid-1980s the Cuban Revolution was going through an ideological crisis that led to a process of reforms "against corruption and crime" that Fidel called Rectificación de errores y tendencias negativas (Rectification of Errors and Negative Trends Campaign). In 1989 Mikhail Gorbachev visited Cuba to report that Soviet Union could not continue to fulfill its economic commitments to Cuba as a result of its reform process called Perestroika. During this period of ideological and economic crisis several artistic projects were censored in Cuba between 1988 and 1989, including the Grupo ABTV (ABTV Group) exhibition Homage to Hans Haacke at the Castillo de la Fuerza Project. Despite this internal atmosphere of censorship and prohibitions, the Ministry of Culture changed its international promotion policy for the visual arts, the change would allow any artist with a letter of invitation to carry out a project abroad could leave the country without having to go through the strict common control mechanisms. The change in the Ministry of Culture made it possible for many young critical artists to leave the country and many, disappointed with the new environment of censorship and the imminence of a great economic crisis that the government would call "Período especial" (Special Period), took advantage of the opening to exile themselves.) In 1995 he co-organized the event and curated the exhibition Cuba: La Isla Posible (Cuba: The Possible Island), the first multidisciplinary event that brought together Cuban artists, writers and intellectuals from the island and exile to debate the future of Cuban Culture, Centre de Cultura Contemporània de Barcelona (CCCB), Barcelona, Spain. He was a recipient of Cintas Fellow 1998–99. Since 2011 he lives in Miami.

== Career ==
In his formative years, Juan Pablo Ballester trained within the ironic tactics to dismantle the official representations of national identity that the so-called Renaissance of the visual arts used to redefine the parameters of "revolutionary" art in Havana in the late 1980s. During his student years in the Fine Arts Faculty of the Instituto Superior de Arte in Havana, he developed well-known projects among which are El que imita fracasa (He Who Imitates Fails), 1988 (with Ileana Villazón); "Nosotros": Exposición Antológica de la obra de Raúl Martínez ("We": An Anthological Exhibition of the Work of Raúl Martínez), 1989 (with Grupo ABTV), and Homenaje to Hans Haacke (Homage to Hans Haacke), 1989 (with Grupo ABTV), an exhibition that despite having been censored by the Cuban authorities hours before its opening, still circulates among the island's artists as a legend. (Note: Grupo ABTV "Homage to Hans Haacke’... was announced as an ideological operation worthy of Haacke. The extreme critical acuity towards institutions and representation – cynical, burlesque, terrible – of not a few inconsistencies between art and status, between art and merchandise, between art and politics; It seemed to be more than what the aforementioned institutions could allow. The tribute to Haacke – what a paradox, precisely to him! - never got to opened. The pieces resorted to parody effects, especially promotional manipulation was parodied. The important thing was to accuse the institutional mechanism (commercial or political) that corrupted the semantic nature of the work (…) Even though it has not was opened, Homage to Hans Haacke is one of the key exhibitions of the 1980s in Cuba; and not precisely for the reasons that determined its cancellation. Whoever likes it, the Cuban visual art from 90’s will have it as a paradigm”. Sánchez, Osvaldo (1990). "Acciones de Toirac—Tanya y Ballester—Villazón" (in Spanish, German). Supplement to the catalog Kuba o.k. Düsseldorf: Städtische Kunsthalle Düsseldorf.)

In his first years in Madrid, Ballester experienced the difficult experience of emigration and the need for integration, at the same time that he came into contact with the exotic tropical that surrounds the Spanish and European vision of his birthplace. During these years Ballester began working on a series of photographs documenting an ephemeral performance event about his identity, for which he used strategies such as appropriation, collage, manipulation and the use of the artist's body as a visual symbol. In his approach to photography Ballester does not undertake a critique of modernity and its foundations of unity and originality, but rather deconstructs the social rites behind the images, he distances himself from Cartier-Bresson's "decisive moment" to break the opacity of the historical narratives that take photography as proof of plausibility and social product. (Note: “Since 1992 Ballester has produced, on his own, images that reject the documentary style that dominated Cuban photographic ideologies after the Revolution. Drawing on such strategies as appropriation, collage, and manipulation; the use of the artist’s studio as symbolic space; the conversion of the artist’s body into a visual symbol; repudiation of the Cartier-Bresson ‘decisive moment;’ and the use of photographs as a record of performances, Ballester and other Cuban artists developed an alternative set of photographic practices. They rejected the view of ‘reality’ as modeled by compositional, expressive, and ideological clichés. Instead, they proposed an intimate vision that substitutes or deconstructs reality—a deliberate erosion stimulated, in part, by the social devaluation of graphic journalism and press photography in Cuba, which were supplanted by the repetitive use of stock photos and stereotypical images (…) Ballester does not undertake a critique of modernity and its foundations of unity and originality, but instead deconstructs the social rites behind the images. His intention is to rupture the opacity of historical narratives that take photography as proof of verisimilitude and as a product for social consumption (…) But if Sherman exposed the construct of ‘the feminine’ in mass media, the frozen performance of the Cuban artist pointed to the re-appropriation of an historical event, which we could only see through the mediation of images broadcast by the mass media. The sacrifice of the anonymous fighter has been submitted to the violence of the spectacle, a component of any contemporary historical discourse that aspires to legitimate its myths and its forgetfulness”. Mena Chicuri, Abelardo. "About Juan Pablo Ballester", The Farber Collection. Cuba Avant-Garde Contemporary Cuban Art .)

For Spanish critics and curators Juan Vicente Aliága and Mar Villaespesa, “Ballester's photographs taken in the 90s have been developed together with his subject (from the first one that refers to the insularity of Cuba and its social situation until its representation of the contingent subject) while at the same time exploring different crossroads, such as the condition of exile and sexual identity; crossroads between the public and the private, between the subject subject and the social self. The experiences reflected in his photographs refer to complex formulations that mix the physical, the biographical and the intimate but placing special emphasis on the sexed nature of all actions and on the consideration that even the most private aspect has a political or ideological interpretation".

In 1994 he moved to Barcelona, where his experience of emigration would intensify when he was confronted with a society engaged in the search, construction and reaffirmation of an National identity encouraged from within government structures to differentiate itself from the Spanish state and the European context in which it finds itself submerged. Two large series of works are due to this time under the name Basado en hechos reales (Based on real events) and Enlloc, a Catalan language word that can be translated as Nowhere.

During his years in Barcelona, Ballester carefully examined the institutional and aesthetic means by which a monolithic Catalan nationalism is communicated. In these works, Ballester reveals the iconography of internal, external Catalans and Xarnegos as fundamental to the visual definition of national identity that is supported by a variety of photographic genres, from advertising to postcards of monuments and snapshots of tourists. Ballester also used casting models from advertising agencies dressed as Mossos d'Esquadra (local police) as a fashion report in landscape settings – idyllic and idealized – prototypical of Catalan Noucentisme painting but using techniques that are common to many neo-objectivist photographers: long shots and centered camera positions, geometric composition, occasional subjects, as well as the symbolic load of the spaces chosen to transmit multiple layers of meaning.

In these photographs Ballester addresses topics such as the (re) construction of identity, the temptation of the ethnographic, fictionalizations and historical patrimonializations, the invention of traditions, the resemantization and idealization of the common imaginary, or the exoticization and exoticism, it configures a framework of thought that clearly makes it impossible to read an image as a simple retinal effect alone. His photographic series are fictional devices that do not demand a viewer as an author but a viewer as a producer of meaning. (Note: Catalan art critic and curator Manel Clot on the work of Juan Pablo Ballester: "If the operational complexity, the perverse investment and the resentization of the desire for all procedural transversality required representation as a discipline strictly associated with a media economy, this image would undoubtedly be its image: the image. As an inverted re-reading of the topics of an identity of welcome and, therefore, not its own, staged in the most representative of the landscape and pictorial fullness of the late nineteenth century, deliberately adjusted to the delusions and mechanisms of the construction of the contemporary story, and clearly tricky in the figurative materialization of sexualizable fantasies, unattainable desires and adolescent dreams, the powerful fictional device that the artist sets in motion connects, in addition, previous stages of his I work with budding operational prospects. Nowhere, everywhere". Manel Clot, Juan Pablo Ballester ST (Enlloc), Suite Magazine, no 24, March 2004 (Barcelona), p. 38)

“The result of this display of variety is a rhetorical stress on the role of photography in the taxonomic evaluation of a given territory and its people. Ballester is not attempting to engage the sympathies of viewers toward his band of outsiders – he addresses the question of inclusion at another level, in a far more analytic manner. His work speaks from an outsider’s point of view, but does not cry out 'see me', but rather, 'see yourselves and what you look for.” Coco Fusco

== Selected solo exhibitions ==
NoWhere (2013), Farside Gallery, Miami, FL; Enlloc (2005), Museo Pablo Serrano. Instituto Aragones de Arte y Cultura Contemporáneo (IACC), Zaragoza, Spain; Enlloc (2004), Galería La Fábrica, PHotoEspaña 2004, Madrid, Spain; Enlloc (2004) Galería Tomás March, Valencia, Spain; Enlloc (2003) Galería Antonio de Barnola, Barcelona, Spain; En ningún lugar (2002), Centro Andaluz de Arte Contemporáneo (CAAC), Seville, Spain; Basado en hechos reales (1998), Galería Marta Cervera, Madrid, Spain; ¡Juntos y Adelante!. Arte, Política y Voluntad de Representación (1991), with Grupo ABTV, Collateral exhibition to the IV Bienal de La Habana, Casa del Joven Creador, Havana, Cuba; Homenaje a Hans Haacke (1989), with Grupo ABTV, Castillo de la Real Fuerza, Havana, Cuba; "Nosotros': Exposición Antológica de la Obra de Raúl Martínez (1989), with Grupo ABTV, Centro Provincial de Artes Plásticas y Diseño, Havana, Cuba; El que imita fracasa (1988), with Ileana Villazón, Galería L, Havana, Cuba; Pinturas abstractas (1986), with Ileana Villazón, Galería de la Escuela Nacional de Arte (ENA), Havana, Cuba

== Selected group exhibitions ==
In dialogue (2020), Atlantic Center of Modern Art (CAAM), Las Palmas, Canary Islands, Spain; Goaltending (2017), Centro Cultural Español (CCE), Miami, FL; Reverse: Rewrinting Culture (2014), Dot Fiftyone Gallery, Miami, FL; Medianoche en la ciudad (2011), ARTIUM. Centro Museo Vasco de Arte Contemporáneo, Vitoria-Gasteiz; Centre d’Art la Panera, Lleida, Spain; Killing Time: An Exhibition of Cuban Artist from the 1980’s to the Present (2007), Exit Art, New York City, NY; Nueva tecnología, nueva iconografía, nueva fotografía. Fotografía de los años 80 y 90 en la Colección del Museo Nacional Centro de Arte Reina Sofía (2004), Museo Nacional Centro de Arte Reina Sofía (MNCAR), Madrid; Museu d’ Art Espanyol Contemporani (MAEC), Palma de Mallorca; Museo de Arte Abstracto Español, Cuenca, Spain; Fallen Heroes. Masculinity and Representation (John Coplans, Gilbert & George, Peter Land, Paul McCarthy, Mark Morrisroe, Juan Pablo Ballester, Del Lagrace Volcano) (2002), Espai d´Art Contemporani de Castelló (EACC), Castellón de la Plana, Spain; Inter/Zona. Arts Visuals i Creació Contemporània a Barcelona (2001), Virreina Palace, Barcelona, Spain; Ofelias y Ulises. En torno al arte español contemporáneo (2001), 49th Venice Biennale, Pavilion in the Old Barns of Giudecca, Venice, Italy; Transgenéric @ s. Representations and Experiences on Genres, Society and Sexuality in Contemporary Spanish Art (1998), Koldo Mitxelena Kulturunea, San Sebastián, Spain; Cuba On. 11 Conceptual Photographers (1998), Generous Miracle Gallery, New York City, NY; Breaking Barriers. Selection from the Permanent Contemporary Cuban Collection (1997), Museum of Art Fort Lauderdale, Fort Lauderdale, FL; Cuba Siglo XX. Modernidad y Sincretismo (1996), Atlantic Center of Modern Art (CAAM), Las Palmas, Canary Islands; Fundación La Caixa, Palma de Mallorca; Arts Santa Mònica, Barcelona, Spain; Kuba O.K. (1990), Städtische Kunsthalle Düsseldorf, Düsseldorf, Germany

== Selected Public and Private Collections ==
- Museum of Art Fort Lauderdale. Contemporary Cuban Collection, Fort Lauderdale, FL
- The Metropolitan Bank and Trust Photography Collection, Ohio
- Cintas Foundation Collection, Miami, FL
- Howard Farber Collection, New York City, NY
- Arturo Mosquera Collection, Miami, FL
- Juan Redón Collection, Barcelona, Spain
- Museo Nacional Centro de Arte Reina Sofía (MNCAR), Madrid, Spain
- Institut Valencià d'Art Modern (IVAM), Valencia, Spain
- ARTIUM. Centro Museo Vasco de Arte Contemporáneo, Vitoria-Gasteiz, Spain
- Atlantic Center of Modern Art (CAAM), Las Palmas, Canary Islands, Spain.
- Fonds National d’Art Contemporain, Paris, France
- Ludwig Forum für Internationale Kunst, Aachen, Germany,
- National Museum of Fine Arts of Havana, Havana, Cuba

== Other activities ==
- Conceptualization, content development, assistant curator and coordinator of the exhibition and art book La mirada del samurái: los dibujos de Akira Kurosawa (The glance of the samurai: Akira Kurosawa's drawings), Azkuna Zentroa, Bilbao, 2010; Museo ABC. Centro de Arte, Dibujo e ilustración, Madrid, 2011. ISBN 8492441399 ISBN 978-8492441396
- Coordinator of Año Kurosawa 2010 (Kurosawa Year 2010). A celebration for the birth centenary of Akira Kurosawa in Spain organized by Casa Asia Barcelona, Universitat de Barcelona (UB) y Cultural Affairs, Barcelona, 2010. https://static.casaasia.es/pdf/3221050658PM1269274018766.pdf
- Coordinator and design consultant for Espejos de la imagen. Una historia del retrato en España, 1900–2000 (Image mirrors. A history of portraiture in Spain, 1900–2000). Exhibition curated by Manuel García for Explorafoto 2001. II Photography Festival in Salamanca, San Eloy Exhibition Hall, Salamanca, 2001. Legal deposit: S-783-2002
- Art selector and coordinator of La Marató de L´espectacle Video Show, Mercat de les Flors, Barcelona, 1996–2003
- Co-organizer, event coordinator and exhibition curator of Cuba: La isla posible (Cuba: The Possible Island). First multidisciplinary event that brought together Cuban artists, writers and intellectuals from the island and exile to debate the future of Cuban Culture, Centre de Cultura Contemporània de Barcelona (CCCB), Barcelona, 1995. ISBN 978-8423325290
