= José Toirac =

José Toirac (born José Angel Toirac y Batista on April 7, 1966, in Guantanamo, Cuba) is a Cuban artist specializing in painting, drawing, and installation.

Toirac from 1979 to 1981 he studied in the Escuela Elemental de Artes Plásticas 23 y C, in Havana, Cuba. Between 1981 and 1985 he studied painting in the Escuela Nacional de Bellas Artes “San Alejandro” in Havana, Cuba. And since 1985 to 1990 he studied painting in the Instituto Superior de Arte (ISA), Havana, Cuba.

Toirac was a member from 1988 to 1992 of the artistic group Grupo ABTV, along with Tanya Angulo, Juan Pablo Ballester, and Ileana Villazón.

== Individual exhibitions ==
Among his must relevant personal exhibitions we can quote in 1989 Nosotros, Exposición Antológica de la obra de Raul Martínez, in the Centro Provincial de Artes Plasticas y Diseño, Havana, Cuba. In 1992 he presented T&T. Todo para Vender, in the Galería Habana, Havana, Cuba. (José Angel Toirac/Tanya Angulo) (T&T) (Grupo ABTV). In 1996 he exhibited Death and Representation (exhumations), in the Ludwig Forum für Internationale Kunst, Aachen, Germany. And in 1997 he made Habana: tenemos lo que a usted le gusta y lo que aún no sabe que le gusta, in the Centro de Desarrollo de las Artes Visuales, Havana, Cuba.

== Collective exhibitions ==
He was part of many collective exhibitions like Suave y fresco, in the Museo Nacional de Bellas Artes, in Havana, Cuba, in 1988. (exhibited as grupo ABTV). In 1992 he was part of the Von Dort aus: Kuba, in the Ludwig Forum für Internationale Kunst, Aachen, Germany. In 1995 he was included in El rojo y el verde, at the I Bienal Internacional de Grupo. Galerie Cargo, Marseilles, France. In 1996 he also participated in the Foire Internationale d'Art Contemporain (FIAC), in Paris, France. (represented by Galerie Nomade, Paris, France). And in 1997 he was one of the selected artists to conform Cuban Contemporary Art, in the Urasoe Museum, Okinawa. Hillside Forum Daikanyama, Tokyo. Iwaki City Cultural Hall, Iwaki, Japan. In 2010-12 Toirac participated in the exhibit Queloides which was presented in Havana, Pittsburgh, New York City, and Cambridge, Ma.

== Awards ==
During his life he had obtained many awards and recognized, among them we can mention in 1992 the Fellowship, for the Agustin Parejo School, in Málaga, Spain. In 1996 he obtained the Fellowship, for the Ludwig Forum für Internationale Kunst, Aachen, Germany. And in 1998 he gained the Prize in Curatorship at the II Art Contemporaine Saloon from the exhibition Jao Moch. Homenaje a Antonia Eiriz, Havana, Cuba.

== Collections ==
His works can be found in the permanent collections of:

- Ludwig Forum für Internationale Kunst, in Aachen, Germany,
- Museo Nacional de Bellas Artes de La Habana, Havana.
- Centro Atlántico de Arte Moderno, Las Palmas, Canary Islands, Spain.
- Arizona State University Art Museum, Tempe, AZ.
- Museum of Rubell Family Collection, Miami, FL.
- The Rhode Island School of Design Museum, Providence, Rhode Island.
- Museum of Modern Art (MoMA), New York City.
- Orange County Museum of Art, Newport Beach, CA.
- Jack S. Blanton Museum of Art, Austin, Texas.
- The Bronx Museum of the Arts
