= Pedro Vizcaíno =

Cuban-born American artist (born 1966)

- Born: 1966; Havana, Cuba
- Education: Academia Nacional de Bellas Artes San Alejandro
- Known for: Visual art
- Movement: Contemporary art

Pedro A. Vizcaíno Martínez (born October 11, 1966, Havana, Cuba), is a Cuban-born American visual artist based in Miami, Florida. He was one of the members of Arte Calle, a Street Art group, between 1985 and 1987. He works in the mediums of painting, drawing, performance, and installation art.

== Early life and education ==
Pedro Vizcaíno, known by some under nickname "cafetero," was born on October 11, 1966, in Havana. Since 1993, he has resided primarily in the Little Havana (or Pequeña Habana) neighborhood in Miami, Florida. He attended the Academia Nacional de Bellas Artes San Alejandro, where he graduated in 1981. He continued his studies at the School of Artistic Education at the “Enrique José Varona” Superior Pedagogic Institute (Spanish: Universidad de Ciencias Pedagógicas "Enrique José Varona") in 1985.

== Work ==
Pedro Vizcaíno's work and cartoonish style combines references from graphic design, 1980s urban art, and illustration. to elaborate on social and political critique. According to critics, his works has been influenced by painters Robert Rauschenberg and Philip Guston.

=== Exhibitions ===
Throughout his career his work has been exhibited in museums and galleries in the United States, Europe, Latin America and the Caribbean, in countries such as Spain, Cuba, Mexico, and Poland. Major exhibitions include Atopia (2010) at the Center of Contemporary Culture of Barcelona, Spain; Wild Child Graffiti (2008) at Figarelli Contemporary, Scottsdale, Arizona.

In 2023, Vizcaíno presented the solo show Pedro Vizcaíno: Mind Control at the NAME Publications gallery space in Miami, Florida.

=== Collections ===
Vizcaíno's work is part of public and private collections such as National Museum of Fine Arts, Havana; Nina Menocal Collection, Mexico; Pérez Art Museum Miami; Lowe Art Museum, Miami; Museum of Contemporary Art, North Miami; DACRA, Miami Beach; Kendall Art Center, Miami; and the Museum of Latin American Art, Long Beach, California.
