= Herberto Dumé =

Cuban theatre director

- Born: 1929; Matanzas, Cuba
- Died: 8 April 2003 (aged 73–74); Miami, Florida
- Education: National Academy of the Performing Arts
- Occupation: Theater director

Herberto Dumé (1929 – 8 April 2003) is best known for his theater direction.

== Biography ==
Herberto Dumé was born in Matanzas, Cuba, in 1929. He graduated from the National Academy of the Performing Arts in 1950. He began his career as a theater director in 1955 and in 1959 became the director of the Teatro Nacional de Cuba, where he founded the theater company Grupo Guernica. Dumé left Cuba for exile in Spain in 1965 and soon after settled in New York.

In 1969, with the support and sponsorship of the New York State Council on the Arts, Dumé, José Corrales, and Edy Sánchez founded Dumé Spanish Theater in a small basement in the Greenwich Village area of New York City. The Dumé Spanish Theater staged plays in Spanish as well as poetry recitals, art exhibitions, lectures, and other cultural activities. When Dumé moved to Miami in 1978, Silvia Brito took over the Dumé Spanish Theater and renamed it Thalia Spanish Theatre.

Dumé is also known for his one-man poetry recitals. He staged plays by writers from Bernard Shaw and Henrik Ibsen to Cuban playwrights Abelardo Estorino, José Triana, and Virgilio Piñera. Dumé died on 8 April 2003, in Miami.
