= Carlos Rodríguez Cárdenas =

Cuban painter (born 1962)

- Born: 1962 (age 63–64); Sancti Spíritus, Las Villas, Cuba
- Education: Instituto Superior de Arte
- Known for: Painting, serigraphy, drawing

Carlos Rodríguez Cárdenas (born 1962) is a Cuban painter known for his work in serigraphy, drawing, and painting. He became a key figure in Cuba's art movement of the late 1980s before going into exile in Mexico and eventually settling in New York City.

== Early life and education ==
Rodríguez Cárdenas was born in 1962 in Sancti Spíritus, Las Villas, and completed his arts studies in 1983 at Havana's Instituto Superior de Arte (ISA). He formed part of the René Portocarrero workshop, where he began to make a name for himself in serigraphy, drawing and painting.

== Career ==
He became a key figure in the resurgence of criticism and of the arts movement at the time. His participation played a decisive role in the birth of the provisional group. From among the imagery created in the late 1980s, which questioned and made ironic the "revolutionary" state slogans, some of Rodríguez Cárdenas's proposals became iconic representations of his generation such as his self-portrait featuring him bare-chested, the skin painted like a brick wall, on which the words "I am my home" are written; from his neck hangs a skeleton with a comic blurb that reads "I do not exist, only my intention". In Rodríguez Cárdenas's work, parody, humor and caricature tend away from coarseness, although they may confront the audience with what is vulgar in a society in crisis. His work invites the spectator to question reality, to see beyond the world of the official word imposed by a system that had become senseless.

He experienced significant censorship in Cuba, which contributed to his decision to go into exile in Mexico in the early 1990s. He eventually settled in New York, where he continued to focus his art on the artistic quality of his subjects and designs while maintaining his earlier commitments. His later work imparted his compositions with even more distinctive character.

Rodríguez Cárdenas lives and works in the New York area.

== Exhibitions ==
During the next few years, Rodríguez Cárdenas held solo exhibits at Obra Reciente, Galeria Nina Menocal, Mexico; D.F., Carlos Cardenas, Galeria Ramis F. Barquet in Monterrey, Mexico; About the Blue Wall, Fredric Snitzer Gallery, Coral Gables, Florida; ARCO 93 International Art Fair, Madrid, Spain; and Pinturas, Fredric Snitzer Gallery, Coral Gables.

== Collections ==
His works are included in such major collections as the Whitney Museum of American Art in New York; the Museum of Fine Arts in Boston; the Museum of Art in Fort Lauderdale, Florida; Kendall Art Center / The Rodriguez Collection; the Museum Ludwig in Cologne, Germany; the Villa Clara Provincial Museum in Villa Clara; and Museo Nacional de Bellas Artes de La Habana in Havana.
