= Arte Calle =

Cuban art collectivee

The Arte Calle Street Art Group (El Grupo Arte Calle) was a Cuban art collective founded by Aldo Menéndez Lopez(Aldito) and Ofill Echevarria in 1986. The group, as first was documented by a documentary of the Escuela Internacional de Cine y Televisión (EICTV) de San Antonio de los Baños, Cuba (International School of Cinema and Television of San Antonio de los Baños), directed by Pablo Dotta as his thesis work and copyrighted, 1988, Entitled: "Viva la Revolu", consisted of eight students of visual art in ages between 16 and 23 years old, most of them from the legendary Academy Of San Alejandro, who staged a series of "Murals", "Graffitis", “Happenings” and "Performances" between 1986 and 1988. The group transformed icons from pop culture to make ideological metaphors.

The group, which in the beginning was "non officially" led by Aldito Menéndez and that after his voluntary separation from it in 1987, continued its work equally successfully until its break-up one year after, consisted of: Aldito Menéndez, Ofill Echevarria, Eric Gómez Galán, Ernesto Leal Basilio, Iván Alvarez, Ariel Serrano, Leandro Martínez Cubela and Pedro Vizcaíno.

Arte Calle was also known by including friends and all kind of young artists in its actions. Some of them achieved a name as well, as part of the famous Havanan group, such as: Hugo Azcui, Nilo Castillo, Ernesto Benítez, Alan Manuel González, Max Delgado, among others.

One of the emblematic works of the group was the street performance, nearer to a street demonstration, where Menéndez painted on a canvas the phrase "Relive the Revolu" and stood next to a container with a sign asking the public for their donations to finish the work.
