= Arte Al Limite =

Arte Al Limite (AAL) is a bi-monthly Spanish-language magazine that focuses on trends in contemporary art. Founded in 2002 by Ana María Matthei, Arte Al Limite is based in Santiago, Chile, and is published in both Spanish and English. The publication consists of a monthly newspaper that analyzes Chilean and Latin American contemporary art, as well as a luxury collector's magazine. As part of its project, Arte al Limite also maintains a web platform and a virtual museum.
