= Adriano Buergo =

Cuban artist (born 1964)

- Born: José Adriano Buergo y Ortiz; March 5, 1964 (age 62); Cuba
- Education: Escuela Nacional de Bellas Artes "San Alejandro"; Instituto Superior de Arte (ISA)
- Known for: Painting; drawing; installation art
- Movement: Grupo Vindicación; Grupo Puré
- Awards: Grand Prize – Salón Playa’87 (1987); First Place – Salón Nacional de Artes Plásticas de Escuelas de Arte (1983)

Adriano Buergo (born José Adriano Buergo y Ortiz March 5, 1964), is a Cuban artist specializing in painting, drawing and installations.

Buergo was a member of two in Havana, Cuba based artistic groups: Grupo Vindicación, from 1983–84; and Grupo Puré, from 1986–1987.

Buergo studied painting in at the Escuela Nacional de Bellas Artes "San Alejandro" between 1980 and 1983 and continued his studies until he graduated from the Instituto Superior de Arte (ISA) in 1988. He was a professor at the Instituto Superior Pedagógico "Enrique José Varona," in Havana, Cuba, from 1988-1990.

== Individual exhibitions ==
- 1986 – "Del Ambiente", Wifredo Lam Center, Havana, Cuba.
- 1989 – "Roto Expone. Adriano Buergo", Castillo de la Real Fuerza, Havana, Cuba.
- 1990 – "Solo Show", Provincial Center of Culture, Pinar del Río, Cuba.
- 1991 – "Ana Albertina & Adriano", Nina Menocal Gallery, Mexico City, Mexico.

== Collectives exhibitions ==
- 1986 – "Puré Expone", Galería L, Havana, Cuba.
- 1986 – "10 Años del I.S.A.", Museo Nacional de Bellas Artes de La Habana, Havana, Cuba
- 1986 – "XVI Seminario Juvenil de Estudios Martianos", I.S.A., Havana, Cuba
- 1986 – "Salón Nacional de Artes Plásticas de Escuelas de Arte (nivel medio)", Museo Nacional de Bellas Artes de La Habana, Havana, Cuba.
- 1988 – "Venes Artistas Cubanos", Massachusetts College of Arts, Boston, Massachusetts
- 1988 – Raíces en acción, Museo de Arte Carrillo Gil, Mexico City, Mexico
- 1988 – Arte cubano, Galeria Tetriakov, Moscow, Russia
- 1988 – Veintitantos abriles, Galeria Habana, Havana, Cuba
- 1988 – Estrictamente personal, Fototeca de Cuba, Havana, Cuba
- 1988 – Aire fresco, Galería Plaza Vieja, Grupo Puré, Havana, Cuba
- 1988 – Expo Puré, Parallel Exhibition to Havana's III Biennial of Art. Instituto Superior de Arte, Havana, Cuba
- 1988 – Primer encuentro de jóvenes artistas, Museo Provincial de Villa Clara, Cuba
- 1989 – Tradición y contemporaneidad, III Bienal de La Habana, Museo Nacional de Bellas Artes, Havana, Cuba
- 1989 – Kitsch, Galería de Galeano, Parallel Exhibition to Havana's III Biennial of Art. Havana, Cuba
- 1989 – Tributo, Galeria Habana del Este, Parallel Exhibition to Havana's III Biennial of Art. Havana, Cuba
- 1989 – Sexo y erotismo, Universidad de La Habana, Parallel Exhibition to Havana's III Biennial of Art. Havana, Cuba
- 1989 – Paisaje, Comité Estatal de Finanzas, Parallel Exhibition to Havana's III Biennial of Art. Havana, Cuba
- 1989 – Salón Nacional de Pequeño Formato, Centro de Arte Camagüey, Cuba
- 1989 – Es solo lo que ves (Arte abstracto) Havana, Cuba
- 1989 – La Habana en Madrid, Centro Cultural de la Villa, Madrid, Spain
- 1990 – Kuba OK", Kunsthalle Düsseldorf, Düsseldorf, Germany
- 1990 – No man is an island, Pori Art Museum, Finland, and Mücsarnok, Budapest, Hungary, and also Palffy Palace, Vienna, Austria.
- 1990 – Salón Nacional de Pequeño Formato, Camagüey–Las Tunas, Cuba
- 1990 – El objeto esculturado, Centro de Desarrollo de las Artes Visuales, Havana, Cuba
- 1991 – Artistas Cubanos, Ninart, Centro de Cultura, Mexico City, Mexico
- 1991 – Los Cubanos Llegaron Ya II, Ninart, Centro de Cultura, Mexico City, Mexico.
- 1991 – La Naturaleza Simbolizada, La Unidad de Promoción Cultural y Acervo Patrimonial de la S.H.C.P., Mexico City, Mexico.
- 1991 – Los hijos de Guillermo Tell. Artistas cubanos contemporáneos, Museo de Artes Visuales Alejandro Otero, Caracas, Venezuela y Banco de la Republica de Colombia, Bogotá, Colombia.
- 1991 – Nuevas adquisiciones contemporáneas: muestras de arte cubano, Museo Nacional de Bellas Artes, Havana, Cuba
- 1991 – Cuba construye (Arte Joven Cubano), Euskal Fondoa \Bilbao, Bilbao, Spain
- 1992 – Los Cubanos Llegaron Ya III, Ninart, Centro de Cultura, Mexico City, Mexico
- 1992 – La Década Prodigiosa: Plástica Cubana de los 80, Museo Universitario del Chopo, Mexico City, Mexico
- 1992 – I Bienal del Caribe y Centroamérica, Galería de Arte Moderno, República Dominicana
- 1992 – Expo-Arte Guadalajara 92, Guadalajara, Mexico City, Mexico
- 1993 – Muro Roto/Broken Wall, Fred Snitzer Gallery, Miami, Florida
- 1997 – Breaking Barriers: Selections from the Museum of Contemporary Cuban Art Collection, Museum of Art, Fort Lauderdale, Florida
- 2000 – Palmas Reales y Vitrales, José Alonso Fine Arts Gallery, Miami, Florida
- 2001 – Entre Cubanos. Artemira Gallery, Dominican Republic
- 2001 – CAFE. Augusta Savage Gallery, Amherst, Massachusetts
- 2002 – CAFE II: The journeys of Cuban Artists. University of Colorado Colorado Springs

== Awards ==
- 1983 – First Place – Salón Nacional de Artes Plásticas de Escuelas de Arte (nivel medio), Museo Nacional de Bellas Artes de La Habana, Havana, Cuba
- 1986 – Award – XVI Seminario Juvenil de Estudios Martianos, Instituto Superior de Arte (I.S.A), Havana, Cuba
- 1987 – Grand Prize – Salón Playa’87, Servando Cabrera Moreno Gallery, Havana, Cuba
- 1988 – Honorable Mention – Salón de la Ciudad, Centro Provincial de Artes Plásticas y Diseño, Havana, Cuba

== Collections ==
His work can be found in the permanent collections of:

- Museo Cubano de Arte y Cultura, Miami, Florida
- Museo Nacional de Bellas Artes de La Habana, Havana, Cuba
- The Lowe Art Museum, University of Miami, Coral Gables, Florida
- Museum of Arts, Fort Lauderdale, Florida
- Galería Nina Menocal, Centro de Cultura, Mexico City, Mexico
- Ludwig Forum für Internationale Kunst, Aachen, Germany
- Kendall Art Center, Miami, Florida
