= Ana Albertina Delgado Álvarez =

Cuban artist

- Born: April 1963 (age 63); Havana, Cuba
- Education: Academia Nacional de Bellas Artes San Alejandro; Instituto Superior de Arte (ISA), Havana
- Known for: Painting; installation art; photography

Ana Albertina Delgado Álvarez (born April 1963) is a Cuban artist. Her main disciplines are painting, installations and photography. She studied at the Academia Nacional de Bellas Artes San Alejandro in Havana, Cuba. In 1988 she graduated from the Instituto Superior de Arte (ISA), Havana. During the 1980s she was member of the group Vinculación and also of the Group Puré in Havana, Cuba.

== Life ==
Delgado Álvarez was born in April 1963 in Havana, Cuba.

== Individual exhibitions ==
Two of her most important exhibitions were in 1989 "Dentro del Labio". Proyecto Castillo de la Fuerza, Havana and at the next year "La caja de los sueños". Galería Nina Menocal, México.

== Collective exhibitions ==
She has featured in many collective exhibitions, among them "El ISA Saluda la Bienal". First Havana Biennial Bienal de La Habana, 1984. Galería L, Havana, at the same time she was included in "Grupo Vinculación" Instituto Superior de Arte (ISA). Other important exhibition was "Kuba O.K. Aktuelle Kunst aus Kuba/Arte Actual de Cuba". 1990 Städtische Kunsthalle Düsseldorf, Düsseldorf, R.F.A. and "The Nearest Edge of the World: Art and Cuba Now.", 1991, The Bronx Museum of Art, New York City, U.S.A. In this same country she was part of "Breaking Barriers. Selections from the Museum of Art’s Permanent Contemporary Cuban Collection", 1997, Museum of Art, Fort Lauderdale, Florida, U.S.A.

== Awards ==
She has been awarded in several occasions for example in 1985 a Mention in Photography and Drawing, Contest 13 de Marzo, Havana. In 1986 she won the award XVI Seminario Juvenil de Estudios Martianos, Instituto Superior de Arte (ISA), Havana, and in 1987 Mention. Salón Playa ’87, Galería Servando Cabrera Moreno, Havana, Cuba.

== Collections ==
Her works are located in Galería Nina Menocal, Mexico City, in the Ludwig Forum für Internationale Kunst, Aachen, Germany, in the Art and Culture Cuban Museum, Miami, United States, in the Kendall Art Center, Miami, and in the Museo Nacional de Bellas Artes de La Habana, Cuba among many others private and institutional collections.
