= Raúl Martínez (artist) =

Cuban artist (1927–1995)

Raul Martínez
- Born: Publio Amable Raúl Martínez González; 1 November 1927; Ciego de Ávila, Cuba
- Died: 2 April 1995 (aged 67)
- Movement: Cuban Art/ Cuban Revolutionary Art / Pop Art
- Partner: Abelardo Estorino

Publio Amable Raúl Martínez González, known as Raúl Martínez, (1 November 1927 – 2 April 1995) was a Cuban painter, designer, photographer, muralist, and graphic artist. He is best known for colorful pop-art portraits of leading Cuban political figures including José Martí and Camilo Cienfuegos.

Martínez was born in Ciego de Ávila and studied in Havana and at the San Alejandro Academy in Havana, Cuba, and later at the School of the Art Institute of Chicago. His early works were abstract, moving towards figurative work later in his career. After the Cuban Revolution of 1959, Martínez helped the foundation of the Cuban Film Institute (ICAIC), Casa de las Américas and the Cuban Book Institute, through his career as a freelance graphic artist.

== Biography ==
Raúl Martínez was a well-rounded designer, as he was successful in just about every art form he pursued: from the early abstract paintings to the later representative ones; from photography to college; from screen printing movie posters to freelance graphic design for government institutions such as the ICAIC. Originally a member of a group that called themselves Los Once (The Eleven), Martínez found success in all of his artistic endeavors until the end of his life in 1995.

Martínez was born Publio Amable Raúl Martinez González in Ciego de Ávila, Cuba, on 1 November 1927, as the son of a sugar-mill worker and a teacher. (Note: There is little information available on the artist's life before his debut into the art world due to a couple of factors, the most obvious being the instability in the country of Cuba during the revolution, as well as the later embargo between Cuba and the United States.)

Raúl Martínez studied at the Academy of Arts of San Alejandro, and later at the Institute of Design in Chicago, Illinois. During the 1950s he worked in the advertising agency OTPLA. Was the artistic director of the cultural magazine Lunes de Revolución. Sporadically designed film posters for ICAIC. During the 1960s was a professor of design in the School of Architecture of the University of Havana. His work has participated in collective and personal expositions and the biennials of Mexico; São Paulo, Brazil; Venice, Italy and in the Salon de Mai, Paris, France. His work has been rewarded on repeated occasions. He obtained the Silver Medal, Cuban Painting Exhibition, 1960; Medal of Bronze, International Exposition of the Art of the Book (WENT), Leipzig, Germany, 1965 and the National Prize of Plastic Arts, National Union of Writers and Artists of Cuba (UNEAC), 1995. The Council of State of the Republic of Cuba offered him the Distinction of National Culture, 1981; the Medal Alejo Carpentier, 1983 and the Order Félix Varela, 1988.

Raúl Martínez had his first exhibition in 1947, in the XXIX Salón de Pintura y Escultura de Círculo de Bellas Artes. His earlier works were a typification of Cuban art of the time: the outcome of a play with expressionist and post-cubist devices, and has been described as "competent, stereotypical, and forgettable".

The artist's more notable entrance into painting was in 1956, when he started his abstract-expressionist work, leaving the group Los Once to pursue more representational work, at which point he left behind any traces of the "stereotypical" aforementioned.

== The revolution and his work ==
The revolution had not influenced the work of Martínez until 1962 when the blockade between the United States and Cuba occurred. Even then, the influence of the revolution did not, yet, have a substantial effect on the body of work. Martínez simply began incorporating topical titles into his work (which becomes evident in his exhibition Expressionismo Abstracto in 1963). Abstraction soon became the mode of expression of the Cuban artist, shifting from billboard advertisements to abstract paintings by 1964, when Rauschenberg-like symbols began to appear in the artist's paintings (first with the number 26 as a graphic symbol in 26 de julio).

Substantial to the progression of Martínez's work was the importance of his life-partner, Abelardo Estorino, a prominent playwright and poet in Cuba at the time. It has yet to be determined how influential Estorino had been directed upon the work of Martínez, but substantial to the progression of the artist's work was that he was homosexual. During the homosexual paranoia in Cuba in the 60's and 70's, Martínez had lost his job as a teacher in the school of architecture in Havana, which caused him to further pursue his career as a freelance designer, while continuing his career as a prominent painter in Cuba, following his already well-known body of work.

=== Paintings ===
By 1965, Martínez started losing interest in abstraction, but did not return to the "painting for the sake of painting" ideals of Los Once, who believed in "expression of aesthetic emotion through plastic means – form and color – so that the spectator faced with the work would be moved by its basic element: painting." Figuration made its return to the work of the artist, who longed for closer communication with the public. "Magic always has been important for me, the magic of the surface and the magic of an expressive life transmuted on it. But magic I define the process of looking for the unknown, which is what I always have done." (Note: Quotes from speeches not otherwise cited are translations from tape recordings made by Camnitzer.)

Briefly, during the 1960s, Cuba had been heavily influenced by the socialism of Soviet Russia. The USSR had a heavy impact on the developing art scene in Cuba, raising the marvel of social realism as an art form soon after the liturgical awakening in Cuba, where the literacy in the country had undergone a massive overhaul, the likes of which the world had never seen. (The literacy rate of the average adult went from 20%, to over an astounding 75% over the course of 12 years) When later asked why at the time he did not go with socialist realism, Martínez answered that "Cuban artists were building upon something that had not been built up yet; they could experiment, but they could not take anything for granted." This idea of a national art form was nothing new to the Latin American Art World, as is evident through Colombian and Brazilian art during the same time period and years prior.

The development of icons was inevitable given the impact of individuals such as Che and Fidel to the developing Cuban culture. During his time studying at the Institute of Design in Chicago, Illinois, pop art was just beginning to emerge in the United States. Though this direct exposure to the emerging movement was rather brief, the inclusion of some of the devices of the movement found their way into the work of Martínez, who has been credited as a creator of "a very Cuban pop aesthetic", isolating popular elements of the time with the hope of returning them to the people as the true and original owners of the symbolic goods.

=== Relation with U.S. Pop Art ===
Though there were a few borrowed elements from the movement in the United States, Martínez simply borrowed the serial structure that was most apparent. Like the artists in the U.S., Martínez used a preexisting popular image but did not really delve into mass-media aesthetics, nor into the desensitization methods utilized by other North American artists of the time. Instead of taking images from the media, he sought images taken from display cases in Workers' Centers and Defense Committees, images that were produced without taking aesthetics into consideration, and sometimes lacking evident technical skills, to be included into his work. By this time, the work of Martínez had moved from strictly painting with the inclusion of painted photographic images to heavy photographic collage implementation. The artist had also migrated from the idea of letting the canvas speak for itself, to beginning a piece with somewhat of an idea already in mind. The compositions made during this time were somewhat reminiscent of the contemporary Western art but did not erase his emotional individuality seen in his pieces.

=== Freelance and the ICAIC ===
Later in his career, after being fired from the school of architecture in Havana, Raúl Martínez soon began his work as a freelance designer and made countless contributions to the Cuban Film Institute, and other centralized government organizations (before the decentralization of powers on Cuba under Fidel's reign). Otherwise known as the ICAIC (the acronym before translation), the organization played a major role in both the importance of the revolution to the history and development of Cuba, as well as perpetuating the inclusion of popular art within the culture. In a time when there was little else for the public to do for leisure, the movies were increasingly popular to the Cuban culture. Because of the embargo, movies were very limited in Cuba, thus the demand for new material was rather high. One of the outcomes of such demand was a cinematic success called Lucía, for which the poster was designed by Martínez, and has come to define the movie. (Note: The importance and impact of the ICAIC are not to be underscored by the lack of mention in this article, but its relevance to both the career of the artist and the impact of Cuban culture.)

== Legacy ==
The work of Raúl Martínez traces the progression of the pop art movement in Cuba, as well as the political influences of Cuban Revolutionary art. Examining his work throughout his lifetime, one can trace the artistic progression of Cuban art from Abstract Expressionism, to the later collages of militaristic figures.

Influenced by the growing pop-art movement, Martínez created a series of designs for magazines, books, and posters. Note that while the pop art movement, especially in terms of Warhol, was all about the inclusion of ready-mades and the repetition of pop icons that were found images. This is not the case of Martínez. Even though there were many common devices found in his work, such as bright colors and repetition of culture icons (Martí), his work that is considered to be of the pop art genre was mostly painted, undermining many of the ideals of pop art as we know them today. Many of his works carried the themes and iconography of the Cuban revolution, using vibrant colors and comic book themes. In 1966 Martínez began the first of many designs based on the image of national hero José Martí.

Works by Raúl Martínez have been, and are still on exhibit in museums throughout the world. He made at least twenty personal exhibits, including exhibitions of his drawings and designs in the Center of Cuban Studies in New York (1975), and Cuban photography and posters (1983, United States). He also received the Silver Medal in the Cuban Painting Exhibition at Tampa University, Florida. Cuba's National Museum of Fine Arts dedicates a large space in the permanent collections halls to Raúl Martínez.

== Selected solo exhibitions ==
=== 1948 ===
- Raul Martinez. Vestibule of Adad theater, in Matanzas.

=== 1950 ===
- Raul Martinez. Lyceum, Havana, Cuba.

=== 1952 ===
- Raul Martinez. Matanzas Gallery, Matanzas, Cuba.
- Raul Martinez. Lyceum, Havana, Cuba

=== 1954 ===
- Raul Martinez and Agustin Cardenas. Lyceum, Havana, Cuba.

=== 1957 ===
- Raul Martinez. Lyceum, Havana, Cuba.

=== 1962 ===
- Enamels and Ink. Lyceum, Havana, Cuba.

=== 1964 ===
- Tributes. Havana Gallery, Havana, Cuba.
- Raul Martinez. National Museum of Fine Arts, Havana, Cuba.

=== 1966 ===
- Raul Martinez and Antonia Eiriz. Galeria de la Casa del Lago, Mexico D.F., Mexico.

=== 1975 ===
- Solo exhibition. Center of Cuban Studies of New York.

=== 1978 ===
- The Great Family. Havana Gallery, Havana, Cuba.

=== 1980 ===
- Raúl Martínez. Abstractions of 57 to 66. L Gallery, Havana, Cuba.

=== 1984 ===
- Solo exhibition. I Biennial of Havana, Havana, Cuba.

=== 1985 ===
- Pinta mi amigo el pintor. Habana Gallery, Havana, Cuba.

=== 1988 ===
- Nosotros (We). Retrospective Exhibition. National Museum of Fine Arts, Havana, Cuba.

=== 1989 ===
- Acerca de la Conquista. Vestibule of Charles Chapplin Movie, Havana.
- Raúl Martínez. Xawerego Gallery, Varsovia, Polony.
- Solo exhibition. Latin American Gallery, Cracovia, Poland.

=== 1990 ===
- Selection of Nosotros. 23 y 12 Gallery, Havana, Cuba.
- Raul Martinez en la plástica cubana. Servando Cabrera Moreno Gallery, Havana, Cuba.
- Homenaje a la cultura cubana. Playa Gallery, Havana, Cuba.

=== 1991 ===
- De la Conquista. Facultad de Artes y Letras, Universidad de la Habana, Cuba.

=== 1992 ===
- Comentarios de la Conquista. National Museum of Fine Arts, Havana, Cuba.
- Islas 90. Juan David Gallery, Havana, Cuba.

=== 1994 ===
- Abstract Painting. Wifredo Lam Centre, Havana, Cuba.
- Anthological Exposition. Los Lavaderos Gallery, Santa Cruz de Tenerife, Canarias Islands.
