= Abilio Estévez =

Cuban novelist, playwright and poet

Abilio Estévez is a Cuban novelist, playwright and poet. He was born in Havana in 1954. He lives in Barcelona.

== Selected works ==
- El horizonte y otros regresos
- Tuyo es el reino
- Los palacios distantes
- Ceremonias para actores desesperados
- Inventario secreto de la Habana
