= Catriona Fraser =

British photographer and art dealer

- Born: 1972 (age 53–54); England
- Occupations: Art dealer, photographer, curator, art activist
- Known for: Infrared landscape photography

Catriona Fraser (born England 1972) is a British photographer and art dealer. She has lived in Washington, DC since 1996.

== Education ==
Fraser studied at the Plymouth College of Arts and Design in Plymouth, England, where at the time - at age 16, she was the youngest student ever admitted to the school's photography diploma course.

== Art Dealer ==
Fraser established the Fraser Gallery in the Georgetown neighborhood of Washington, DC in 1996 when she was 25 years old. She opened a second gallery in nearby Bethesda, Maryland, part of the Greater Washington, DC region in 2002. The galleries closed in 2011. During the years that they operated, the galleries established a significant presence in the region via their exhibitions. as well as internationally through their seminal and early employment of the then novel Internet to expand the gallery's reach and exhibitions. The galleries focused on contemporary realism and represented notable artists such as Tim Tate, David FeBland, Maxwell MacKenzie, F. Lennox Campello, Kris Kuksi, Chawky Frenn, Michael Janis, Sandra Ramos, Marta Maria Perez Bravo, Joyce Tenneson, Lida Moser and others.

== Photographer ==
Fraser herself is a photographer, and her work focused on black and white infrared photography of Scottish landscapes, medieval ruins and Pictish stone circles and standing stones. In 2002, The Washington Times art critic reported that "Catriona Fraser, who runs the Fraser Gallery and also makes remarkable photographs... She regularly returns to her native Scotland to shoot with infrared film for the haunting, mystical light she achieves." Also in 2002, the Washington City Paper art critic wrote "Fraser's grainy technique gloriously captures subtleties, from weathered stone in castle walls and turrets to fluffy, snowy textures one would not expect in clear skies."

In 1997 The Washington Post art critic wrote that "Her moody, evocative pictures won first prize for photography in the Northern Virginia Arts Festival in 1994 and 1995 and have proven popular at outdoor arts festivals across the United States. At her inaugural show, they sold well."

== Arts advocate and curator ==
Fraser is currently an arts lecturer, the chair of the annual Bethesda Painting Awards, an annual painting competition which awards $14,000 in prizes, and the annual Trawick Art Prize Competition - a fine arts competition which awards $10,000 to an artist from the DC, Maryland, and Virginia region. She is also the director of the annual Bethesda Fine Arts Festival, as well as an active curator.
