= Tephra Fine Arts Festival =

The Tephra ICA Arts Festival (previously known as the Northern Virginia Fine Arts Festival) is a juried major outdoor visual arts show held annually since 1991 on the streets of the Reston Town Center in Reston, Virginia and sponsored by the Tephra Institute of Contemporary Art, formerly known as the Greater Reston Arts Center.

== History ==
Starting in 1991, the Greater Reston Arts Center began staging what is now ranked as one of the major outdoor fine arts festivals in the nation, and which grew both in critical reputation as well as attendance, with an estimated 30,000 visitors during the three-day festival. Between 1991 and 2021 the show was known as the Northern Virginia Fine Arts Festival, and the name was changed to the Tephra Fine Arts Festival following a similar name change of the festival's organizer, which changed from being the Greater Reston Arts Center to the Tephra Institute of Contemporary Art in 2021.

The festival usually showcases the works of about 200 juried artists from across the United States, covering 16 categories spanning most of the visual arts genres such as painting, drawing, printmaking, sculpture, fiber arts, and glass, as well as high-end crafts such as clothing, jewelry, and furniture. The festival is usually staged in the month of May, with the exception of 2020, when the show was cancelled, and of 2021, when it was held during September as a result of the COVID-19 pandemic.

== Process ==
The artists are selected via a curated, juried process, where three jurors (which are different each year) review applications from all over the nation to finally select and invite about 200 artists. Selection to exhibit at the show has been described as "a major accomplishment for the artists." In addition to the visual artists, the organizers also stage musical and food events. Over the years, the festival has used many notable jurors, such as artists Willem de Looper, Mary Early, Chawky Frenn, Joseph Craig English, J. J. McCracken, and others, as well as museum directors such as Jack Rasmussen of the American University Museum at the Katzen Arts Center in Washington, DC, Gerald Ross, Director of Exhibitions and Curator at the Maryland Institute College of Art (MICA) in Baltimore, MD, Kenneth Trapp, Curator-in-Charge of the Smithsonian American Art Museum's Renwick Gallery, and blogger, critic and author F. Lennox Campello, and Leanne Mella, a founding member of the Film and Video program at the Whitney Museum of American Art.

== Critical reception ==
The festival has been characterized by The Washington Post as "among the best art shows in the country", and has consistently ranked as "one of the top five" outdoor art shows in the United States. Over the years many notable artists have participated in the festival, including Sheila Giolitti, Joseph Craig English, and others.
