= Women Artists of the DMV =

Art exhibitions in Washington, 2025–2026

Women Artists of the DMV was a sprawling, curated, fine arts exhibition held from late 2025 to early 2026 in 20 different art venues across the Greater Washington, DC capital area region, known locally as the DMV (stands for District, Maryland, Virginia). The shows featured over 700 female fine artists, was curated by F. Lennox Campello, and was characterized as the "largest ever curated fine arts exhibition held in the USA."

== Notable artists ==
The 19 venues showcased many of the key female fine artists of the region, including Renee Stout, Rosemary Feit Covey, Amber Robles-Gordon, J.J. McCracken, Helen C. Frederick, Andrea Way, Sandra Pérez-Ramos, Judith Peck, Margery Goldberg, E. J. Montgomery, Michele Banks, Holly Bass, Margaret Boozer, and others, as well as mid career and emerging artists, many of whom, such as Selena Jackson, received their first ever exposure in a museum.

== Critical reviews ==
The various exhibitions were widely reviewed in the region, including written reviews in The Washington Post, many other newspapers, fine arts platforms, as well as television and radio segments. Michael Janis, writing in East City Art noted that "Women Artists of the DMV is as much about the future as the present. He [Campello] sees it as a living document—a record of artistic production by women in the DMV in the mid-2020s."

== Controversy ==
The exhibition gathered some controversy when the Terra Foundation Center for Digital Collections at the Smithsonian Institution declined to accept a gift of the digital archives of the sprawling survey show, and the curator accused the Smithsonian of not "being interested in local artists."

== Exhibiting venues ==
- American University Art Museum at Katzen Center
- Zenith Gallery, Washington, DC
- Adah Rose Gallery, Rockville, MD
- Universities at Shady Grove, Rockville, MD
- Joan Hisaoka Healing Arts Gallery, Washington, DC
- Artists & Makers Gallery, Rockville, MD
- Montpelier Arts Center, Laurel, MD
- The Athenaeum, Alexandria, VA
- The Writer's Center, Bethesda, MD
- Pyramid Atlantic Arts Center, Hyattsville, MD
- McLean Project for the Arts, McLean, VA
- University of Maryland Library, College Park, MD
- Children's National Hospital Gallery, Washington, DC
- Strathmore Mansion, North Bethesda, MD
- Maryland Hall for the Arts, Annapolis, MD
- Melissa Ichiuji Gallery, Front Royal, VA
- Nepenthe Gallery, Alexandria, VA
- Falls Church Art Gallery, Falls Church, VA
- ARTSpiration, Frederick, MD
- BlackRock Center for the Arts, Gaithersburg, MD
