= Andrea Way =

American artist (1917–1999)

- Born: 1949 (age 76–77); San Francisco, California

Andrea Way (born 1949) is an American artist currently based in Washington, D.C.

Her geometric abstract works stem from a personal fascination with patterns and are based on a system of order and randomness that are labor-intensive, with a "punishing complexity".

She received her B.A. in 1971 from Indiana University, Bloomington, and in 1976 she moved from California to Washington, D.C.

== Exhibitions ==
Her first solo exhibition was held in 1980 at the Barbara Fiedler Gallery in Washington, DC. Since then she has held numerous other solo exhibitions at galleries in San Francisco, Brooklyn, and New York, including a mid career retrospective in 2012, Andrea Way: Retrospective 1982–2012, at the American University Museum in the Katzen Arts Center in Washington D.C.

In 2012 she was also featured in the Smithsonian American Art Museum's exhibition, Abstract Drawings, which featured forty-six paper works from the museum's permanent collection. Her drawing Bones (1987) was presented alongside works of other artists. The exhibition explored the wide range of possibilities of abstraction as a form of artistic expression.

In the Spring of 2018, she premiered her twenty-third solo show, A Delicate Crossing, at Brian Gross Fine Art in San Francisco.

In 2025, her work was exhibited at the American University Art Museum at the Katzen Arts Center as part of the "Women Artists of the DMV" exhibition curated by F. Lennox Campello.

== Collections ==
Her works have been added to the permanent collections of The Phillips Collection, The Smithsonian American Art Museum, The Cleveland Museum of Art, Corcoran Gallery of Art, the Marsha Mateyka Gallery, and the Hirshhorn Museum & Sculpture Garden.
