= Fraser Gallery =

The Fraser Gallery was either of two Washington, D.C. (1996-2011) or Bethesda, Maryland (2002-2011) art galleries founded by Catriona Fraser, an expatriate British photographer and art dealer in Washington.

== History ==
Fraser opened the Fraser Gallery in 1996 in the Georgetown neighborhood of Washington. In 2002 she opened a second gallery in Bethesda, a Maryland suburb of the Greater Washington area. She also founded Secondsight, an organization of women photographers. The galleries closed in 2011.

The Fraser Gallery represented several significant artists during its operating years, including Tim Tate, David FeBland, Kris Kuksi, Chawky Frenn, Joyce Tenneson, Lida Moser, F. Lennox Campello, Michael Janis, Dianora Niccolini, Maxwell MacKenzie, Nestor Hernández, Mark Jenkins, as well as many key contemporary Cuban artists such as Sandra Ramos, Marta María Pérez Bravo, and others.

The Washington Post noted in 2000 that the gallery was able to take advantage of the then emerging Internet to stage art shows which "draws entries from all over the world", and a few years earlier, in 1998, praised the gallery for having "one of the liveliest, best-looking and best-organized sites in town", in a seminal article about art galleries' websites in Washington, DC. Upon the announcement of its closing, a Washington City Paper photography critic wrote that "the gallery mounted significant shows by such photographers as Maxwell MacKenzie and Lida Moser, as well as an annual photography contest".

Fraser is now the Chair of the Trawick Art Prize, an art competition for Maryland, Virginia and D.C. artists which awards $14,000 in prize money. She is also the director of the annual Bethesda Fine Arts Festival.

== Photographer ==
Fraser's own photographic work has focused overwhelmingly on black and white infrared landscape photographs of Scotland, ranging from traditional landscapes, to ancient Pictish ruins and medieval castles and fortresses. The photographs have been exhibited in museums and galleries in the US and Latin America, and awarded multiple prizes.
