= Sandra Perez-Ramos =

Puerto Rican artist

Sandra Pérez-Ramos
- Born: San Juan, Puerto Rico
- Education: University of Puerto Rico, Río Piedras
- Known for: Drawing, fiber arts, assemblage, public art
- Movement: Contemporary art
- Website: https://sandraperezramos.com

Sandra Pérez-Ramos (born San Juan, Puerto Rico) is a Puerto Rican artist and community art leader in the Maryland and Washington, DC area. She is a resident artist in Gallery 209 inside Artists & Makers Studios] in Rockville, Maryland. Pérez-Ramos earned a BA from the School of Communication at the University of Puerto Rico, Río Piedras campus, in 1997. She majored in Visual Arts for Public Communication, photography and design.

== Work ==
In 2020 her work was described by art critic Lennox Campello: "Pérez-Ramos channels her Caribbean upbringing in her accomplished works. Her artistic pedigree is evident in her gifted use of color and form to deliver highly stylized imagery, which over the years has grown into one of the hardest achievements in the art world: a completely distinct style and ritual." Her body of work includes, drawing, fiber arts, assemblage installations and public art.

In 2022, her design, The Gathering Tree, was selected as the winner of a major Maryland Park Public Art Project for Glenmont Forest Neighborhood Association. The project is a collaboration with Stuart Diekmeyer, artist and curator, in charge of the 3D structural concept. The Gathering Tree received two Project Implementation Grant Awards from the Maryland State Arts Council. It is located at the Glenmont Forest Neighborhood Park in Silver Spring, MD. In 2021, Pérez-Ramos' design, Celebration, was one of the winners of the National Cherry Blossom Festival's Art in Bloom Public Art Installation in Washington, DC. This work was acquired for the permanent collection of Children's National Hospital in DC. On the same year, her mural designs Roots and Hope Tree were selected for Wheaton Gateway and for #ArtHappensHere by the Arts & Humanities Council of Montgomery County, MD. Other murals by Pérez-Ramos can be found in Riverdale, Silver Spring and Bethesda in Maryland. She exhibits locally, nationally and her mixed media works have been juried into three photography biennials in Cuba and Puerto Rico. In 2025, her work was showcased at the American University Art Museum at the Katzen Arts Center as part of the "Women Artists of the DMV" exhibition.

She was co-founder of the first chapter of The Latino Art League of Greater Washington DC, and served as former Membership Chair of the Montgomery Art Association. Dominick Rabrun featured Pérez-Ramos in his documentary, A Portrait of Wheaton, for being and advocate and leader of Latin and diverse artists in the region and in Wheaton Arts Parade and Festival. She managed exhibitions in the first two locations of Wheaton Arts Parade Gallery. She currently works doing artist outreach, designing and installing exhibitions, through her role in the Arts & Cultural Heritage Division, for a branch of the Maryland National Capital Park and Planning Commission.

== Solo shows ==
- 2015 Rare Plants and Lunatics at the Bethesda Regional Library, Bethesda, Maryland.
- 2017 Textiles and Lunatics: Constructing Dreams at the Merge Gallery in Artists & Makers Studios 2, Rockville, Maryland
- 2022 Beyond Magical Thinking and Material at Pascal Gallery in the Center for the Performing Arts, Anne Arundel Community College, Arnold, Maryland.
- 2023 Se Juntaron Los Dioses: Finding Home at Maryland Hall for the Creative Arts in Annapolis, Maryland. Expresiones Variable Desconocida: Generación X. Convento de los Dominicos, San Juan, Puerto Rico.

== Select Juried shows ==
- 1998 III Bienal Internacional de Fotografía de La Llave del Cerro. Centro Cultural, Havana, Cuba.
- 1998 Primera Bienal Internacional de Fotografía de Puerto Rico. Museo del Arsenal de la Puntilla, San Juan,
- 2000 Expresiones Variable Desconocida: Generación X. Convento de los Dominicos, SanJuan, Puerto Rico.
- 2002 III Bienal Internacional de Fotografía de Puerto Rico. Museo del Arsenal de la Puntilla, San Juan, Puerto Rico
- 2009 Art Raw Inaugural in New York. Art Raw Gallery, New York City, New York
- 2008–2009 The Sketchbook Project III, Art House Gallery, Atlanta, Georgia. Itinerant show through museums and galleries at Georgia, District of Columbia, Pennsylvania, Massachusetts, Illinois, and New York. Including the Museum of Contemporary Art in D.C., 3rd Ward Brooklyn in Brooklyn, Museum of Design Atlanta, Georgia.
- 2009 National Fiber Directions 2009. The Wichita Center for the Arts, Wichita, Kansas
- 2014 FonFoto: Juried Mobile Phone Photo Exhibit. The Petaluma Arts Center, Petaluma, California
- 2016 Crossroads: Magic + Matter. Betty Mae Kramer Gallery. Silver Spring, Maryland
- 2016 Fiber Options: Material Explorations. Circle Gallery, Maryland Federation of Art, Annapolis, Maryland
- 2016 Magic and Color. Torpedo Factory, Alexandria, Virginia
- 2018 Fiber Options Exhibition. Circle Gallery, Maryland Federation of Art, Annapolis, Maryland
- 2018 Our Latin Roots/ Nuestras Raíces Latinas, Hispanic Heritage Month Exhibition of Prince George's County. Publick Playhouse. Hyattsville, Maryland.
- 2018 Inspired By Frida Exhibition. Artists & Makers Studios 2. Rockville, Maryland.
- 2021 Connection as a Cornerstone to a Strong Community, Wheaton Gateway Mural, Wheaton, MD.
- 2021 #ArtHappensHereMurals. Woodside Urban Park. Arts & Humanities Council of Montgomery County, MD.
- 2022 Languages of Fiber, The Goldman Gallery, Washington, DC.
- 2022 Estamos Aquí. BlackRock Center for the Arts, Germantown, MD.
- 2023 Interwoven. Betty Mae Kramer Gallery, silver Spring, MD.
- 2023 SHE: DC. Georgetown, Washington, DC.
- 2023 Origins and Ancestries, Caribbean Digital Artists.
- 2023 Arte Latino NOW. The Center for Latino Studies at Queens University of Charlotte, North Carolina.
- 2024 Fiesta. BlackRock Center for the Arts, Germantown, MD.
- 2025 Women Artists of the DMV. American University Art Museum at the Katzen, Washington, DC.
