= Betty White Unites! =

Art show in honor of Betty White

Betty White Unites! was an invitational visual arts exhibition held from January 14 to January 29, 2022 at the Zenith Gallery in Washington, D.C., as an homage and celebration to American actress Betty White, who had died at the end of 2021.

== Curator ==
The exhibition was curated by the gallery's director, Margery Goldberg. After White's death, she "called a number of artists and commissioned artwork honoring White." She noted that “People always say everybody loves Betty White. I just thought, this country has been so unbelievably divided... I thought [the exhibit] would be something that unites people.”

== Focus ==
The exhibition featured artwork by 19 invited artists from around the United States, all focused on White and/or her work. The artists included Bradley Stevens, Bulsby “Buzz” Duncan, Holly Boruck, F. Lennox Campello, Michelle Marcello, Carol Newmyer, and others.

== Critical reception and press ==
The exhibition received local, regional, national and international press.
