= Giolitti (surname) =

Giolitti is a surname. Notable people with the surname include:

- Alberto Giolitti (1923–1993), Italian artist
- Antonio Giolitti (1915–2010), Italian politician
- Florence Giolitti (born 1966), former French athlete
- Enrichetta Chiaraviglio-Giolitti (1871–1959, daughter of Giovanni), Italian philanthropist and activist
- Giovanni Giolitti (1842–1928), Italian politician, and prime minister of the Kingdom of Italy
- Sheila Giolitti, American artist and art dealer
