= Michele Banks =

American artist

- Education: George Washington University, Harvard University
- Occupation: Artist
- Known for: Abstract painting inspired by science and medicine
- Website: www.artologica.net

Michele Banks is an American artist (also known as Artologica) whose work explores themes inspired by science and medicine, including images such as viruses, bacteria, and plant and animal cells. Her paintings and collages explore neuroscience, microbiology, climate change and more. She lives and works in the Greater Washington, D.C. capital region.

== Education ==
She earned a BA from George Washington University in 1987, and an MA from Harvard University in 1989.

== Artwork ==
Although Banks' paintings are generally based on scientific and medical themes, she is not a scientist, but is fascinated by the natural world, and mankind's impact on that world, especially at the microscopic level. She has exhibited in galleries, art spaces, and art festivals around the Greater Washington, DC region and the Mid Atlantic. Several of her paintings have also been reproduced as book and journal covers.

In 2011 The Atlantic described her paintings as "simply breathtaking." A 2018 review, The Washington Post art critic observed that her paintings had "soft but vividly hued watercolors, some displayed in petri dishes, depict viruses, bacteria and other microscopic players, including sperm thronging an egg." Three years earlier, the same Washington Post art critic noted that her work "depicts the body indirectly through the mechanical pulses of EEG and EKG tests."

In 2020, as the coronavirus struck the planet, Banks art was a "natural" for depicting the virus. She noted that she "created a whole series of work specifically inspired by the pandemic. I’ve been painting viruses for years, so of course I painted the coronavirus, over and over. It was all I could think about.”

In 2025, her work was included in the major "Women Artists of the DMV" survey show curated by F. Lennox Campello.

== Solo and two person shows ==
2011 - Johns Hopkins University, Rockville, MD

2012 - Montgomery College, Silver Spring, Cafritz Art Center, “Our Small Rooms” (Two artist show)

2016 - “Hidden Worlds” Park View Gallery, Glen Echo, MD

2017 - “Hidden Universe” Johns Hopkins University Montgomery County, Rockville, MD

2018 - Artists and Makers Gallery, Rockville MD

2018 - Methods of Inquiry: Fields of Discovery, McLean Project for the Arts, McLean, VA
