= Roberto Azank =

Argentine artist

- Born: 1955 (age 70–71); Buenos Aires, Argentina
- Education: University of Buenos Aires
- Known for: Artist

Roberto Azank is an artist of the late 20th century and early 21st century, known primarily for his work as a still life painter. He was born in Buenos Aires, Argentina in 1955; the grandson of an oil canvas artist and the son of a master embroidery designer.

At the age of 14, Roberto won the first prize in painting at his high school; he went on to first study photography and later architecture at the University of Buenos Aires. In 1979, he moved to the United States where experimentation with various artistic forms and media led to his decision to pursue a career in the arts. As he continued to hone his craft, Azank began painting brightly colored abstract works in acrylics. By the late eighties, his style had evolved from abstract to figurative and he started painting in oils.

In 1994, Azank moved to New York's Catskill Mountains, settling in New Paltz and found in his still life works the definitive style for which he is known.

The San Francisco Business Times described his work as, "Roberto’s canvases convey a sense of hyper-reality through his bold use of color, precise lines and controlled composition. Common objects such as flowers, fruits, vessels and candles are given new life set against the strong horizon, which divides the artist’s rich color fields. These color fields, often indescribable in hue, are the cornerstone of Azank’s work, while the still life objects act as vehicles for exploration of positive and negative space, placement and scale. He elects to omit unnecessary ornamentation from his compositions, choosing instead to emphasize the precision and draftsmanship he originally investigated in architecture school."

Now at mid career, Roberto Azank has been described as a "metaclassical artist" whose interests lie in the abstract qualities of realism as opposed to the photographic copying of nature.

== Selected solo exhibitions ==
- 2006: Plus One Gallery, London, England
- 2006: Eleonore Austerer Gallery, Palm Desert, California
- 2005: London Art Fair, Plus One Plus Two Galleries, London
- 2005: Simmons Gallery, San Francisco, California
- 2005: Unison Arts Center, “Still Life Retrospective”, New Paltz, New York
- 2005: Eleonore Austerer Gallery, Palm Desert, California
- 2005: Sande Webster Gallery, “Garden Art”, Philadelphia, Pennsylvania
- 2004: Center of the Earth Gallery, Charlotte, North Carolina
- 2004: Patricia Rovzar Gallery, Seattle, Washington
- 2004: Simmons Gallery, San Francisco, California
- 2004: London Art Fair, Plus One Plus Two Galleries, London
- 2004: Plus One Plus Two Galleries, Art London '2004, London
- 2004: Plus One Plus Two Galleries, “American Realism”, London
- 2004: Eleonore Austerer Gallery, Palm Desert, California
- 2003: Bachelier-Cardonsky Gallery, Kent, Connecticut
- 2003: Vero Beach Museum of Fine Art, “Collector’s Choice”, Vero Beach, Florida
- 2003: Eleonore Austerer Gallery, San Francisco, California
- 2003: Center of the Earth Gallery, Charlotte, North Carolina
- 2003: Addison-Ripley Gallery, Washington, D.C.
- 2003: Eleonore Austerer Gallery, Palm Springs, California
- 2003: Plus One Plus Two Galleries, Art London '2003, London
- 2003: Patricia Rovzar Gallery, Seattle, W
- 2003: Artspace/Virginia Miller Gallery, “Latin American Invitational”, Miami, Florida
- 2003: Eleonore Austerer Gallery, “Latin Diversity”, San Francisco, California
- 2003: Artspace / Virginia Miller Gallery, Arte Americas Miami '2003
- 2002: Eleonore Austerer Gallery, San Francisco, California
- 2002: Austerer-Crider Gallery, Palm Springs, California
- 2002: Center of the Earth Gallery, “The New Realism”, Charlotte, North Carolina
- 2002: Bachelier-Cardonsky Gallery, “Still Lifes”, Kent, Connecticut
- 2002: Austerer-Crider Gallery, “Flower Power”, Palm Springs, California
- 2001: Eleonore Austerer Gallery, San Francisco, California
- 2001: Gomez Gallery, Baltimore, Maryland
- 2001: Bachelier-Cardonsky Gallery, Kent, Connecticut
- 2001: Eleonore Austerer Gallery, Palm Springs Int'l Art Fair
- 2001: Center of the Earth Gallery, Charlotte, North Carolina
- 2001: Artspace/Virginia Miller Gallery, Miami, Florida
- 2001: Lyons-Wier/Packer Gallery, Art Miami '2001
- 2001: Austerer-Crider Gallery, Palm Springs, California
- 2000: Byron Cohen Gallery, Kansas City, Missouri
- 2000: Eleonore Austerer Gallery, Palm Springs Int'l Art Fair
- 2000: Artspace/Virginia Miller Gallery, Miami, Florida
- 2000: Center of the Earth Gallery, “The New Masters”, Charlotte, North Carolina
- 2000: Brewster Arts Limited, Art Miami '2000
- 1999: Eleonore Austerer Gallery, San Francisco
- 1999: Artspace/Virginia Miller Gallery, Miami
- 1999: Brewster Arts Limited, “Major Works”, New York City
- 1999: William Havu Gallery, Denver, Colorado
- 1999: Brewster Arts Limited, Art Miami '1999
- 1999: Brewster Arts Limited, New York City
- 1999: Addison-Ripley Gallery, Washington, D.C.
- 1999: Albert Einstein College, Yeshiva University, New York City
- 1998: Hooks-Epstein Galleries, Houston, Texas
- 1998: Albert White Gallery, Toronto, Canada
- 1998: Lizan Tops Gallery, East Hampton, New York
- 1998: Albers Fine Art Gallery, Memphis, Tennessee
- 1998: Ramis Barquet Gallery, Art Miami 1998
- 1998: Artspace/Virginia Miller Gallery, Miami, Florida
- 1998: Brewster Arts Limited, New York City
- 1998: Meredith-Kelly Fine Arts, Santa Fe, New Mexico
- 1998: Elite Fine Art, Miami, Florida
- 1998: Byron Cohen Gallery, Kansas City, Missouri
- 1998: Lyons Wier Gallery, Chicago, Illinois
- 1998: Mulligan-Shanoski Gallery, San Francisco, California
- 1998: DeArte Magick, ‘Disegno e Colore’, Easton, Pennsylvania
- 1997: Consulate General of Argentina, New York City
- 1997: Gallery @ 425 Lexington, New York City
- 1997: Ramis Barquet Gallery, Art Miami 1997
- 1997: N.Y. Arts Magazine 2nd City-Wide Biennial, New York City
- 1993: Art and Mathematics Conference 1993, State University of New York @ Albany, New York
- 1992: Gallery @ Broward Community College, Ft. Lauderdale, Florida
- 1991: Marcos J. Alegría School of Fine Arts, Puerto Rico
- 1991: Olympia and York Gallery, New York City
- 1990: Galaxy Gallery, ‘Duel in the Sun’, Miami Beach, Florida

== Selected publications on the artist ==
- Who's Who in American Art (1999–2005)
- Pulse, Interview by John Nelson. March 31, 2005
- Woodstock/New Paltz Times, “Moving Stills”, by Mala Hoffman, April 14, 2005
- Desert Post Weekly, “Buenos Aires artist brightly colors Reality”, by Marc Thomson, February 5, 2004
- The Miami Herald, “Latin American Art in Coral Gables”, June 29, 2003
- Palm Springs Life,”Where to see Roberto Azank”, by Steve Biller, August 2003
- Coral Gables Gazette, “Latin American Masters of Today and Tomorrow”, July 3, 2003.
- Washington City Paper, Exhibition Review, by Louis Jacobson, March 7, 2003
- “When the Subject is also an Object (Conversations/Solitaire)”, Essay by Lee Klein, published by Addison-Ripley Gallery, February 2003
- Old Town Crier, Review by F. Lennox Campello, March 2003
- San Francisco Business Times, ”Viewing Art with an Eye towards Capital Growth”, by Lizette Wilson, September 27, 2002
- Woodstock-New Paltz Times,”Personally Speaking” by Mala Hoffman, August 22, 2002
- Chronogram, “On the Cover”, July 2002
- New York Arts Magazine, by Lee Klein, December 2001
- San Francisco Examiner, Review, by Anne Lawrence, June 12, 2001.
- The Desert Sun, Review by Jean McKig, December 2001
- Washington Post, exhibition review by Michael O'Sullivan, March 26, 1999
- Wall Street Journal, ‘Inside Art - Trendsetters- Creating the Next Direction’, “Cypherism and the Age of Computation”, New York, August 1999
- Miami Herald, “Cypherism and the Metaclassical Style of Roberto Azank”
- Essay by Dr. Ronald Vigo, published by Brewster Arts Ltd., March 1999
- ”Big Names in the Summer” by Armando Bravo, August 1, 1999
- Coral Gables Gazette, ”Gables Gallery exhibits Latin American Jewels”, July 1999
- Kansas City Star, ”Still Lifes are Still Effective”, by Robin Trafton, November 26, 1999
- Night Magazine, “An Appreciation” by Lee Klein, June 1999
- Easton [Pennsylvania] Irregular - “Disegno e Colore”, by Isadore La Duca, October 1998
- Kansas City Star, Review, by Alice Thorsen, July 1998
- New York City Arts Magazine, Review ”Art Miami 98”, by Lee Klein, February 1998
- New American Paintings, February 1998
- Waterfront Week, “Objectification” by F. Chapman, Williamsburg, Brooklyn, New York, May 1997.

== Selected collections ==
- Robert Miller, New York
- American Express Financial Advisors, Minneapolis
- Sprint Telecommunications, Kansas City
- Washington Convention Center, Washington, D.C.
