= Holly Bass =

American poet

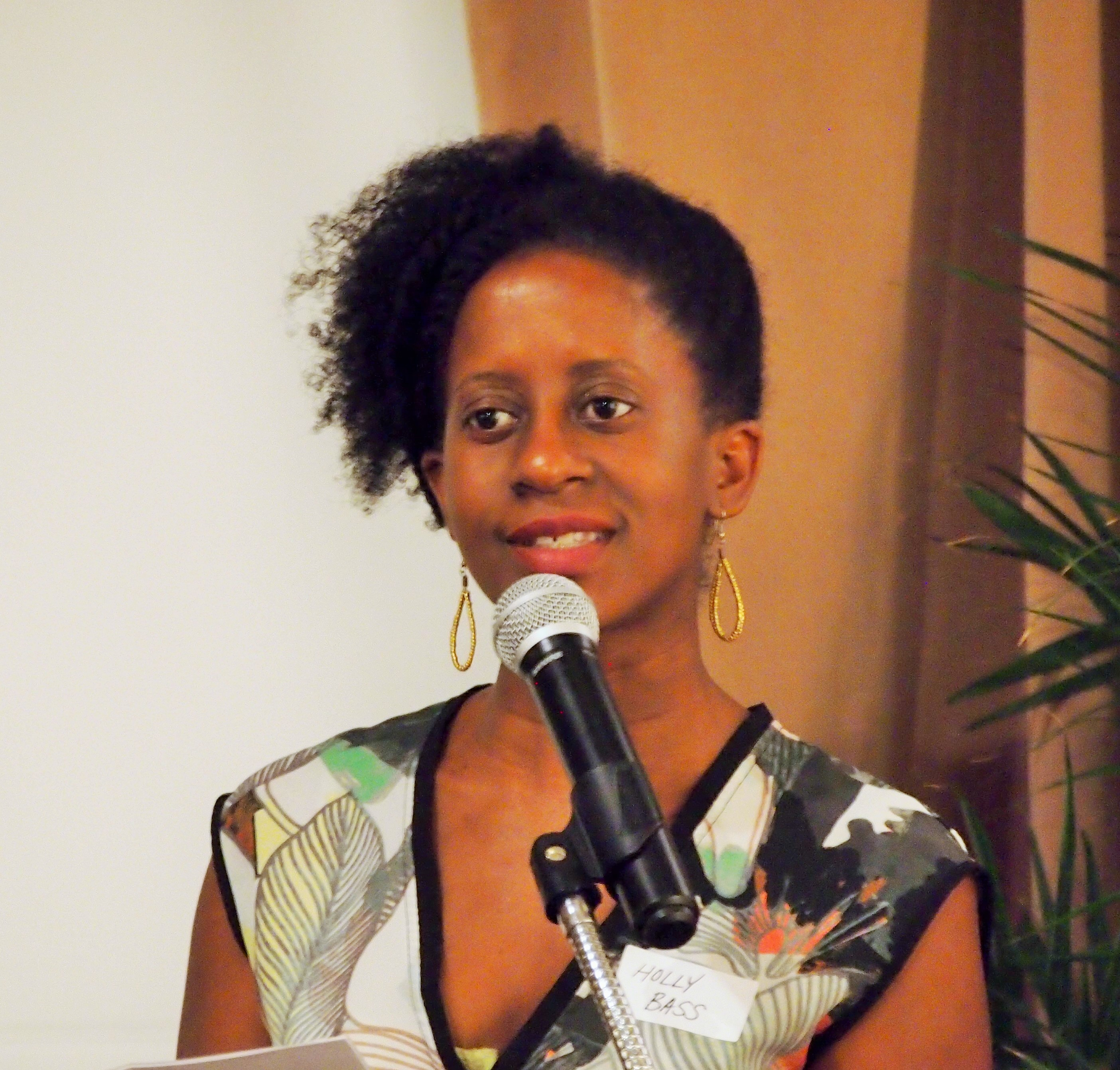
- Bass in 2017
- Occupations: Writer, artist, journalist

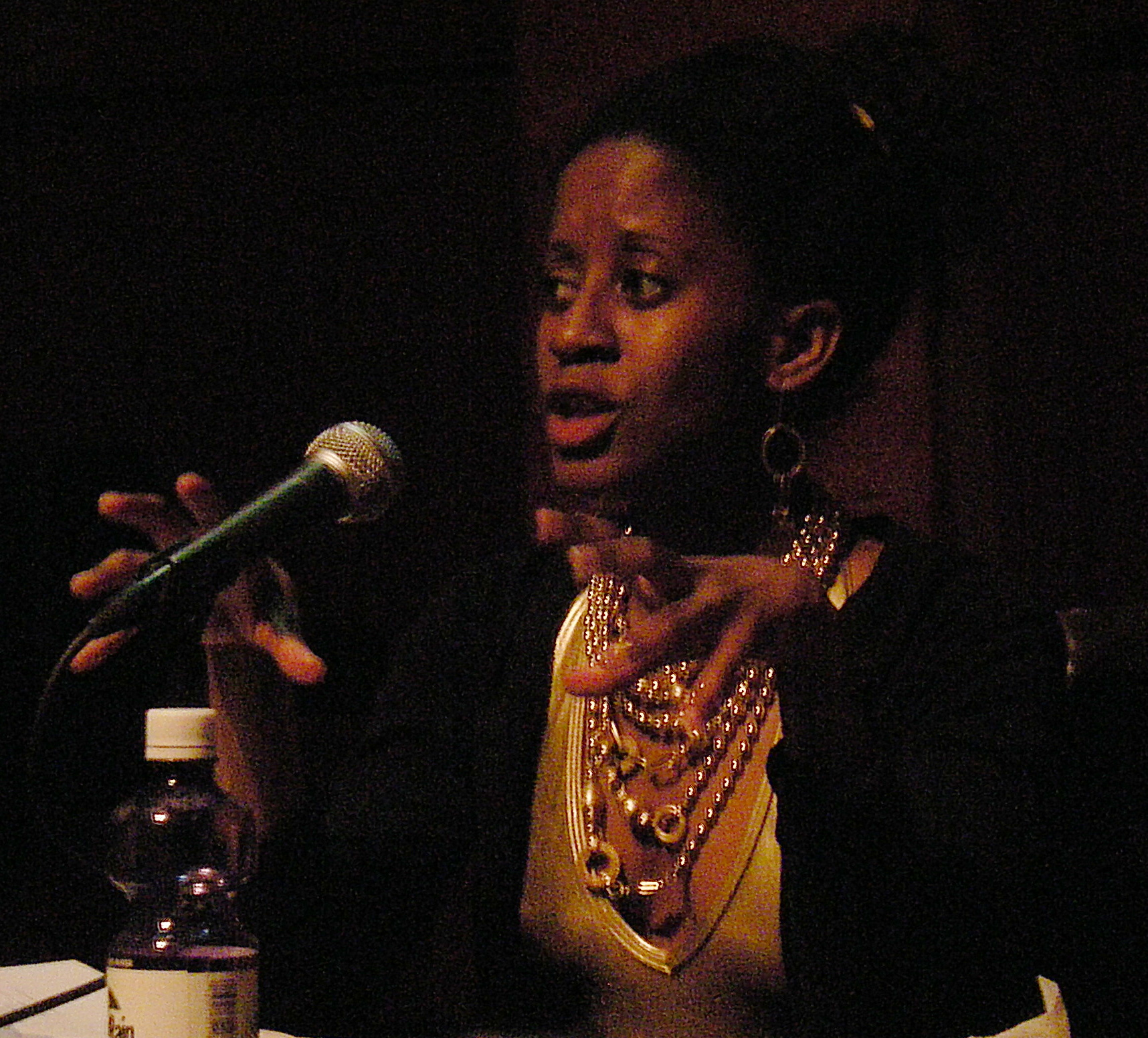
Bass at the 2009 Pop Conference in Seattle, Washington.

Holly Bass is an American poet, artist, writer and journalist based in Washington, D.C.

== Education ==
Bass studied modern dance under Viola Farber and creative writing at Sarah Lawrence College, where she was the commencement speaker from the class of 1993. She also has a Master’s degree in journalism from Columbia University (1994).

== Work ==
Her movement and spoken-word pieces reveal a fascination with "objectification, observation, and the commodification of art and of the body." Holly has performed across the US and internationally. She is a Cave Canem Foundation fellow and her poems, essays and articles have been published in numerous publications including the Wall Street Journal, The Washington Post, Callaloo and Beltway Poetry; and in 1999 she was the first person to use the term “Hip-Hop Theater” in print.

Her artworks include the installation Black Space at Martin Luther King Jr. Memorial Library in Washington DC, which comprises a small house placed on an outline of the city, alluding to the tiny house architectural movement and the housing problems in DC.

She wrote and performed the one-person dance piece Diary of a Baby Diva in Washington DC in 2005, a coming-of-age tale set in the late 1970s and early 1980s. The Washington Post noted her "wicked sense of humor" in making use of the more ridiculous cultural products of the age, but also a lyrical quality revealing her as an "eloquent poet".

Bass was voted Washington City Paper’s Best Performance Artist of 2012.

In 2018 she wrote and performed The Trans-Atlantic Time Traveling Company, which is "about a sisterhood of three women who time-travel from the present to the 1860s when they become freedwomen, in quest of what it means to be free."

More recently, in 2020, she wrote and performed Moneymaker at New York Live Arts in New York City. The piece has been described as "part political commentary and part celebration of social dance, Moneymaker interweaves a lineage of Black artistry with a satirical critique of the history of exploitation, commodification, and objectification of Black women." American Woman, a day-long durational performance and digital video with sound, was selected for the 2022 Outwin Boochever Portrait Competition at the National Portrait Gallery. In 2025, her work in included in the major survey "Women Artists of the DMV" exhibition curated by F. Lennox Campello.

Holly Bass's work was featured in the group show Get in the Game: Sports, Art, Culture, at the Pérez Art Museum Miami, Florida, in 2026. The show traveled from the San Francisco Museum of Modern Art, California.
