= Rosemary Feit Covey =

American printmaker

- Born: July 17, 1954 (age 71); Johannesburg, South Africa
- Education: Cornell University, Maryland Institute College of Art
- Known for: Wood engraving
- Awards: Rockefeller Foundation Fellowship, Alpha Delta Kappa Foundation National Fine Art Award
- Website: rosemaryfeitcovey.com

Rosemary Feit Covey (born July 17, 1954) is an American printmaker, whose work focuses on wood engraving.

She was born in Johannesburg, South Africa, immigrated to the United States in 1962, and studied at Cornell University and the Maryland Institute College of Art, and with the master wood engraver and illustrator Barry Moser. She currently resides in Alexandria, Virginia, and has a studio at the Torpedo Factory Art Center.

== Works ==
Her work deals with the themes of death, disease and the effects of illness. She has worked primarily in the medium of wood engraving since 1982. In 2007, she was commissioned by blogger David Welch, who was suffering from a brain tumor, to create a series of works depicting his treatment. In 2007-2008, she worked as a fellow at Georgetown University Hospital exploring her interest in these subjects. In November 2007, a large retrospective of her science-related work was displayed at the International Museum of Surgical Science in Chicago.

She created "The 0 Project", a large scale interactive installation that debuted at the Arlington Arts Center in Arlington, VA in October, 2007. The 0 Project also includes public participation in the forms of dance, music and related artworks.

She is represented in permanent collections in the Print Club of Albany, Boston Athenaeum, Corcoran Gallery of Art, the Houghton Library, the New York Public Library Print Collection, the National Museum of American History, Georgetown University, and the Papyrus Institute in Cairo, Egypt.

In 1998 she received a Rockefeller Foundation Fellowship in Bellagio, Italy. In 2004, she was invited to spend two months at the Grand Central in Santa Ana, California as the International Artist in Residence. In 2014, the Evergreen Museum, Johns Hopkins University, mounted "Crossing the Line: The Art of Rosemary Feit Covey" a retrospective exhibition of her prints, paintings, and installations.

In 2025 her work was included in the exhibition Women Artists of the DMV: A Survey Exhibition at the American University Museum curated by F. Lennox Campello.
