= Amber Robles-Gordon =

American visual artist (born 1977)

- Born: 1977 (age 48–49); San Juan, Puerto Rico
- Education: Trinity Washington University (BA), Howard University (MFA)
- Occupation: Visual artist
- Website: www.amberroblesgordon.com

Amber Robles-Gordon (born 1977) is an American mixed media visual artist. She was born in Puerto Rico and resides in Washington, D.C.. Robles-Gordon's work utilizes textile and collage techniques as a primary aesthetic language. Her work encompasses assemblages, large-scale sculptures, installations, and public art. Within her pieces, she uses found objects as sources of color and texture, contemplating the symbolic resonance of each color’s photonic wavelength. Every defining visual characteristic of a material or object—its shape, pattern, or text—contributes to a metaphorical, layered interrogational practice, through which she enacts societal critique. The objects themselves, though discarded or given away, permanently retain the energy of their past.

Robles-Gordon encourages transcendent societal messaging, such as embracing hybridity and resisting patriarchy. She also draws on matrices, the underlying grid-like structure of reality, as an intellectual foundation by translating them into fabric. This illustrates the warping and wefting of society, particularly the gender imbalance inherent within patriarchal structures.

== Early life and education ==
Amber Robles-Gordon was born in 1977 in San Juan, Puerto Rico, and was raised between Puerto Rico and Washington, D.C. Her early life was shaped by Caribbean diasporic culture, migration, and layered experiences of place, which later became central themes in her artistic practice. These formative years fostered her awareness of hybridity, cultural memory, and the social structures that inform identity.

Robles-Gordon’s artistic development was strongly influenced by her mother, Carmen Robles-Inman, whose career and values emphasized cultural engagement, education, and self-expression. In an oral history interview archived by the Anacostia Community Museum, Robles-Inman described her professional life in public service and education, stating that her work was grounded in “a commitment to community, history, and the preservation of lived experience.” This perspective informed the environment in which Robles-Gordon was raised, where observation, collecting, and creative inquiry were encouraged from an early age.

According to the same interview, Robles-Inman recalled that “from a very early age, I encouraged [Amber] to observe the world around her, to collect, to question, and to find beauty in unexpected places,” a philosophy that would later manifest in Robles-Gordon’s use of found materials and layered visual narratives. Exposure to her mother’s stories, professional path, and Caribbean heritage contributed to Robles-Gordon’s enduring engagement with memory, materiality, and the intersections of personal history and broader social systems.

She received a BS degree in 2005 from Trinity Washington University, in Washington, D.C. She subsequently received a MFA degree (painting) in 2011 from Howard University, also in Washington, D.C.

== Artwork ==
Robles-Gordon has been a key member of Black Artists DC, (BADC) serving as exhibitions coordinator, Vice President and President. Robles-Gordon is also the co-founder of Delusions of Grandeur Artist Collective.

Robles-Gordon has exhibited widely in the US, Europe, Canada and Asia. In 2010 she was granted an apprenticeship with the DC Commission on the Arts and Humanities to create a public art installation as part of the D.C. Creates Public Arts Program. She was subsequently also commissioned to create temporary and permanent public art installations for the Washington Projects for the Arts, the Northern Virginia Fine Arts Association (NVFAA), the Humanities Council of Washington, D.C., Howard University, and the Schomburg Center for Research in Black Culture.

== Reviews ==
In a 2018 review of her two-person show at the Morton Fine Art Gallery in Washington, DC, The Washington Post noted that "Robles-Gordon, a D.C. native, is known for hanging strands of textiles and other found objects in intricate arrangements... Whether seen as cosmic or botanical, the artist's circling compositions exalt natural cycles." A few years earlier, The Washington Post had observed that "Working entirely with found objects, the Caribbean-rooted local artist arrays ribbons and scraps on (mostly) wire frameworks. The result is a riot of colors and patterns, evoking the tropics while playing on the contrast between the rigid frames and malleable fabric."

In reviews of Successions: Traversing U.S. Colonialism, exhibited in 2021 at the American University Museum, critics emphasized the exhibition’s examination of U.S. territorial governance and its ongoing social and political consequences.

Critics responded strongly to Robles-Gordon’s politically engaged bodies of work. In Nashville Scene’s review of her SoveREIGNty: Acts, Forms, and Measures of Protest and Resistance exhibition at Tinney Contemporary in Nashville, the critic wrote: “Even the title of Amber Robles-Gordon’s Tinney Contemporary exhibition … expresses an activist message. And it’s emblematic of a display of large-scale, mixed-media quilts brimming with signals and symbolism interrogating U.S. policy toward — and governance of — its populated territories and the District of Columbia.”

The Washington Post’s review of Successions: Traversing U.S. Colonialism highlighted how the show grouped works representing the District of Columbia and five U.S. territories into a conceptual exploration of disenfranchisement, noting the layered visual language and use of abstraction to reveal social inequities.

Bmore Art emphasized the use of botanical symbolism in her work—such as the rubber tree motif—to evoke cultural genealogy and migration, framing Successions and related works as conveying a “first-person account of the intimacies of movement” linking personal history with broader geopolitical narratives.

Hyperallergic praised the way Robles-Gordon’s layered, banner-like pieces navigate histories of borders, social systems, and political hierarchies, creating a “liminal space of identity” that resonates with questions of sovereignty and belonging.

The Philly Art Blog underscored the emotional and political resonance of Place of Breath and Birth and Successions, describing the vibrant collage works and quilts as a deeply personal exploration of family, identity, and socio-political realities across U.S. territories.

== Exhibitions ==
=== Solo exhibitions ===
- 2010 Matrices of Transformation, Michael Platt Studio Gallery, Washington, DC
- 2011 Milked, National League of American Penn Woman, Washington, DC
- 2011 Wired, Installation and Exhibit, Pleasant Plains Workshop, Washington, DC
- 2012 Milked, Riverviews Art Space, Lynchburg, Virginia
- 2012 With Every Fiber of My Being, Honfleur Gallery, Washington, DC
- 2017 Arts Center/Gallery Delaware State University, Dover, DE
- 2017 Pennsylvania College of Art and Design, Lancaster, PA
- 2018 Kohl Gallery at Washington College, Chestertown, MD
- 2018 Third Eye Open, Morton Fine Art, Washington, DC
- 2020 American University (upcoming), American University Museum at Katzen Arts Center, Washington, DC
- 2020 La Universidad del Sagrado Corazón in San Juan, Puerto Rico
- 2021 American University, Katzen Arts Center, Washington, DC
- 2022 Tinney Contemporary, Knoxville, Tennessee
- 2022 Derek Eller Gallery, New York, NY
- 2022 August Wilson African American Cultural Center, Pittsburgh, PA
- 2023 International Arts and Artists at Hillyer, Washington, DC
- 2023 Morton Fine Art, Washington, DC
- 2023 Prizm Art Fair, Miami, Florida
- 2024 Indiana State University, Terry Haute, Indiana
- 2025 University of Quebec, Quebec, Canada
- 2026 Cultural DC, Washington, DC
- 2026 El Cuadrado Gris Galeria, San Juan, Puerto Rico
- 2026 University of Syracuse, Syracuse, Ney York

=== Site specific installations, public art and murals ===
- 2009 Art Installation, First on 1st Art and Music Walk, Washington, DC
- 2007 - 2009 Installation Exhibitor, Artomatic, Washington, DC
- 2010 Urban League National Art Expo, Convention Center, Washington, DC
- 2010 Windows in DC Mural, Commission on the Arts And Humanities, Washington Convention Center, Washington, DC
- 2011 Art Installation, Pleasant Plains Workshop, Washington, DC
- 2012 Art Installation, Art Africa Miami, Miami, Florida
- 2012 Art Installation, Wilmer Jennings Gallery at Kenkalaba, New York, NY
- 2013 Temporary Public Art Installation, Humanities Council of Washington, DC
- 2013 Art Installation, Hair Shrines: Praise and Be Praised, Athenaeum Gallery, Alexandria, VA
- 2013 Public Art Installation, Deanwood Recreation Center, Washington. DC
- 2014 Public Art Installation, Washington Projects for the Arts, Washington, DC
- 2014 Installation, Workshop, and Panel, James A. Porter Colloquium, Howard University
- 2014 Installation, Schomberg Center for Research in Black Culture
- 2015 Public Art, Department of General Services, Washington, DC
- 2013 - 2015 Prizm Art Fair, Marquis Miami, Miami, Florida2013 Temporary Installation, The 25 Project, United Negro College Fund, Wash. DC
- 2016 Art Installation, Galerie Myrtis, Baltimore, MD
- 2017 Art Installation, Ifyoulivedheredc, Pinkline Project at Smithsonian Anacostia Museum and Center for African American History, Washington, DC
- 2018 The Fibrous Ties The Bind, Public Art Installation, Salisbury, MD
- 2017 - 2018 Public Artwork, Martha’s Table Headquarters, Washington, DC
- 2019 With Every Fiber of My Being, Democracy Fund, Washington, DC
- 2019 For Ida B. Wells and Coolidge, Department of General Services, Washington, DC
- 2019 Fertile Grounds, The Nicholson Project, Washington, DC

=== Art fairs and international exhibitions ===
- 2007 Digital Exhibitor, Art DC, Washington, DC
- 2010 Urban League National Art Expo, Washington, DC Convention Center
- 2010 Masterpiece, Galeri Aswara, National Academy of Arts, Culture and Heritage, Hula Lumpur, Malaysia
- 2010 Gaza Strip II, Atelier & Galeria Felipe Lamadrid, Cadiz, Spain
- 2010 Capitol Flower, European Cultural Capitol
- 2010 Kamp-Lintfort, Germany
- 2010 Spaventapasseri, Art Gallery Atrebates, Dozza, Italy
- 2011 Options 2011 Biennial Showcase, Washington Project on the Arts, Washington, DC
- 2016 Parallax Art Fair, London, United Kingdom
- 2019 American Academy of Rome, Rome, Italy
- 2020 1-54 Contemporary African Art Fair, London, United Kingdom
- 2021 Tafeta Gallery, London, United Kingdom2021 Royal Academy of Art, Summer Exhibition, London, England
- 2022 Untitled Art Fair, Tafeta Gallery, Miami Beach, Florida
- 2023 Butter Art Fair, Indianapolis, IN

=== Group museum, university, historical research centers and traveling exhibitions ===
- 2006 Mother and Child: Expression of Love, Smithsonian Anacostia Museum and Center for African American History, Washington, DC
- 2006 Sistahs, In Our Own Words, Banneker Douglass Museum, Annapolis, MD
- 2007 A Creative Profile: Artist of the East Bank, Smithsonian Anacostia Museum and Center for African American History, Washington, DC
- 2009 Colorblind/Colorsight, The Rotunda Gallery at American University, Washington, DC
- 2009 Migrations: BADC Exhibit, Luther Collage, Decorah, Iowa
- 2009 Vice President, Black Artists of DC, BADC
- 2004 2009 Member and Curator, DC Black Artists, Washington, DC
- 2010 Global Art Buzz, University of California, Washington Center, Washington, DC
- 2010 Co-Founder, Delusions of Grandeur, Washington, DC
- 2011 Transformer Silent Auction Exhibition, Corcoran Gallery of Art, Washington, DC
- 2010 - 2012 President, Black Artists of DC, Washington, DC
- 2013 Member, Washington Projects for the Arts
- 2015 Personal Patterns, Montgomery College, Takoma Park, MD
- 2016 Arts for Justice, American University Museum, Katzen Center, Washington, DC
- 2017 Living on the Land, Salisbury University Art Gallery, Salisbury, MD
- 2019 The Path of Terminator Crossing and Juxtaposing Whiteness, American Academy, Rome, Italy
- 2021 Successions: Traversing US Colonialism, American University Museum, Washington, DC.
- 2021 We Built This House, The Anderson, VCU Arts, Virginia Commonwealth University, Richmond, VA
- 2023 Fibers of My Soul, Knowhere Gallery, Martha’s Vineyard, Oaks Bluffs, MA
- 2023 Finding Home, Maryland Hall, Annapolis, MD
- 2023 Solace and Sisterhood, Museum of Contemporary Art Arlington, Virginia
- 2023 2024 Puerto Rico Negrx, MAC Museo de Arte Contemporáneo de Puerto Rico
- 2025 Solace and Sisterhood, David C. Driskell Center, College Park, MD
- 2024 2025 The Avery Research Center for African American History and Culture at the College of Charleston, Charleston, South Corallina
- 2024 2028 Back and Forth: Keeping Time in Vaivén, University of Minnesota, Katherine E. Nash Gallery, Minneapolis, Minnesota
- 2025 Women Artists of the DMV, American University Art Museum at the Katzen Arts Center, Washington, DC.

=== Collections ===
- Judith A. Hoffberg Archive Library, University of California, Santa Barbara, CA
- Masterpiece Miniature Art, Kuala Lumpur, Malaysia
- Capital One Bank, McLean, Virginia
- City of Washington, DC
- Schomburg Center for Research in Black Culture, New York, NY
- The Gautier Family Collection, Washington, DC
- David C. Driskell CenterWilson Building Art Collection, Washington, DC
- Art In Embassies Program, Nigeria, 2020-2023
- Democracy Fund, Washington, DC
- Department of General Services, Washington, DC
- The Gautier Family Collection, Washington, DC
- Schomburg Center for Research in Black Culture, New York, NY
- District of Columbia’s Art Bank, funded by DC Creates Public Art, Washington, DC
- Capitol One Bank, McClean, Virginia

=== Apprenticeships and residencies ===
- 2010 - 2011 Apprenticeship, DC Commission on the Arts and Humanities, DC Creates Public Art, Deanwood, Recreation Center, Washington, DC
- 2016 Teaching Residency, Back to the Roots, Centro Cultural Costarricense - Norteamericano, Limon, Costa Rica
- 2017 Visiting Artist, Mc Daniel College, Westminster, MD
- 2017 Artist in Residence Program, Washington Projects for the Arts and DC Public School, Washington, DC
- 2018 Residency, The Talking Stick Project, University of Salisbury, Salisbury, MD
- 2019 Artist/Scholar Residency American Academy in Rome, Rome, Italy
- 2019 Artist Residency, The Nicholson Project, Washington, DC
- 2020 Visiting Artist Program, Universidad de Sagrado de Corazon, San Juan, Puerto Rico
- 2023 Visiting Artist, Pennsylvania Academy of Fine Arts, Philadelphia, Pennsylvania
- 2023 – 2025 Project Development Residency, Cultural DC, Washington, DC and Puerto Rico

=== Group memberships ===
- 2004 - 2005 Information Desk Representative, Corcoran Gallery of Art, Washington, DC
- 2004 - 2005 Docent, National Museum of Women in the Arts, Washington, DC
- 2007 Co-Chair, Black Artists of DC By-laws Committee
- 2006 - 2007 Member, Artomatic, Plastic Arts and Performing Arts Committee
- 2006 - 2007 Co-Chair, Howard University Graduate Painting Students Committee
- 2009 Vice President, Black Artists of DC, BADC
- 2004 - 2009 Member and Curator, DC Black Artists, Washington, DC
- 2010 Co-Founder, Delusions of Grandeur, Washington, DC
- 2010 - 2012 President, Black Artists of DC, Washington, DC
- 2013 Member, Washington Projects for the Arts
