= Alberto Giolitti =

Italian-American comic book artist (1923–1993)

- Born: November 14, 1923 Rome
- Died: April 15, 1993 (aged 69) Rome
- Area: Artist
- Children: Sheila Giolitti (daughter)

Alberto Giolitti (November 14, 1923 – April 15, 1993) was an Italian-American comic book artist.

He was born in Rome, the son of Nazzareno and Giuseppina Giolitti, where his family held (and still hold) one of the most famous cafés, the Caffè-Gelateria Giolitti, in which he also worked for a while. He began his studies at the University of Rome's Faculty of Architecture in 1941, but left without graduating when he was drafted for a brief period of army service. He debuted as artist for Il Vittorioso in the 1940s. After World War II, Giolitti moved to Argentina, where he worked for Editorial Lainez and Columba of Buenos Aires. After three years he was able to move to his original destination, the United States; there he became a mainstay of Western/Dell Publishing, penciling numerous characters, including Indian Chief, Sergeant Preston of the Yukon, Abraham Lincoln: Life Story, Tonto, Cisco Kid, Turok, and Gunsmoke.

He obtaining American citizenship in 1954, and in 1960 he returned to Italy with his American wife, Joan, and their young daughter Sheila, from where he continued to collaborate with Western under their Gold Key imprint and with other US and British publishers. Series he worked on in this period include Gold Key Comics' Star Trek and Edgar Rice Burroughs' Tarzan of the Apes. For the same company he drew a King Kong adaptation. In Rome in 1962 he established a studio of comics artists, called Studio Giolitti, managed by his wife Joan, which grew to employ as many as 50 artists and produced art for the European markets, notably England and Germany, in addition to his continuing work for Gold Key in the United States.

In 1986 he realized a long science fiction story, "Cinque anni dopo" ("Five Years Later"), and from the late 1980s he finished several stories of Italy's main comics western character, Tex Willer.

Alberto Giolitti died in Rome. His American-born daughter, Sheila Giolitti, is a fine arts painter and gallery owner living in Norfolk, Virginia. He and his wife also had a son, Eugenio, born after his return to Italy, who became a U.S. Navy SEAL and then a restaurant owner.
