= Margery E. Goldberg =

American artist, art curator and activist

- Born: 1950 (age 75–76); Rochester, New York
- Occupations: Artist and art gallery curator

Margery E. Goldberg (born 1950) is an American artist, art curator, city arts commissioner, and activist. She is best known as the founder and curator of Zenith Gallery in Washington, D.C., which exhibits contemporary art in all media, and represents over 100 emerging to mid-career and established artists.

== Biography ==
=== Early life and career ===
Goldberg was born in 1950 in Rochester, New York. She started sculpting in clay at the age of 10 and took classes at the Rochester Memorial Art Gallery during elementary and high school. Despite her aptitude for handiwork, she pursued art training during high school. Her father was a printer and advertiser, so Goldberg grew up around business operations.

Goldberg attended George Washington University from 1968 to 1972, earning a Bachelor of Arts degree in Fine Arts. From 1972 to 1977, she operated a workshop in a 100-year-old hayloft on Washington, D.C.'s K Street, where she built commissions and held art shows.

=== Founding of Zenith Gallery ===
After Goldberg's K Street studio burned down in 1977, she and two friends bought a 50,000 ft^{2} space at 15th Street and Rhode Island Avenue in Washington, D.C. It was this space, which included six townhouses, two large buildings, and multiple carriage houses, that would in 1978 become Zenith Gallery. Goldberg renovated some of the houses and rented rooms to artists. About half of Goldberg's artist-tenants also worked in studios at Zenith Gallery. In 1987, Goldberg opened a second location of Zenith Gallery in Washington, D.C., on 7th street's Gallery Row, which remained open until 2009. Following the closure of the Zenith Gallery location at Rhode Island Avenue in December 1987, Goldberg focused on creating non-commissioned pieces that were later offered for sale. According to Goldberg:

“How do you put creativity in a budget? I’d rather create the piece, and then if someone wants to come along and buy it, wonderful. Commissions pay the bills, but that’s about all they do.”

The gallery is currently located at 1429 Iris Street NW, Washington, D.C. Goldberg also programs art for the lobby at 1111 Pennsylvania Ave. NW.

=== Other activities ===
In 1980, Goldberg co-founded the Arts and Entertainment News Service, which videotaped and documented more than 30 arts, music, and cultural events for WETA-TV public television. Today, those videos serve as an archive of the Washington, D.C., art scene.

As an activist and arts advocate, Goldberg founded the Zenith Community Arts Foundation in 2000, a non-profit 501(c)(3) organization dedicated to initiatives and projects that benefit artists and the overall Washington, D.C., community. In 1998 and 2007, Goldberg served on Washington D.C.'s Downtown Arts Development Task Force. From 1992 to 1997, Goldberg was a commissioner of the DC Commission on the Arts and Humanities, and was treasurer of the Commission's executive committee for two of those years. A widely exhibited and respected artist, in 2025 Goldberg was part of the major "Women Artists of the DMV" survey show at the American University Art Museum at the Katzen curated by F. Lennox Campello.

== Honors, awards and distinctions ==
- In 1986, Goldberg was a finalist for Washington, D.C.'s Mayor's Arts Awards for her contribution to the arts
- In 2010, Goldberg was awarded Washington, D.C.'s Mayor's Arts Award for Excellence in Service to the Arts
- In April 2018, the Council of the District of Columbia honored Goldberg with congratulations on the 40th anniversary of Zenith Gallery, and recognized its success as a champion for the arts in the District of Columbia
