= Nestor Hernández =

American photographer

- Born: 1961; Washington, DC
- Died: May 13, 2006 (aged 44–45); Washington, DC
- Occupation: Photographer
- Known for: Street Photography

Nestor Hernández (1961–May 13, 2006) was an American photographer and photojournalist of Cuban descent, based in Washington, DC. Hernández was best known for his street photography of his Washington, DC neighborhood as well as street scenes of Cuba, Ghana and Mali, where he led arts-based projects for children and young adults.

== Work ==
Hernández was born in 1961 in Washington, DC of an Afro-Cuban father and an African-American mother, and he grew up in the DC area knowing little of his Afro-Cuban ancestry and Cuban relatives.

Hernández was introduced initially to photography in high school through the Urban Journalism Workshop of the D.C. public schools. He spent 15 years as the photographer for the Capital Children’s Museum, and then became the chief photographer for the Washington, D.C. public school system. His photographs appeared in many publications.

His photographs have been included in gallery, art spaces and museum exhibitions, including permanent exhibitions, in and around the Greater Washington, D.C. capital region, various American cities, Havana, Cuba, and Accra, Ghana. As a professional photographer, his photographs have been published in many newspapers and magazines, such as The Metro Herald, The International Review of African American Art, Port of Harlem magazine, Brookings Review, El Pregonero, The Latin Trade Report, and others.

== Awards ==
In 2002 he received the "Outstanding Emerging Artist" award, and in 2003 an Artist Fellowship Grant, both from the DC Commission on the Arts and Humanities. In 1998 he was the recipient of the "Community Service Award" given by the Exposure Group, African American Photographers Association, and in 2001 he was selected as the "Photographer of the Year" by the same association.

== Exhibitions ==
- 1999 - Inside Cuba: A Photographic Journey, Center for Collaborative Art and Visual Education (CAVE), Washington, DC
- 2000 - Forever Young: A Portrait of the Black Child, Capital Children's Museum, Washington, DC
- 2002 - In the Arms of the Elders, Anacostia Smithsonian Museum, Washington, DC
- 2003 - Cuba Now!, Sumner School Museum and Archives, Washington, DC
- 2003 - De Aqui y de Alla (From Here and From There) - Contemporary Cuban Artists, Fraser Gallery, Bethesda, Maryland
- 2004 - Walking to their own beat: Afro-Cuban Musicians and the Black Identity, Latin American Youth Center, Washington, DC
- 2005 - Our Children, Our World, Children's National Medical Center, Washington, DC
- 2006 - Love, Loss and Longing: The Impact of U.S. Travel Policy on Cuban-American Families, Arlington Arts Center, Arlington, VA
- 2007 - Nestor Hernandez Memorial Survey, International Visions Gallery, Washington, DC
