= John Grazier =

American painter (1946–2022)

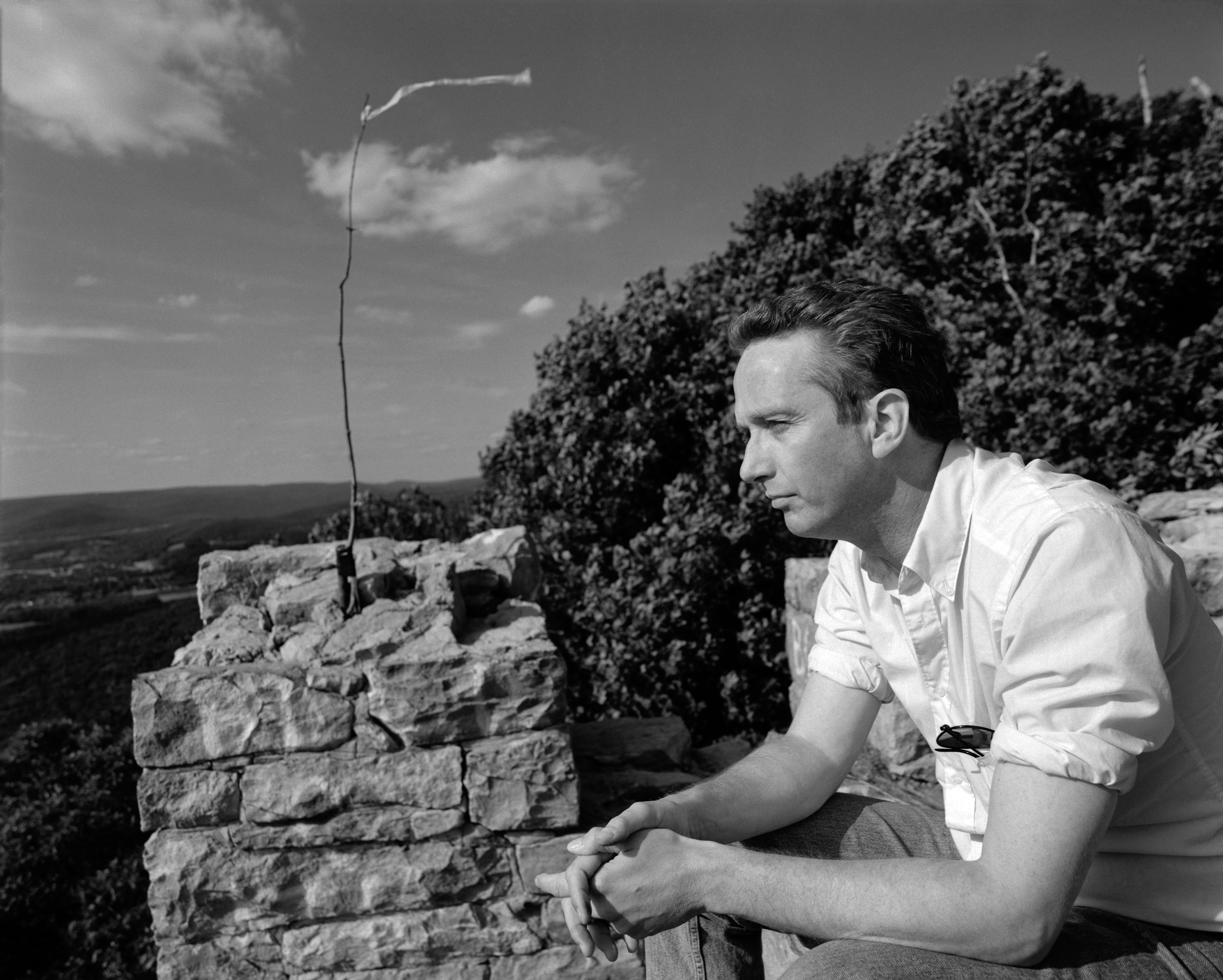
- Grazier in 1992
- Born: June 23, 1946; Long Beach, New York, U.S.
- Died: December 27, 2022 (aged 76); Shamokin, Pennsylvania, U.S.
- Occupation: Realist painter
- Children: 2, John and Rebecca

Instagram information
- Page: American Painter John Grazier

YouTube information
- Channel: American Painter John Grazier
- Website: https://johngrazier.art

John Grazier (June 23, 1946 – December 27, 2022) was an American realist painter, working with India ink airbrush, pencil and oil paint. He is an American artist of the late-20th century known for his meticulous cross-hatching technique, skewed perspective, and a "dreamlike" representation of seemingly ordinary subjects, such as buses, coffee cups, office buildings, Victorian-style porches, and phone booths.

== Early life and education ==
John Howard Grazier III was born in Long Beach, New York on June 23, 1946. His mother, Josephine Stine Grazier, attended Wellesley College in Wellesley, Massachusetts. She went on to receive an advanced degree at the Harvard Graduate School of Design.

His father, who served in World War II, owned the Bellevue Inn, a hotel in the Delaware Water Gap region of Pennsylvania. He was only two when his father was diagnosed with cancer, went bankrupt and died. Several of his paintings were based on his lingering childhood memories of his father's hotel.

In 1968, he went to study at Corcoran School of Art in Washington, D.C. From 1971 to 1972, he attended the Maryland Institute College of Art in Baltimore on a full scholarship.

== Career ==
Grazier was awarded grants from the National Endowment for the Arts in 1974 and from the Pollock-Krasner Foundation. He also won first place in the 1975 Davidson National Print and Drawing Competition.

=== Methods ===
Grazier started drawing images of coffee cups, buses, diners, tunnels and bridges at the beginning of his career in 1973.

In May 1980, Washington Post art critic Jo Ann Lewis described Grazier's technique and subject matter as:

“…Silent, unpeopled interiors with empty coffee cups, overlooking a parking lot full of buses… He starts with an overall design in his head, draws in the basic lines with a ruler and then fills in the images with free-hand cross-hatching that retains the integrity of each line...”

During the 1990s, his subject matter evolved further, focusing on facades of Victorian architecture buildings, railed porches and balconies, windows, elaborate moldings (“Porch of the Bellevue Inn”, “The Silence of the Attic”), phones (“Sunset Strip”) and drawing persons (“The Carousel of Dreams” in 1996).

In 2001, Grazier started working in color using oil paints.

=== Public collections ===
His works, “House on a Hill in a Dream” (1974) and “Memory of a Porch” (1976), are in the permanent collection of the Smithsonian American Art Museum. Another pencil drawing “End of the Line” (1980) is in the Art Institute of Chicago. “Breaking Up” (1976) and “Memory of a Porch (1975) are in the National Gallery of Art. The drawing “Passing Windows in Fall” is included in the Hechinger Collection “Tools as Art.” His works are also included in the permanent collections of the Library of Congress, the National Law Enforcement Museum in Washington, DC, and the Arkansas Arts Center. Two of his works, "Untitled" and "Rattling Windows", are included in the Pollock-Krasner Foundation image collection.

Grazier's works are also included in the following university collections: “City Lines” (1978) Rose Art Museum at Brandeis University in Waltham, Massachusetts, Davidson College in Davidson, North Carolina, Dartmouth College in Hanover, New Hampshire, the University of Rochester in Rochester, New York, and Wellesley College in Wellesley, Massachusetts.

His work has been purchased by many law firms and corporations. His work is also in the private collections of Jim Lehrer, Truland Systems (“Night of the Shooting Stars”, “Dreams of the Wild Child”, “Burning Bush”, "The Prosperous House", "Whispers in the Attic", “Rebecca’s Doll House”), (Note: Robert Truland paid $188,275 on March 28 for several paintings his company previously bought from galleries, including the Corcoran and Zenith and including "The Prosperous House" and "Whispers in the Attic" by John Grazier. Truland Group had acquired the paintings over more than 20 years, according to the court document.) Nixon Peabody, Hogan & Hartson (“The Visitor”, currently Hogan Lovells), Owens Corning Corporation (Toledo, Ohio), Cyrus and Myrtle Katzen family founders of the Katzen Arts Center at the American University in Washington, D.C.

=== One-Man shows ===
In 1974, he had his first one-man show at the Baltimore Museum of Art in Baltimore, which featured 22 pieces, including “Sound of the Wind". David Tannous of Washington Star-News wrote of that show: “Grazier deals almost exclusively with sections of architectural exteriors…his perspective twists and changes unpredictably from point to point and in several planes at once… because of this, Grazier’s buildings stretch and pull in different directions…small delicate strokes of the pencil multiply into many-layered cross-hatchings…“

His other one-man shows include: the Fendrick Gallery (“Memories of a Lady’s Lace”, “Tall Building”), in Washington, D.C. (1975) Davidson College in Davidson, North Carolina and the Lunn Gallery in Washington, D.C., (1980, “End of the Line”, “Empty Vessels”).

In September–October 1991, John Grazier had a one-man show named “A Ticket to ...”at the Zenith Gallery in Washington, D.C. Featured pieces included large airbrush India ink paintings on paper: “Echoes: Coaches Idling”, “Junk Yard Dogs”, “You Can’t Go Home Again”, “The Children Who Would Gallop”, “House on a Hill in a Dream."

=== Greyhound Bus Terminal Project ===
In the summer of 1990, Grazier had signed a $125,000 contract with the Canadian developer Manulife Real Estate to produce 18 black-and-white airbrush paintings for the Greyhound Bus Terminal lobby in Washington, D.C. The restoration of the terminal was part of an agreement with Manulife and area preservationists to keep the 1930s Art Deco building by architect William S. Arrasmith at 1100 New York Ave., N.W. intact as a lobby-entrance to a 12-story office building going up behind it.

Upon its reopening in 1991, the building's lobby featured enlarged photographs of the original 18 paintings featuring buses, coffee cups, lonely cityscapes and Mount Rushmore reflected in a bus windshield.

=== Exhibitions ===
Grazier's work has been included in many gallery exhibitions, including the Davidson National Print and Drawing Competition, Middendorf/Lane Gallery (Washington, DC), Foundry Gallery (“25 Washington Artists: Realism and Representation, Washington, DC), Corcoran Gallery of Art (Washington, DC), a United States Information Agency Tour of the Middle East, The Mint Museum (North Carolina), Washington Project for the Arts Exhibition. His urban landscape “Memory of a Trombone” has been exhibited at the Brooklyn Museum of Art (American Drawing in Black and White: 1970–80, Brooklyn, New York in 1980). His works have also been exhibited at the Southeastern Center for Contemporary Art (North Carolina), the Tampa Museum of Art (Florida), the Farragut West branch of Citibank in Washington, DC (“Sunset Strip,” “Where the Children Will Play,” “The Silence of the Attic,” “The Sound of the Wind,” “The Toy Chair,” “The Carousel of Dreams”).

In 1990, John Grazier was one of only two living artists represented in a show at DC's Adams-Davidson Gallery featuring “200 years of American Master Drawings.”

Grazier lived and worked in Shamokin, Pennsylvania. He was found dead in his home on December 28, 2022, and is believed to have suffered a fatal heart attack the day before.

== Selected works ==
| Title | Medium | Date | Collection | Dimensions | Image | Reference |
|---|---|---|---|---|---|---|
| House on a Hill in a Dream | Pencil on paper | 1974 | Smithsonian American Art Museum | 16 x 28 1/2 in.(40.6 x 72.4 cm) | "House on a Hill in a Dream" | |
| Memory of a Porch | Lithograph | 1976 | Smithsonian American Art Museum | 22 x 30 in.(55.9 x 76.2 cm) | | |
| Memory of a Porch | Lithograph | 1975 | National Gallery of Art | 22 1/8 x 29 15/16 in.(56.2 x 76.1 cm) | | |
| Breaking Up | Lithograph | 1976 | National Gallery of Art | 22 1/8 x 30 1/16 in.(56.2 x 76.3 cm) | | |
| End of the Line | Graphite with touches of erasing on paper | 1980 | Art Institute of Chicago | 26 3/4 x 36 2/3 in.(68 x 93.5 cm) | | |
| Untitled | India ink on paper | 1985 | The Pollock-Krasner Foundation | 40 x 60 in.(101.6 x 152.4 cm) | | |
| Rattling Windows | Pencil on paper | 1980 | The Pollock-Krasner Foundation | 30 x 40 in.(76.2 x 101.6 cm) | | |
| Cop Motors at Rest | Aquatint Etching | | National Law Enforcement Museum | | | |
| Passing Windows in Fall | Graphite on paper | 1983 | The Hechinger Collection | 28 x 38 in.(71.1 x 96.5 cm) | | |
| City Lines | Graphite on paper | 1978 | Rose Art Museum | 8 x 23 in.(20 x 58 cm) | | |
| Reflections of Mount Rushmore | India ink airbrush, photographs | 1991 | Lobby of 1100 New York Avenue NW Washington, DC | | | |
| Rebecca's Doll House | Oil on canvas | | Truland Systems | | | |
| Burning Bush | Oil on canvas | | Truland Systems | 30 x 40 in. (76.2 x 101.6 cm) | | |
| The Visitor | Oil on canvas | 2001 | Hogan Lovells, formerly known as Hogan & Hartson | | | |
