= Giolitti =

Café and pastry shop in Rome

Coordinates: 41.90107°N 12.47733°E

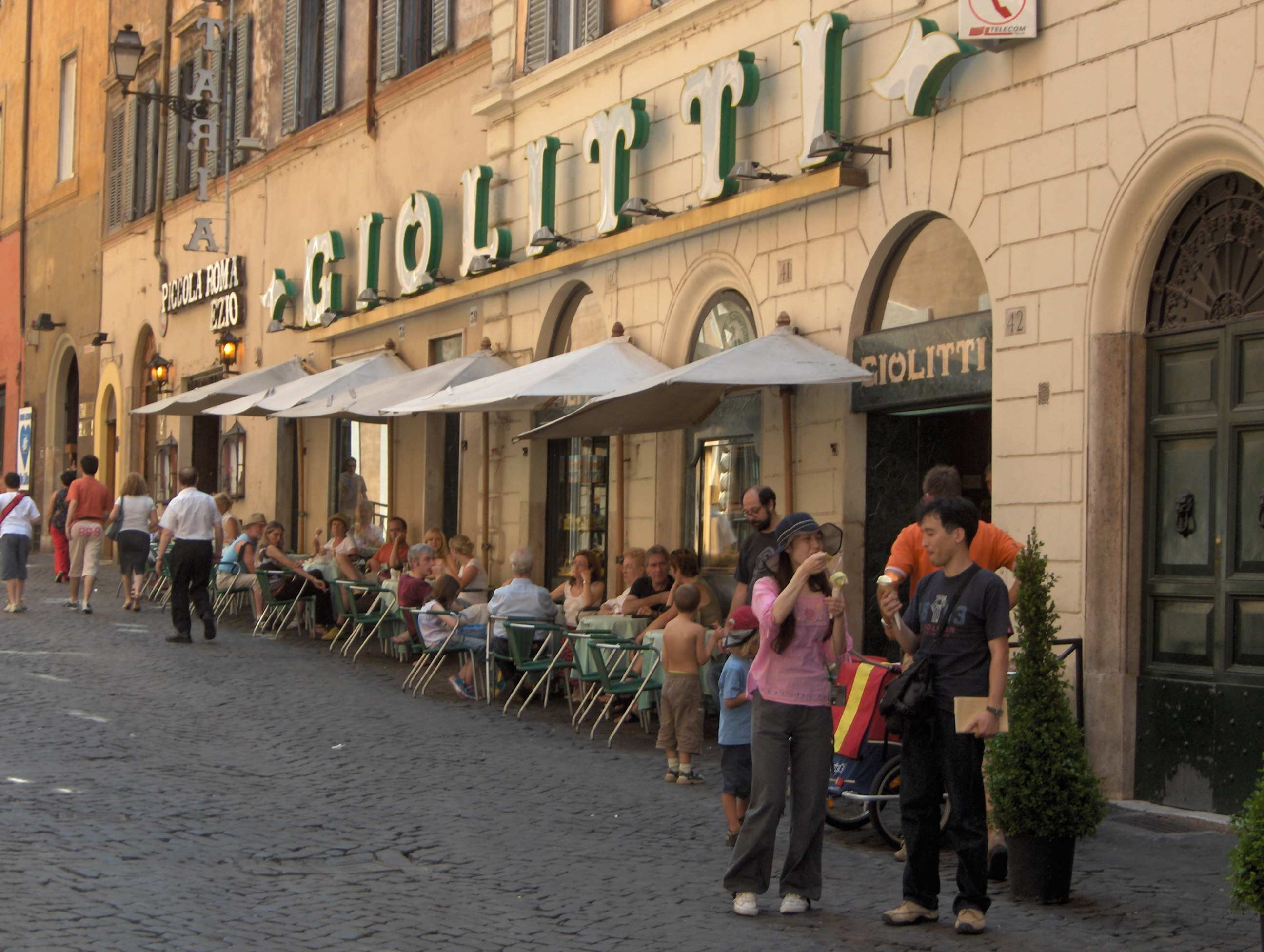
Giolitti at Via Uffici del Vicario in Rome, Italy.

Giolitti is a well-known café and pastry shop, and reportedly the oldest ice cream parlor in Rome, Italy. It was founded in 1890 by Giuseppe and Bernardina Giolitti and opened their first creamery in Salita del Grillo. Soon after, they became the supplier of the Italian royal family. It is still owned by the same family and operates at two locations: via Uffici del Vicario near the Pantheon and in E.U.R.
