= Kris Kuksi =

American artist (born 1973)

- Born: 1973 (age 52–53)
- Known for: Assemblages, painting, drawing
- Movement: Classical roots; related to Surrealism
- Website: kuksi.com

Kris Kuksi is an American artist. In 2006 he was among approximately fifty finalists in the Outwin Boochever Portrait Competition organised at the Smithsonian National Portrait Gallery.

== Education ==
Kuksi received his Master of Fine Arts from Fort Hays University in 2002.

== Work ==
Kuksi has studied with established artists in Italy, Austria and Spain, including participating in several international workshops including "Painting the Fantastic" with Robert Venosa in Italy, "Old Masters New Visions Seminar" with Philip Rubinov Jacobson in Austria and "Painting Dali's Garden", with Venosa in Spain.

He creates intricate sculptures made up of thousands of individual parts that he collects and re-shapes before putting them together in a cohesive design. The National Museum of the Marine Corps exhibits three of his sculptures.

In 2006 he was among approximately fifty finalists in the Outwin Boochever Portrait Competition organised at the Smithsonian National Portrait Gallery. His work was shown at the Pulse Art Fair in Los Angeles in 2011, and has appeared on the front covers of the magazines Philosophie and Bl!sss. The Ellis County Bar Association in Kansas owns one of his works.

== Critical response ==
In a review of his 2003 solo show at the Fraser Gallery in Washington, D.C., Michael O'Sullivan of the Washington Post described his images as "contrived to disturb and confront the viewer, which is probably why they don't".

== Books ==
His book Divination and Delusion (ISBN 9780980323139) was published in 2010 by Last Gasp. His second book, Conquest (ISBN 9780847860265), was published in 2017 by Rizzoli International Publications, Inc.
