= American Museum of the Cuban Diaspora =

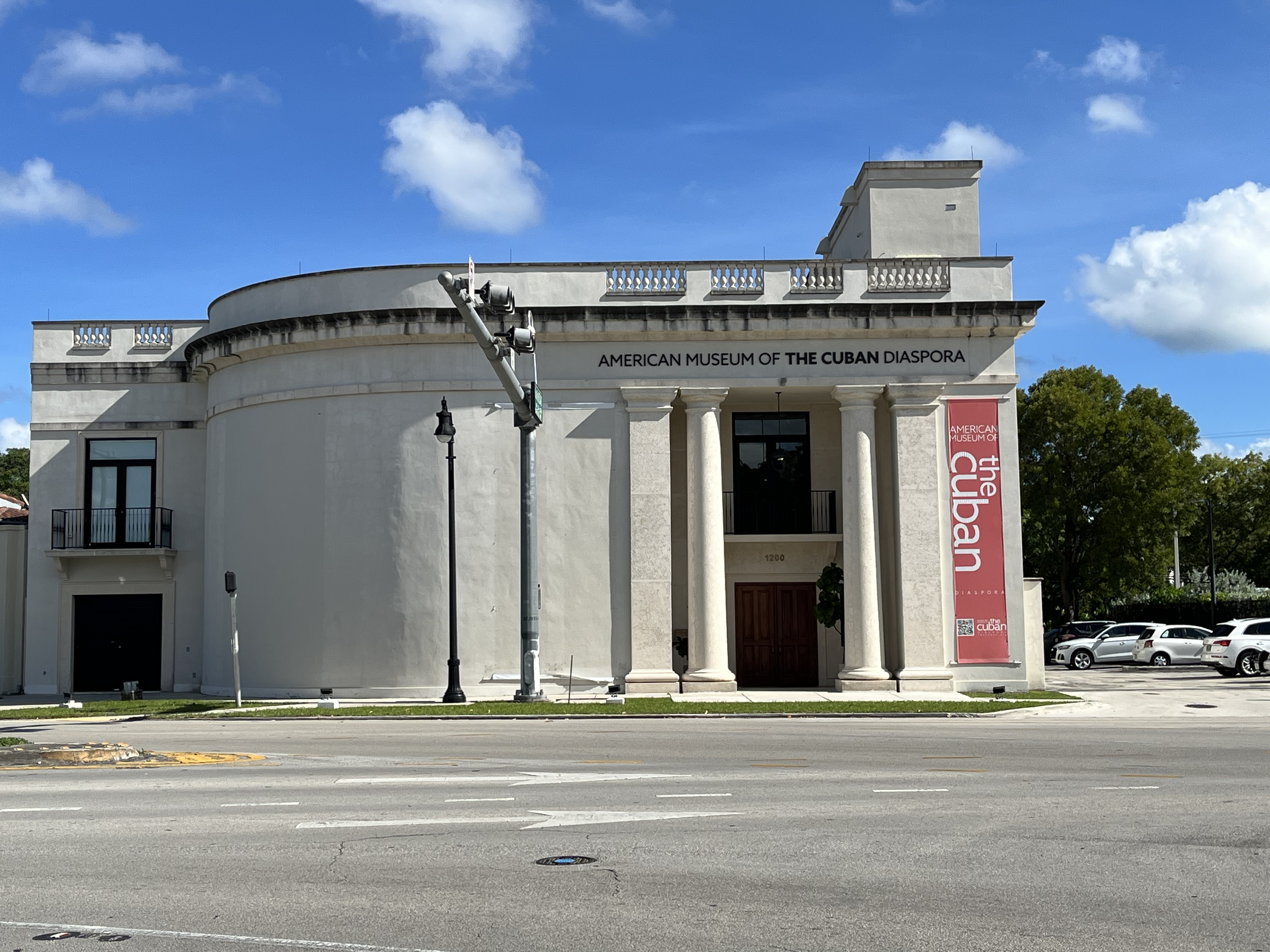
- American Museum of the Cuban Diaspora in Miami, Florida
- Established: 1996
- Location: 1200 Coral Way, Miami, Florida 33145
- Coordinates: 25.7508°N 80.2143°W
- Founders: Dr. Ofelia Tabares, Luis Botifoll, Hilario Candela
- Website: thecuban.org

The American Museum of the Cuban Diaspora or The Cuban, is a Miami, Florida museum dedicated to the history and culture of those who left Cuba due to the rise of communism. The museum was established to preserve and promote the artistic, historical, and cultural contributions of Cubans living abroad primarily focusing on those who settled in the United States following the Cuban Revolution of 1959.

== Founding ==
The Cuban was established in 1996 by Dr. Ofelia Tabares and other Cuban-American community leaders. It first operated as "museum without walls" meaning it had no set location. The Cuban opened its building at 1200 Coral Way with a soft launch in 2016 and a grand opening in 2018.

== Mission ==
The Cuban is dedicated to sharing the history and culture of exiles who left Cuba due to the rise of communism. Its permanent exhibit is about the History of Cuba and of Cuban exiles.

It also houses temporary exhibitions. Its 2021 exhibit, Operation Pedro Pan: The Cuban Children's Exodus, recounted the story of more than 14,000 children who escaped Cuba without their parents between the years 1960 and 1962.

The museum is a nonprofit, tax-exempt organization. It was established with funds from Building Better Communities bond program and received financial support from the Miami-Dade County.
