= Joseph Craig English =

American artist

- Born: 1947 (age 78–79)
- Education: Virginia Commonwealth University
- Occupation: Artist
- Known for: Landscape Painting

Joseph Craig English is an American artist (born 1947 in Washington, DC) predominantly known for his silkscreen prints focusing on street and landscape scenery of and about places around the Greater Washington, DC area. He currently resides and works in the historic community of Washington Grove, Maryland.

== Education ==
He received a BFA in Communication Arts and Design in 1970 from the School of Art at Virginia Commonwealth University in Richmond, VA.

== Artwork ==
According to the artist, he was introduced to silkscreen printing in his ninth grade art class. Subsequently, and since 1972, he has been showing and selling his artwork at outdoor arts festivals throughout the country as well as regional exhibitions. In focusing his art on the scenes around his region and the capital area, the artist has been described as "local color adopts new meaning with this celebrated DC-area printmaker. English found fame by focusing on what we see every day but so often take for granted."

Though his streetscapes now include places in Richmond, New York, North Carolina and California, the artist has become associated with the Greater Washington capital region via hundreds of silkscreens of familiar sights to Washingtonians. The Washington Post noted about his work: "Craig’s work is instantly recognizable. His specialty is screen printing, and he has a distinctive style, photorealistic, with crisp edges and blocks of bright color: buildings, neighborhoods, street scenes, sports scenes . . ." His work was described in a 2013 show at the Betty Mae Kramer Gallery in Silver Spring, MD as "a bold and beautiful display of artworks that explore community–here in Montgomery County..." Curator Dr. Michele Cohen noted about his work:

English directs our attention to the play of light and shadow, leaf patterns, and architectural ornaments that might go unnoticed. He often focuses on doorways, cars, signage, window frames, and stoops, recasting his subjects into bold color compositions built from successive printings, sometimes with as many as forty colors.

His work is in the permanent collection of several museums, including the Virginia Museum of Fine Arts, Chrysler Museum of Art, Fort Lauderdale Museum, and the Museum of Western Virginia. It is also included in the public collections of the City of Baltimore, DC Commission of the Arts, Georgetown University, IBM, Microsoft, U.S. State Department, Montgomery County, MD, The Washington Post, Xerox and others. In 2012, the Washington Metro Airports Authority commissioned him to create an edition of original serigraphs to mark the 50th Anniversary of Dulles Airport.

In 2020, he created an outdoor mural for the city of Falls Church, Virginia.
