= Michael B. Platt =

American artist (1948–2019)

- Born: 1948
- Died: January 20, 2019 (aged 70–71); Washington, D.C., U.S.
- Education: Columbus School of Art & Design Howard University
- Occupations: Artist, art professor

Michael B. Platt was an American artist (1948 – January 20, 2019) and art professor. Platt was predominantly known as a printmaker and photographer. He was born, worked, lived most of his life, and died in Washington, DC.

== Education ==
Platt received his degrees in Fine art from the Columbus School of Art & Design in Ohio (BFA 1970), and Howard University (MFA 1973) in Washington, DC.

== Work ==
Although Platt worked for years as a printmaker and photographer, his exhibitions in his final years tended to be multi-media in nature. He taught at the Alexandria Campus of Northern Virginia Community College for more than 30 years and subsequently at Howard University for more than 10 years, where "he introduced digital photography and non-toxic printmaking into the school’s Fine Art curriculum." He is considered by many to be one of the most influential DC artists and art professors of the last few decades. During his life he exhibited his artwork in solo and group shows in museums, art centers, and galleries in both the United States and other nations such as Australia, Viet Nam, Ukraine, Greece, Slovenia, the United Kingdom, Italy, and France.

In 2003 Howard University's James A. Porter Colloquium commissioned Platt to create the inaugural print for its 2004 conference.

In 2004 he was part of the DC Print Portfolio Project, sponsored by the District of Columbia Commission on the Arts and Humanities.

In 2006 Platt was commissioned to create work for the exhibition organized by the Reginald F. Lewis Museum of Maryland African-American History & Culture in Baltimore in collaboration with the Maryland Historical Society and the Maryland Institute College of Art for their multi-venue 2007 exhibit, "At Freedom's Door: Challenging Slavery in Maryland."

In 2015, Platt and his wife, poet Carol A. Beane, exhibited Ritual +Time Travel = Rebirth: Images and Words by Michael B. Platt and Carol A. Beane at the Sonya Haynes Stone Center of the University of North Carolina, Charlotte, NC.

In 2019, "Influences and Connections", also an exhibition with his wife at the American University Museum, was described as: “although not a retrospective, did become a sort of summation” of his career. A second reviewer noted that "Platt’s images are multifaceted, richly layered and textured, and require deep gazing to register all the elements present in just one piece."

Most recently, in 2020 his work was included in the "Art and Authenticity in the Age of Fake news," a virtual exhibition organized by the American University Museum. His portrait of Angela Davis was described as containing "jarring, furious scratches in the black-and-white engraving allude to the violence that Davis experienced growing up in Alabama under Jim Crow laws."

== Collections ==
Platt's artwork is in the permanent collections of the former Corcoran Gallery of Art (now transferred to the American University Art Museum), the Smithsonian Museum of American Art, the Library of Congress’ Prints and Photographs Collection and its Rare Books and Special Collections, the Schomburg Research Center in Black Culture of the New York Public Library, the Yale University Art Gallery, the RISD Museum, the Harris Poetry Collection of the Rockefeller Library of Brown University, the David C. Driskell Center Collection of the University of Maryland, and the Hampton University Museum.

== Press ==
Platt's work was widely reviewed and received significant press attention during his career. For his most recent exhibition, which opened a few days after his unexpected death, The Washington Post wrote: “In recent years, his imagination was sparked by the culture of a people who could hardly live farther away: Australia’s Aboriginal people.” A few years earlier, the same newspaper described his work as "striking."

In discussing Platt's life in the Washington City Paper, protégée Lyric Prince noted that "…[his life] story ...is longer than the 70 years he was physically on this earth; it contains the history of Jim Crow and of civil rights, to the point where we are at now. The thrust behind every technique that Platt used was the story of struggle, victory, and humanity; of blackness taking different forms in the world over, and the ability to characterize any person within that story with empathy and respect."

In 2019, American art critic Donald Kuspit wrote: “All of Platt’s works are aesthetic masterpieces, ingeniously integrating figuration and abstraction, light and shadow, planes of color and incisive line."

== Awards ==
Platt was the 1999 winner of the Washington, DC Mayor's Art Award for Excellence in Artistic Discipline, and also the Dorothy Frost Award for Digital Printmaking, Hampton University Museum, in 2008. He was also a 2007 recipient of the prestigious Franz and Virginia Bader Fund Grant.
