= Sandra Ramos =

Cuban artist (born 1969)

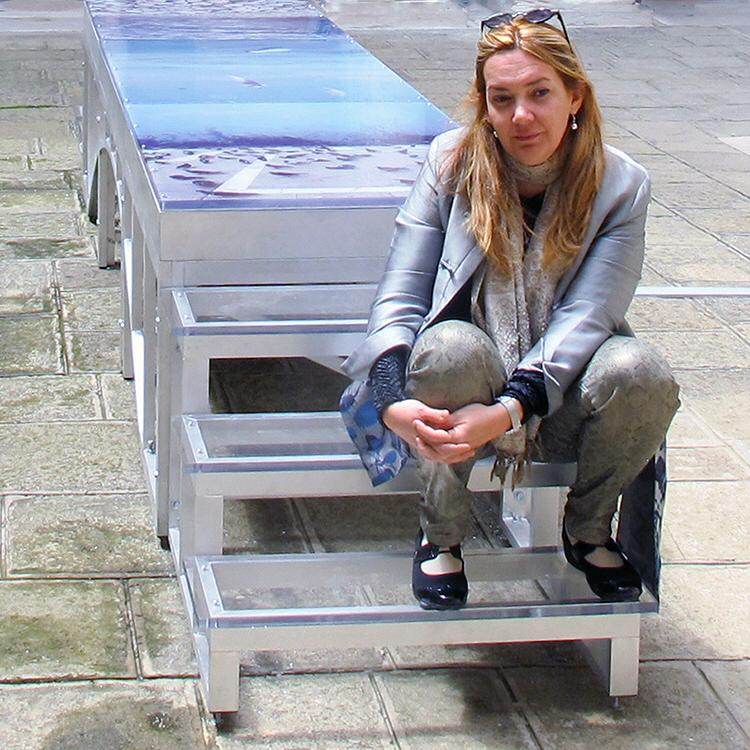
- Ramos in her installation 50 Miles at 55th Venice Biennial. Cuban Pavilion. Venice National Archeological Museum at St. Mark’s Square.
- Born: Sandra Ramos Lorenzo; 1969 (age 56–57); Havana, Cuba
- Education: Instituto Superior de Arte, Havana, Cuba
- Known for: Engraving, printmaking, painting, drawing, film
- Website: www.sandraramosart.com

Sandra Ramos (born Oct, 1969) is a Cuban artist, a contemporary painter, printmaker, collagist, video and installation artist who explores nationality, gender, and identity in her work. She is known for works featuring her character of the Cuban Pioneer girl, who is composed of a self-portrait and an appropriated portion of an old illustration from 1895' L' illustration French magazine. Ramos currently lives in Miami, Florida, and serves as an artist in residence at Bakehouse Art Complex. Previously, she was a resident artist at the Fountainhead Art Studios. She is also a renowned curator in Cuba, and she won a national award for her curatorial work on the exhibition La Huella Múltiple (Multiple Fingerprint) in 2003 from the Consejo Nacional de las Artes Plásticas (CNAP) in Havana, Cuba.

== Early life and education ==
Sandra Ramos Lorenzo was born in Havana, Cuba to two native Cuban parents, and she now lives in Miami, Florida. She was heavily inspired to become an artist by the painter Gloria González, the grandmother of Ramos's close childhood friend, curator Wendy Navarro. Ramos has two siblings living in their family home in Miramar, Havana. Her sister, Liane, gives tours of Ramos' Havana studio and runs small xylographic workshops as her assistant. Ramos' brother Ruben also helps to run a printmaking workshop at the studio.

From 1984 to 1988, Ramos studied art at the Escuela Nacional de Bellas Artes "San Alejandro", which was attended by Camilo Cienfuegos and Jose Martí, and from 1988 to 1993 attaining a degree in printmaking at the Superior Institute of Art in Havana where she was in contact with artists including José Bedia, Leandro Soto and Carlos Cárdenas. In 2020–21, Sandra Ramos finished a Master's in Fine Arts at San Francisco Art Institute. She is now working as an art professor at Florida International University.

== Career ==
Ramos had her first solo exhibition in 1993, “Manera de matar las soledades” at el Centro de Desarrollo de las Artes Visuales (CDAV) in Havana, Cuba. and also had her first solo international show and representation at Nina Menocal Gallery in Mexico DF.

Ramos' career as an artist began during Cuba's "Special Period" following the dissolution of the Soviet Union (USRR) and the embargo that the United States imposed on Cuba. Many people left Cuba, including her then-partner who left in 1992. Ramos stated, "It was a very hard time for me… I had to decide whether I was going to follow him or not." Ramos decided to stay. The personal experiences that derived from these hardships are what propelled the content of her work, which communicated a sense of isolation, grief, and loss. In 2003, the artist hinted at the way in which her experiences of living in Cuba affected her art by saying, "My work is too related to my life there and my life would change a lot if I left."

In 1993 Sandra Ramos became a teacher at the ISA - Higher Institute of Art, a job that she held up until 1998. Since then, she has continued her involvement in the art world. According to her website, she has been curator of the 7 editions of La Huella Múltiple event and other Cuban contemporary art exhibitions. She imparted conferences and workshops in international institutions and universities such as the CUNY Graduate Center of New York, the Wake Forest University of Winston-Salem, the George Mason University of Fairface County, the University of Havana, the École nationale supérieure des Beaux-Arts of Paris, the Barbican Center of London, the School of the Fine Arts Museum in Boston, Lowe Art Museum and University of Florida in Miami, Fuchu Art Museum, Tokyo.

Ramos' attempted to enter the United States in 2004 for her first solo gallery exhibition in the U.S. at the Fraser Gallery Georgetown. However, her visit was forbidden by the U.S. department of state because "in a bid to increase pressure for democratic change in Cuba by drying up the flow of hard currency to the Castro regime, the U.S. government had tightened restrictions on travel by Cuban artists to the United States."

In February 2014, Ramos moved to Miami, Florida to work as an artist in residence at The Fountain Head Art Studios, and, in September 2016, she began a second residency at the Bakehouse Art Complex also located in Miami, both of which she still maintains.

In 2014, Sandra Lorenzo Ramos Studios released the book Sandra Ramos: bridging the past, present and future, which was the first major English publication about Ramos, authored by the artist with contribution from Diane W. Camber, Jack Rasmussen, Hamlet Fernández, Holly Block, American University, and the Bass Museum of Art. This book was released in conjunction with the exhibition of the same name at American University Museum at the Katzen Arts Center.

=== Exhibitions (selection) ===
Ramos' work has been exhibited in solo and group exhibitions at Pan American Art Projects in Miami, the Harn Museum of Art at the University of Florida, the Phoenix Art Museum, The David Rockefeller Center at Harvard University, Arizona State University Art Museum, and Accola Griefen Gallery in New York City.

=== Collections (selection) ===
Ramos’ works have been incorporated into the permanent collections of many museums, including the Museum of Modern Art in New York, the Museum of Fine Arts, Boston, Pérez Art Museum Miami (Acuario from 2013), and the Fuchu Art Museum in Japan. Ramos' work is also a part of the Rodríguez Collection at the Kendall Art Center in Miami, Florida. Ramos’ works featuring her character Ariadne have sold for as much as 833% above their estimated value.

== Style and technique ==
Ramos uses a variety of mediums for her art, which include, paintings, etchings, collage, installations, and digital animation. However, the medium for which she is most renowned is woodblock printing. Ramos first learned engraving techniques at her high school and still uses some of the same techniques. Most commonly Ramos produces images using aquatint, an etching technique that only produces areas of tone rather than lines. When speaking about what artistic medium she prefers, Ramos stated: "While engraving (woodblock) continues to be my favorite medium, I wanted to expand the expressive and communicative potential of my work through a new digital medium. Digital animation allows me to elevate my storytelling capabilities by creating a temporal continuity for my small vignettes".

== Themes ==
Ramos has been explicit about how her art, not only intersects with social, political, and global issues, but also is made with intent of making a critical statement about the future. She does this by using a paradox of contradictions of idealism. In her art, she expresses deep feelings of loss and mourning that are associated with choices of her family, friends, and her partner in life. She explores the trauma that came with the break of all of these ties and the consequent feelings of loneliness and hopelessness that ensued.

In addition, she is known for the visual expression of her relationship to Cuba's political and social realities, especially those that relate to the Cuban diaspora. Throughout her body of work, the artist uses familiar characters from literature, history, and folklore that not only creates context for her work, but also voices her political or social opinions.

One common motif in her work is using a character of the Cuban Pioneer girl. The artist presents it as a young girl whose visage seems innocent, guiltless, and unaware of life's struggles. The character's face is a self-portrait of the artist that is utilized in a surreal context similar to that of the protagonist from Alice in Wonderland. The artist appropriates this fictional context to make commentary on life in contemporary Cuba. Her work lends itself to be a narrative that plays on the adventures of Alice in Wonderland, but instead her character is a childlike explorer of Cuba under the Fidel Castro regime.

By choosing to name her character Ariadne in some of her prints, Ramos alludes at Greek mythology. Ariadne is the name of the goddess who is the daughter of King Minos of Crete and his wife Pasiphae. In her story, she falls in love with Athenian hero, Theseus, and plays a crucial role in helping him slay the Minotaur. In return, she expects him to marry her and to take her back to Athens. However, Theseus abandons Ariadne on the island of Naxos (Connor).

Another common theme in Ramos’ piece is the use of water that emphasizes a physical separation to express a sense of isolation and to, as well as demonstrating the fluidity in her life.

== Awards and recognition ==
2013- Invited Artist. La Biennale di Venezia. Venice, Italy.

2012- Invited Artist. XI Habana Biennial. Havana, Cuba.

2003- Nacional Award for the Curatorial Work on the exhibition La Huella Múltiple (Multiple Fingerprint) granted by the Consejo Nacional de las Artes Plásticas (CNAP). Havana, Cuba.

2002 - Award. Best exhibition of the year to La Huella Múltiple (Multiple Fingerprint), Gallery 106 Flatbed Press. Austin, Texas, USA.

1997- Cuban National Cultural Award. Havana, Cuba.

1993- National Print Award. Havana, Cuba.

La Joven Estampa Award. Casa de las Américas. Havana, Cuba.

1991- Award. International Contest of Small Prints Interchange (Premio del Concurso Internacional de Intercambio de Pequeñas Estampas, CIPE). Havana, Cuba.

1988 - Award. National Saloon for Artistic Teaching (Premio Salón Nacional de Enseñanza Artística) Academia de San Alejandro. Havana, Cuba.

== Critical reception ==
When speaking about the artist, Cuban art critic and curator Gerardo Mosquera, Ramos is “.. an artist who surrenders her biography, her most intimate feelings and her own body to discuss social, political and cultural problems, has said of her work…She uses her portrait to personify the Cuban flag, the island, establishing a parallel between her personal situation and the suffering of her own country."

Mayer Fine Art Gallery in Norfolk, Virginia, calls Ramos's work “groundbreaking” and says she is “amongst the first to challenge and expose the harsh realities of Cuban life. By addressing forbidden issues such as mass migration, the plight of Cuba’s raft people, racism in Cuban society and the inequalities of Cuban life, Ramos found a voice through her art that has brought her worldwide fame.”

In 2017, an exhibition featuring Ramos’ work, “On the Horizon: Contemporary Cuban Art,” at the Pérez Art Museum Miami received criticism from Miami's Cuban exile community for its inclusion works by artists who depict the island fondly before it even opened. They reconciled this by inviting guests to leave comments negative or positive in English or Spanish at the museum.

== Political Controversy ==
After a fiery debate on July 15, 2021, Coral Gables Mayor Vince Lago labeled Ramos a communist sympathizer and the popular “Illuminate Coral Gables” 2022 art show, of which she was a part, was canceled. Mayor Lago stated, “I will continue to support the arts, but not at the expense of democracy and liberty."
