= Marsha Mateyka Gallery =

Fine arts gallery in Washington D.C., US

Coordinates: 38.91240°N 77.04590°W

Marsha Mateyka Gallery was a fine arts gallery in Washington, DC between 1983 and 2023. The gallery was established in 1983 by art historian Marsha Perry Mateyka. The gallery focused generally on national and regional contemporary artists. The gallery was located at 2012 R Street NW, Washington DC 20009.

== Artists represented ==
As one of the oldest art galleries in the city, the gallery represented approximately 20 well-known contemporary artists, including Jae Ko, Jim Sanborn, Athena Tacha, William T. Wiley, Christopher French, Sam Gilliam, and the Estates of Gene Davis and Nathan Oliveira.

== Critical reception ==
Exhibitions at the gallery were widely reviewed over the years by both local newspapers such as The Washington Post, Washington City Paper, and The Washington Times, as well as by national art magazines. The gallery can also be credited with playing a pivotal part in the revival in the interest in the work of major American artist Sam Gilliam, whom the gallery has represented for several decades.
