= Adah Rose Gallery =

Fine arts gallery in Maryland, US

Coordinates: 39.0277°N 77.0741°W

Adah Rose Gallery is a fine arts gallery in Kensington, Maryland, a suburb of Washington, DC, and part of the Greater Washington, DC capital area. The gallery was established in 2011 and represents local, regional and national artists. The gallery is located at 3766 Howard Ave, Kensington, MD 20895.

== Artists represented ==
The gallery represents several well-known national-level artists such as Jessica Drenk, Gregory Ferrand, Sheila Giolitti, Joan Belmar, and about a dozen others. In addition to monthly exhibitions in its Kensington space, the gallery also conducts "pop up" shows in various locations around the capital region area.

== Critical reception ==
As one of the few art galleries in the Greater Washington area which regularly participates in national art fairs, the gallery's exhibitions have received significant critical coverage in the press, and the national art fairs have given its exhibition program a wide international audience. Its shows are regularly reviewed by the major Greater Washington, DC newsmedia.
