= Zenith Gallery =

Art gallery in Washington, DC, US

Coordinates: 38.9824°N 77.0346°W

- Established: 1978
- Location: Washington D.C., U.S.
- Type: Art gallery

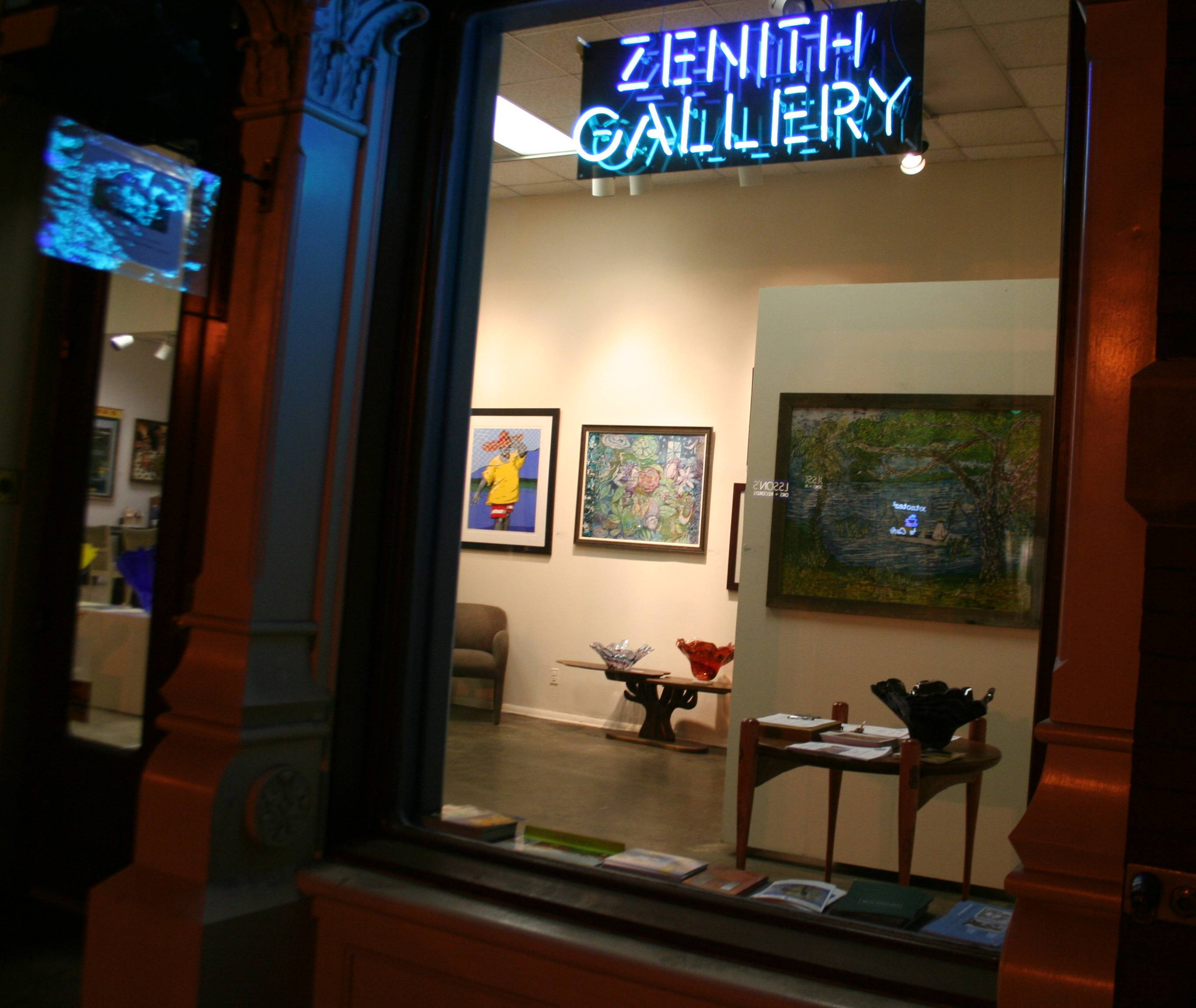
Zenith Gallery window

Zenith Gallery is a fine arts gallery in Washington, D.C.

== History ==
The gallery was established in 1978 by artist and former Washington, D.C. Art Commissioner Margery E. Goldberg. Since its beginning, the gallery has relocated several times and it is currently located at 1429 Iris Street NW, Washington D.C. Goldberg also programs art for the lobby at 1111 Pennsylvania Ave. NW.

The gallery is one of the oldest continuously operating galleries in the city and was honored in 2018 by the Council of the District of Columbia in a ceremony in celebration of the 40th anniversary of the gallery, and in "recognition for its contributions to the District of Columbia and the Greater Washington Metropolitan Area."

== Artists represented ==
Zenith Gallery has exhibited or represents both regional, national and international artists, including John Grazier, Sylvia Snowden, Robert Freeman, Anne Marchand, Bradley Stevens, Curtis Woody, Christopher Malone, Stephen Hansen, Alan Binstock, Beatriz Blanco, Renee duRocher, Joel D'Orazio, Joan Konkel, Donna McCullough, Davis Morton, Paula Stern, Erwin Timmers, Paul Martin Wolff, and others.

== Notable exhibitions ==
In a 1979 review of artist Sylvia Snowden, The Washington Post art critic highlighted that Snowden "sought specifically to express the agony of displacement, poverty and neglect which afflicts the people in her downtown Washington neighborhood." In a 1991 review of artist John Grazier, the same newspaper's art critic and observed that "there's a 'You Can't Go Home Again' quality to Grazier's many paintings of handsome clapboard houses, whose owners -- like the tenant of the open bird cage on a windowsill -- seem to have long ago flown the coop.

In 2004, Washington City Paper's photography critic highlighted the then novel use of Photoshop "cranked up to 11" in an exhibit by photographer David Glick.

In 2018, The Washington Post highlighted the exhibition "celebrating" the gallery's 40th anniversary. In 2022, immediately following the death of American actress Betty White, the gallery organized an impromptu exhibition in homage to White titled Betty White Unites!. The curator and gallery director noted that “This country is so, so, so divided, but I thought [the exhibit] would be something that unites people."
