= Lida Moser =

American-born photographer and author

- Born: August 17, 1920; New York City
- Died: August 11, 2014 (aged 93); Rockville, Maryland
- Occupations: Photographer, author
- Years active: 1947–2014
- Known for: Photojournalism, portraiture, fashion, experimental, street photography
- Notable work: Judy and the Boys, 1961

Lida Moser (August 17, 1920 – August 11, 2014) was an American photographer and author, with a career that spanned more than six decades, before retiring in her 90s. She was known for her photojournalism and street photography as a member of both the Photo League and the New York School. Her portfolio includes black and white commercial, portrait, landscape, experimental, abstract, and documentary photography, with her work continuing to have an impact.

The Photo League was an early center of American documentary photography in the post war years, with membership including many of the most significant photographers of the 20th century. In a retrospective at the Fraser Gallery in Washington DC, she was described as a pioneer in the field of photojournalism, and The New York Times noted that she "excelled at photojournalism at a time when women were a rarity in the field." She has been also described, much to Moser's annoyance, as the "grandmother of American photojournalism."

== Career ==
Moser was born in 1920 in New York City. Her career started in 1947 as an assistant in Berenice Abbott's studio. She then earned her first assignment from Vogue in 1949, traveling to Scotland and then across Canada. Other magazines subsequently featuring her work included Harper's Bazaar, Look, Esquire, and others. She authored a number of books of her own work, and co-authored several photographic technique books. Articles and ongoing columns appeared also in the New York Times, New York Sunday Times, Amphoto Guide to Special Effects, Fun in Photography, Career Photography, Women See Men, Women of Vision and This Was the Photo League, among others.

Moser's series of "Camera View" articles on photography for The New York Times appeared between 1974 and 1981. Her photography has fetched as much as $4,000 at Christie's and other auctions and continues to be collected and displayed by more than 40 museums worldwide. Moser's relationship to French photographer Eugène Atget can be seen in her photographs of Edinburgh as an early influence and that of American photographer Walker Evans.

Moser was a close friend of American artist Alice Neel, and she photographed Neel several times; in return Neel painted multiple portraits of Moser, which now hang is several museums in the U.S.

=== Scotland ===
In 1949 Moser was assigned by Vogue magazine to travel to Scotland and photograph Scottish writers and artists. Over 100 of those photographs are now in the permanent collection of The National Galleries of Scotland.

=== Canada ===
Vogue was so pleased with the result of Moser's work in Scotland, that a year later, in 1950, they assigned the young photographer an even more ambitious task: to visit the Canadian province of Quebec and deliver a photographic essay on Quebec. During the summer of that year, "Moser travelled all along the St. Laurence River, from Montreal to Quebec City, then on to Charlevoix, the lower Saint-Lawrence and the Gaspé peninsula." She then returned later in 1950, this time under assignment by Look magazine, to photograph "the inhabitants – everyday people, children, artists, storytellers, actors, lovers and more." A documentary of her Canadian travels and photographs was written and directed by Joyce Borenstein, and was released in 2017 under the title Lida Moser Photographer: Odyssey in Black and White.

=== Judy and the Boys ===
"Judy and the Boys (Mimicry)" Photograph by Lida Moser, 1961.

According to The New York Times, "Perhaps her most famous photograph, "Mimicry (Judy and the Boys)" (1961), began as a shoot for an aspiring model. Ms. Moser had posed her in front of a Greenwich Village garage when some neighborhood children demanded to be in the picture, then they began mimicking the model's poses. The model responded with a crude gesture, captured by Ms. Moser." In discussing the same photograph, The Washington City Paper wrote: "The piece typifies Moser’s work: It captures a moment in which people have let their guard down and are acting genuinely, features details of a long-vanished New York, and clearly displays the empathy Moser felt toward her subjects." The Library of Congress purchased one of the original vintage prints in 1998."

=== New York ===
As a New Yorker most of her life, Moser photographed her city continuously for several decades. Her New York City photographs are an example of the variety and diversity of subjects that characterized Moser's work throughout her life; it includes dynamic portraits of the people of New York: prostitutes of both sexes, firefighters, police, street hustlers, tourists, actors, musicians, composers, celebrities, etc. They include portraits of Leonard Bernstein, Charles Mingus, Judy Collins, Alexey Brodovitch, John Koch, Yousuf Karsh, and many others. It also includes hundreds of photographs of daily New York life, its frenetic pace, traffic, parks, and buildings. Moser also carefully documented the 1970s tear-down of the neighborhood where the World Trade Center was eventually erected as well as the construction of the Center itself.

=== Later life ===
Moser spent the last decades of her life in Rockville, Maryland and had several solo shows in the last few years of her life in the Washington, DC area, all of which were well received by art critics, collectors, and museum curators. She died on August 11, 2014, in Rockville, Maryland, six days shy of her 94th birthday. A large retrospective of her photographs was organized by Dickinson College in 2018, with the Smithsonian Institution loaning the college roughly 500 Moser prints.

== Publications ==
- Earthman, Come Home (1966)
- A Life For the Stars (Cities in Flight, 2) (Avon SF, G1280) (1968)
- Construction of the Exxon Building, New York (1971)
- Fun in Photography, Amphoto U.S. (1974) ISBN 978-0-8174-056-49
- Amphoto Guide to Special Effects, Watson-Guptill Pubns (1980) ISBN 978-0-8174-352-40
- Photography Contests: How to Enter, How to Win, Amphoto U.S. (1981) ISBN 978-0-8174-244-59
- Grants in Photography: How to Get Them (1979) ISBN 978-0-8174-244-59
- Quebec a l'ete 1950 Libre Expression, French edition (1982) ISBN 978-2-8911-111-02
- Career Photography: How to Be a Success As a Professional Photographer, Prentice Hall (1983)ISBN 978-0-13115-11-30

== Significant works ==
- 1949 "Queen's Parade, Edinburgh, Scotland"
- 1949 "John Boyd Orr, Baron Boyd Orr"
- 1949 "Douglas Young"
- 1949 "Stanley Cursiter"
- 1949 "Dovecot Studios, Edinburgh Tapestry Company"
- 1950 "Farm Girls, Valley of the Matapedia, Quebec"
- 1950 "Two students of Quebec City's Ecole Moderne pose with sculptures"
- 1961 "Judy and the Boys"
- 1965 "Office Bldg. Lobby, New York"
- 1968 "Cops, Times Square, New York"
- 1971 "Construction of the Exxon Building, New York'

== Collections ==
Moser's work is in the following permanent collections:

- Museum of Modern Art, New York City
- A portrait of Moser, by painter Alice Neel, is in the permanent collection of the Metropolitan Museum of Art in New York City.
- Corcoran Gallery, Washington, DC
- Phillips Collection, Washington, DC
- Bibliothèque et Archives nationales du Québec, Quebec, Canada
- Library of Congress, Washington, DC
- Library and Archives Canada, Ottawa, Canada
- National Galleries of Scotland, Edinburgh, Scotland
- Department of Image Collections, National Gallery of Art Library, Washington, DC
- National Portrait Gallery, London, United Kingdom
- National Portrait Gallery, Washington, DC
- New York Historical Society, New York
- Smithsonian Institution, Washington, DC
- Museum of Fine Arts, Houston, Texas
- Crystal Bridges Museum of American Art, Bentonville, Arkansas
- Nelson-Atkins Museum of Art, Kansas City, Missouri
- Ryerson Image Centre, Toronto, Canada
- Trout Gallery at Dickinson College, Carlisle, Pennsylvania

== In popular culture ==
Moser's 1971 book "Construction of Exxon Building, New York City" features a photo of window washers that has been recreated in Lego building blocks at Legoland Florida theme park.

Office Building Lobby, New York, in which Moser's wild overexposure has reduced organization men to near–stick figures and the lobby to an ill-defined blob, presaging by several years the visual distortions of 2001: A Space Odyssey.
