= Maxwell MacKenzie =

Architectural and a fine arts photographer

- Born: Fergus Falls, MN
- Education: Bennington College
- Occupation: Photographer
- Style: Landscape and aerial photography
- Website: maxwellmackenzie.com

Maxwell MacKenzie is an architectural and a fine arts photographer.

Three books have been published containing the landscape and aerial photography of MacKenzie.

== Life and work ==
MacKenzie received a Bachelor of Arts degree from Bennington College in Vermont in 1975, with a dual major in architecture and photography. He was born in Fergus Falls, Minnesota, but has worked out of Washington, D.C. since the 1980s, and is married to art dealer Rebecca Cross. They currently live in Hillsboro, Virginia.

=== Architectural photographer ===
MacKenzie's commercial and architectural photographs have been published in books, magazines and brochures worldwide, including over 500 covers.

=== Art photographer ===
MacKenzie’s landscape photographs have been widely exhibited in galleries and museums nationwide, and his art photographs are part of the permanent collections of the American Embassies in Bogota, Colombia, Abidjan, Cote D'Ivoire, Conakry, Guinea, Moscow, Russia, Kathmandu, Nepal, Dushanbe, Tajikistan, and Lima, Peru.

As an artist, he has been the recipient of the National Endowment for the Arts, the Graham Foundation for Advanced Studies in the Visual Arts, and the DC Commission on the Arts and Humanities.

Henry Allen, the former Washington Post's art critic wrote about MacKenzie's landscapes as "the moment in question isn't just the moment the shutter clicked, but a moment that slipped by decades or even a century before, when something went wrong and a farm began to edge toward ruin."

== Books ==
- Abandonings: Photographs of Otter Tail County, Minnesota - In reviewing this book, The Washington Post reviewer noted that the book was "one of the most beautiful and eloquent books of landscape photography I ever have seen."
- American Ruins, Ghosts on the Landscape - The Midwest Book Review wrote: “This is one of the most remarkably photographed books to come off the presses in a long time.”
- Markings - In discussing the photographs in this book, The Washington City Paper observed that "MacKenzie’s mesmerizing palette and knack for spotting improbable geometries set his work apart."
