= Sheila Giolitti =

American painter

- Education: Middlesex University; Mid Warwick College
- Style: Abstract art
- Father: Alberto Giolitti

Sheila Giolitti is an American painter currently residing in Norfolk, Virginia.

Giolitti's paintings are predominantly abstract works which are composed in layers that she simultaneously builds up and strips away. Giolitti is also the owner and director of Mayer Fine Art in Norfolk, VA. She is represented by Jankossen Contemporary in Basel, Switzerland and Adah Rose Gallery in the Washington, D.C., area. She has been described as "Norfolk, Virginia’s best-known fine artist."

== Life and work ==
Giolitti was born in Florida, raised in Italy and she studied art at Middlesex University, London, England (BFA), 1981–83 and at Mid Warwick College, Leamington Spa, England, (1978–79) where she received a Diploma in Ceramics. She is the daughter of Italian comic book artist Alberto Giolitti and his American-born wife Joan Giolitti. She is married to Sean Russell, and they have one son, Sebastian.

In the summer of 2008 Giolitti mounted an exhibition of student artwork at her gallery in Norfolk, which included a nude drawing by Philadelphia art student Erika Risko titled "Martyrdom." The drawing was a realistic rendering of a nude figure on four sheets of paper. At the time, Risko was a senior at the Moore College of Art & Design in Philadelphia. The exposure of female breasts in the drawing caused complaints leading to the local building management's demand for the breasts to be covered up.

Starting in 2008, the gallery was the first Virginia-based art gallery to participate in major art fairs (Affordable Art Fair in New York City), and subsequently in major art fairs in Miami during the Art Basel week of art fairs, which has become the art world's top draw.

In 2023 Giolitti was awarded a Fellowship from the Virginia Museum of Fine Arts.

Giolitti has stated about her work:

My involvement with the physical making of the surface is an integral part of the work, meaning that the surface on which I work is created as I work. Each layer of mark making is sealed with a layer of clear resin, which allows for a cataloguing of time and the change that it brings within each piece. These different elements find themselves bound within determined space. These boundaries serve both to unite and separate. They are definite or subtle, encroaching and ignored, erased only to reappear, self-organizing itself into larger more stable wholes.

== Press ==
- American art critic Mark St. John Erickson described Giolitti's paintings as "sensuously textured work, which she constructs from a highly personal yet still approachable vocabulary of symbols drawn from nature and other sources."
- Gilitti's work has been widely exhibited in multiple national and international exhibitions in galleries, art fairs in the US, France and Switzerland, and several museums including the Portsmouth Museum, Portsmouth, VA, Hermitage Museum & Gardens in Norfolk, VA, Suffolk Museum, Suffolk, VA, Contemporary Art Center of Virginia, VA Beach, VA, Rawls Museum, Courtland, VA, Mobile Museum of Art, Mobile, AL.
- Giolitti was awarded the Anne Meyers Award from the Hermitage Museum Foundation in 2000.
- Her work won Best in Show at the Gosport Arts Festival in 2001 as well as the Award of Excellence in 2005.
- In 2003 Giolitti won the Best in Show award at the Virginia Museum of Contemporary Art's Annual Boardwalk Art Show, Virginia Beach. This show is considered one of the Top 100 shows in the US.
- Awarded the Rawls Museum's Doris F. Conover Award in 2004 and the 2006 Best in Show Award at the Fusion Exhibition also at the Rawls Museum.
- In a review of a 2019 solo show in her hometown of Norfolk, Virginia, Veer Magazine described her as an "internationally sought-after artist."
- The Washington Post noted in a 2019 review of her solo show at Adah Rose Gallery that her work "evokes impenetrable night and immeasurable depths. Giolitti most often celebrates nature’s glory with intricate detail, but she can also find grandeur in sights that can’t be represented exactly."

== Collections ==
- The Sofia & Roman Trotsenko Collection, Moscow Russia
- Contemporary Art Center of Virginia – Virginia Beach, VA
- Port of Virginia, Norfolk, VA.
