= J. J. McCracken =

American artist (born 1972)

J. J. McCracken (born 1972 in Mifflin, Pennsylvania) is an American artist who lives and works in Washington, D.C. McCracken creates "sculptures, performances, and immersive installations focused on free speech, social justice and resource equity."

== Education ==
McCracken received a B.A. in Anthropology from The College of William and Mary in 1995, and an M.F.A. in Studio Art from The George Washington University in 2005. Subsequently, she attended the Skowhegan School of Painting and Sculpture.

== Artwork ==
McCracken has been called "among the smartest artists in Washington" by the Washington Post. Her work, installations and performances has been exhibited and performed in museums, galleries and universities. In 2018, she was one of 10 artists selected for the "Identify" series of performance/lectures at the National Portrait Gallery's "Identify" series.

== Exhibitions ==
- 2005 - Solo MFA thesis exhibition -re-performed as part of the Academy 2005, exhibition at Conner Contemporary Art, Washington, DC
- 2005 - Dissolve, The Dimock Gallery—The George Washington University; Washington, DC
- 2007 - Artifacts for a New Millennium, Meat Market Gallery; Washington, DC
- 2007 - A sketch for larger work, Performed at the entrance to KeyArena in Center City STASIS, Meat Market Gallery; Washington, DC
- 2007 - The Wait (Counting), KeyArena, Seattle, Washington
- 2008 - Living Sculpture, Project 4 Gallery, Washington, DC
- 2010 - San Angelo Museum of Fine Arts, San Angelo, Texas
- 2010 - The Clay Studio, Philadelphia, Pennsylvania
- 2010 - Earth To Table, The Kathryn E. Narrow Educational Resource Center, The Clay Studio, Philadelphia, Pennsylvania
- 2011 - Thirst, and the Martyr, (e)merge Art Fair, Capitol Skyline Hotel, Washington, DC
- 2011 - (e)merge art fair, Washington, DC
- 2011 - Climate, Control, Civilian Art Projects, Washington, DC
- 2012 - Renting the Rain, Watershed Center for the Ceramic Arts, Newcastle, Maine
- 2012 - The archaeologist (the steward), and wonder and study, Smithsonian Institution, Freer & Sackler Galleries, Washington, DC
- 2012 - The Huntress, (e)merge Art Fair, Capitol Skyline Hotel, Washington, DC
- 2013 - Siamo Quel Che Mangiamo? Sostenibilita` e arte (Are We What We Eat?), Accademia di Brera, Milan, Italy
- 2013 - Green Acres, The American University Museum at Katzen Art Center, Washington, DC
- 2013 - The Unexpected, Max L. Jackson Gallery at Queens University, Charlotte, North Carolina
- 2013 - Queer Objectivity, Stamp Gallery, University of Maryland, College Park, Maryland
- 2013 - A Recursive Lens, Hillyer/International Arts & Artists, Washington, DC
- 2014 - Husk, Arlington Arts Center, Arlington, VA
- 2014 - Inciteful Clay, Foosaner Art Museum at the Florida Institute of Technology, Melbourne, Florida
- 2014 - 40 Years of Community Art, Arlington Arts Center, Arlington, VA
- 2016 - The Mouth of the Scold (2016), was commissioned by the National Portrait Gallery for the "IDENTIFY: Performance Art as Portraiture" series. Following the performance, McCracken's sculpture, The Dunlevy Medallion, was exhibited in the Gallery's Great Hall.
- 2017 - Waiting for Godot, Gonzaga University - set features an art installation created by J.J. McCracken and Mat Rude, an assistant professor in Gonzaga’s art department.
