= David FeBland =

- Known for: painting
- Website: davidfebland.com

David FeBland is an artist who paints urban landscapes. He has studios in Arizona and in New York City, in the United States. His work has elements of Social Realism, and invites comparison to that of the Ashcan School, or to the photographs of Robert Frank or Garry Winogrand.

== Reception ==
A New York Times review in 1996 described his fish-eye view of the interior of a New York City taxi as "a model of bravura painting". A Washington Post review in 2001 noted that "David FeBland continues to paint manic Manhattan streetscapes that remind us why we love New York and hate it, too."
