= BlackRock Center for the Arts =

Arts center in Germantown, Maryland, US

BlackRock Center
- Interactive map of BlackRock Center
- Address: 12901 Town Commons Dr. Germantown, Maryland; United States
- Coordinates: 39.18214°N 77.267725°W
- Capacity: 250 seats

Construction
- Opened: September 2002: 23 years ago
- Architect: Bowie Gridley Architects

Website
- http://www.blackrockcenter.org/

The BlackRock Center for the Arts, officially the Germantown Cultural Arts Center (d.b.a. BlackRock Center for the Arts), is a cultural, visual and performing arts center in Germantown, Maryland. The center is named after the nearby historic Blackrock Mill.

== Overview ==
BlackRock Center for the Arts was founded in 2002 after the developer of Germantown town center donated land for the facility. It has an annual budget of $1.6 million. Since 2022 Katie Hecklinger has been Chief Executive Officer. The 30,000 sq ft (2,800 m^{2}) facility includes an art gallery, a 210-seat proscenium theater, a dance studio, a black box studio theater, a second-floor display gallery, music rooms, and visual art classrooms. It has 11 full-time and 23 part-time staff members. The center provides a range of music, dance, and arts classes, and camps, and presents a season of music, dance, and family-oriented performances.

In April 2013 it was announced that blues singer and guitarist John Hammond would provide a guitar workshop at the center.
