= Chawky Frenn =

American painter

- Born: Zahlé, Lebanon
- Occupations: Artist, author, and art professor at george mason university
- Known for: Figurative painting, political artwork, art activism
- Website: www.chawkyfrenn.com

Chawky Frenn is a Lebanese-born American artist, author, and art professor. He currently teaches art at George Mason University in northern Virginia. His highly realistic paintings have strong narrative social and political elements. Frenn is a Fulbright scholar, and currently resides in the Greater Washington, D.C. area.

In 2026, Chawky Frenn was conferred the Jan Mitra Award (Jan Mitra Samman) in Varanasi, India, by Jan Mitra Nyas and the People's Vigilance Committee on Human Rights (PVCHR) in recognition of his lifelong contribution to art, human dignity, peace, democracy, and human rights.

== Early life and education ==
Chawky Frenn was born in Zahlé, Lebanon. Frenn immigrated to the United States in 1981 and lived for several years in Boston, where he studied art and received a BFA from the Massachusetts College of Art and Design in Boston, Massachusetts, in 1985 and completed his MFA at Tyler School of Art of Temple University in Philadelphia, Pennsylvania, and at Temple Abroad in Rome, Italy, in 1988.

== Academic career ==
Frenn has taught art at Bridgewater State College in Bridgewater, Massachusetts; Montserrat College of Art in Beverly, Massachusetts; and Edinboro University of Pennsylvania in Edinboro, Pennsylvania. He is currently a full professor at George Mason University in Fairfax, Virginia, where he received a Teaching Excellence Award in 2009.

== Exhibitions ==
Frenn has exhibited widely in the United States, Europe, the Middle East, and Asia, and his work has been widely reviewed by major newspapers and significant art critics. His work has been exhibited at The Phillips Collection, Washington, D.C.; the Hoyt Institute of Fine Arts in New Castle, Pennsylvania; Housatonic Museum of Art in Bridgeport, Connecticut; Erie Art Museum in Erie, Pennsylvania; Arnot Art Museum in Elmira, New York; the Sursock Museum in Beirut, Lebanon; the Bharat Kala Bhavan – Art and Archaeology Museum, Banaras Hindu University, Varanasi, India; Delaware Contemporary, Wilmington, Delaware, the Taubman Museum of Art, Roanoke, Virginia, and others.

Frenn's paintings are also in the permanent collection of The Housatonic Museum of Art in Bridgeport, Connecticut and the Springfield Museum of Art in Springfield, Ohio.

=== Solo exhibitions ===
- 1985 – Raison d'Etre. Tower Gallery, Massachusetts College of Art and Design. Boston, MA
- 1987 – The Quest. Tyler Gallery, Tyler School of Art. Philadelphia, PA
- 1988 – Your Tragedy is Mine. Temple Abroad Gallery. Rome, Italy
- 1988 – Your Tragedy is Mine. Basilica San Lorenzo Maggiore. Milan, Italy
- 1991 – Active Meditation. Laura Knott Gallery, Bradford College. Bradford, MA
- 1991 – Dolls' Heads. Goforth Rittenhouse Galleries. Philadelphia, PA
- 1992 – A Living Trail. McKillop Gallery, Salve Regina University. Newport, RI
- 1993 – Shared Solitude. The Lowe Gallery. Atlanta, GA
- 1993 – Reckless Peace. Alif Gallery. Washington, DC
- 1994 – Big. Works of Surprising Size and Impact. The Art Center in Hargate, St. Paul's School. Concord, NH
- 1995 – Art for Life's Sake. Carnegie Arts Center. Covington, KY
- 1996 – Tomb to Womb. Anderson Gallery, Bridgewater State College. Bridgewater, MA
- 1996 – Sacra Conversazione. Bromfield Gallery. Boston, MA
- 1997 – Sacra Conversazione. Olaf Clasen Gallery. Cologne, Germany
- 1997 – Silence. Galerie Septentrion. Marcq-en-Baroeul, France
- 1998 – Wandering. Voss Gallery. Düsseldorf, Germany
- 2003–2004 – For Show or For Sure? Upper Jewett Exhibition Corridor, Dartmouth College. Hanover, NH
- 2000 – Thanatos and Eros. Passions Gallery. Provincetown, MA
- 2000–2002 – Ecce Homo. Traveling exhibition: Housatonic Museum of Art
- Johnson Center and Fine Arts Galleries, George Mason University. Fairfax, Virginia. Jan 15 – Feb 9, 2001
- The Art Center in Hargate, St. Paul's School. Concord, New Hampshire. Jan 11 – Feb 9, 2002
- Sarrat Gallery, Vanderbilt University. Nashville, Tennessee. Nov 2 – 27, 2000
- The Hoyt Institute of Fine Arts. New Castle, Pennsylvania. Apr 24 – May 25, 2001
- 2002 – Thanatos and Eros. Horizon Gallery. Santa Fe, NM
- Housatonic Museum of Art. Bridgeport, Connecticut. Jun 8 – Jul 20, 2001
- Erie Art Museum. Erie, Pennsylvania. Sep 22 – Dec 28, 2001
- 2002 – The Holy Cost. Fraser Gallery. Bethesda, MD
- 2004 – US and THEM. Fraser Gallery. Bethesda, MD
- 2005 – What is Truth? Washington Theological Union. Washington, DC
- 2006 – Art for Life's Sake. The Art Center, American University of Beirut. Beirut, Lebanon
- 2006 – Human, Not Too Human. Fraser Gallery. Bethesda, MD
- 2007 – Missa Pro Pace. Arlington Arts Center. Arlington, VA
- 2009 – Can humankind save itself? Lamar Dodd Art Center, LaGrange College. LaGrange, GA
- 2012 – Introspection: The Universal In The Personal. Cynthia Nouhra Art Gallery. Beirut, Lebanon
- 2012 – Be the change you seek! BlackRock Center for the Arts. Germantown, MD
- 2013 – We the People. Hess Gallery, Pine Manor College. Chestnut Hill, MA
- 2014 – We the People. Nestor Gallery. Milton Academy, Milton, MA

=== Museum exhibitions and international art fairs ===
- 1986 National April Salon. Springville Museum of Art. Springville, UT
- 1987 Harrisburg Arts Festival. State Museum of Pennsylvania. Harrisburg, PA
- National April Salon. Springville Museum of Art. Springville, UT
- 1989 Springfield Art League 70th Annual Exhibition. Springfield Museum of Fine Arts and George Walker Vincent Smith Art Museum. Springfield, MA
- 1991 Tenth Annual September Competition. Alexandria Museum of Art. Alexandria, LA
- Juried Exhibition. Attleboro Museum. Attleboro, MA
- 1992 ANA 21. The Holter Museum of Art. Helena, MT
- 1993 28th Annual Exhibition. The Fine Arts Institute of the San Bernardino County Museum. Redlands, CA
- Winter International Competition. The Florida Museum of Hispanic and Latin American Art. Miami, FL
- 1994 Hoyt National Art Show. The Hoyt Institute of Fine Arts. New Castle, PA
- Staten Island Biennial. Staten Island Institute of Arts and Sciences. Staten Island, NY
- 1995 XIX Salon d’Automne. Sursock Museum. Beirut, Lebanon
- 30th Annual Exhibition. The Fine Arts Institute of the San Bernardino County Museum. Redlands, CA
- 1997 XXI Salon d’Automne. Sursock Museum. Beirut, Lebanon
- 1998 XXII Salon d’Automne. Sursock Museum. Beirut, Lebanon
- 16th Annual September Competition. Alexandria Museum of Art. Alexandria, LA
- New Voices/New Visions. New The Alternative Museum. New York, NY
- 16th Contemporary Art Fair. ArtBrussels. Represented by Voss Gallery. Brussels, Belgium
- 2001–02 Re-presenting Representation 5. Arnot Art Museum. Elmira, NY
- 2001 Housatonic Museum of Art, Bridgeport, CT
- 2002 The Affordable Art Fair. Gescheidle. New York, NY
- 2004 20th Contemporary Art Fair. MAC 2000. Espace Champerret. Paris, France
- 2005 73rd Annual Cumberland Valley Artists Exhibition. Washington County Museum of Fine Arts. Hagerstown, MD
- 2006 Slow Painting: A Determined Renaissance. Oglethorpe University Museum of Art. Atlanta, GA
- 2007 Aachen to Arlington / Arlington to Aachen: Imaging the Distance. Ludwig Forum für Internationale Kunst. Aachen, Germany. Curators: Harold Kunde, director of the Ludwig Forum für Internationale Kunst, Claire Huschle and Carol Lukitsch.
- ARTDC Washington First Annual International Modern & Contemporary Art Fair. April 27–30 Washington Convention Center. Washington, DC
- Exhibition 280. Huntington Museum of Art. Huntington, WV
- Convergence: New Art From Lebanon. The Katzen American University Museum. Washington, DC
- 2012 Galvanized Truth – A Tribute to George Nick. Duxbury Art Complex Museum. Duxbury, MA
- 2013 Beirut Art Fair. September 19–22. Cynthia Nouhra Art Gallery. Beirut International Exhibition & Leisure center (BIEL). Beirut, Lebanon
- Beirut Bloom Contemporary Art Fair. April 17–27. Cynthia Nouhra Art Gallery. Artheum. Beirut, Lebanon
- 2014 Beirut Art Fair. September 19–21. Cynthia Nouhra Art Gallery. Beirut International Exhibition & Leisure center (BIEL). Beirut, Lebanon
- 2019 Radius 250, March 22 – April 21, 2019. Art Space, Richmond, Virginia.
- 2021 Inside Outside, Upside Down, July 17 – September 12, 2021. The Phillips Collection, Washington, DC.
- 2022 Homeward Bound! December 17, 2021 – March 6, 2022. Taubman Museum of Art. Roanoke, Virginia.
- 2025 We the Discarded, ISHI Gallery, Varanasi, India.

== Collections ==
Frenn’s works are included in many public and private collections, including:

- Dalloul Art Foundation, Beirut, Lebanon
- Library of Congress, Washington, D.C.
- District of Columbia, Washington, D.C.
- Springfield Museum of Art, Springfield, Ohio
- Housatonic Museum of Art, Bridgeport, Connecticut

== Books ==
Frenn is the author of the following books

- 100 Boston Artists Atglen, PA: Schiffer Books. ISBN 978-0764344039
- 100 Boston Painters Atglen, PA: Schiffer Books. ISBN 978-0764339769
- Art for Life's Sake Fine Arts Consulting and Publishing. ISBN 978-9953004846
- Ecce Homo Nassar Design: Beirut, Lebanon. ASIN B0016RH0RW

== Reviews ==
A New York Times review in 2001 described him as "a painter who has nailed down the figurative mode, and this accomplishment gives him the license to convey anything he wants, including the grand theme: the elusive meaning of human existence.”

A Washington Post review in 2004 added that Frenn is "an artist's artist (as opposed to a critic's artist)." In that same year, in discussing an exhibition of Frenn's works at Dartmouth The Lebanon Daily Star newspaper noted that "you might think it would take a lot to upstage an artist like Damien Hirst, but earlier this year Chawky Frenn did so with ease."

American art critic Donald Kuspit wrote that "He constructs a spiritual space in which the contemporary public can feel emotionally at home, however troubling the emotions his imagery evokes in them."

Washington Life Magazine described Frenn in 2009 as an "influential metro area visual artist."
