= F. Lennox Campello =

American artist

- Born: 1956 (age 69–70); Santiago de Cuba, Cuba
- Education: University of Washington (BFA); Naval Postgraduate School (MS)
- Occupations: Artist; art critic; author; blogger
- Known for: Narrative art, embedded technology in art
- Military career
- Allegiance: United States
- Branch: United States Navy
- Service years: 1974–1997
- Rank: Commander

F. Lennox Campello is an American (born in Cuba, 1956) artist, art critic, author, art dealer, curator, and visual arts blogger. In 2016 The Washington City Paper called him "one of the most interesting people of Washington, DC."

== Early life and education ==
Florencio Lennox Campello was born in Santiago de Cuba, Cuba in 1956, and immigrated as a child to the United States in the 1960s along with his political refugee parents and was raised in Brooklyn, New York. He attended Aviation High School in Long Island, New York (Class of 1974). He studied art at the University of Washington (BFA, 1981), where he was commissioned as a U.S. Navy officer, and subsequently received an MS from the Naval Postgraduate School in Monterey, California in 1987.

== Artwork ==
Campello's art is predominantly narrative and storytelling in nature, and often incorporates technology such as video, sound, and miniature spy cameras into the finished pieces. He has exhibited widely in the United States, Europe and Latin America, including in the McManus Museum in Scotland, the Brusque Museum in Brazil, the San Bernardino County Museum in California, the Meadows Museum of Art in Shreveport, Louisiana, the Hunter Museum of American Art in Tennessee, the Sacramento Fine Arts Center in California, the Boulder Museum of Contemporary Art in Colorado, the Schneider Museum of Art in Ashland, Oregon, the A.S. Popov Central Museum of Communications in Russia, the American University Museum, the Boise Art Museum in Idaho, the Jordan Schnitzer Museum at the University of Oregon, the American Museum of the Cuban Diaspora in Miami, Florida, and The Phillips Collection in Washington, DC.

=== The Cuba series ===
This body of works was started in the 1970s while the artist was in art school, and uses the shape/map of the island of Cuba as the unifying element in paintings, prints and drawings. In the works, the island is often depicted as behind jail bars (such as on the cover of the poetry book Cuba in Verse: The Island Behind Bars by Ada Bezos, Editorial Betania (2012) ISBN 978-8480174008), or with oars, or surrounded by tears, etc.

=== The Superhero series ===
Campello's artwork often appropriates American comic book superhero themes, most often Batman, Superman, Spider-Man and others. He has also curated several group art shows where the artwork is focused on multiple artistic interpretations of the superhero iconography.

=== Pictish Nation series ===
This series focuses on interpreting the tattoo artwork of the original people of Scotland, known as the Picts. Campello was exposed to Pictish culture while living in Scotland in the 1990s, and began focusing a series of drawings and paintings which over the years have interpreted and reproduced the Pictish tattoos on a variety of male and female nude studies.

== Awards ==
Campello was awarded the 1979 First Prize (Drawing) by Renton Art Society Renton, Washington, 1981 First Prize (Drawing). from the Keene-Mason Gallery National Competition New York, NY, 1981 First Prize (Printmaking), Whipple Gallery National Competition, Marshall, MN, the 1995 Best of Show at the 20th Princess Anne Art Show in Virginia Beach, VA, Best of Show at the 1996 Festival in the Park in Roanoke, Virginia, and the Best in Show at the 2007 Stockley Gardens Art Festival in Norfolk, VA. He was most recently awarded a Maryland State Arts Council Individual Artist Award in 2019, and one of his works was acquired in 2018 for the permanent collection of Montgomery County, Maryland.

== Reviews ==
In a review of his 1996 exhibition of portraits of Internet porn stars, The Washington Post noted that his artwork "manages to find a delicate balance between the black charcoal and cream-colored paper resulting in a grainy, film-noir effect, making his subjects, traffickers in mass-consumption prurience, seem tough but vulnerable, like a flowering plant in a sexual wasteland."

A more recent review of his 2017 solo show in The Washington Post explained that "His technique is classical, but he sometimes incorporates a contemporary technology: embedded video. “Portrait of You” features a live feed of the picture's viewer, and “Cuban by Ancestry, but American by the Grace of God" (seen last year at the American University Museum) chronicles his family history on a video loop." In reviewing the same show, The Washington City Paper noted that the solo show focused "on a couple of his far-ranging "artistic obsessions," as he calls them, from Frida Kahlo to the Book of Genesis to the Picts of Scotland."

American art critic Dr. Claudia Rousseau observed that "Campello is a prolific artist who has had an interesting and compelling trajectory of work since the 1980s." Brickell Magazine described him as "a thought leader in the world of the arts on a global scale." In 2020 The Washington City Paper characterized him as a "prominent figure" in discussing artistic responses to the COVID-19 pandemic, and a year later described one of his works at The Phillips Collection as a "clever combination of low and high tech, pairing a simple charcoal drawing of a child looking at her reflection, which is shown as a revolving series of electronic images of diverse faces." In 2022, during the annual Art Basel Miami Beach week of art fairs in Miami, he was described as one of the "most intriguing creative minds in the city."

=== Solo shows ===
- 1979 The HUB Gallery. University of Washington. Seattle, Washington
- 1981 Arts Northwest Gallery. Seattle, Washington
- 1992 Warehouse Gallery. Banff, Scotland
- 1993 Chevrier's Presidio Gallery. Sonoma, California
- 1994 Chevrier's Presidio Gallery. Sonoma, California
- 1996 Fraser Gallery. Washington, D.C.
- 1997 49 West. Annapolis, Maryland
- 1997 Fraser Gallery. Washington, D.C.
- 1998 Fraser Gallery. Washington, D.C.
- 1999 Fraser Gallery. Washington, D.C.
- 2000 Eklektikos Gallery. Washington, D.C.
- 2001 Fraser Gallery. Washington, D.C.
- 2002 Fraser Gallery. Washington, D.C.
- 2003 Fraser Gallery. Washington, D.C.
- 2004 Fraser Gallery. Washington, D.C.
- 2005 Fraser Gallery. Washington, D.C.
- 2008 Red Door Gallery. Richmond, VA
- 2011 Featured Artist, Aqua Art Fair, Miami Beach, Florida
- 2017 Artists & Makers. Rockville, Maryland
- 2019 Stone Tower Gallery, Glen Echo, MD
- 2020 Featured Artist, Art on Paper Fair, New York, NY

== Blogger ==
His blog, Daily Campello Art News has been published since 2003 and has been called "indispensable", and also "a bona fide fixture" by the Washington City Paper, which also credits the blog with being the potential "inventor" of the ubiquitous acronym "DMV" to refer to the Greater Washington, DC area (it stands for District, Maryland, Virginia). The local CBS TV station included it in its "Best Local Bloggers" list. The blog is included in the various "Top 100 Art Blogs in the World" listings, and in 2022, the blog was listed as the 11th top ranked art news websites in the world.

== Books ==
Campello is the author of 100 Artists of Washington, DC, Schiffer Publishing, Ltd. (June 1, 2011) ISBN 978-0764337789. He is also the cover artist for Cuba in Verse: The Island Behind Bars by Ada Bezos, Editorial Betania (2012) ISBN 978-8480174008, and the cover artist and interior illustrator for Winging It!-In Europe by Linda and Jim Stringer, Suncity Pub (January 1, 1993) ISBN 978-1882410002

== Gallerist ==
In 1996 Campello, together with his then wife, the British photographer Catriona Fraser, co-founded the Fraser Gallery in the Georgetown neighborhood of Washington, DC. In 2002 they opened a second gallery in Bethesda, MD. The two galleries closed in 2011, as the couple had divorced earlier, and Campello had moved to Philadelphia in 2006, where he lived until 2009, before returning to the Washington, DC area in 2010.

== Curator ==
Campello has curated many visual art shows, most generally around the Greater Washington, DC region, including several seminal art shows focused on dissident Cuban artists, and has been referred to as "one of the most well known faces on the local art scene." In 2025 he curated the exhibition Women Artists of the DMV: A Survey Exhibition. The exhibition was in 16 venues in Maryland, and Virginia and Washington, D.C.
