= List of artists who have exhibited in Artomatic =

Artomatic is a multi-week, multimedia arts ad hoc event held in the Greater Washington, D.C. area.

- F. Lennox Campello 2000
- Patricia Goslee 2002
- Frank Warren's PostSecret project began at Artomatic 2004
- Mark Jenkins 2004
- Michael Janis 2004
- Dana Ellyn 2004
- Amber Robles-Gordon 2007
- Robin Bell 2008
- Ric Garcia in 2008, 2009 and 2012
- Joan Belmar 2009
- Nicolas F. Shi 2009
- Tim Tate 2000, 2002, 2004, 2008, 2009, 2012
- Erwin Timmers 2012
- Nate Lewis 2012
- Anne Cherubim 2015
- Sandra Perez-Ramos 2016
- Diane Tuckman 2016
