= Artomatic =

Artomatic's logo

Artomatic is a multi-week, multimedia arts event held in the Washington metropolitan area of the United States. It was founded by Washington, D.C. artist and arts activist George Koch. The non-juried, open event has provided a forum for artists of all types (visual, performance, and literary) and abilities (from novice to professional). There are also arts education and professional development workshops and discussions. Events were held from 1999 up to 2017 at intervals from one to three years, depending upon the availability of a site. Unable to have in-person events due to the COVID-19 pandemic, an online event was held in 2020. The organization has remained active in the local arts community.

== Structure ==
A steering committee comprising local artists, arts administrators, and community activists develops outreach procedures and participation guidelines to ensure the broadest possible artistic representation from the Washington metropolitan area. Each participant pays a fee and commits to volunteering for 15 hours. Most participants, however, give much more of their time; volunteers execute every task, from hauling trash and building exhibit structures to maintaining the website. As a result, the show draws artists and visitors of different races, cultural backgrounds, ages and experience levels.

Artomatic provides a mechanism for emerging and established artists to have the chance to work with and learn from one another. The diversity of artwork and performances attract a broad range of people, providing a forum to build institutional connections; linking public and private schools, universities, community development organizations, human service organizations, corporations, foundations, and cultural organizations.

Artomatic Inc is a 501(c)(3) nonprofit organization that organizes Artomatic events. Artomatic, Inc was incorporated on April 22, 2005.

Artomatic Inc is overseen by a volunteer board of directors, led by Co-Presidents Jamila Canty and Olivia Garcia. Artomatic hired Natalie Graves Tucker as its first executive director in October 2019.

== History ==
The first Art-O-Matic, as it was spelled then, ran from May 21 to June 19, 1999. It started as a fairly spontaneous event in the Manhattan Laundry buildings on Florida Avenue in Northwest Washington. The location, in an old laundromat, accounts for the name. The D.C. Commission on the Arts and Humanities acquired about $25,000 of artwork from this show for permanent display in the capital's public buildings through its Art in Public Places program.

The second Art-O-Matic was held from September 29 to October 28, 2000. This time, it was held in the Tenleytown neighborhood of Northwest Washington, in a then vacant building that had at various times been a Sears and a Hechinger. Artist Tim Tate's "artwork at Artomatic 2000 was seen by the curator of the Smithsonian's Renwick Museum, and that show both got his work into the Museum's permanent collection, and his sales at the show provided the seed money that started the Washington Glass School."

October 31 to November 30, 2002, saw the third Art-O-Matic, in a former EPA building in the Southwest Waterfront neighborhood of Washington, D.C., at 401 M Street SW, adjacent to Waterside Mall (the EPA building and the mall were both later demolished). At this Art-O-Matic, for the first time, the Figure Models Guild of the Washington, D.C., area sponsored open life drawing events. There would be live, often nude, models posing, and artists drawing.

The fourth Artomatic, as it was now spelled and has been spelled since, was held from November 12 through December 5, 2004, at the old Capital Children's Museum in the H Street Corridor of Washington, D.C. Blake Gopnik, art critic for The Washington Post, wrote that the majority of the show's work was mediocre or worse, and decried the waste of money and effort that could have gone to worthwhile, professional arts activities in Washington, D.C.

The fifth Artomatic was held from April 13 to May 20, 2007. This was the first time Artomatic was held outside Washington, D.C.. It occupied two floors of a vacated office building in Crystal City in Arlington County, Virginia. The space had previously been occupied by the Patent and Trademark Office.

Artomatic returned to Washington, D.C., with the sixth iteration, held from May 9 through June 15, 2008. This time, they occupied 10 floors of Capitol Plaza I, a new – not yet completed – office building in the NoMa neighborhood.

In February 2009, Artomatic collaborated with the Pink Line Project for "Luck of the Draw: An Art and Music Experience." This event attracted over 1,500 people and was held at the Capitol Riverfront Neighborhood. Also in this seventh version of the event, several artists received interesting letters from someone who called himself "The Benefactor", causing both admiration and alarm in several of the artists.

The seventh Artomatic was also the tenth anniversary event. It ran from May 29 to July 5, 2009 in the Navy Yard neighborhood of Washington, D.C. It occupied a brand new building, 55 M Street SE, in a development near the new Washington Nationals ballpark located right over an entrance of the Navy Yard Metro Station. Over 76,000 visitors attended.

The eighth Artomatic was held from May 18 to June 23, 2012, in Crystal City, Virginia. It was held in a 320,000-square-foot (30,000 m^{2}) vacant office building.

The ninth Artomatic was held in New Carrollton, Maryland, from October 30 to December 12, 2015.

The tenth Artomatic was held in Potomac, Maryland, in November 2016. Diane Tuckman, a pioneering silk artist and author on the same genre exhibited and taught classes at this Artomatic.

The eleventh Artomatic returned to Crystal City, Virginia running from March 24 to May 6, 2017. It was staged using seven floors of an empty office building.

The artfair organizers wanted to mark the 20th anniversary year in a meaningful way. However, 2019 came and went without finding a location to host the exhibition, so anniversary plans were moved to 2020, only to be upended by the outbreak of COVID-19. It was announced that for 2020, the production of Artomatic would be a totally online exhibition.

The organization remained in existence to promote local art, but had not been able to hold any in-person events until 2024, when a twelfth Artomatic was announced, to take place in Washington, DC from March 9 to April 28, 2024. The 2024 Artomatic is in the largest building ever at over 400,000 square feet. The opening remarks ceremony by Washington, DC mayor Muriel Bowser made national news when her remarks were interrupted by Gaza protesters who rushed the stage.

=== Licensed events and partnerships ===
The Artomatic concept has been licensed out to other places, including Frederick, Maryland, in October and November 2011, and Toledo, Ohio, in April 2015.

In 2005 the Fraser Gallery of Bethesda, MD exhibited "Artomatic Top 10." The show was curated to exhibit the work of the top ten artists selected by the gallery director from the 2004 Artomatic, and included work by Mark Jenkins, Michael Janis, Tim Tate and others. The show was selected as a "Hot Pick" of the week by The Washington Post. Also in 2005, the Anne C. Fisher Gallery in Georgetown selected an exhibition selected from Artomatic artists titled "10 Most Wanted." The exhibition was curated by Fisher and by F. Lennox Campello, and included work by Frank Warren, the creator of the PostSecret project.

In 2007, three art galleries in Bethesda, Maryland, put on a coordinated selected show of artists who had taken part in Artomatic. The galleries mounted the art for their monthly Bethesda Art Walk of January 12, 2007.

In 2009, this was repeated by the Fraser Gallery in Bethesda, with a second curated exhibition of Artomatic artists.

Smaller events and partnerships have also happened in following years, including a small display in the oldest wing of National Airport in 2011 and select Artomatic artists were featured with poetry by BRASH at Studio Gallery on R Street NW in Washington, D.C., in 2010.

In 2013, thirty-five artists who participated at Artomatic 2012 were curated by juror F. Lennox Campello to show work at the PEPCO Edison gallery in Downtown Washington, D.C.

Artomatic has also partnered with art groups from other cities and countries, specifically glass studios from England for the 2009 iteration, in order to bring work from elsewhere into the DC art scene. The 2009 Artomatic included of one of Washington, DC's Sister Cities: Sunderland, England. Thirty seven artists and businesses from Sunderland participated in Artomatic including glass artists and musical acts.

== Notable artists ==
- Michele Banks exhibited in Artomatic 2024
- Robin Bell exhibited in Artomatic 2008
- Joan Belmar exhibited at Artomatic 2009
- BRASH, a mysterious poet who has left poems for the exhibiting artists, many of whom choose to display the poems with their artwork
- Clark V. Fox exhibited in Art-O-Matic 2000 under the name Clark Hogan
- F. Lennox Campello exhibited in Art-O-Matic 2000
- Shanthi Chandrasekar exhibited in Artomatic 2012
- Anne Cherubim exhibited in Artomatic 2015
- Mary Early exhibited in Art-O-Matic 2000
- Dana Ellyn exhibited at Artomatic 2004
- Ric Garcia exhibited in 2008, 2009 and 2012
- Patricia Goslee exhibited in Art-O-Matic 2000 and 2002
- Michael Janis exhibited at Artomatic 2004 and Artmatic 2024
- Barbara Januszkiewicz exhibited in Art-O-Matic 2000
- Mark Jenkins exhibited at Artomatic 2004
- Nate Lewis exhibited in Artomatic 2012
- Percy Martin exhibited in Art-O-Matic 2000
- Sandra Perez-Ramos exhibited at Artomatic 2016
- Raquel Partnoy exhibited in Art-O-Matic 2000
- Amber Robles-Gordon exhibited in Artomatic 2007
- Erik Sandberg exhibited in Art-O-Matic 2000
- Nicolas F. Shi exhibited in Art-O-Matic 2000 and Artomatic 2009
- Dan Steinhilber exhibited in Art-O-Matic 2000
- Lou Stovall exhibited in Art-O-Matic 2000
- Tim Tate, whose artwork "The Rapture" disappeared under dramatic circumstances during Artomatic 2007, and later a ransom demand (for Monopoly money) was sent to The Washington Post. The demands were met and parts of the artwork were returned by the thief, named "The Collector," along with his manifesto about society failing to value its art.
- Erwin Timmers exhibited in Art-O-Matic 2000, Artomatic 2012, and Artomatic 2024
- Diane Tuckman exhibited in Artomatic 2016
- Frank Warren's PostSecret project began at Artomatic 2004
- Colin Winterbottom exhibited in Artomatic 2024
