= The Looking Glass: Artist Immigrants of Washington =

Art exhibition of immigrants from Latin America

The Looking Glass: Artist Immigrants of Washington was a curated invitational art exhibition held from June 18 through August 14, 2016 at The American University Museum at the Katzen Arts Center in Washington, DC.

== Curator ==
This exhibition was an invitational curated exhibition which featured the work of ten Washington, DC area artists who were immigrants to the United States from Latin America. The work was selected by Jack Rasmussen, director and curator of the American University Museum at the Katzen Arts Center.

== Focus ==
The exhibition was curated to focus on the immigration, experiences, and views of ten Washington, DC area artists - all of whom were immigrants to the United States with "roots in Latin America." The curator noted that the artists came "from different generations and from different circumstances... but they brought with them artistic traditions and innovations that took root and bore fruit here in the United States—and in the Washington area."

== Notable artists ==
The artists in the exhibition were Joan Belmar and Juan Downey, originally from Chile; F. Lennox Campello, Ric Garcia and Jose Ygnacio Bermudez, from Cuba; Muriel Hasbun, from El Salvador; Frida Larios, from El Salvador/Honduras; Irene Clouthier, from Mexico; and Naul Ojeda, from Uruguay.

== Critical reception ==
The exhibition was widely reviewed, both at the regional and national level. The Washington Post art critic described some of the art as being "simultaneously mythic and as modern as a can of Goya black bean soup," while The Washington City Paper art critic observed about the artists, that "most, on some level, are confronting the various cultural aspects of migration, colonization, and imperialism."
