= Katzen Arts Center =

Coordinates: 38.9393°N 77.087°W

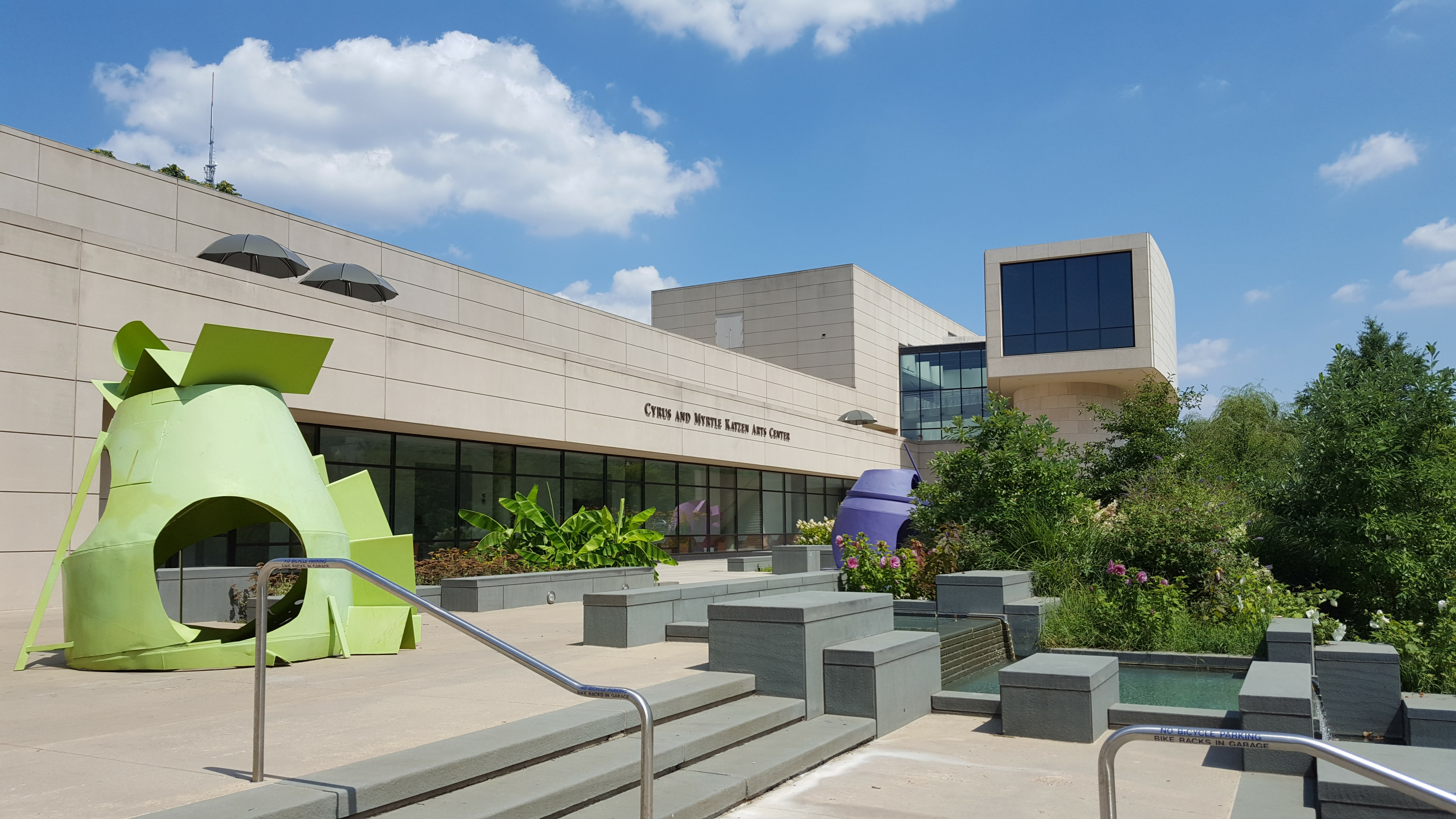
- Type: Private
- Established: 2005
- Address: 4400 Massachusetts Ave. NW, Washington, District of Columbia, United States
- Website: https://www.american.edu/cas/katzen/

The Cyrus and Myrtle Katzen Arts Center is home to all of the visual and performing arts programs at American University and the American University Museum. It is located at Ward Circle, the intersection of Nebraska Avenue and Massachusetts Avenues in Washington, D.C. This 130,000-square-foot (12,000 m^{2}) space, designed to foster interdisciplinary collaboration in the arts, provides instructional, exhibition, and performance space for all the arts disciplines. Its 30,000-square-foot (3,000 m^{2}) art museum exhibits contemporary art from the nation's capital region and the world. The museum gallery is the Washington region's largest university facility for art exhibition.

The Center houses many academic departments for the university, including Art History, Graphic Design, Studio Art, Arts Management, Dance, Music, and Theatre. The center also features a 30,000-square-foot (3,000 m^{2}) museum; a 6,000-square-foot (600 m^{2}) sculpture garden; a 211,000-square-foot (19,600 m^{2}) parking garage; 33,000 square feet (3,100 m^{2}) of performing arts space; 37,000 square feet (3,400 m^{2}) of studio space including theatre studios, a music ensemble room, art studios, and dance studios; an admissions welcome center; and the Abramson Family Recital Hall.

The construction of the Center was made possible by Dr. Cyrus and Mrs. Myrtle Katzen, who house much of their modern art collection within the building.

== American University Museum ==
The American University Museum is a three-story, 30,000-square-foot (3,000 m^{2}) museum and sculpture garden located within the university's Katzen Arts Center. As the region's largest university facility for exhibiting art, the museum's permanent collection highlights the holdings of the Katzen and Watkins collection. Rotating exhibitions emphasize regional, national, and international contemporary art.

Much of Dr. Cyrus and Mrs. Myrtle Katzen's modern art collection is showcased in the museum, which includes over 300 pieces by artists such as Pablo Picasso, Marc Chagall, Willem de Kooning, and Roy Lichtenstein. The museum also includes art by Jean Dubuffet, Red Grooms, Amedeo Modigliani, Larry Rivers, Frank Stella and Andy Warhol.

The museum is also home for the Alper Initiative for Washington Art, which "is dedicated to preserving, presenting, and creating the art history of Washington through our book collection, database, events, and exhibitions." As part of the initiative, the museum hosts up to five new exhibitions of Greater Washington area artists each year.

== Notable exhibitions ==
Since its opening, the museum has generally staged multiple exhibitions each year, often hosting one separate exhibition in each floor. Among the most important recent exhibitions, was the first ever American exhibition of contemporary North Korean art, which was held concurrently with an exhibition of art by notable immigrant Greater Washington area artists, including Ric Garcia, Joan Belmar, F. Lennox Campello, Muriel Hasbun, Juan Downey, and others. In 2022 the museum hosted an exhibition titled "Home-Land Exploring the American Myth", in which the museum took "advantage of the museum’s proximity to the Department of Homeland Security’s Nebraska Avenue Complex, this exhibition explores the impact that American culture has on its citizens both naturalized and native."

Other important artists showcased by the museum over the years include Sam Gilliam, William Christenberry, Lou Stovall, Tim Tate, Richard Diebenkorn, Sandra Ramos, Renee Stout, Thomas Downing, Michael Clark, Jim Sanborn, Joe Shannon, Michael B. Platt, and others.

== Architecture ==
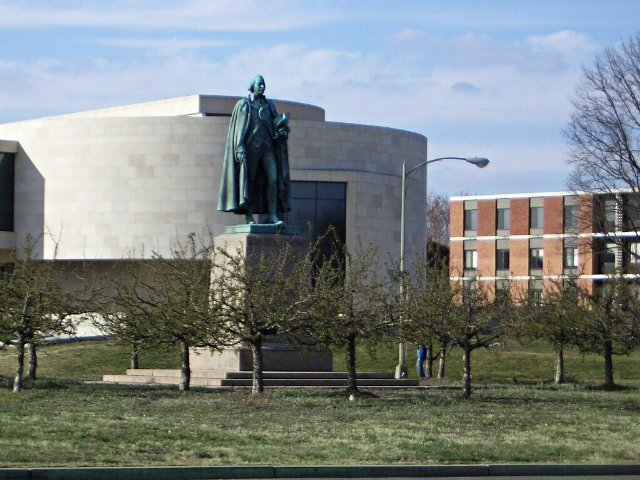
Statue of Artemas Ward at Ward Circle with Katzen Art Center behind

Upon completion, the Katzen Arts Center was immediately received as an architectural gem at American University, not only for its design but also for its purpose to encourage student innovation in media, concept, and approach by uniting facilities for creating, displaying, and performing art under one roof. Designed by EYP Architecture & Engineering, the Center is situated on a very long, narrow site abutting Ward Circle. Other architectural highlights include the piazza with a skylighted rotunda at the center of the facility.
