= Kretz =

Kretz may refer to:

== People ==
- Amélie Kretz (born 1993), Canadian triathlete
- Ed Kretz
- Ed Kretz Jr.
- Eric Kretz (born 1966), American musician
- Jean-Marie Kretz (born 1958), French weightlifter
- Joel Kretz (born 1957), American politician
- Johannes Kretz (born 1968), Austrian composer
- Jürgen Kretz (born 1982), German politician
- Kate Kretz (born 1963), American artist
- Ludwig Kretz, Austrian cyclist
- Richard Kretz (1865–1920), Austrian pathologist

== Places ==
- Kretz, Rhineland-Palatinate, Germany
