= Robin Bell =

Robin Bell may refer to:

- Robin Bell (canoeist) (born 1977), South African-born, Australian slalom canoeist
- Robin Bell (scientist), American geophysicist
- Robin Bell (artist) (born 1979), American artist

== See also ==
- Robin Bell Dodson (born 1956), American billiards player
