= Inside Outside, Upside Down =

Museum art show in Washington, DC

Inside Outside, Upside Down was an invitational art exhibition held from July 17 to September 12, 2021, at The Phillips Collection in Washington, D.C., as part of the museum's centennial celebration exhibitions.

== Jurors ==
This exhibition was an invitational exhibition which showcased the work of 64 Washington, DC area artists. The work was selected by jurors Phil Hutinet, Founding Publisher of East City Art, artist Renée Stout, Abigail McEwen, Associate Professor of Latin American Art, University of Maryland, and Elsa Smithgall, Senior Curator, The Phillips Collection.

== Focus ==
The exhibition focused on capital area artists' reaction to the COVID-19 pandemic, and reflected the "vivid the turmoil, strength, and resiliency of the human spirit in the face of the past year's global COVID-19 pandemic and social upheaval." The Washington Post also noted that the "exhibition is also a rare major museum showcase for a large group of local artists."

== Notable artists ==
More than 800 artists submitted work to the jurors, who then invited 64 area artists to exhibit. Some of the area's more notable artists, such as Tim Tate, Chawky Frenn, Judith Peck, Kate Kretz, F. Lennox Campello, Michael Janis, Nicolas F. Shi, and others were included in the exhibition.

== Critical reception ==
The exhibition was widely reviewed, and The Washington Post art critic wrote that the "show is one of the largest and most impressive to ponder the crises, paradoxes and sheer boredom of 2020, when some people sheltered at home while others spilled into the streets," while The Washington City Paper critic commented that the show "forces us to remember a time that left us 'confused, battered, and disoriented' through the eyes of 64 D.C.-area artists." The show and the selection process also spawned a Salon of the Refused exhibition, exhibiting many of the rejected artists.
