= Judith Peck =

American artist

- Born: Brooklyn, NY
- Education: George Washington University
- Occupation: Artist
- Known for: Allegorical Painting

Judith Peck is an American artist (born 1957 in Brooklyn, New York) currently residing in the Greater Washington, D.C. area who is predominantly known for her allegorical figurative oil paintings.

== Early life and education ==
Peck was born in 1957 in Brooklyn, New York. She studied art at George Washington University in Washington, D.C., and received a BFA in 1979.

== Artwork ==
Judith Peck was described by Professional Artist magazine as an "allegorical figurative artist who has made her life’s work to paint about history and healing, using a variety of methods and experimental techniques to achieve a diverse range of visual and tactile results that validate a strong narrative."

Her paintings have been exhibited nationwide and internationally including at the Alexandria Museum of Art in Alexandria, Louisiana, the Masur Museum of Art in Monroe, Louisiana, the Washington County Museum of Fine Arts in Hagerstown, Maryland, the Koehnline Museum of Art, Des Plaines, Illinois, Fresno Art Museum, in Fresno, California, the Portsmouth Museum, in Portsmouth, Virginia, New Britain Museum of American Art, CT, Virginia Museum of Contemporary Art, and others. Her artwork has also been selected for multiple awards, including the 2019 Best in Show at the Washington County Museum of Art exhibition, the 2018 Phil Desind Award during the Midyear Exhibition at the Butler Institute of American Art and the 2016 Best in Show award at the Pinnacle Exhibition at Florida A&M University Foster-Tanner Fine Arts Gallery. She has also been awarded a Strauss Fellowship Grant from Fairfax County, Virginia.

Her work has been described as "ethereal portrait paintings" by The Washington Post, and in writing about her work Penn State News noted that "She portrays the broken yet beautiful human experience in her oil paintings." In highlighting her work in a 1997 five person show at the Platt Gallery in Los Angeles, the Los Angeles Times art critic noted that Peck's works in the show were "the most emotionally charged art here, portraying 'persecuted Jews from the diaspora.' In her paintings, Hebrew characters appear, like an omniscient force, atop portraits of melancholic faces. In 'Last Covenant,' the letters drip blood over the sunken-eyed face of a woman."

In 2019, for her most recent show at The Gallery at the Pennsylvania College of Technology, she stated that "I’m not painting the other, I’m painting everyone and we all live in the world together and we are responsible for everyone, each other..." In 2021 she was one of the artists invited to The Phillips Collection's juried invitational, Inside Outside, Upside Down exhibition, a show that was described by The Washington City Paper art critic as forcing "us to remember a time that left us 'confused, battered, and disoriented' through the eyes of 64 D.C.-area artists."

In 2025, her work was showcased at the American University Art Museum at the Katzen Arts Center as part of the "Women Artists of the DMV" exhibition curated by F. Lennox Campello.

== Solo exhibitions ==
- 1999 Dadian Gallery, Wesley Theological Seminary, Washington, DC
- 1999 Swords into Plowshares Gallery, Detroit, MI
- 2002 Intercultural Museum, Baltimore, MD
- 2010 International Arts and Artists’ Hillyer Art Space, Washington, DC
- 2011 Meyer Metro Gallery, Bellaire, TX
- 2012 Hoyt Institute for the Arts, New Castle, PA
- 2013 Gallery 65, McLean, VA
- 2015 Chelsea Underground Art Gallery, Chelsea, MI
- 2017 Hill Center Gallery, Washington, DC
- 2016 Artists and Makers 2, Rockville, MD
- 2018 The Gallery at Penn College, Pennsylvania College of Technology, PA

== Awards ==
Peck is a four-time award winner of the District of Columbia Commission on the Arts and Humanities purchase awards for the permanent collection of the city of Washington, DC, and also a purchase award from the Alexandria Commission for the Arts for the permanent collection of the city of Alexandria, Virginia.

- 2011 Strauss Fellowship Grant from Fairfax County, VA
- Juror's Choice Award - About Face. Annmarie Sculpture Garden & Art Center, Solomons, MD
- 2012 Best in Show - In The Flesh III, Target Gallery, Alexandria, VA
- 2013 Juror's Award - Masur Museum of Art, Monroe, LA
- 2014 Awarded Brush Creek Residency, Saratoga, WY
- 2016 Best in Show winner - Pinnacle - Florida A&M University Foster-Tanner Fine Arts Gallery, Tallahassee, FL
- Second Place - Emulsion 2016 - East City Art - Cataloged - Washington, DC
- At the Walker exhibition - Cataloged - The Walker Art Collection, Garnett, KS
- Awarded - International Artist-in-Residence Hallein Kunstinsel Program, Salzburg, Austria
- Second Place - Figurative National Juried Competition, Lore Degenstein Gallery, Susquehanna University, Selinsgrove, PA
- 2017 Best in Show Award plus Students’ Choice Award - Art Speaks on the Bay, Mathews, VA
- Second Place Award - Regional Exhibition, Hill Center Gallery, Washington, DC
- First Place - For & About Women, Frederick Gallery, Fredericksburg Center for the Creative Arts, Fredericksburg, VA
- Second Place Award - 30 September International Competition, Alexandria Museum of Art, Alexandria, LA
- 2018 Phil Desind Award - National Midyear Exhibition - Butler Institute of American Art
- 2019 Best in Show - Washington County Museum of Art, Hagerstown, MD

== Publications ==
- The Ashen Rainbow : Essays on the Arts and the Holocaust, Ori Z. Soltes, Bartleby Press: Silver Spring, MD ISBN 978-0935437379
- Q and A, PoetsArtists Magazine Feb 2011 Volume 4 Issue 1
- Collaboration Issue, PoetsArtists Magazine issue 3 July 2011
- Gaze of the Beholder, American Art Collector Magazine, December 2011, Issue 74
- Featured in the Birmingham Arts Journal, Volume 9, Issue 1, 2012
- Artists and Their Models PoetsArtists Issue 38 Sept 2012
- Depth Perception, The Artist’s Magazine, October 2012
- Bourgeon: Fifty Artists Write About Their Work, Robert Bettmann (Editor) Day Eight (2013) ISBN 978-0615708959
- Heroes and Villains Issue, PoetsArtists Magazine, May 2013
- Cover and feature article Elan Magazine, December 2013
- Kress Project, Georgia Museum of Art, 2013, Lynn Boland (author) ISBN 978-0915977796
- Feature Article, Catapult Magazine, 2013 Issue 24.
- Cracked and Broken, American Art Collector Magazine, Jan. 2014 Issue 99
- Interview PoetsArtists Magazine Issue 52 Feb. 2014
- Collaborative project with poet Edward Nudelman, PoetsArtists Magazine issue 50, 2014
- The Portrait Issue PA Magazine feature, Issue 72 January 2016
- Tradition and Transformation: Three Millennia of Jewish Art and Architecture, Ori Z. Soltes, Canal Street Studios, 2016 ISBN 978-1530201273
- 50 Memorable Painters, PoetsArtists Magazine, December 2016
- Series Catalogue, Judith Peck, PoetsArtists Magazine, 2017
- The Reachable Shore, American Art Collector Magazine, Issue 135 Jan 2017
- Sight Unseen, PoetsArtists Magazine, Feb. 2017 Issue 81
- Idiosyncratic Monochromes PoetsArtists Magazine Issue 85, June 2017
- Hill Rag magazine, October 2017
- 50 Great Figurative Artworks, PoetsArtists Magazine #89, Dec. 2017

== Permanent collections ==
- Museo Arte Contemporanea, Sicily, Italy
- Southern Alleghenies Museum of Art, Altoona, PA
- City of Washington, DC
- Pennsylvania College of Technology, Williamsport, PA
- Susquehanna University, Selinsgrove, PA
- City of Alexandria, VA
