= Barbara Januszkiewicz =

American artist

Barbara Januszkiewicz is a Washington, D.C.–based American multimedia artist, creative activist, and teacher known for her stained neo-Color field abstract expressionism paintings. She works in water-based media, specifically watercolor and diluted acrylic paint on unprepared canvas in the manner of Morris Louis and Helen Frankenthaler.

She uses brushes to control her fans of color rather than create pours in her color field works. Januszkiewicz's paintings are inspired by her interest in the overlap of the vocabularies involved with visual art and music. Her visual interpretation in painting employs large color fields that meld and overlap in translucent layers, evoking the rhythm and flow of her musical inspiration.

Januszkiewicz is listed as a notable artist presented at the Artomatic exhibition. She has done a documentary film work with musical composer Matthew Shipp, sculptor Hilda Thorpe, and painter Paul Reed.

== Education ==
Januszkiewicz was trained under the Chinese master Mun Quan at Jacksonville University in the late 1970s. Paul Reed, a member of the Washington Color School, mentored Januszkiewicz.

== Career ==
In 1997, Januszkiewicz began doing research on the Washington Color School by interviewing Hilda Thorpe. The interview was printed in the Washington Review Newspaper Volume XXV1 No.1 June/July 2000, and broadcast on Public Access TV stations as part of a Creative Vision for the Arts around the Metropolitan DC area. It is now archived on YouTube.

In 2014, Januszkiewicz continued doing historical research for the documentary film about the Washington Color School titled "Unprimed Canvas". Paul Reed acted as a historical consultant for the film which was released in 2015. Also in 2015 Januszkiewicz launched a pay it forward, noncommercial gallery space, Metro Micro Gallery in Northern Virginia. In 2016 while continuing to research the Washington Color School Januszkiewicz was granted access to the Melzac Collection, the CIA's so-called "secret" collection of works of abstract art.

In 2017, Januszkiewicz was commissioned to do a 30 foot long fine art mural, titled "Coming Together". This project was intended to help with the revitalization, preservation, and redevelopment of the Virginia Square area in Arlington, Virginia.

In 2019, Januszkiewicz was commissioned to do several works for the Arlington Partnership for Affordable Housing Columbia Hills Apartments in Northern Virginia. In 2020 Januszkiewicz's work appeared in "Statecraft: The Bush 41 Team", a TV Movie; which was released on PBS. In 2021 Januszkiewicz's work was shown internationally at the transcendence themed "Art in Embassies" exhibition in Turkey. In 2022 Januszkiewicz was selected to do the art installation at the new MetroStage theater of the new Alexandria Art District.

In 2025, her work was showcased at the American University Art Museum at the Katzen Arts Center as part of the "Women Artists of the DMV" exhibition curated by F. Lennox Campello.
