= Michael Janis =

American artist (born 1959)

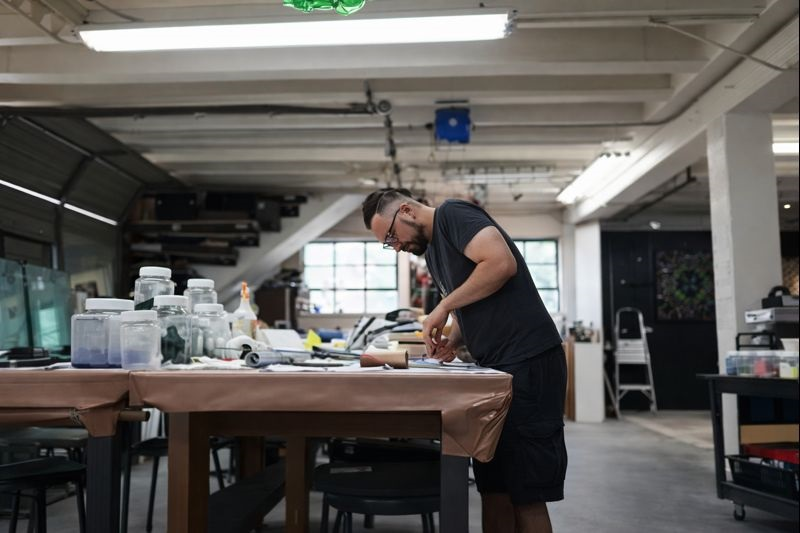
- Janis working in his glass studio
- Born: October 11, 1959 (age 67); Chicago, Illinois
- Occupation: Glass artist
- Known for: Sgraffito technique on glass
- Style: Glass art; kilnformed glass; sgraffito on glass
- Awards: Fulbright scholar (2012)

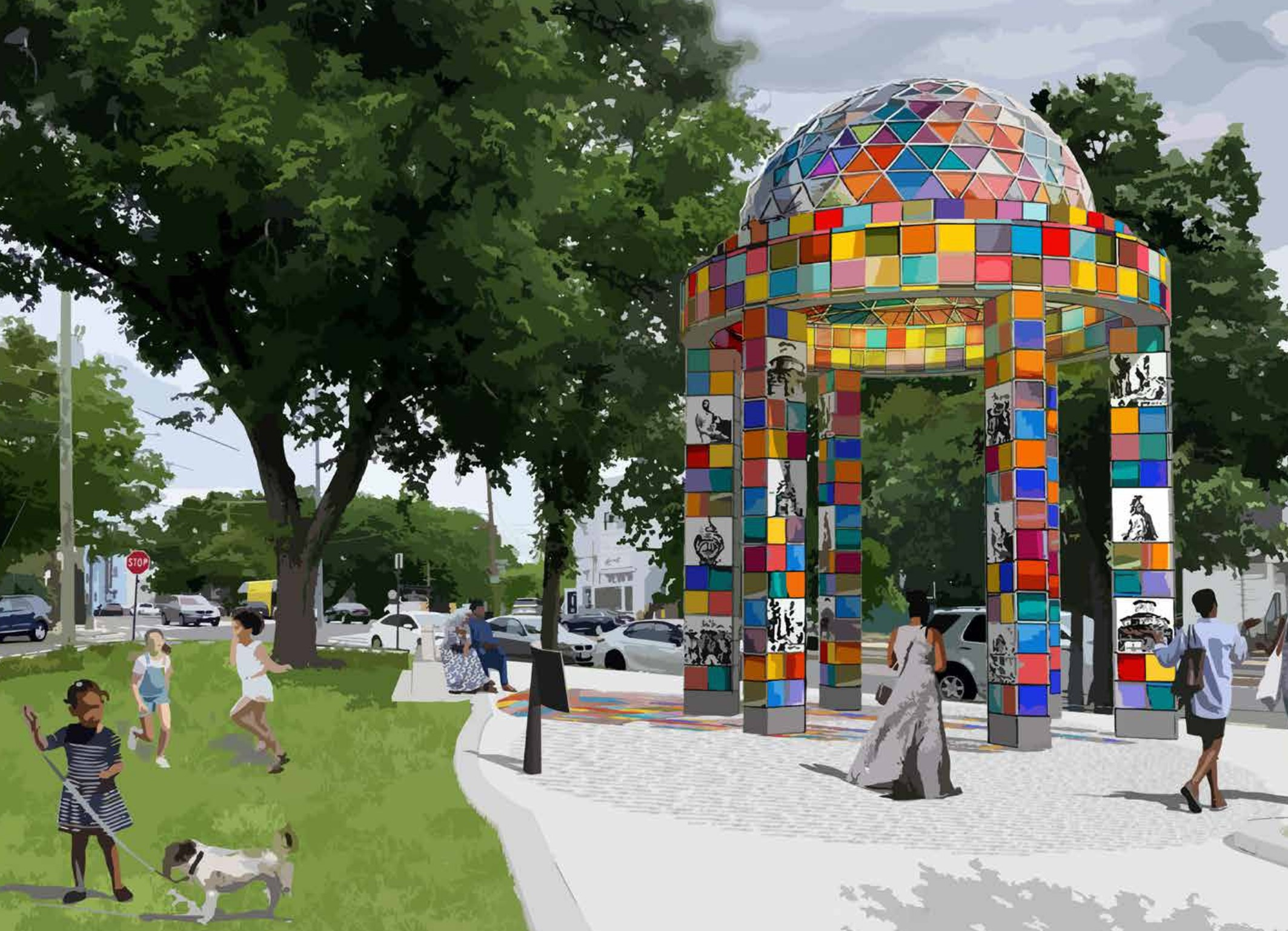
Proposal by Michael Janis for a public art memorial in Washington, DC honoring the enslaved people who built the United States Capitol.

Michael Janis (born 1959) is an American artist currently residing in Washington, DC, where he is one of the directors of the Washington Glass School. He is known for his work on glass using the exceptionally difficult sgraffito technique on glass.

Janis was a 2012 Fulbright scholar and as such he taught at the University of Sunderland in England, where he also taught at the UK's National Glass Centre, and also became an artist-in-residence at the Institute for International Research in Glass (IIRG). The James Renwick Alliance named him Distinguished Glass Artist for 2014, and subsequently Janis presented a talk about his work at the Smithsonian American Art Museum. In 2016, Janis was nominated and won the Washington, DC Mayor's Arts Award for Excellence in the Arts. He has also received over ten separate District of Columbia Commission on the Arts and Humanities' Artist Fellowship awards, most recently for FY 2025.

Washington, DC news organization, The DC Line, published an article about Janis titled “Art during COVID-19”. The article focused on how the pandemic changed his studio practice and artwork, highlighting the universal need for connections. "

In 2027, Janis is scheduled to teach at Pilchuck Glass School, where he brings the workshop Painterly Mark-Making in Kiln-Formed Glass during Session 3 ("Bricolage"), to be held from May 31 through June 11, 2027.

== Public art and memorial projects ==
Janis has completed public art commissions for civic, cultural, and healthcare facilities in Washington, DC and the surrounding region. His public artworks incorporate glass elements integrated into architectural settings and are developed in collaboration with community partners.

His commissioned projects include permanent installations for the Bladensburg Branch Library in Prince George’s County, Maryland, and Cedar Hill Regional Medical Center in Washington, DC.

- 2026 Enduring Dreams of Home, Harriet Tubman Elementary School, Washington, DC – 11-foot weathering steel public sculpture incorporating fractured Washington rowhouse forms and a cut-through portrait of Harriet Tubman.

In addition to completed projects, Janis was selected by the District of Columbia Office of Planning, in partnership with the DC Commission on the Arts and Humanities, to design a memorial honoring the enslaved people who built the United States Capitol. The memorial is planned for Ward 5 in Washington, DC.

== Early life and education ==
Michael Janis was born in Chicago on October 11, 1959, the youngest son of Paul and Alicia Janis. His mother is of Filipino, Chinese and Spanish ancestry, and his father is of German and Greek descent. Janis’ family moved soon after to suburban Niles, Illinois. He attended Maine East High School in Park Ridge, Illinois. After a 20-year career as an architect in the United States and Australia, Janis returned to the US in 2003 with a focus on working with glass. In 2005, he became a co-director of the Washington Glass School.

== Critical reception and awards ==
- Florida Art Glass Alliance's Emerging Artist Award in 2009.
- Bay Area Glass Institute's 2010 Saxe Fellowship.
- Named a “Rising Star” at the Wheaton Arts and Cultural Center in 2011.
- The James Renwick Alliance, in the awarding the 2014 Distinguished Glass Artist award, and in reference to Janis' sgrafitto technique, wrote that "his mastery of this difficult technique shows itself in the dreamlike images which he creates by 'drawing' with frit powders upon glass..."
- In a review of a Janis solo show in 2016, The Washington Post called his work and use of sgraffito technique "extraordinary."
- That same show was described by American art critic Dr. Claudia Rousseau as being "from both a technical and subjective viewpoint this is a striking show."
- The Pittsburgh Post-Gazette postulated about his work having a "Janus quality that suggests the conflict between one's public face and internal being."
- The Pittsburgh Tribune-Review added in 2015 that Janis "creates glass pieces with visual and spatial depth that are 'inspired by ways we transform ourselves'..."
- In describing the 2016 Mayor's Arts Awards for Excellence in the Art, Washington, DC mayor Muriel Browser noted the "incredible contributions of these individuals and organizations to the arts community in the District."
- In both a 2017 magazine article and associated television show on Maryland Public Television, American art critic Shawn Waggoner described Janis as a "translator of the subconscious... [who] creates intricate glass powder drawings that ask questions rather than answer them."
- In 2018 Prince George's Arts & Humanities Council awarded Janis an Artist Fellowship.
- 2019 Maryland's Goucher College series on Contemporary Glass Art described him as “one of the finest glass artists working in the field today”.
- The James Renwick Alliance selected Michael Janis' artwork on exhibit in the Artomatic 2.0 art fair for an award of excellence in the craft field, noting the introduction of social commentary to his sgraffito imagery in glass.
- In 2021, both the Detroit News and the Detroit Metro Times highlighted the long-distance collaboration between Janis and artist Tony Porto for the exhibition titled “Not Grandma's Glass.”
- The Lowe Art Museum at the University of Miami in Miami, FL named Janis as their 2024 “Distinguished Artist”. In March 2024, he presented lectures at the museum and workshops at the University of Miami's glass studios.

== Public art / commissioned artworks ==
- 2003 Lobby Sculpture, 1301 K Street Building, Washington, DC
- 2004 Outdoor Park Sculpture and Site Artworks, The Residences of Rosedale, Bethesda, MD
- 2005 Lobby Sculpture, Hatfield Clinical Research Center, National Institute of Health (NIH) Bethesda, MD
- 2005 Marlboro Courthouse Lobby Sculpture, Prince George's County, MD
- 2005 Sculpture A New World View, Baltimore Science Museum, Baltimore, MD
- 2006 Outdoor Park Sculpture - Liberty Plaza, Arlington, VA
- 2006 Woodman Residence, Washington, DC
- 2006 Wilson Building Public Art Collection, Washington, DC
- 2006 Contemporary Glass Craft Display, Luce Foundation Center for American Art, Smithsonian American Art Museum, Washington, DC
- 2006 Palomar Hotel Lobby Sculpture, Washington, DC
- 2008 Outdoor Park Sculpture – Liberty Center, Arlington, VA
- 2009 Outdoor Sculpture - Upper Marlboro Courthouse, Prince George's County, MD
- 2010 Vanderbilt University - Critical Care Tower, Nashville, TN
- 2011 Safeway Inc – Public Artwork for new LEED Certified Building, Bethesda, MD
- 2013 Library of Congress – Cast Glass Doors for the John Adams Building, Washington, DC
- 2014 DC Commission On The Arts & Humanities – Outdoor Public Art Sculpture, Unity Parkside Healthcare Facility, Washington, DC
- 2014 Fallen Heroes Memorial, Montgomery County Judicial Center, Rockville, MD
- 2014 Safeway Inc– Public Artwork for New Supermarket, Alexandria, VA
- 2015 Wisconsin Avenue Building Lobby, Bethesda, MD
- 2016 Laurel Library Public Art, Laurel, MD
- 2017 Public Artwork Sculptures for West Palm Beach Int’l Airport – West Palm Beach, FL
- 2018 William Beanes Community Center Public Art, Suitland, MD
- 2020 Peppermill Village Community Center Public Art, Landover, MD
- 2020 900 Thayer Avenue Public Art, Silver Spring, MD
- 2020 Inova Schar Cancer Institute Recognition Wall, Fairfax, VA
- 2021 “Essential Connections”, J-Sol Apartment Complex, Arlington, VA
- 2023 “Reading the Water”, Bladensburg Branch Library, Bladensburg, MD
- 2025 “The Legacy of the Land and the Waters”, Cedar Hill Regional Medical Center, Washington, DC

== Exhibitions ==
Janis has exhibited a 2011 solo show at The Fuller Craft Museum in Massachusetts, as well as the Portsmouth Art & Cultural Center, Portsmouth, VA, the Virginia Museum of Contemporary Art, Virginia Beach, VA, Ohio Craft Museum, Columbus, OH, Salisbury University, Salisbury, MD, Ukrainian Institute of Modern Art, Chicago, IL, Sunderland Museum, Sunderland, England, Flemish Center for Contemporary Glass Art, Lommel, Belgium, National Institutes of Health (NIH) Clinical Center Gallery, Bethesda, MD, Art Institute of Chicago, Chicago, IL, and Lynchburgh College, VA. In 2021 he was one of the artists invited to The Phillips Collection's juried invitational, Inside Outside, Upside Down exhibition, a show that was described by The Washington City Paper art critic as forcing "us to remember a time that left us 'confused, battered, and disoriented' through the eyes of 64 D.C.-area artists."

Tacoma, Washington’s, Museum of Glass acquired three glass sculptures by Janis for their permanent collection; first displaying his works in 2022 exhibit titled “Boundless Curiosity”. "

At the 2022 collateral exhibition Glasstress of the 59th Venice Biennale of Arts by Adriano Berengo, A special collaborative sculpture work by Tim Tate, Michael Janis and Chris Shea was installed in Berengo Studio's Art Space in Murano, an old glass making furnace abandoned in 1965 and transformed into an exhibition space. The show's large central cast glass and copper sculpture by the trio presented themes on climate change denial.
