= Mary Early =

American artist (born 1975)

- Born: 1975 (age 50–51)
- Known for: Sculpture, visual art, installation art
- Website: maryearly.com

Mary Early (born 1975) is an American sculptor. Some of her work is made using beeswax and wood.

Early was born in 1975 in Washington, DC. She studied at Bennington College. Her work had been exhibited at the American University Museum, Corcoran Gallery of Art, United States Botanic Garden, and the Washington Project for the Arts. She has also exhibited internationally in Austria and Germany. Early was commissioned to create a piece for the U.S. State Department Art in Embassies program which was installed in the United States Embassy in Amman, Jordan in 2018. Early is the director of Hemphill Fine Arts.
