= Blessed Art Thou =

Painting by Kate Kretz

- Artist: Kate Kretz
- Year: 2000s
- Medium: oil paint, acrylic paint, linen

Blessed Art Thou is an oil-and-acrylic painting by American artist Kate Kretz. It depicts actress Angelina Jolie as the Virgin Mary, hovering in the clouds with her children above a Wal-Mart store.

== Background ==
The painting directs attention to the celebrity worship cycle: each participant in the cycle perpetuates it while pointing a finger somewhere else. The title of the painting, “Blessed Art Thou”, is gotten from a line in the Catholic prayer “Hail Mary”: “…blessed art thou among women...”.

The painting was originally displayed in an exhibit that featured modern and contemporary art. The painting was exhibited at the Miami Art Fair in January 2007, and created a controversy that was covered by ABC, NBC, CBS, CNN, and Fox television networks, as well as The International Herald Tribune, The New York Times, and many other international news sources. In 2007 the painting was for sale for $50,000.

A full-size drawing study for the work was included in the exhibition "Beyond Re / Production: Mothering" curated by Felicita Reuschling for the Kunstraum Kreuzberg/Bethanien, Berlin in 2011.
