= Berengo Studio =

Murano art glass maker

Berengo Studio is a glass studio transforming the art of glass and glass art through collaborations with contemporary artists based in Murano, Venice, Italy. It was established in 1989 by Adriano Berengo, a Venetian entrepreneur whose goal was to renovate the tradition of Murano glass by crossbreeding it with the global culture of contemporary art.

== History ==
Berengo took inspiration from the work of Egidio Costantini and his Fucina degli Angeli, where in the 1960s artists such as Picasso, Chagall and Lucio Fontana came to work with glass. He began by inviting contemporary artists to work on the island and collaborate with the glass maestros to create sculptures in glass, one of his first major collaborations was with the Austrian painter Kiki Kogelnik. “I think what [Adriano Berengo] did is exceptionally brilliant. The idea, the concept is so strong,” Ai Weiwei once noted in an interview with TL Mag. “He believes in contemporary expression, but at the same time tries to develop this old technique into a new language … I’m a contemporary artist, but I am always learning and working with tradition.”

In 2009, in order to extend to reach and the significance of his project, Adriano Berengo initiated a new gallery, Venice Projects, to promote an evolution in the relationship between art and glass. Therefore, he organized a collateral exhibition of the Venice Biennale 2009 aimed at reporting the use of glass in contemporary art. The exhibition, called Glasstress, included historical pieces by Man Ray, Lucio Fontana, Robert Rauschenberg, Richard Hamilton, Giuseppe Penone and Joseph Kosuth, and more recent glass artworks by, among others, Tony Cragg, Lawrence Carroll, Chen Zhen and Jannis Kounellis. The experiment was so successful that Glasstress had a new edition at the 2011 Biennale, with several works specially commissioned for the event by outstanding artists, designers and architects (Barbara Bloom, Jan Fabre, Vik Muniz, Tony Oursler, Javier Pérez, Thomas Schütte, Kiki Smith, Yutaka Sone, Mike + Doug Starn, Patricia Urquiola, Zaha Hadid, Fred Wilson and many others).

Glasstress went on become an international exhibition, travelling the world to locations such as Stockholm, Beirut, Riga, and New York. Most recently in 2021 editions of Glasstress opened at the Boca Raton Museum of Art and later at The State Hermitage Museum in Russia.

In 2021 as a collateral event of the Venice Biennale of Architecture the Studio collaborated with the Italian company WonderGlass to present the design exhibition Glass to Glass. The exhibition provided the Studio with the opportunity to collaborate with designers such as Maarten Baas, and Sam Baron for the first time.

== See also ==
- Murano glass
- Glass art
- Glassblowing
- Glasstress
