= Washington Glass School =

School in Washington, DC, USA

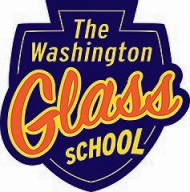
Logo of the Washington Glass School

The Washington Glass School was founded in 2001 by Washington, DC area artists Tim Tate and Erwin Timmers.

The school teaches classes on how to make kiln cast, fused, and cold worked glass sculptures and art. It is the second largest warm glass school in the United States.

== History ==
Co-Founder Tim Tate's glass sculpture at the 2000 Artomatic art event was acquired by the Smithsonian American Art Museum for the Renwick Gallery's permanent collection. That sale also provided the funds that started the Washington Glass School. Erwin Timmers' artwork was also on exhibit at Artomatic, where after the show, they began to collaborate, later teaming up to start the Washington Glass School & Studio. Michael Janis joined the school in 2003, and became a Co-Director of the Washington Glass School in 2005.

The school was initially located in the neighborhood where Nationals Park now stands, and as a result of the construction of the park, had to relocate to the current location in Mount Rainier, Maryland, just over the border with Washington, D.C.

In 2008, Artomatic organized an exhibit that focused on how three "glass" cities approach the sculptural medium and hosted by the Washington Glass School. The collaborative show was titled "Glass 3″ referencing the invited glass centers of Washington, D.C., Toledo, Ohio, and Sunderland, England. The exhibit featured nearly 50 glass artists and created an international partnership and strong relationships that led to more international collaborative interactions. Tim Tate and Michael Janis' Fulbright Scholarships were both completed at the University of Sunderland and the UK's National Glass Centre.

== Hot Shop Heroes Program ==
In 2025, the Washington Glass School hosted the second Washington, D.C.–area session of Hot Shop Heroes, an arts-based program originally developed by the Museum of Glass in Tacoma, Washington for military veterans. The ten-week workshop introduced participants to kiln-formed glass processes and basic steel fabrication, taught in collaboration with Washington Glass School instructors. According to WGS Co-Director Erwin Timmers, the program aimed to provide "a supportive environment for veterans to explore new materials and develop individual artistic approaches."

== Washington Glass Studio ==
The Washington Glass Studio was established as part of the school in 2001 to create site specific art for architectural and landscape environments. The studio draws on the Washington Glass School Co-director's educational backgrounds in steel and glass sculpture, electronics and video media, architectural design, and ecological sustainability.

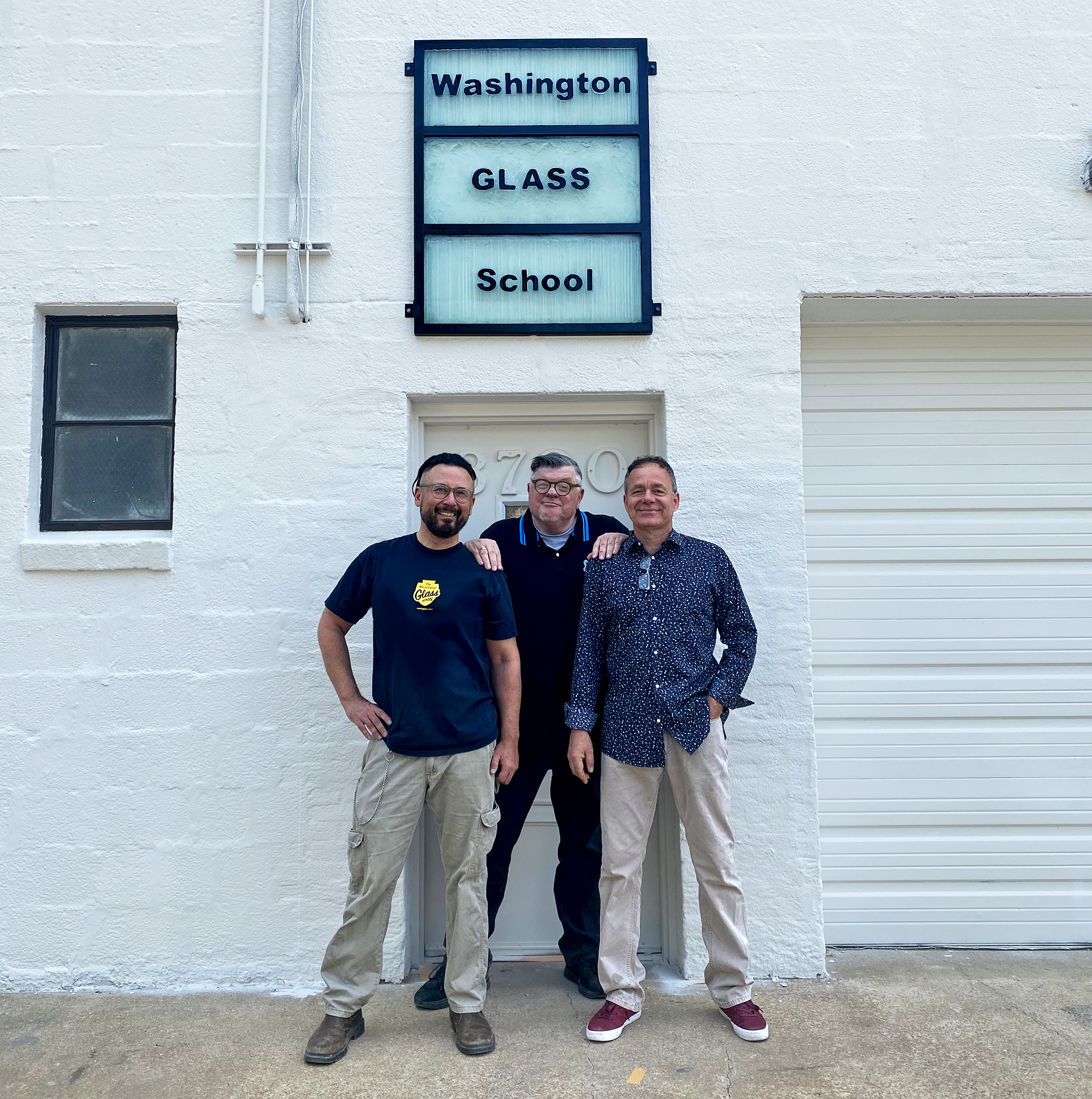
Washington Glass School Directors (L-R) Michael Janis, Tim Tate, Erwin Timmers

Notable public art projects by Washington Glass Studio include the monumental glass doors for the John Adams Building at the Library of Congress. Under the auspices of the Architect of the Capitol, the bronze doors to the John Adams Building were replaced in 2013 with code-complaint sculpted glass panels mirroring the original bronze door sculptures by American artist, Lee Lawrie, designed to commemorate the history of the written word, depicting gods of writing as well as real-life Native American Sequoyah. "

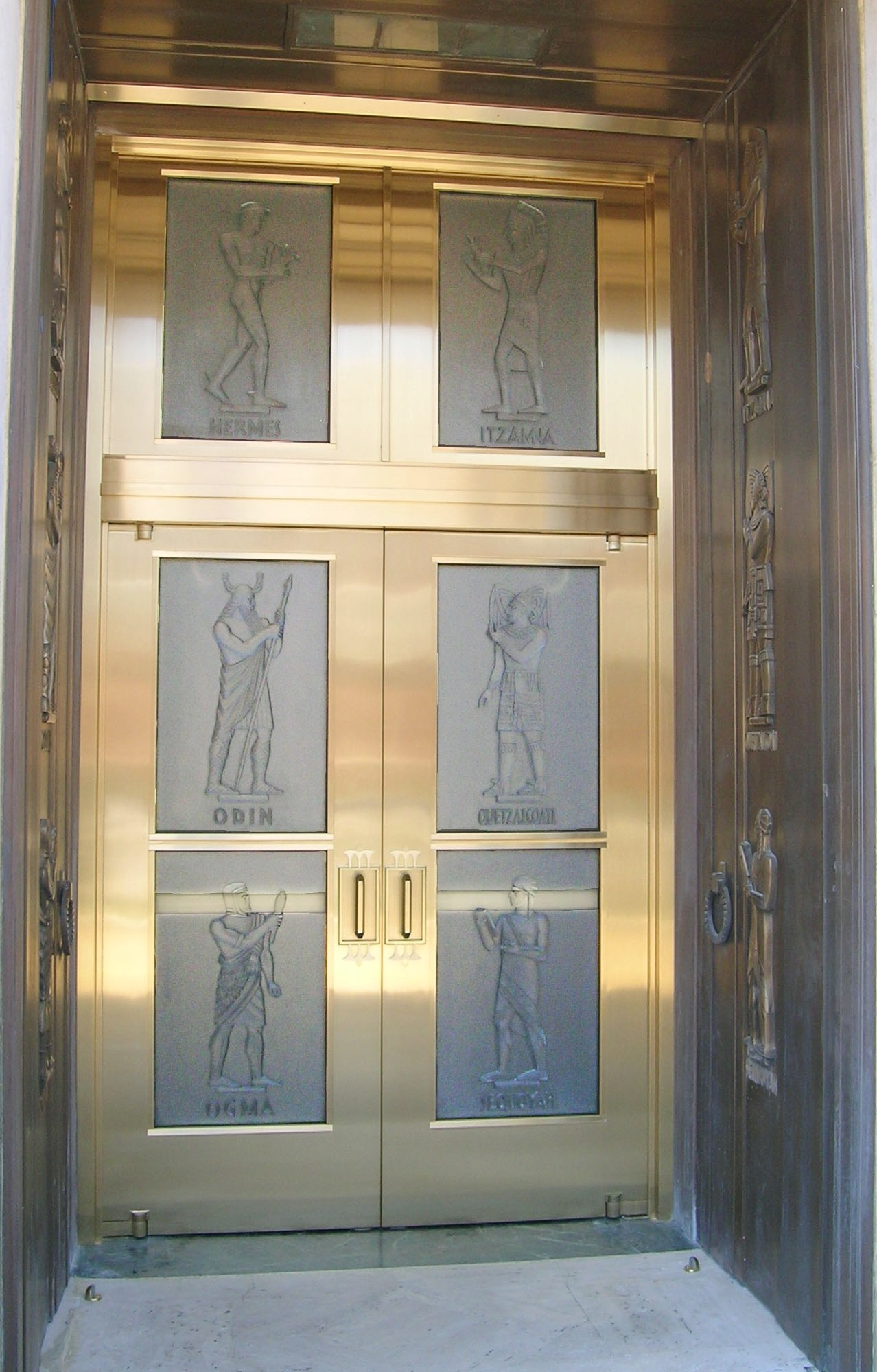
Monumental Glass Doors at Library of Congress John Adams Building.

The public art commission for artwork at the entrance to the Laurel Branch Library was awarded to the Washington Glass Studio in 2016. The 16-foot (4.9 m) high glass-and-steel sculpture was made involving the surrounding community and library groups. In a series of glass-making workshops, images of books and stories, education and learning, and shared aspirations were created at the Washington Glass School to be incorporated into the internally illuminated tower. In 2023, a second piece of public art for the Prince George's County Memorial Library system, "Reading the Waters," a 12-by-6-foot (3.7 m × 1.8 m) fused glass mural, was installed at the Bladensburg Branch Library as part of the facility's renovation. In 2026, Washington Glass Studio completed Enduring Dreams of Home, an 11-foot weathering steel sculpture for Harriet Tubman Elementary School in Washington, D.C. Designed by Michael Janis, the work incorporates fractured rowhouse forms and a cut-through portrait of Harriet Tubman.

== Faculty ==
=== Directors ===
- Michael Janis
- Tim Tate
- Erwin Timmers

== Glass Secessionism ==
The Washington Glass School championed a new art movement dubbed Glass Secessionism to "underscore and define the 21st Century Sculptural Glass Movement and to illustrate the differences and strengths compared to late 20th century technique-driven glass. While the 20th century glass artists contributions have been spectacular and ground breaking, this group focuses on the aesthetic of the 21st century. The object of the Glass-Secession is to advance glass as applied to sculptural expression; to draw together those glass artists practicing or otherwise interested in the arts, and to discuss from time to time examples of the Glass-Secession or other narrative work." Reflecting the evolving nature of glass art, the name of the Facebook group was amended in 2017 to "21st Century Glass : Conversations and Images / Glass Secessionism".
