= New Orleans AIDS Monument =

2008 sculpture in New Orleans

The New Orleans AIDS Monument is a public, outdoor sculpture erected in 2008 on the grounds of Washington Square Park, near the corner of Dauphine St. and Elysian Fields Avenue in the Faubourg Marigny neighborhood of New Orleans.

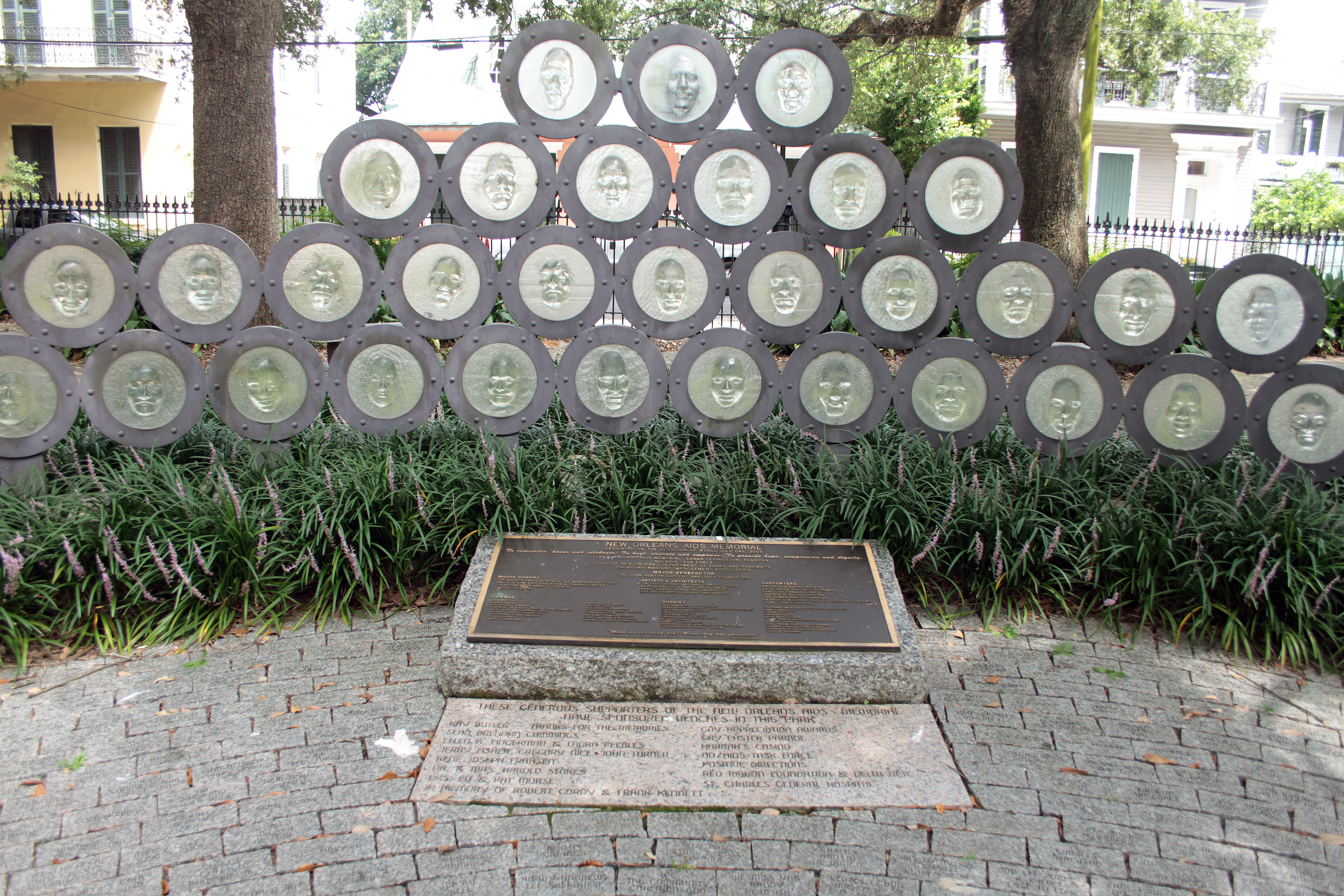
The New Orleans AIDS Memorial in Washington Square Park in the Faubourg Marigny neighborhood of New Orleans, Louisiana.

== History ==
In the late 1990s, and led by Susan Wallins Levingston, funds were raised to commission an international competition to design an outdoor monument to commemorate the victims and families of AIDS. The competition was won by Washington, DC based artist Tim Tate, with a design which has been described as consisting of "a curved steel structure from which the translucent glass faces of 34 men and women emerge." The selection committee described the sculpture as:

"Set in historic Washington Square Park, the New Orleans AIDS Memorial will provide a healing sanctuary for family and friends and will promote understanding of the human tragedy of the AIDS epidemic. It (was the) goal for the monument to create a public landscape where anyone who has been touched by AIDS can find comfort and consolation within a dignified and creative community setting. The memorial, made of concentric bronze circles framing inspirational multicultural cast glass faces, will provide a powerful yet comforting reminder of the meaning behind the memorial. Leading up to the memorial, a pathway of granite stones, inscribed with names of loved ones, will allow visitors to reflect on the way this disease has forever transformed our world."

The sculpture's title is "The Guardian Wall", and it is 8-foot-high by 35-foot-wide and the glass components of the sculpture are cast glass depictions of faces and words such as "friend," "lover", and "son." The 34 faces have also been described as guarding "those whose names are engraved into paving stones below, people who have died from AIDS as well as people honoured for their efforts in fighting the disease."

The Tate-designed sculpture was cast and built by New Orleans artist Mitchell Gaudet. The sculpture was unveiled on November 30, 2008.

== Use ==
Since its unveiling in 2008, the sculpture has become a central focus point for multiple LGBT and AIDS celebrations, commemorations, and tourism. Each year on World AIDS Day, the City of New Orleans hosts a wreath laying ceremony at the site of the monument.
