= Glasstress =

Glasstress is a recurring exhibition that brings together art by contemporary artists made with glass. Launched in 2009 as a collateral exhibition of the Venice Biennale of Arts by Adriano Berengo as a way of showcasing the works produced by Berengo Studio, it has since had editions take place in 2011, 2013, 2015, 2017, 2019, 2021 and 2022.

The mission of Glasstress is to show how contemporary artists use glass as an incomparable medium for their expression. For a long time, especially in Venice and Murano, glass has been generally associated to decoration, whereas its relevance for outstanding accomplishments by great artists was neglected. The Bride Stripped Bare by her Bachelors, Even, also known as The Large Glass by Marcel Duchamp (1915–23, Philadelphia Museum of Art) might be considered as a seminal milestone. But in recent years an increasing number of artists have taken up working with glass for their creations, and Glasstress is the first initiative aimed at documenting and promoting this trend. The exhibition furthers the mission of Berengo Studio to promote the use of glass in the world of contemporary art, and although it frequently holds editions in Venice it has also evolved into a travelling exhibition.

== Glasstress 2009 ==
Glasstress 2009 (June 6 - November 24), curated by the glass expert Rosa Barovier Mentasti and the art historian Laura Mattioli Rossi, was mainly a historical display of masterpieces of art glass from 1920 to the present times. The rooms of Palazzo Cavalli-Franchetti, facing the Canal Grande, hosted artworks by Josef Albers, Man Ray, Anton Pevsner, Jean Arp, Lucio Fontana, Robert Rauschenberg, Richard Hamilton, Joseph Kosuth, Louise Bourgeois. Some of the artworks had been expressly made for Glasstress by artists such as Tony Cragg, Jan Fabre, Orlan, and Fred Wilson, who have been invited to work in his glass studio in Murano by Adriano Berengo, the inventor of Glasstress.

Works include Hye Rim Lee's Crystal City Spun, a 3D animated video animation.

== Glasstress 2011 ==
Glasstress 2011 (June 4 – November 27) has been curated by Bonnie Clearwater, Lidewij Edelkoort, Peter Noever and Demetrio Paparoni. The 2011 edition took place in two different sites, Palazzo Cavalli-Franchetti, and the Berengo Centre for Contemporary Art and Glass, in Murano. Glasstress 2011 focused on the complex relationship that ties art, design and architecture together in an age thought to have moved beyond modernism. The exhibition, produced by Venice Projects, a partnership between Adriano Berengo and Susan Scherman, was presented in collaboration with MAD, the Museum of Arts and Design, New York.

== Glasstress 2013 ==
Glasstress 2013: White Light/White Heat (June 1 – November 24) was a Collateral Event of the 55th Venice Biennale, curated by James Putnam and Adriano Berengo. It featured the artwork of over 66 artists, including: Tracey Emin, Tony Oursler, Jaume Plensa, Koen Vanmechelen and Ursula von Rydingsvard.

The exhibition took place in three locations: Palazzo Cavalli-Franchetti / Veneto Institute of Sciences, Arts and Letters, the Berengo Center for Contemporary Art and Glass on the island of Murano, and next to the Grande Confraternity School of San Teodoro at San Marco.

== Glasstress 2015 ==
Glasstress 2015: Gotika (May 9 – November 15) was a collateral event of the 56th Venice Biennale of Art. Organized by The State Hermitage Museum, Berengo Studio, and Fondazione Berengo, it was curated by Dimitri Ozerkov and Adriano Berengo. In 2016, the exhibition travelled to Russia and was presented at the State Hermitage Museum in St. Petersburg. The exhibition included artworks from Olafur Eliasson, Erwin Wurm, Jaume Plensa, Tony Cragg and Jake and Dinos Chapman.

== Glasstress 2017 ==
Glasstress 2017 (May 11 – November 26) was a significant evolution from previous years. For the first time, it was a stand alone exhibition which took place during the Venice Biennale of Art. It was curated by Dimitri Ozerkov of the State Hermitage Museum, Herwig Kempinger the president of the Vienna Secession, and Adriano Berengo with consultation by Clare Phyllis Davies of the Metropolitan Museum of Art in New York.

The exhibition included artworks by some of the most significant contemporary artists including Ai Weiwei, Shirazeh Houshiary, Vik Muniz, Sarah Sze, and Karen LaMonte.

== Glasstress 2019 ==
Glasstress 2019 (May 8 – November 24) was a special year. Ten years of Glasstress coincided with the thirty year anniversary of Berengo Studio and so Adriano Berengo decided to bring the exhibition back to its roots in the Venetian lagoon. Held at the new Fondazione Berengo Arts Space in Murano it brought together the best of Berengo's archive along with a series of newly commissioned collaborations under the curatorial leadership of Belgian artist Koen Vanmechelen and Brazilian artist Vik Muniz. The show featured new collaborations with Prune Nourry, José Parlá and Xavier Veilhan. It also included a special project of newly created glass artworks by Robert Wilson, curated by Jean Blanchaert.

== Glasstress editions in 2021 ==
A year unlike any other 2021 brought new trials to the organisation of Glasstress, and yet the exhibition went ahead despite restrictions due to the global pandemic. In January an edition of Glasstress launched at the Boca Raton Museum of Art in Florida, USA, a highly anticipated follow up to the edition held in the same institution back in 2017. Later in the year in September Glasstress returned, this time to the State Hermitage Museum in Saint Petersburg, Russia with the title "Glasstress: Window to the Future".

== Glasstress 2022 ==
Coinciding with the 59th Venice Biennale, ‘Glasstress – State of Mind’ ran from 4 June to 27 November 2022, and brought together leading contemporary artists from Europe, the United States, Latin America and Africa. Glasstress opened in the heart of Murano at the Berengo Art Space Foundation in Murano, an old glass furnace abandoned in 1965 and transformed into an exhibition space to showcase the incredible sculpture being produced. Glass has always had a special significance for Murano, and for the occasion of the United Nations’ Year of Glass, it included a group show curated by Adriano Berengo and Koen Vanmechelen with the contribution of Ludovico Pratesi. The exhibit featured special works by artists Tony Cragg, Jaume Plensa, Bob Wilson and Jan Fabre and new collaborations with Tim Tate, Michael Janis and Chris Shea.
