= Joe Shannon (artist) =

Puerto Rican artist, curator, art critic, and writer born 1937

- Born: 1933 (age 92–93); Lares, Puerto Rico
- Occupations: Artist, art curator, art professor, art critic
- Known for: Narrative painting
- Website: www.joeshannonart.com

Joe Shannon (born 1933) is a stateside Puerto Rican artist, curator, art critic, and writer.

== Education ==
Shannon studied art at the Corcoran School of Art in Washington, D.C.

== Life ==
Shannon worked for nearly three decades at the Smithsonian Institution, also in Washington, D.C., as an exhibition designer and curator. Shannon also taught at the Maryland Institute College of Art in Baltimore and for many years was the Washington, D.C., art critic for Art in America magazine. He worked and exhibited most of his life based out of Washington, D.C., and currently lives in Glen Echo, Maryland.

Shannon was born in Lares, Puerto Rico.

== Artwork ==
Shannon's paintings have been exhibited in many galleries and museums and are in the permanent collections of the Brooklyn Museum, the Corcoran Gallery (now closed), the Hirshhorn Museum, the American University Museum, the Yellowstone Art Museum, and the Museum of Fine Arts in Boston.

His work belongs to the representational genre of painting. The paintings often address strong sexual, mythological, and narrative themes, and issues of sex and race routinely dominate his exhibitions. The Washington Post noted that "...Much realism nowadays is pre-digested pap, easy on the mind, easy on the eye. Shannon will have none of it. His art prohibits delectation." The Washington Post also stated that "Shannon is a masterful painter of the human figure."

Hilton Kramer, writing in New York Times, notes about Shannon and his artwork: “… But he is what he is, an artist of some independence and much energy and a furious talent who has declared his independence of everything current esthetic opinion has declared possible.” The New York Times art critic Grace Glueck also observed that "Mr. Shannon's brisk way of painting his urban grotesqueries - he gets it all down like a born storyteller without too much fuss over how - belies their disturbing content. They don't stay with you too long, but they do evoke our age of anxiety."
