= Nicolas F. Shi =

American painter

- Born: El Salvador
- Education: Architectural engineering
- Alma mater: Oklahoma State University
- Known for: Topographic-style paintings using contour lines
- Style: Abstract, topographic illusionism

Nicolas F. Shi is an artist in Washington, D.C. He is best known for paintings that create an illusion of depth through contour lines like those on a topographic map, with the space between adjacent ones of the contour lines being filled by a single color.

== Early life and education ==
A long-time Washington, DC resident, Shi was born in El Salvador to Chinese parents. In 1980, he left his war-torn country and came to the United States to attend college, receiving a master's degree in architectural engineering from Oklahoma State University in 1986. He practiced architecture and engineering for more than ten years before dedicating himself to painting. His work is influenced by his Latin American upbringing, his Chinese heritage, and his formal education in the United States. He mixes the bright colors of Central America with the harmony and simplicity of traditional Chinese painting and the boldness found in contemporary American art.

== Art ==
He has received several awards in the United States and El Salvador. His work has been shown in numerous exhibitions across the U.S., as well as in El Salvador at the Museo Nacional de Antropología Dr. David J. Guzmán, and in Spain, and has been featured on a postage stamp of El Salvador. In 2015, one of his paintings was selected for the Designed to Recycle public art program in Washington, DC. In 2021 he was one of the artists invited to The Phillips Collection's juried invitational, Inside Outside, Upside Down, exhibition, a show that was described by The Washington City Paper art critic as forcing "us to remember a time that left us 'confused, battered, and disoriented' through the eyes of 64 D.C.-area artists."

Shi's work is in the permanent collection of the Smithsonian Institution and the Inter-American Development Bank, both in Washington, D.C.

== Exhibitions ==
- 2009 - "Fusion: American Classics Meet Latin American Art", The Biggs Museum of American Art
- 2009 - Artomatic 2009
- 2010 - "Visions of Dignity", The Biggs Museum of American Art
- 2013 - "Herencia: Una fusión de colores, figuras y texturas", Universidad Ana G. Méndez exhibition, Wheaton, Maryland
- 2017 - "Inalienable Truths", George Washington University, Washington, DC
- 2018 - "Gateways / Portales", Smithsonian Anacostia Community Museum, Washington, DC
