= Yutaka Sone =

Japanese artist

- Born: 1965 (age 60–61); Shizuoka, Japan
- Known for: Contemporary art

Yutaka Sone (曽根 裕, Sone Yutaka; born 1965 in Shizuoka, Japan) is a contemporary artist who works in Belgium, China, and Mexico.

Sone studied architecture at Tokyo University of the Arts (東京芸術大学, Tōkyō Geijutsu Daigaku). From 2000 to 2003, he taught sculpture at UCLA as a visiting instructor.

== Exhibitions ==
Sone's work was the subject of solo exhibitions at Maison Hermès Le Forum, Tokyo from December 2010 to February 2010 and at Tokyo Opera City Art Gallery from January 2011 to March 2011. His 25-foot tall sculpture, titled Baby Banana Tree, was installed as a public artwork at the Boone Sculpture Garden, Pasadena City College in Pasadena, California, in 2009. Other recent solo exhibitions include Parasol unit for contemporary art, London (2007), David Zwirner, New York (1999, 2004, 2006, 2007, 2011, and 2016), Kunsthalle Bern, Switzerland (2006), Aspen Museum of Art, Aspen, Colorado (2006), The Renaissance Society at the University of Chicago, Illinois (2006), Museum of Contemporary Art, Los Angeles (2003), and Toyota Municipal Museum of Art, Toyota City, Japan (2002).

His work has been shown internationally including the Venice Biennale (2003) where he had a two-person exhibit in the Japanese pavilion, and numerous important group exhibitions, including the Museum of Contemporary Art Chicago, Illinois (2005), and the Whitney Biennial (2004).

== Collections ==
Sone's work is held in the permanent collections of the Tate Modern, London, and the Museum of Modern Art, New York, and the Museum of Contemporary Art, Los Angeles, among other institutions.
