= Clark V. Fox =

American painter

Michael Vinson Clark a.k.a. Clark V. Fox
- Born: 1946 (age 79–80)
- Education: Pratt Institute, Corcoran School of Art

Clark V. Fox (born Michael Vinson Clark, November 20, 1946) is an American modernist painter. He currently resides in New York City.

== Education ==
Clark V. Fox studied art at the Pratt Institute and the Corcoran School of Art.

== Artwork ==
Fox produced color field paintings while associated with the Washington Color School in the late sixties and simultaneously made figurative pop art. Over the course of his career, Fox consciously alternated between and synthesized these two schools while moving many times between Washington D.C. and New York City. Fox's association with the Washington Color School is reflected in the fact that he was called upon, as a recent graduate of the Corcoran School of Art, to reproduce 50 copies of "Popsicle" by Gene Davis, a leading light of the school, for a highly publicized giveaway in 1969.

Fox's 1968 painting The Three Crosses, which is part of the permanent collection of the Kreeger Museum in Washington, D.C., illustrates this connection with the Washington Color School. Fox is also known for his minimalist architecture paintings, which are held in numerous major museums and private collections, and for his pop representations of Gilbert Stuart’s iconic portrait of George Washington.

Beginning in the seventies, Fox used Mr. Peanut as a vehicle for ironically commenting on consumerist culture and brand-name icons, drawing on the analyses of the Situationist International. "From a pure art standpoint, Clark Fox's monumental painting 'Das Kapital,' with its reverbrating [sic] shadows of green, yellow and blue, is the show's masterpiece", The Houston Chronicle noted with regard to the Situationist-inspired "Corpocracy" exhibit in 2016 at Houston's Station Museum of Contemporary Art. Also in the seventies, Fox focused on paintings of windows, in fact, he "made hundreds of paintings of windows in Washington (where he grew up), in New York (where he studied at the Pratt Institute, and now lives) and in Los Angeles and Paris, where he travels whenever he can."

In 1991, "he founded Clark & Co., a small gallery in Canal Square", in the Georgetown neighborhood of Washington, DC. The gallery eventually "turned nonprofit and became the Museum of Contemporary Art (MOCA), has served as an incubator for local talent, consistently presenting shows that transcend age, gender and race and that challenge the status quo. The work of accomplished talents such as Manon Cleary and Joe Shannon hangs alongside that of such emerging artists as...", noted The Washington Post in 1995.

== Museum collections ==
- Smithsonian American Art Museum, Washington, DC
- Birmingham Museum of Art, Birmingham, Alabama
- Phoenix Art Museum, Phoenix, Arizona
- The Arkansas Art Center, Little Rock, Arkansas
- Colorado Springs Fine Arts Center, Colorado Springs, Colorado
- Delaware Art Museum, Wilmington, Delaware
- Kreeger Museum, Washington, DC
- Luther W. Brady Gallery, George Washington University, Washington, DC
- Miami Art Museum, Miami, Florida (today's Pérez Art Museum Miami)
- Station Museum of Contemporary Art, Houston, TX
- The High Museum of Art, Atlanta, Georgia
- Indianapolis Museum of Art, Indianapolis, Indiana
- The Speed Art Museum, Louisville, Kentucky
- Montclair Art Museum, Montclair, New Jersey
- Oklahoma City Museum of Art, Oklahoma City
- The Berkeley Springs Art Museum, Berkley Springs, West Virginia
