= Anne Cherubim =

Canadian artist

- Born: Canada
- Occupation: Artist
- Known for: Abstract painter
- Website: www.annecherubim.com

Anne Cherubim is a Canadian artist residing in the U.S., who is an abstract contemporary landscape painter. Cherubim was born in Canada and later started a family in Gaithersburg, Maryland. She is a Resident Artist at Artists & Makers Studios in Rockville, Maryland, and a member of the Gaithersburg Artist Collective.

== Artwork ==
Cherubim works predominantly in acrylic. Her artwork is also generally abstract in nature, although it is rooted in real life images and textures. Her works explore themes relating to the environment and stewardship of the planet.

Her paintings have been exhibited locally and internationally, and it has been displayed on unusual settings such as on billboards in Times Square, in a castle in Italy, and has been enlarged to 8 feet tall for a gigantic display at Baltimore Washington International Airport. Her exhibitions have also been critically reviewed in The Washington Post and multiple other art venues, art fairs, and galleries. Cherubim notes about her work:

... the way I see art, and create it. It is influenced by the world around me: by my time spent living in Santa Fe, New Mexico, as much as suburban Maryland, and the DC area. It is influenced by the energy and essence of having been a Montrealer for most of my life, as much as the desire to once again visit the ever-elusive island, where my parents' lives began.

The Washington Post has called her work compellingly otherworldly. One of her solo exhibition From Aloft & Through The Ether opened in 2019 at The Woman's National Democratic Club in Washington, DC.

== Exhibitions ==
- 2011 – Glenview Mansion, Rockville, MD
- 2011 – Kentlands Mansion, Gaithersburg, MD
- 2011 – Blackrock Center for The Arts, Germantown, MD
- 2011 – Montpelier Arts Center, Laurel, MD
- 2011 – The Center for Green Urbanism, Washington, D.C.
- 2016 – BWI Airport, Concourse D
- 2017 – Ephemera, Target Gallery, Torpedo Factory, Alexandria, VA
- 2017 – Artexpo New York, Pier 94, New York, NY
- 2017 – KFC Gallery, Kentlands, MD
- 2017 – Hill Center Galleries, Washington, DC
- 2015 – ArtSpace Herndon, Herndon, VA
- 2015 – Artomatic, Potomac, MD
- 2018 – One House, Touchstone Gallery, Washington DC
- 2018 – Bright and Bold, Serendipity Labs, Bethesda, MD
- 2018 – At Three, Artists & Makers, Rockville, MD
- 2018 – One House Project, Blackrock Center for the Arts, Germantown, MD
- 2018 – Open Studio Weekend, Artists & Makers, Rockville, MD
- 2019 – From Aloft & Through The Ether, Woman's National Democratic Club, Washington, DC
