= Ed Kretz Jr. =

American motorcycle racer

Ed Kretz, Jr. (May 3, 1932 – September 9, 2013), was an American professional motorcycle racer in the 1950s and 1960s. He was the son of well known rider Ed Kretz. He was known primarily as a TT and roadracing specialist, but he also was a leading off-road rider in the 1950s.

== Early life ==
Kretz, Jr. was born in Pomona, California. He grew up going to races with his father and worked in the family-owned motorcycle dealership in Monterey Park, California, from an early age. Kretz Jr. rode bikes as a child and began racing at the age of 16 on one of his father's Indian Scouts.

== Motorcycle racing career ==
Kretz Jr. raced in the 1950 Daytona amateur event, and led all but the final half mile of the 100-mile race, riding the same Indian on which his father won the Daytona 200 in 1937. The bike's engine seized with half a mile to go on the Daytona beach course and he coasted and then pushed the bike to the checkered flag, ending up in 12th. He then went on to win a 50-mile road race at the Santa Ana Naval Blimp Station, riding a Triumph.

Kretz won the amateur portion of the 1950 Laconia (New Hampshire) Classic. During his amateur racing career, Kretz wore the number 38, the same number that his father wore during his racing career.

By 1951, Kretz was a rookie expert and became national No. 33, and that year he finished third in the Peoria TT National.

Kretz missed a few seasons of racing while serving in the Armed Forces in Europe. He returned to full-time racing in 1955 and earned his only national victory in the Peoria TT in September of that year riding a Triumph and winning over eventual AMA Grand National Champion Brad Andres.

As a pro during the 1956 season, he twice finished in the top-five at Peoria, and finished tied for sixth in the final AMA Grand National Championship standings. He was again a top-10 rider in 1957 and earned one podium spot at Peoria.

While not racing the national circuit, Kretz was a leading off-road rider. Kretz Jr. was inducted into the AMA Motorcycle Hall of Fame in 2002.

== Personal life ==
By the early 1960s, Kretz and his wife, Elaine, had a daughter and he began to wind down his racing career. He continued to compete in West Coast off-road races, but retired from racing AMA nationals after the 1962 season.

When his father retired, Kretz took over running the family's motorcycle dealership in Monterey Park, CA until he sold the dealership in 1985.

On September 9, 2013, Kretz died while riding a motorcycle near his home in Sedalia, CO after apparently suffering a heart attack, then swerving off the road .
