= Kate Kretz =

American artist (born 1963)

- Born: 1963 (age 62–63); Grove City, Pennsylvania
- Education: University of Georgia (MFA)
- Occupation: artist

Kate Kretz (born 1963) is an American artist born in Grove City, Pennsylvania, and raised in upstate New York who paints and works in fiber-based art.

Kretz attended the Sorbonne in Paris, and obtained a BFA in drawing and painting from Binghamton University in New York and was accepted into the Hoffberger School of Painting, but attended and earned an MFA from the University of Georgia in Athens, Georgia.

Her painting is influenced by imagery of Catholicism and Technicolor films. She has created drawings in various media (including silverpoint), paintings, embroideries done with human hair, and a series of Psychological Clothing.

Kretz' painting, "Blessed Art Thou", executed in 2006, depicted actress Angelina Jolie as the Virgin Mary, hovering in the clouds with her children above a Wal-Mart store. This painting was exhibited at the Miami Art Fair in January 2007 and created a controversy that was covered by ABC, NBC, CBS, CNN and Fox television networks, as well as The International Herald Tribune and The New York Times. A full size study for the work was included in the 2011 exhibition "Beyond RE Production: Mothering", at the Kunstraum Kreuzberg/Bethanien in Berlin.

Kretz also creates fiber-based art work, that has been featured at Museum of Arts and Design in New York, Museum of Design Holon, The Van Gijn Museum in the Netherlands, Academy of Arts and Design at Tsinghua University in Beijing, The San Jose Museum of Textiles, the Society for Contemporary Craft, the Frost Art Museum and the Fort Collins Museum of Contemporary Art. Her Psychological Clothing series includes a Defense Mechanism Coat with 150 lb (68 kg) of roofing nails pushed through the surface, and a Vagina Dentata Purse. Another textile series features obsessive human hair embroideries that look like intricate drawings. In 2012, she began a series called "#bullyculture", a prescient body of work that focused on the U.S. culture that gave us Trump. Her MAGA Hat series featured the iconic red caps that she ripped apart and refashioned into "physical manifestations of the truth". The series was banned on Facebook and Instagram, and led to threats against the artist from right wing extremists.

Kretz wrote a book, Art From Your Core: A Holistic Guide to Visual Voice published in 2024 by Intellect Books, London.

In 2021, Kretz was diagnosed as 2E, twice exceptional, gifted/with autism.

In 2025, her work was exhibited at the American University Art Museum at the Katzen as part of the "Women Artists of the DMV" exhibition curated by F. Lennox Campello.
