= Erwin Timmers =

Dutch-born American artist (born 1964)

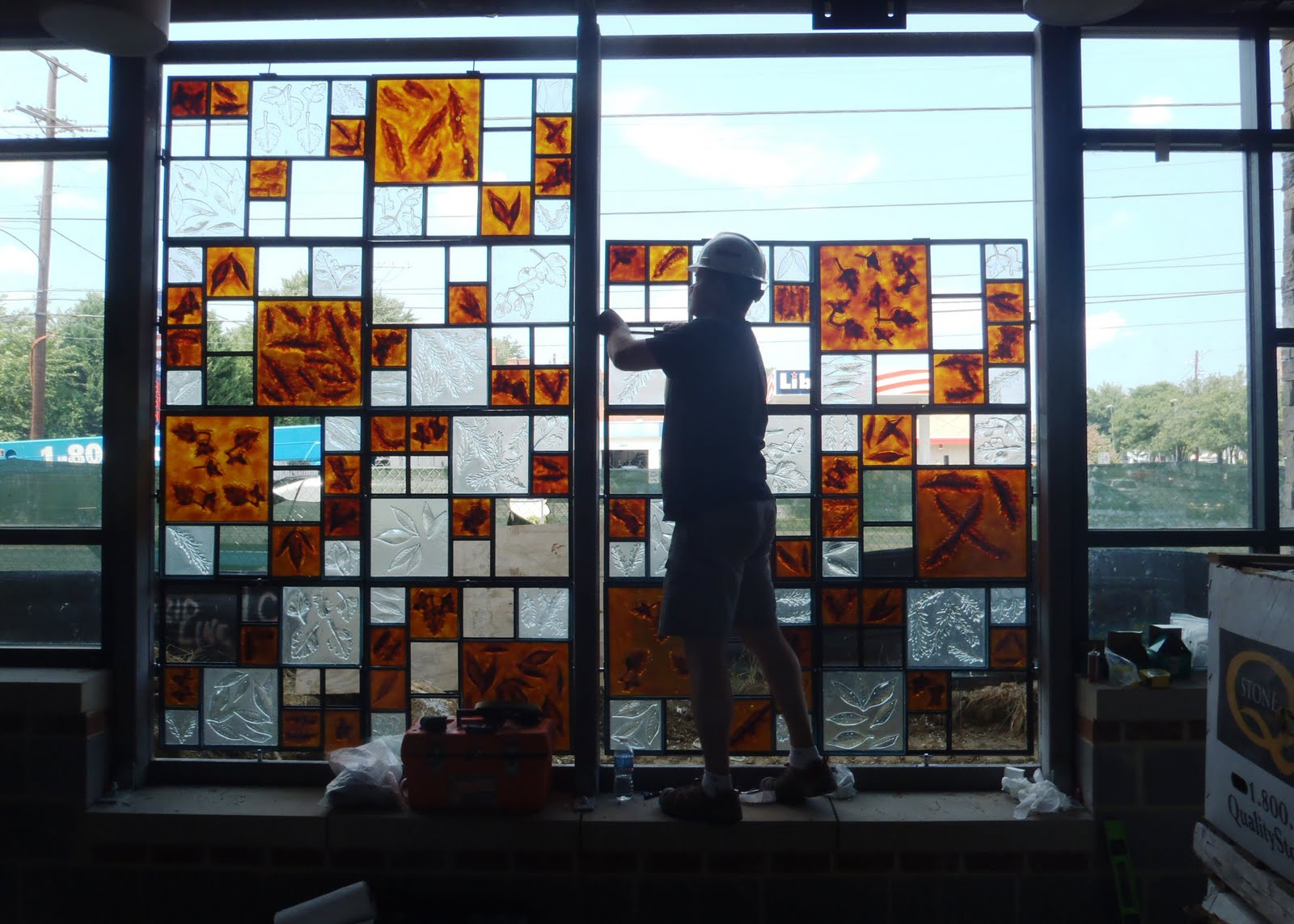
Erwin Timmers installs site specific artwork made of recycled glass and materials in Bethesda, MD

Erwin Timmers (born 1964) is a Dutch-born American artist and the co-founder of the Washington Glass School in the Greater Washington, D.C. capital area. Timmers has been recognized as one of the early "green or environmental artists", working mostly with recycled glass.

He was named the Montgomery County, MD Executive's Award Outstanding Artist of the Year in 2018, one of the awards in the 17th annual County Executive's Awards for Excellence in the Arts and Humanities. Timmers' sculptural works in sustainable design have been widely exhibited in many galleries and are part of many public collections, including many public artworks around the Greater Washington, D.C. capital region.

== Education ==
Originally from Amsterdam, Timmers moved to California and graduated from Santa Monica College of Design, Art and Architecture.

== "Green" artist ==
As noted in two separate 2007 interviews, Timmers notes that his "recycling heritage" in working with recycled materials comes from his up bringing in Holland. His 2018 Outstanding Artist of the Year award was based in part "for his work in both environmental art as well work as mentor/educator."

== Critical reception ==
- WETA Television noted that "Timmers’ sculpture calls attention to contemporary issues through a creative re-engineering of often-overlooked forms and concepts, often focusing on industrial salvage and recycling."
- In the presentation of Timmers' 2018 Outstanding Artist of the Year award, Montgomery County Executive Isiah “Ike” Leggett noted that “By their work, they lift us up and educate and inspire us. They make us laugh and make us cry. They make a good Montgomery County even better.”
- The Washington City Paper wrote that "Timmers has made it his mission to refashion discarded tempered window glass into sculpted pieces of art."
- The Washington Post wrote that "Erwin Timmers sets panels made of recycled glass into metal frames, using throwaway items such as plastic-bottle bottoms as molds."
- Timmers is represented by Zenith Gallery, one of Washington DC's longest operating art galleries and directed by former D.C. Arts Commissioner Margery E. Goldberg.

== Major public art commissions ==
- “Wall Pipes”, Starwood Urban Investments, Washington, DC, 2001
- Logo Sculpture, The Warehouse Theater and Cafe, Washington, DC, 2003
- Logo Sculpture, Carmen Group, Washington, DC, 2003
- Lighting and Sculpture, David Greggory Restau-lounge, Washington, DC, 2004
- “Chesapeake Memories”, The Residences at Rosedale, Bethesda, MD, 2004
- “Bling-Bling”, Pandamania, DC Commission for Arts and Humanities, Washington, DC, 2004
- H Street: Artistic Sign Project, DC Commission for Arts and Humanities, Washington, DC, 2004
- Logo Sculpture, Food and Friends Headquarters, Washington, DC, 2005
- “Driving Impressions”, Auto Aftermarket Industry Association, Bethesda, MD, 2005
- “A New World View”, American Physical Society, College Park, MD, 2006
- “Images of Healing”, National Institutes of Health (NIH), Bethesda, MD, 2006
- “Testimony of Community”, Prince George's County Courthouse, Upper Marlboro, MD, 2006
- Site-specific Sculpture, Environment Protection Agency Headquarters Ariel Rios Building, Washington, DC, 2006
- “Tapestry of Community”, Liberty Center, Shooshan Company, Arlington, VA, 2007
- “Stage is Set”, Private residence, Annandale, VA 2009
- “Rebirth/Renewal”, Prince George's County Courthouse, Upper Marlboro, MD, 2010
- Site-specific Sculpture, Vanderbilt University Medical Center, Nashville, TN, 2010
- “Glass on Stone”, Liberty Building, 1129 20th Street, NW, Washington, DC, 2010
- Site-specific sculpture, The Adele, Silver Spring, MD, 2011
- “Ingredients for Life”, Safeway Supermarket, Bethesda, MD, 2011
- “Eternal Light” Ner Tamid, Kol Shalom, Rockville, MD, 2012
- John Adams Building monumental doors, Library of Congress, Washington, DC, 2013
- The Aquilino Cancer Center, Shady Grove Adventist Hospital, Rockville, MD, 2013
- “Community Gateway” arch, Ward 7, Washington, DC, 2014
- Fallen Heroes Memorial, Judicial Center, Rockville, MD, 2014
- Untitled glass and light panels, JBG Companies/Directions in Art, Bethesda, MD, 2015
- “Involve Me and I Learn”, Laurel Library, Laurel, MD, 2016
- “Guidepost”, Airport Centre II, West Palm Beach, FL, 2017
- “Guardian”, Airport Centre II, West Palm Beach, FL, 2017
- In progress: 900 Thayer, Silver Spring, MD, installation 2019
- “Connecting Generations”: William Beanes Community Center, Suitland, MD, 2018

== Awards ==
He was named the Montgomery County, MD Executive's Award Outstanding Artist of the Year in 2018, one of the awards in the 17th annual County Executive's Awards for Excellence in the Arts and Humanities.

The James Renwick Alliance selected Erwin Timmers' artwork on exhibit in the Artomatic 2.0 art fair for an award of excellence in the craft field, noting his innovative use of recycled glass and his focus on environmental concerns.
