= Shanthi Chandrasekar =

American artist of Indian ancestry

Shanthi Chandrasekar is an Indian-American artist of Tamil descent. Her artwork is strongly influenced by her training in the traditional art form of Thanjavur painting. She resides in Maryland, in the Greater Washington, DC area. She was born in Tamil Nadu, India.

== Education ==
Chandrasekar studied at the Women's Christian College, in Chennai, India and then received a master's degree in Psychology from Annamalai University, Chidambaram, India.

== Artwork ==
Chandrasekar's art has been exhibited mainly in the Greater Washington D.C. area. She has twice been awarded the Maryland State Arts Council Individual Artist Award (2013 and 2016), as well as three times winner of Individual Artist grants from the Arts and Humanities Council of Montgomery County, MD in 2009, 2013 and 2016. In 2012 she was awarded the gold medal as well as "the fan favorite" medal at an art competition known as "The DC Art Decathlon" staged by the District of Columbia Arts Center.

The Washington Post has noted that her work "uses a central theme of weaving to explore everything from parallel universes to technological advancements to her own brain." The newspaper's art critic also noted, in a different review, that she "arranges women's faces into designs rooted in the traditions of southern India." The same critic had observed earlier, in a review of her 2013 solo show at the District of Columbia Arts Center that "perhaps art, craft, science and religion are different manifestations of the same fundamental thing. That's how it seems in the multimedia work of Shanthi Chandrasekar, which is derived from Hinduism, theoretical physics and family history." In a more recent 2019 review of her work at a group show at The American Center for Physics in College Park, Maryland, the Washington Post stated that her sculpture "Wormhole" was "the closest thing to a real-world diagram in the show, twists fabric into a narrow tunnel that links two circular nets."

=== The Kolam Project ===
In 2021 Chandrasekar led a nationwide project to create a traditional South Indian kolam to honor Vice President Kamala Harris. The kolam featured contributions from about 2,000 people around the United States. It was initially planned to be displayed near the Capitol during the inauguration, but due to security issues it was featured virtually as part of the Presidential Inaugural Committee's virtual welcome event.

=== Collections and awards ===
Her work is in the permanent collection of the city of Washington, DC, and the Works on Paper Collection of Montgomery County, Maryland. She is also a Fiscal Year 2020 announced winner of an Artists and Scholars Project Grant from the Arts and Humanities Council of Montgomery County to create a series of science inspired drawings. Some of those works have been installed in the Prayer and Meditation Room at Suburban Hospital in Bethesda, MD.

== Books ==
Chandrasekar has illustrated Katha Sagar: Ocean of Stories, 2016 Skinner House Books ISBN 978-8480174008, Sri Ramanujan - An Illustrated Biography and most recently Slime: How Algae Created Us, Plague Us, and Just Might Save Us ISBN 978-0544432932 by Ruth Kassinger.
