= Raquel Partnoy =

Argentine artist, writer (born 1932)

- Born: 1932 (age 92–93); Rosario, Santa Fe, Argentina
- Occupations: Painter; poet; essayist

Raquel Partnoy (born 1932 in Rosario, Santa Fe) is an Argentine painter, poet, and essayist.

== Biography ==
She studied at an art school in that city but it was after she got married and moved to the southern port city of Bahía Blanca in 1954, that she attended for several years the Buenos Aires's workshop of the influential Argentine painter and teacher Demetrio Urruchúa.

Partnoy's first show was at Van Riel Gallery in 1965, and she continued to paint and held exhibitions at diverse venues in Buenos Aires and other cities of her country until 1994 when she moved to the United States. She settled in Washington D.C. where she continued her artistic career. At the invitation of the Embassy of Argentina in Washington, D.C. Partnoy exhibited her series “Women of the Tango” and “Tango: Inner Landscapes” in 1997 and 2003, where she portrayed stories found in tango lyrics such of those of young women who were discriminated against and mistreated by society. She has also had solo exhibits at the B'nai B'rith Klutznick National Jewish Museum, Goucher College, and Washington's Studio Gallery.

Through her series of paintings “Surviving Genocide,” which was shown at the Martin Luther King, Jr. Library in 2003, Partnoy depicted her family experiences during the military dictatorship in Argentina (1976–1983) when 30,000 persons disappeared and were eventually killed by state terrorism. On January 12, 1977, her daughter Alicia Partnoy was kidnapped by the Army and disappeared for three and a half months. During this time they kept her in the concentration camp La Escuelita in Bahía Blanca. She was imprisoned for a total of three years in other jails. Both Raquel Partnoy's essay on “Surviving Genocide” and the images of her paintings on this subject, were published in The Jewish Diaspora in Latin American and the Caribbean: Fragments of Memory, Kristin Ruggiero, ed. Sussex Academic Press, UK, 2005.

She is the illustrator of The Little School: Tales of Disappearance and Survival, written by her daughter Alicia Partnoy.
