= Dana Ellyn =

American painter

- Occupation: Artist

Dana Ellyn is an American vegan artist who incorporates political and animal cruelty themes in her work. In 2008, Ellyn created paintings of every American President, as well as each of the 2008 Presidential candidates.

From May 2016 to May 2017, her portrait of artist (and husband) Matt Sesow was the introductory painting to Sesow's 'Shock & Awe' exhibit at the American Visionary Art Museum in Baltimore, Maryland.

From December 2018 to March 2019, her painting 'Baby Back Ribs' was exhibited in the 'Grotesque in Art' exhibit at the Museum of Art St. Petersburg in St Petersburg Russia.

Her controversial 2009 Blasphemy Day show received coverage by CNN, USA Today, Huffington Post and NPR. She paints from Mather Studios in downtown Washington, DC.

In 2025 her work was included in the exhibition Women Artists of the DMV: A Survey Exhibition at the American University Museum curated by Florencio Lennox Campello.

== Education ==
Ellyn earned a BA degree from The George Washington University.
