= Ric Garcia =

American painter (born 1968)

- Born: 1968 (age 57–58); Miami, Florida
- Education: University of Miami
- Known for: Printmaking & painting
- Website: http://ricgarciastudio.com

Ric Garcia (born 1968 Miami, Florida) is an American fine arts painter, digital printmaker, and curator of Cuban ancestry currently working and residing in the Greater Washington, DC area.

== Education ==
Garcia studied and received a BFA in Graphic Design and Illustration from the University of Miami in Florida.

== Life ==
Garcia's parents were Cuban political refugees who immigrated to the United States in 1966. He was born in Miami, where he was raised "surrounded by a close-knit Cuban American community who shared old-world values and traditions." In 2018, The Voice of America quoted him (in a review of an art show demonstrating "the richness and complexity of U.S. culture" as explaining that his parents "chose to come to this country that was offering asylum."

== Art ==
Garcia's artwork has been described as being "on the traditions of pop art …eliciting emotional reactions, introspective questions and celebrating Latino culture”, and even "Warhol-esque."

Picking up on that description, The Washington Post art critic Mark Jenkins, in a review of an immigration-themed show at the American University Museum, wrote "Ric Garcia updates Warhol by crisply and colorfully portraying edible products for the Latin market, with labels far funkier than any designed for Brillo or Campbell's." American University described the work as "Garcia’s widely exhibited paintings and pop art prints are a cultural mash-up of Spanish and American culture."

Garcia often incorporates superheroes, Latino food imagery (most commonly Goya Foods references), Latino cultural references, immigration themes, cinematic icons, and even gods into his work. In the 2016 Washington Post review of American University Museum's The Looking Glass: Artist Immigrants of Washington exhibition, the Post art critic described Garcia's work in the exhibition as being "simultaneously mythic and as modern as a can of Goya black bean soup."

In a review of his 2017 two-person show at Washington, DC's Foundry Gallery, the Washington Post art critic wrote that "Mid-20th-century superheroes and movie stars socialize with figures from Renaissance paintings in Foundry Gallery’s 'Dynamic Duos: Power and Form' Ric Garcia’s oils and prints feature DC and Marvel Comics characters..." The Washington Post further noted that the work "seems an intentional rejection of today’s crisp digital imaging." Along the theme of appropriated Latino food and drinks imagery, in 2020 Garcia showed a solo exhibition focused on the use of the Taino chief Hatuey in Latino food/drink imagery.

== Collections ==
Garcia's work has been acquired by the DC Commission on the Arts and Humanities for the Art Bank collection of the city of Washington, DC. It is also in the collection of the Arts and Cultural Heritage Division of The Maryland-National Capital Park and Planning Commission, and in the permanent collection of Prince George's County, Maryland.

== Awards ==
Garcia is a winner of the Maryland State Arts Council 2019 Individual Artists' Awards.
