= Muriel Hasbun =

Salvadoran photographer (1961–2026)

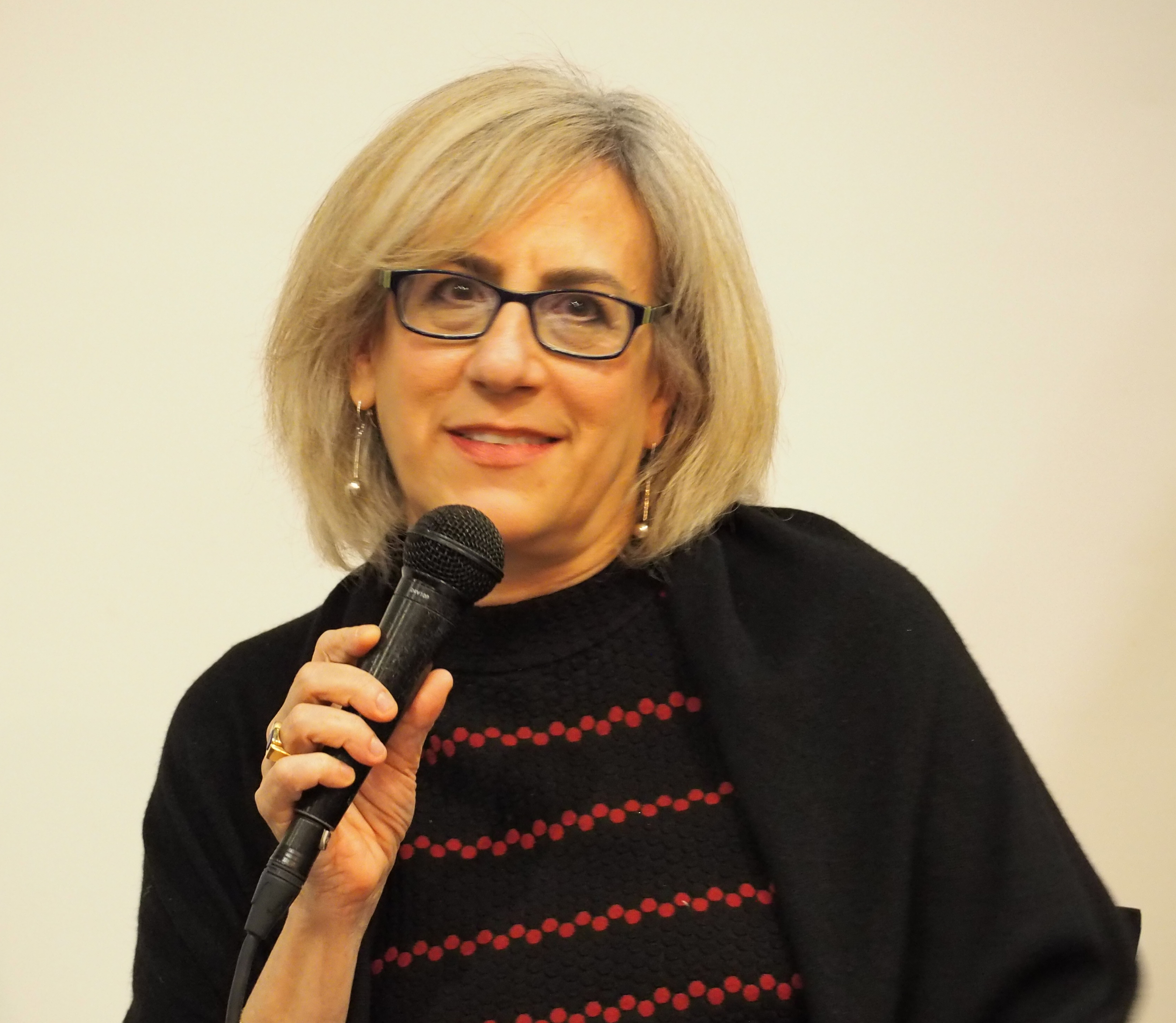
Hasbun reading at Busboys and Poets, Washington, D.C., 2022

Muriel Hasbun (born in San Salvador, 1961 - died in Silver Spring, Maryland, 2026) was a Salvadoran-American photographer and educator, best known for her series and archives exploring themes related to migration, displacement, and identity. Hasbun utilized her multicultural family background to produce a series of photographs that explored diverse heritages and the idea of “terruño” (homeland), especially through her Christian Palestinian and Polish-Jewish roots. Hasbun was recognized for her ethereal, layered aesthetic that bridged the gap between archives and lived experiences.

== Early life ==
Muriel Hasbun was born in 1961 in San Salvador, El Salvador, but she originated from a multicultural background. Her father, Antonio Hasbun Z., was a Salvadoran-born dentist and amateur photographer of Christian Palestinian descent. His family left Bethlehem at the beginning of the 20th century, escaping from the Ottoman army conscription during World War I. Similarly, her mother, Janine Janowski, whose family was originally from Poland, was born in France and survived the Nazi regime and the Holocaust by hiding in Auvergne, France. She later immigrated to El Salvador in 1958, serving as a teacher for the children of the French consul.

In 1979, Hasbun left El Salvador at the onset of the Salvadoran Civil War. The artist lived in Paris for her first year of college, but moved to Washington, D.C., where she graduated with a degree in French Literature from Georgetown University and pursued a Master of Fine Arts in Photography from the George Washington University.

== Academic career ==
Muriel Hasbun’s career is marked by her long-standing trajectory at the Corcoran School of the Arts and Design at the George Washington University. Currently, Hasbun is a professor Emerita at GWU, where she previously served as professor and Chair of Photography. The photographer also expanded her academic influence as a visiting artist at prestigious universities. She served as the 2021-2022 Estelle Lebowitz Endowed Visiting Artist at Rutgers University with her photograph series Seismic Traces.

Muriel Hasbun is a recipient of many awards, including the Smithsonian Artist Research Fellowship, the Howard Chapnick Grant of the W. Eugene Smith Memorial Fund for laberinto projects (2014); a Museums Connect grant funded by the U.S. Department of State and the American Association of Museums (2011-12); the Corcoran’s Outstanding Creative Research Faculty Award (2007) and a Fulbright Scholar Grant (2006-2008).

== Transnational projects ==
In 2012, following her mission as an educator, Hasbun founded Laberinto Projects, a cultural initiative focused on fostering art practices and education by exploring issues of migration, transnational identity, and social inclusion. The project is based in El Salvador, and it provides a framework for cultural studies through archives, including the collections of Galería el Laberinto during the Salvadoran Civil War. The Laberinto Projects initiative hosts residency programs, including a series of workshops with the assistance of the Master Artist Muriel Hasbun.

== Artistic practice ==
Her work is rooted in merging personal memory with collective archives. In her series Tracing Terruño, Muriel explores the concept of terruño (homeland), utilizing her Christian Palestinian, Polish-Jewish, and Salvadoran heritages to create an idea of transnational identity and postmemory photography. In general, Hasbun takes multiple exposures and layering of photographs, letters, documents, and personal objects to create a collection of series of photographs, in which most connect her family’s background to a broader collective narrative of migration.

Another example of the use of personal objects is her series X post facto, in which she continues her investigation of archival memory through her father’s negatives when he worked as a dentist. The selected 32 pieces for X post facto were, in fact, a collection of X-rays to identify bodies of individuals who died in the Salvadoran Civil War. This series bridges her family archives to the history of El Salvador and the Civil War, which was the event that motivated Muriel Husband to migrate to the United States.

Her series Santos y Sombras also serves as a reflection on Hasbun's hybrid identity as a multiculturally raised individual. She layers images of her ancestors with symbols of diverse Christian, Palestinian, and Polish-Jewish roots. Through the layering process, Hasbun bridges the gap between her European and Middle Eastern heritage and her lived experience in El Salvador, creating what she terms "postmemory" photography.

== Collections ==
National Gallery of Art, Washington, DC

Whitney Museum of American Art

Smithsonian American Art Museum
