= Robin Bell (artist) =

American multimedia visual artist (born 1979)

Robin Bell (born 1979) is an American multimedia visual artist currently living and working in Washington, DC.

== Artwork ==
Although trained as a printmaker, Bell is better known for his fine art video work as a projectionist, which over the years has been exhibited/projected at a wide and diverse set of venues, such as The Hollywood Bowl, Artomatic, the Kennedy Center, the Phillips Collection and others.

Bell began gaining national and international attention upon President Trump's election, when he focused his projection work to deliver highly negative political messages in various "unauthorized" venues such as the Trump International Hotel in Washington, D.C. Referencing that particular projection in 2017, The Los Angeles Times noted that it "began to go viral on social media almost as it was happening."

According to The Washington City Paper, these political projections "unlocked" the path to his first solo show at former Corcoran Gallery of Art in Washington, DC, and as noted by the Associated Press: "His work has turned into an unexpected business opportunity. Activist groups have paid his crew to travel as far away as Finland to project images on prominent buildings." In 2019, The New York Times art critic Jillian Steinhauer noted that Bell's projections veer "closer to propaganda than art."
