= Diane Tuckman =

American artist (1935–2024)

- Born: March 24, 1935; Egypt
- Died: October 25, 2024 (aged 89)
- Occupation: Artist
- Known for: Silk painting, author
- Website: www.iteachsilkart.com

Diane Tuckman (March 24, 1935 – October 25, 2024) was an American artist. She is known for her silk painting work and as an author of several books on the subject with Jan Janas. She resided and worked in Lanham, Maryland, in the Greater Washington, D.C. area for many years until her death in 2024.

Tuckman was born in Egypt.

== Early life and work ==
In an interview with The Washington Free Beacon, Tuckman recalled that while living in Egypt as a child during World War II, "they were shooting Jewish girls in the street.…My family and I escaped in 1948 and went to France." Though less harrowing, even in France "it was a very difficult time after the war, with ration tickets and very little housing." Tuckman moved to the United States in 1958 soon after marriage. Tuckman is credited as one of the seminal artists who helped to popularize silk painting in the United States through her books, and when her company (Ivy Imports) was the first US-based company to "import the French dyes needed to paint on silk".

Tuckman was also the co-founder of the nonprofit organization Silk Painters International (SPIN), which in 2000 helped to organize the Second International Silk Painting Congress at George Mason University. SPIN now routinely organizes a silk painting biennial; the most recent one was held in 2018 in Gatlinburg, TN. The organization now has more than 500 members.

== Books co-authored with Jan Janas ==
- The Complete Book of Silk Painting. Cincinnati, OH: North Light. ISBN 978-0891344223.
- Creative Silk Painting. Cincinnati, OH: North Light. ISBN 978-0891346104.
- The Best of Silk Painting. Cincinnati, OH: North Light. ISBN 978-0891347293.
- The Fine Art of Painting on Silk. Atglen, PA: Schiffer, 2018 ISBN 978-0764355356.

== Exhibitions ==
Tuckman has exhibited and curated silk art exhibitions around the Greater Washington, DC region. She has been referred to as "a silk painting pioneer in America, she teaches, paints, and exhibits her silk paintings, as well as promotes the art form through her educational programs."
