= Nate Lewis (artist) =

American artist

Nate Lewis (born 1985) is an American artist.

== Art ==
Lewis graduated from Virginia Commonwealth University with a Bachelor of Science in nursing in 2009. Lewis' artwork borrows heavily from that medical training to deliver works that he describes as being influenced by the "rhythms and records of people’s lives... vulnerability, empathy and care." As the self-taught artist's work and exposure progressed, he "started using African-American figures and thinking about empathy and what is empathy outside of the hospital." The Washington City Paper described his process as "...The works are compositionally minimal, even austere—mostly portraits that are simple and straight on, printed on porous paper in stark black and white. Lewis then sculpts the paper by snipping, slicing, and perforating the silhouette of the bodies to create three-dimensional figures that emerge from the canvas."

In 2019, together with street artist Shepard Fairey and others, Lewis began exploring the use of billboards for political art purposes to create anti-President Trump messages ahead of the President's visit to Cleveland.

== Awards ==
Lewis was a 2014 Bombay Sapphire Artisan Series Regional Winner (Washington DC). His work has been included in the US Art in Embassies Program, and is in the permanent collections of the University of Maryland and the Yuko Nii Foundation. Lewis was selected in 2014 as the inaugural resident artist for Martha's Vineyard Art on the Vine Program.

== Critical reception ==
In a review of his first solo show, The Washington City Paper observed that "Lewis’ medical training and saint-like patience from years of caretaking are apparent in his practice. The paper-cutting process is laborious and detailed; it often takes him up to 38 hours to complete larger works..."

In a separate review of his 2017 solo show in Washington, DC, The Washington Post art critic observed that "to Nate Lewis, whose "Tensions in Tapestries"... the African American body is a landscape to be transformed. He cuts and scrapes black-and-white photographic portraits, removing pigment while adding patterns and flocked textures. The effect recalls African weaving and skin embellishment, but also reflects the influence of the D.C. artist's job as an intensive-care nurse, seeking to heal the most damaged." In light of the artist's first solo exhibition at Fridman Gallery in New York, Ocula Magazine observes that Lewis' 'Incisions and gashes are not sewn back together, and a mending never happens. Instead, these wounds remain wide open, irremediable narratives in their current condition.'

In 2018, the Chicago Tribune isolated his work as "must see" at the Chicago EXPO and noted that his "paper sculptures are ethereal depictions of a black masculine body, resulting in an anatomical figure made of whimsical, contradictory patterns."

In 2020, The New York Times wrote that his debut New York City solo show "developed a visual language in the rhythms of EKGs. Now, his intricate works on paper take the scalpel to society."

=== Solo and two person exhibitions ===
- 2016 Biological Tapestries 1st Movement, Morton Fine Art, Washington DC
- 2016 Cheryl Derricotte and Nate Lewis: Fragile Vessels, Loyola University, Baltimore, MD
- 2017 Tensions in Tapestries, Morton Fine Art, Washington DC
- 2017 Mosaic Project, Pennsylvania College of Art & Design, Lancaster, PA
- 2018 Contemporary African Art Fair, Special Projects, Pioneer Works, Brooklyn, NY
- 2018 Latent Tensions at Spring Break Art Show, New York City
- 2018 Hidden Tensions, Morton Fine Art, Washington, DC
- 2019 Armory Show, Fridman Gallery, New York
- 2020 Solo, Fridman Gallery, New York
