= Patricia Goslee =

American artist

- Born: San Diego, CA
- Education: University of Georgia, Catholic University of America
- Occupation: Artist

Patricia Goslee (born San Diego, CA) is an American artist currently residing in Washington, DC.

== Education ==
Goslee received her BFA in 1982 from the University of Georgia, and her MFA in 1988 from Catholic University in Washington, DC.

== Critical coverage ==
Her work has received significant critical coverage over the years.

In describing her 2017 works, such as the one titled "Confluence", The Washington Post described it as "intricate and involving, are among the best she's shown in recent years. The use of stenciled patterns recalls fabric design and other domestic crafts, but that folksy quality is countered by the visceral elements."

Two years later, in 2019, The Washington Post notes that "Goslee’s recent paintings are incited by real-world events. In her statement, the artist explains that these 2018 pictures are a reaction to gentrification in her D.C. neighborhood. This theme is not overt, although figures and architectural details are nearly recognizable within the mostly abstract compositions." In reviewing another solo show in 2022, the same art critic observed that "Several of the paintings are based on complex scientific matters and are displayed next to notes on their ecological messages. There’s a sense of unease to much of the show..."

== Curatorial projects ==
2003 Rising Voices, DCAC, Washington, DC

2004 Meanwhile (While You Were Sleeping) recent work by Lynn Putney

2004 On the Line: machines, maps, and memory, MAP, Baltimore, MD (with Karey Kessler)

2004 On the Line: machines, maps, and memory, DCAC, Washington, DC (with Karey Kessler)

2010 Mapping Source, International Arts & Artists, Washington DC

2014 Young Contemporaries, Hillyer Art Space, Washington DC

== Awards ==
She is a four time winner of the DC Commission on the Arts and Humanities purchase awards for the permanent collection of the city of Washington, DC.

== Collections ==
Goslee's work is included in the permanent collections of:

- US Embassy in Ethiopia
- US Embassy in Nepal
- Art Bank Collection of Washington, DC
- National Institutes of Health
- Children’s National Medical Center
- Union of Concerned Scientists
- University of Georgia
