= Tim Tate =

American artist and the co-founder of the Washington Glass School

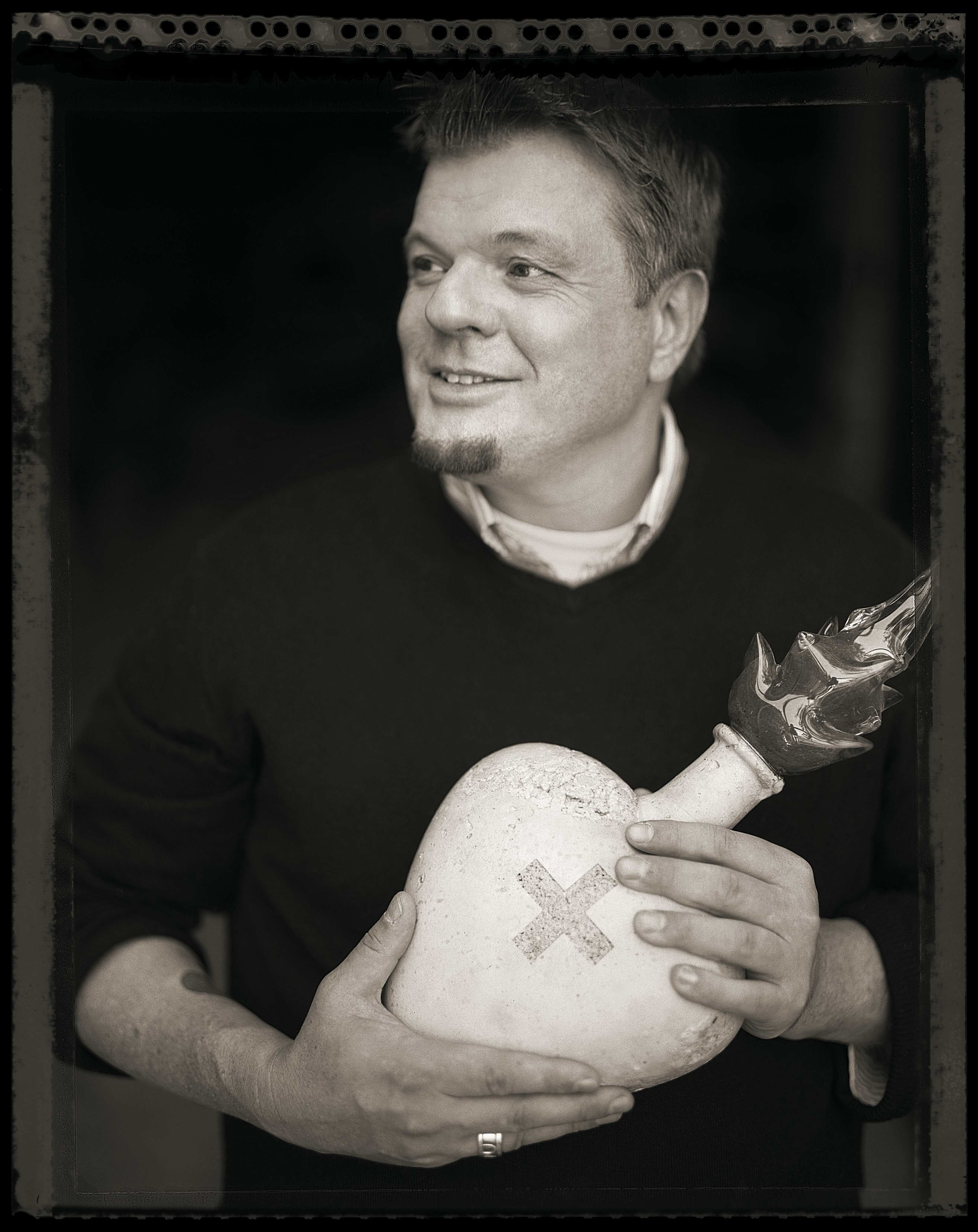
Tate, 2017

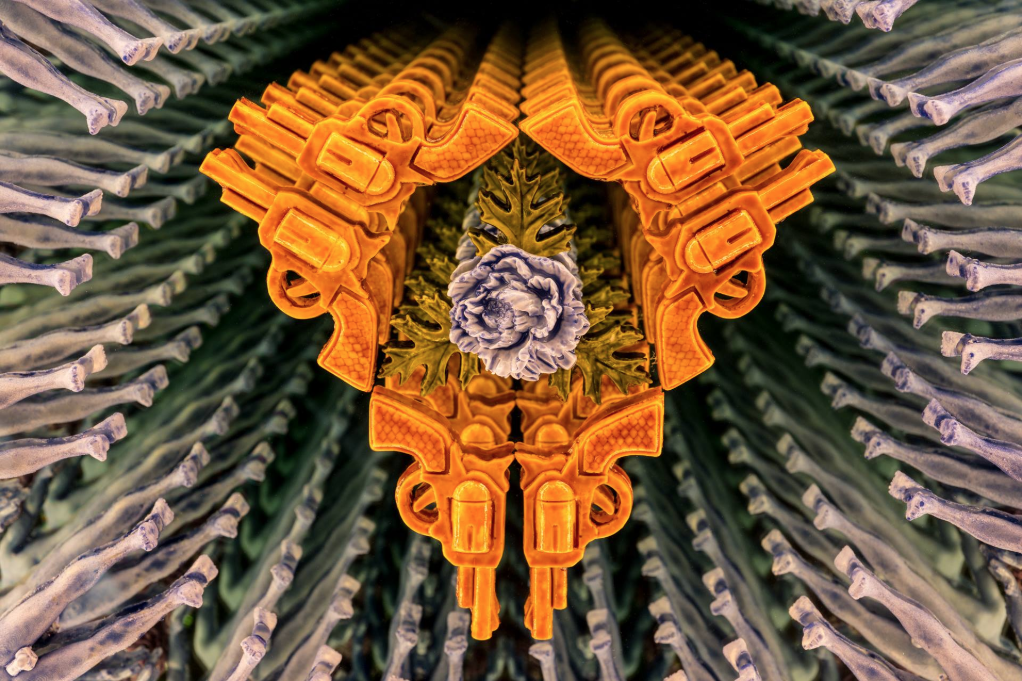
Detail of Tate's "Endless Cycle" (2017)

Tim Tate (born 1960) is an American artist and the co-founder of the Washington Glass School in the Greater Washington, DC capital area. The school was founded in 2001 and is now the second largest warm glass school in the United States. Tate was diagnosed as HIV positive in 1989 and was told that he had a year left to live. As a result, Tate decided to begin working with glass to leave a legacy behind. Over a decade ago, Tate began incorporating video and embedded electronics into his glass sculptures, thus becoming one of the first artists to migrate and integrate the relatively new form of video art into sculptural works. In 2019 he was selected to represent the United States at the sixth edition of the Glasstress exhibition at the Venice Biennale.

Tate was born and currently lives in Washington, D.C.

== Press ==
In her 2003 review of Tate's first solo gallery exhibition at the Fraser Gallery in Washington, DC, The Washington Times art critic Joanna Shaw-Eagle noted that visitors to the show "may not know exactly what draws them to Mr. Tate's art, but they'll find it mesmerizing. The more they examine it, the more they'll get back." In reviewing that same show, The Washington Post's art critic Michael O'Sullivan observed that Tate's symbolic vocabulary, at least to O'Sullivan, suggested the iconography of martyrdom. In the 2007 Artomatic show, Tate's artwork The Rapture disappeared under dramatic circumstances, and later a ransom demand (for Monopoly money) was sent to The Washington Post. The demands were met and parts of the artwork were returned by the thief, named "The Collector", along with his manifesto about society failing to value its art.

Four years later, the Philadelphia Free Press was one of the first to try to categorize his work as "steampunk", and they also affirmed that Tate was a sculptor, a videographer, and a glass artist. In discussing his ground-breaking incorporation of video to traditional glass art, The Washington City Paper documented in 2008 that Tate hoped that his incorporation of new media, running on computer-processing power, would yield a new approach to glass blowing. Also in 2008 The Philadelphia Inquirer reported that two of Tate's pieces sold for $41,000 at auction.

In 2009, the National Public Radio program All Things Considered put similar observations about his work in the context that the work occupied a "strange place between Old World art and New World technology."

In 2011, together with curator, art critic, and author William Warmus, Tate started a Facebook page devoted to "glass secessionism." "In a controversial move, the secessionists posited that a new generation was moving beyond the technical and aesthetic ideals of the 20th-century postwar studio glass movement." The backlash from the glass establishment was immediate; the new Facebook conversation was called uninformed and even mean-spirited. By 2014 Tate and Warmus had established themselves as the leaders of this new movement in contemporary glass.

By 2013, American University, even while describing his growing artistic presence as "Washington, DC’s best known contemporary glass artist", also noted that the video component of his work was being recognized independently of the glass genre.

In 2018, The Washington Post observed that his work "refers to LGBTQ dignity."

In 2019, The Fort Wayne Museum of Art, in discussing one of Tate's works, postulated that "As a result of Tate's modern interpretation, Degas representation of an "Opera Rat" is incorporated into the modern feminist narrative."

In 2021, Tate was part of the U.S. premiere of 'Glasstress', an international exhibition assembled by the Boca Raton Museum of Art. The exhibition presented 34 new works that "explore some of today’s pressing subjects, including human rights, climate change, racial justice, gender issues and politics", and included artists such as Ai Weiwei, Ugo Rondinone, Vik Muniz, Jake & Dinos Chapman, Thomas Schütte, and others. Also in 2021, Tate's work in The Phillips Collection exhibition Inside Outside, Upside Down was described by The Washington City Paper as an "homage to the plague during the reign of Byzantine Emperor Justinian, embodied through a gray 'mirror' filled with pained faces, suggesting Auguste Rodin’s 'The Gates of Hell' sculpture. Writing about the same work, The Washington Post art critic noted that:

"One of the most striking artworks in the Phillips Collection’s “Inside Outside, Upside Down” — a juried group exhibition of works by area artists — is a sort of mirror into history. Tim Tate’s “Justinian’s Oculus,” made of glasslike plastic, sets an ornate frame around a tightly packed cluster of 3-D faces and skulls, evoking the victims of a plague that wracked the Byzantine Empire. That was in the 6th century, but this sculpture — and the show that contains it — wouldn’t exist without the events of 2020."

== Awards ==
- In 2003 Tate was selected as the Washington, DC Outstanding Emerging Artist as part of the annual Mayor's Arts Awards.
- In 2008 Tate was awarded the Niche Award for Blown glass.
- In 2008 Tate was announced as the winner for the competition to design the International AIDS Monument in New Orleans, LA.
- In 2009 Tate was awarded the $35,000 Virginia A. Groot Foundation Award.
- Also in 2009, he received an award from the Museum of American Glass in New Jersey as one of the "Rising Stars of the 21st Century."
- In 2012 Tate was granted a Fulbright scholar Award and subsequently taught at the University of Sunderland in England in 2012.
- In 2017 Tate was the runner-up for the London Contemporary Art Prize.
- Multiple grants, fellowships and awards from the D.C. Commission on the Arts and Humanities, most recently in 2018.

== Collections ==
Tate's artwork is in the permanent collections of a number of museums, including the Smithsonian's American Art Museum in Washington, DC, the Mint Museum in Charlotte, NC, the Renwick Gallery in Washington, DC, the Fuller Craft Museum in Brockton, MA, The American University Katzen Art Museum in Washington, DC, the Milwaukee Art Museum, Vanderbilt University, University of Richmond Art Museum, and the University of Virginia Art Museum. His work is also in the permanent collection of Washington, DC.

== Major public art commissions ==
- Library of Congress – Historic Glass Doors
- Safeway – Large-scale architectural glass wall, Bethesda, Maryland
- Vanderbilt University – Glass Wall in Nursing Station, Memphis, Tennessee
- Prince George's County Courthouse, Cuppola Project, Upper Marlboro, Maryland
- Food And Friends Donor Wall – Washington, DC
- District Government Project – Wilson Building Public Art, Washington, DC
- Liberty Park at Liberty Center, Outdoor Sculpture Commission, Arlington, Virginia
- The Adele, Outdoor Sculpture Commission Silver Spring, Maryland
- US Environmental Protection Agency (EPA) Ariel Rios Building Courtyard, Outdoor Sculpture Commission, Washington, DC
- National Institute of Health (NIH) Sculpture Commission, Hatfield Clinic, Bethesda, Maryland
- Upper Marlboro Courthouse, Sculpture Commission, Prince George's County, Maryland
- American Physical Society / Baltimore Science Center, Sculpture Commission, Baltimore, Maryland
- The Residences of Rosedale, Outdoor Sculpture Commission, Bethesda, Maryland
- Holy Cross Hospital, Sculpture for Oncology Ward, Silver Spring, Maryland
- The Carmen Group, Sculpture Commission, Washington, DC
- New Orleans AIDS Monument, New Orleans, Louisiana
