= Joan Belmar =

American artist

Joan Belmar is a Chilean American artist (born 1970). He is a painter who uses a three dimensional technique using painting and collage processes with both painted and untreated Mylar/paper strips in circles and curvilinear shapes variations which then produced different and changes degrees of transparency, as light and the viewer move in relation to the work. He was a Washington, DC Mayor's Art Award Finalist in 2007 as an outstanding emerging artist. The DC Commission on the Arts & Humanities has also awarded him with an Artist Fellowship Program grant in 2009, and in 2011 he was awarded an Individual Artist Grant by the Arts and Humanities Council of Montgomery County, MD. He is a two-time recipient of the Maryland Arts Council Individual Artist Grant in Visual Arts: Painting, in 2010and 2013.

== Life and work ==
Belmar was born in Santiago, Chile, in December, 1970. He studied art at the Fundacion DUOC in Santiago, where he graduated with a degree in Graphic Design/Technical Drawing in 1993. A year later he left Chile and moved to Spain. In Spain he changed his birth name (John) to the Catalan version (Joan). Belmar then moved to the United States in 1999, settling in Washington, D.C.

In 2003, Belmar was granted permanent residency in the U.S. based on extraordinary artistic merit, and then became an American citizen in 2010.

Belmar's artwork is part of private and public collections, including the University of Maine Museum of Art's permanent collection and the official collection of Washington, DC. More recently, in 2016 he was awarded the First Place prize, from among 2240 received artworks, for Best Original Work in the Osten Biennial of Drawing in Macedonia.

Belmar has written about his recent work: "In my ongoing series of 3D works, paintings and drawings, I have become intrigued by maps, especially as I researched exterminated ethnic groups. In the maps, I encountered symbols, colors, drawings, grids, dots, and lines. Using these, I explore the psychological and cultural divisions that affect the different ways we see the world. The different qualities of the elements---the sometimes clash and contradictions of the materials---create a dialogue."

In 2018 Belmar moved to Poughkeepsie, New York, where he currently resides. He is represented by Adah Rose Gallery and Addison Ripley Fine Art in the Washington, DC area.

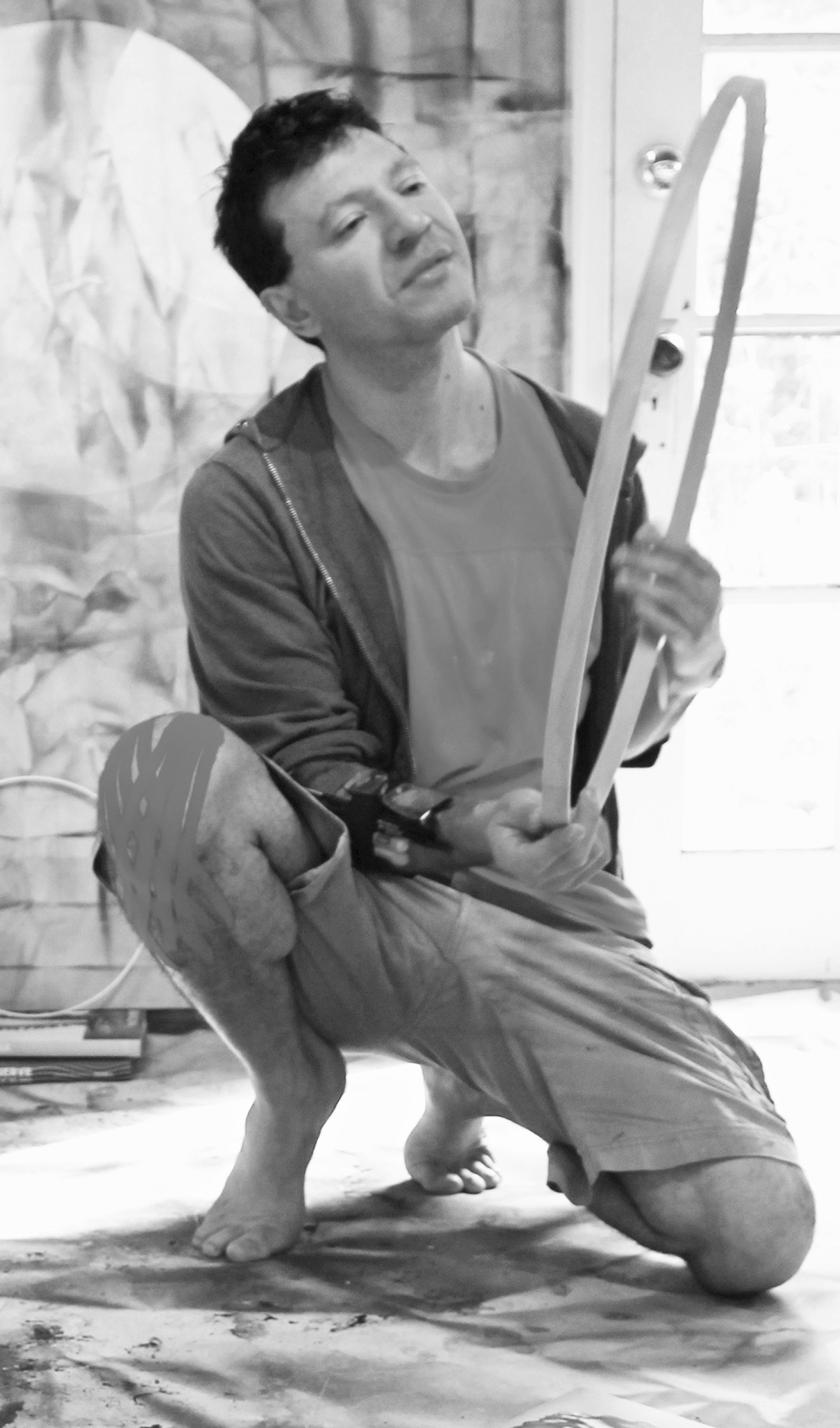
In his studio. Takoma Park. Maryland. Circa 2014

== Exhibitions and public collections ==
=== Solo shows ===
2019

University of Maine Museum of Art. Joan Belmar: "Way Stations". Bangor, ME

2018

Beguiled by Caravaggio, Adah Rose Gallery, Chevy Chase, MD

2018

Tangling Shadows, Rachel M. Schlesinger Concert Hall and Arts Center at Northern Virginia Community College’s Alexandria Campus, Virginia

2017

Cambalache. The Washington Post, Addison Ripley Fine Art, Washington, DC

2017

Émigré Artists, Charles Krause Reporting Fine Arts, Washington, DC

2017

Joan Belmar, Skopje, Macedonia

2014

CHORDS, Addison Ripley Fine Art, Washington, DC

2013

Trance-Lucid, Hillyer Art Space, Washington, DC

2012

Hidden Treasure, Charles Krause Reporting Fine Arts, Washington, DC

Time, Change, and Movement: The Art of Joan Belmar, Capital One, McLean, VA

2011

ONCE, Hillyer Art Space, Washington, DC

2008

Life’s Many Layers, H&F Fine Art, Mt. Rainier, MD

2007

Color Transparencies, Nevin Kelly Gallery, Washington, DC

2002

Illegal Alien, George Mason University, Fairfax, VA

2001

Life, Sae Gallery, Seoul, South Korea

2000

Asylum, Alex Gallery, Washington, DC

=== Selected group shows ===
2017

Twist – Layer – Pour: Sondra N. Arkin, Joan Belmar, and Mary Early, American University Art Museum, Washington, DC

The Language of Impressions, Ernst Community Cultural Center at NOVA Annandale, Annandale, VA

Oh Say, Can You See?, Charles Krause Reporting Fine Art, Washington, DC

Homage to Mango Street, Chautauqua Institution VACI, Chautauqua, NY

2016

The Looking Glass: Artist Immigrants of Washington, American University Art Museum, Washington, DC

What's the Big Idea?: Small Paintings from the Museum Collection, University of Maine Museum of Art, Bangor, ME

2015

Espaces de lumière, UNESCO, Paris, France

Espaces de lumière, Vilnius Town Hall, Vilnius, Lithuania

Art Miami New York Art Fair, Adah Rose Gallery, Pier 94, New York, NY

2014

Without Boundaries, School 33, Baltimore, MD

Washington Color Abstraction, The Gabarron Foundation, New York, NY

Paper Please!, Pentimenti Gallery, Philadelphia, PA

Art Market Hamptons, Pentimenti Gallery, Hamptons, NY

INMERSION, Fundacion Iturria, TTTR, Montevideo, Uruguay

2013

Le Temps de l’Eau, Wichita Falls Museum of Art, Wichita Falls, TX

Dallas Art Fair, Adah Rose Gallery, Dallas, TX

Bethesda Painting Award, Finalists Exhibition, Bethesda, MD

2012

Le Temps De L’eau, Musee de Tapisseries, Aix-en-Provence, France

First Impressions, Stevenson University, Baltimore MD

2011

Water: Take me to the River, The Art Gallery at the University of Maryland, College Park, MD

2010

WPA CATALYST, American University Art Museum, Washington, DC

Cultural Crossroads: Voices of Latin America and the Caribbean, Gateway Art Center, Brentwood, MD

2009

Obama: Art & Politics, H&F Fine Art, Mt. Rainier, MD

2008

DCCAH Fellowship Grant Exhibition, American University Museum, Washington, DC

The Story of Creation II, United Creators, New York, Munich, Frankfurt and Istanbul

2007

XVIII Ibero-American Art Salon, Mexican Cultural Institute, Washington, DC

2006

Heart of DC, City Hall Permanent Art Collection, The John Wilson Building, Washington, DC

Group Exhibition, Walter Wickiser Gallery, New York, NY

Mother, Anne C. Fisher Gallery, Washington, DC

=== Public collections ===
University of Maine Museum of Art, Bangor, ME

Fidelity Investment Art Collection, Boston, MA

The John A. Wilson Building, City Hall Art Collection. Washington, DC

Microsoft Corporation Art Collection, Redmond, WA

Stevenson University, Stevenson, MD

US Embassy Manila, The Philippines

Capital One Art Collection, McLean, VA

THE ARTERY CAPITAL GROUP, Chevy Chase, MD

Exelon Corporation, Baltimore, MD

Osten Art Collection. North Macedonia

Hogan Lovells Art Collection, Tysons, VA

US Embassy, Guatemala City, Guatemala (Chief of Mission residence)
