= American University Museum =

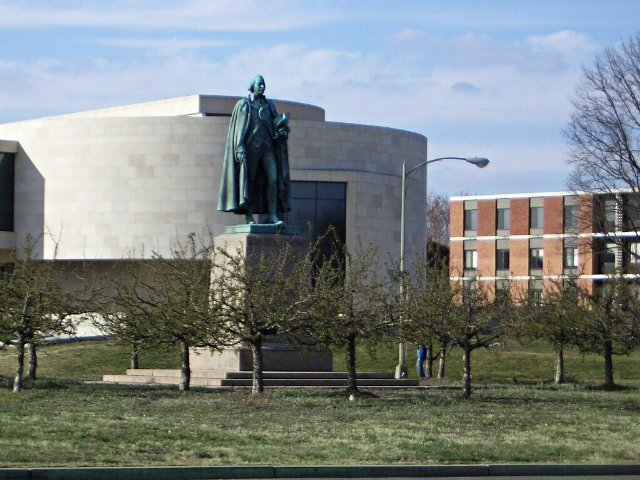

- Location within Washington, D.C.
- Established: 2005
- Location: 4400 Massachusetts Avenue NW Washington, DC 20016
- Coordinates: 38.9393°N 77.087°W
- Type: Art museum
- Director: Jack Rasmussen
- Public transit access: Tenleytown–AU
- Website: http://www.american.edu/museum

The American University Museum is located within the Katzen Arts Center at the American University in Washington, DC.

== History and description ==
The American University Museum consists of a three-story, 30,000-square-foot (2,800 m^{2}) museum and sculpture garden. The region’s largest university facility for exhibiting art, the museum’s permanent collection highlights the holdings of the Katzen and Watkins collections. Rotating exhibitions emphasize regional, national, and international contemporary art.

== Permanent collections ==
The Katzen Collection is a private collection donated to the university by Dr. Cyrus and Myrtle Katzen in 2005. The collection includes more than 300 paintings, prints, drawings, and sculptures, focusing on Pop Art, Washington art, and glass sculpture. It also contains three large bronze sculptures by Nancy Graves.

The Watkins Collection included more than 4500 works of art, with an emphasis on art produced in the Washington area since the 1940s. The collection was created in 1945 as a memorial to C. Law Watkins, the former chair of the Department of Art at American University. Originally only 25 works, it has been augmented by later donations.

The Corcoran Legacy Collection includes more than 9,000 works of art from the Corcoran Gallery of Art and includes works by Titian, Ansel Adams, Andy Warhol, Albrecht Dürer, Helen Frankenthaler and the Washington Color School.

== Rotating exhibitions ==
Jack Rasmussen, the museum's curator, focuses on rotating exhibitions that emphasize regional, national, international, and contemporary art and artists. The Museum's Kunsthalle style planning ensures constantly changing exhibitions on all three levels of the museum, often with highly relevant, political, and sometimes provocative programming that mirrors Washington, D.C. itself. Approximately 24 exhibitions are mounted annually across the museum's 44,000 square foot space.

In 2006 the museum presented “Contemporary North Korean Art: The Evolution of Socialist Realism,” the first ever exhibition of North Korea political realism artwork ever showcased in the United States. In 2017, the museum presented "Between Two Rounds of Fire, the Exile of the Sea", an Arab modernism exhibition in collaboration with the Barjeel Art Foundation on themes of war from eight different Arab countries and territories.

Via the Alper Initiative for Washington Art, the museum also focuses exhibitions on Washington, DC area artists, and is dedicated to preserving, presenting, and creating the art history of Washington through a book collection, database, events, and exhibitions. The Alper Initiative for Washington Art was made possible through a major financial grant by American University alumna and art advocate Carolyn Small Alper. In 2016 the initiative sponsored a widely acclaimed exhibition titled The Looking Glass: Artist Immigrants of Washington, which was curated by Rasmussen to showcase the immigration stories, experiences, and views of ten Washington, DC area artists - all of whom were immigrants to the United States from Latin America.

The Alper Initiative for Washington Art includes:

- 5 new exhibitions submitted by Washington-area artists each year
- 2,000 square feet of gallery space in the museum
- 60+ books on the Washington, DC area art history

== Related links ==
- American University Museum
- Erica Jong, Review: "Botero Sees the World's True Heavies at Abu Ghraib", Washington Post, 4 Nov 2007
