= List of Latin American artists =

A list of notable Latin American visual artists (painters, sculptors, photographers, video artists, etc.), arranged by nationality:

== Argentina ==
- Roberto Aizenberg (1928–1996)
- Antonio Alice (1886–1943)
- Antonio Berni (1905–1981)
- Delia Cancela (born 1940)
- Graciela Carnevale (born 1942)
- Elda Cerrato (born 1930–2023)
- Alicia Creus (born 1939)
- José Cuneo (born 1965)
- León Ferrari (1920–2013)
- Lucio Fontana (1899–1968)
- Alfredo Guttero (1882–1932)
- Esteban Lisa (1895–1983)
- Cándido López (1840–1902)
- Rebeca Mendoza (born 1967)
- Florencio Molina Campos (1891–1959)
- Marta Minujín (born 1944)
- Marcelo Pombo (born 1959)
- Liliana Porter (born 1941)
- Alfredo Prior (born 1952)
- Benito Quinquela Martín (1890–1977)
- Xul Solar (1887–1963)
- Raúl Soldi (1905–1994)
- Manuel Zorrilla (1919–2015)
- Grete Stern (1904–1999)
- Roberto Jacoby (born 1944)
- Bibi Zogbé (1890–1973)

== Bolivia ==
- Rodolfo Ayoroa (1927–2003), painter, printmaker, sculptor
- María Esther Ballivián (1927–1977), painter, engraver
- Roberto Berdecio (1910–1996), muralist, painter, printmaker
- Gonzalo Condarco, sculptor
- Inés Córdova (1927–2010), painter, potter
- Alfredo Da Silva (1935–2020), painter and photographer
- Alejandra Dorado (born 1969), installation and performance artist
- Sonia Falcone (born 1965), painter
- Graciela Rodo Boulanger (born 1935), painter and printmaker
- Roberto Mamani Mamani, painter
- Master of Calamarca (early 18th century), painter
- Benjamín Mendoza y Amor Flores (1933-2004), painter
- Marina Núñez del Prado (c. 1910–1995), sculptor
- María Luisa Pacheco (1919–1982), painter and illustrator
- Cecilio Guzmán de Rojas (1899–1950), painter
- Francisco Tito Yupanqui (1550–1616), sculptor
- Gastón Ugalde (born 1946)
- Rosmery Mamani Ventura (born 1985), painter
- Alejandro Mario Yllanes (1913–1960), painter and printmaker

== Brazil ==
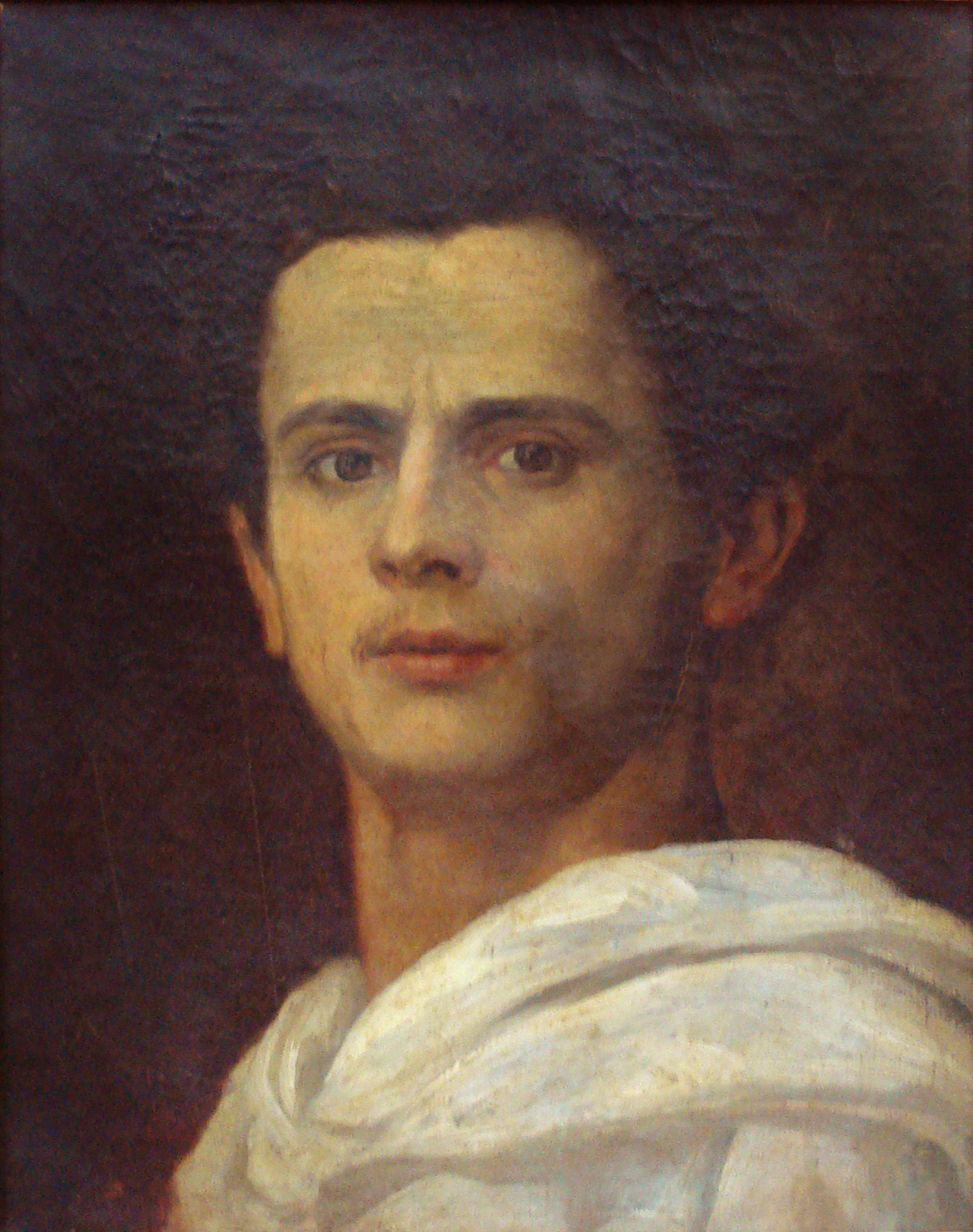
Self-portrait by Almeida Júnior (1878)

- Aleijadinho (1730–1814)
- Tarsila do Amaral (1886–1973)
- Artur Barrio (born 1945)
- Lenora de Barros (born 1953)
- Di Cavalcanti (1897–1976)
- Amílcar de Castro (1920–2002)
- Lygia Clark (1920–1988)
- Oswaldo Goeldi (1895–1961)
- Anna Maria Maiolino (born 1942)
- Anita Malfatti (1889–1964)
- Cildo Meireles (born 1948)
- Vik Muniz (born 1961)
- Hélio Oiticica (1937–1980)
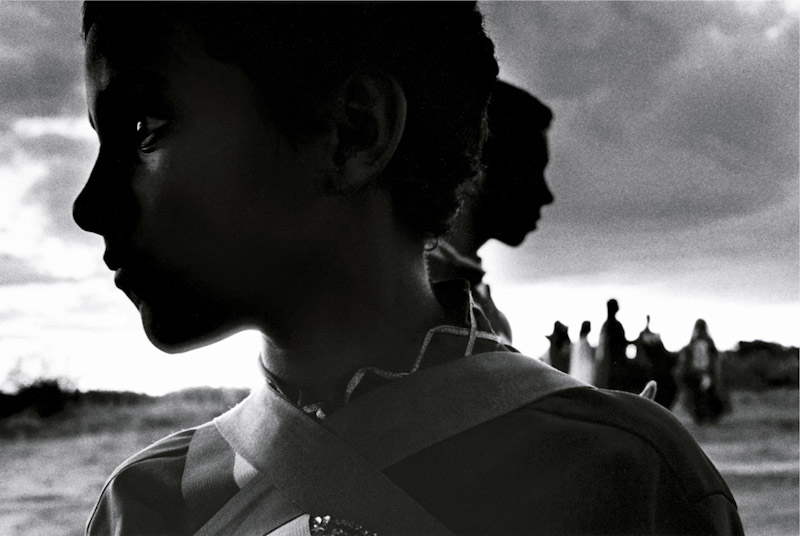
  “Janus”. Religious society "Vale do Amanhecer", Brazil, 2004. Photo: Guy Veloso, gelatin silver print.
- Almeida Júnior (1850–1899)
- Naza (born 1955)
- Ismael Nery (1900–1934)
- Lygia Pape (1927–2004)
- Wanda Pimentel (1943–2015)
- Cândido Portinari (1903–1962)
- Lasar Segall (1891–1957)
- Teresinha Soares (born 1927)
- Amelia Toledo (1926–2017)
- Adriana Varejão (born 1964)
- Cybèle Varela (born 1943)
- Guy Veloso (born 1969)
- Alfredo Volpi (1896–1988)
- Márcia X (1959–2005)

== Chicano ==
- Lalo Alcaraz (born 1964)
- Carlos Almaraz (1941–1989)
- Cecilia Alvarez (born 1950)
- Miguel Angel Reyes (born 1964)
- Alfonso Arana (1927–2005)
- Gus Arriola (1917–2008)
- John August Swanson (1938–2021)
- Judy Baca (born 1946)
- Enrique Chagoya (born 1953), printmaker, painter
- Jerry De La Cruz (born 1948)
- Roberto de la Rocha
- Richard Dominguez (born 1960)
- Edgar de Evia (1910–2003)
- Elsa Flores (born 1955)
- Harry Gamboa, Jr. (born 1951)
- David Gonzales (cartoonist) (born 1964)
- Robert Graham (sculptor) (1938–2008)
- Manuel Gregorio Acosta (1921–1989)
- Gronk (born 1957)
- Ester Hernandez (born 1944)
- Gilbert Hernandez (born 1957)
- Jaime Hernandez (born 1959)
- Javier Hernandez (born 1966)
- Mario Hernandez (born 1953)
- Yolanda Lopez (1942–2021)
- Gilbert Luján (1940–2011)
- Xavier Martínez (1859–1943)
- Alberto Mijangos (1925–2007)
- Laura Molina (born 1957)
- Rafael Navarro (born 1967)
- Manuel Neri (1930–2021)
- Rafael Vargas-Suarez (born 1972)
- Mark Vallen (born 1953)
- Emigdio Vasquez (1939–2014)
- Jhonen Vasquez (born 1974)
- Esteban Villa (1930–2022)

== Chile ==
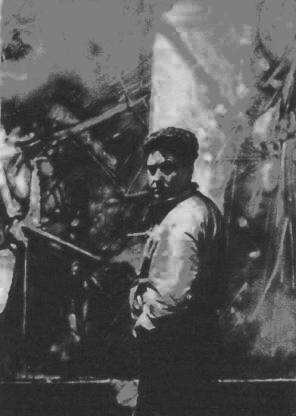
Roberto Matta, Chile

- Joan Belmar
- Carlos Catasse (1944–2010)
- Santos Chávez (1934–2001), printmaker
- Marta Colvin (1907–1995)
- Eugenio Cruz Vargas (1923–2014)
- Juan Davila
- Guillermo Deisler (1940–1995)
- Marcela Donoso (born 1961)
- Freddy Flores Knistoff (born 1948)
- Alfredo Jaar (born 1956)
- LasTesis
- Pedro Lira (1845–1912)
- Roberto Matta (1911–2002)
- Gordon Matta-Clark (1943–1978), Chilean-American
- Camilo Mori (1896–1973)
- José Manuel Ramírez Rosales (1804–1877)
- Thomas Somerscales (1842–1927)
- Catalina Parra (born 1940), political/feminist conceptual artist

== Colombia ==
- Julio Abril (1912–1979)
- Liliana Angulo Cortés (born 1974)
- Débora Arango (1907–2005)
- Fernando Botero (1932–2023)
- Antonio Caro (1950–2021)
- Juan Fernando Cobo (born 1959)
- Danilo Dueñas (born 1956)
- Miguel de la Espriella "Noble" (born 1947)
- Carlos Jacanamijoy (born 1964), Painter
- Ignacio Gómez Jaramillo
- Beatriz González (born 1938)
- Enrique Grau (1920–2004)
- Nereo López (1920-2015), Photographer
- Santiago Martínez Delgado (1906–1954)
- Oscar Murillo (born 1986)
- Édgar Negret (1920–2012)
- Alejandro Obregón (1920–1992)
- Omar Rayo (1928–2010)
- Bernardo Ríos (born 1959)
- Pedro Restrepo
- Doris Salcedo (born 1958)

== Cuba ==
- Jose Acosta Hernandez (born 1966)
- José Braulio Bedia Valdés (born 1959)
- José Bernal (1925–2010)
- F. Lennox Campello (born 1956)
- María Magdalena Campos Pons (born 1959)
- Yoan Capote
- Manuel Carbonell (1917–2011)
- Pedro Álvarez Castelló (1967–2004)
- Humberto Jesús Castro García (born 1957)
- Rafael Consuegra (1941–2021)
- Felipe Dulzaides
- Carlos Enríquez (1900–1957)
- Roberto Fabelo (born 1951)
- Agustín Fernández (1928–2006)
- Teresita Fernández
- Miguel Fleitas (born 1956)
- Coco Fusco (born 1960)
- Lourdes Gomez Franca (1933–2017)
- Félix González-Torres (1957–1996)
- Nestor Hernandez (1961–2006)
- Carmen Herrera (born 1915)
- Miguel Jorge (1928–1984)
- Josignacio (born 1963)
- Alberto Korda, photographer
- Kcho (born 1970)
- Wifredo Lam (1902–1982)
- Los Carpinteros
- Ana Mendieta (1948–1985)
- Rene Mederos (1933–1996)
- Adriano Nicot (born 1964)
- Amelia Peláez (1896–1968)
- Marta María Pérez Bravo (born 1969)
- Dionisio Perkins (1929–2015)
- Carlos Enrique Prado Herrera (born 1978)
- Wilfredo Prieto
- Sandra Ramos (born 1969)
- Miguel Rodez (born 1956)
- Emilio Hector Rodriguez (born 1950)
- Baruj Salinas (born 1935)
- Lolo Soldevilla (1901-1971)
- Juan T. Vázquez Martín (1941–2017)

== Dominican Republic ==
- Cándido Bidó (1936–2011)
- Jaime Colson (1901–1975)
- Celeste Woss y Gil (1891–1985)
- Yoryi Morel (1906–1979)
- Paul Giudicelli
- Delia Weber (1900–1982)
- Tito Canepa (1916–2014)
- Olivia Peguero
- Ada Balcácer (born 1930)
- Rigo Peralta
- Guillo Pérez (1923–2014)
- Amaya Salazar (born 1951)
- Darío Suro (1917–1997)
- Rosa Tavarez (1939–2023)
- Eligio Pichardo (1929–1984)
- Clara Ledesma (1924–1999)
- Gilberto Hernández Ortega (1923–1979)
- Raquel Paiewonsky (born 1969)
- Edward Telleria (born 1974)
- Alberto Ulloa (1950–2011)
- Oscar Abreu (born 1978)

== Ecuador ==
- Aníbal Villacís (1927–2012)
- Araceli Gilbert (1913–1993)
- Caesar Andrade Faini (1913–1995)
- Camilo Egas (1889–1962)
- Eduardo Kingman (1913–1998)
- Efraín Andrade Viteri (1920–1997)
- Enrique Gomezjurado (1891–1978)
- Enrique Tábara (1930–2021)
- Estuardo Maldonado (born 1930)
- Félix Aráuz (1935–2024)
- Gonzalo Amancha (born 1948)
- Gonzalo Endara Crow (1936–1996)
- Hugo Cifuentes (photographer)
- Jorge Velarde (born 1960)
- José Carreño (born 1947)
- Juan Villafuerte (1945–1977)
- Judith Gutiérrez (1927–2003)
- Luis Miranda (1932–2016)
- Luis Molinari-Flores (1929–1994)
- Manuel Rendón (1894–1992)
- Marcos Restrepo (born 1961)
- Miguel Betancourt (born 1958)
- Oswaldo Guayasamín (1919–1999)
- Oswaldo Moncayo (1923–1984)
- Oswaldo Viteri (1931–2023)
- Ramón Piaguaje (born 1962)
- Theo Constanté (1934–2014)
- Xavier Blum Pinto (born 1957)

== El Salvador ==
- Noe Canjura (1922–1970)
- Beatriz Cortez
- Giovanni Gil (born 1971), engraver (printmaker), painter and watercolorist
- Salarrué (Salvador Salazar Arrué)
- Nicolas F. Shi, painter

== Guatemala ==
- Rodolfo Abularach (1933–2020), painter, printmaker
- Ricardo Almendáriz (fl. 1787), draftsman
- José Luis Álvarez (1919–2012), painter
- Margarita Azurdia (1931–1998), sculptor, painter
- Andrés Curruchich (1891–1969), painter
- Darío Escobar (born 1971), sculptor
- Regina José Galindo
- Jessica Kairé (born 1980), sculptor, installation artist
- Alfred Julio Jensen (1903–1981), abstract painter
- Jorge de León (born 1976), performance artist
- Aníbal López (born 1964), painter, performance artist, photography, videographer
- Carlos Mérida (1891–1984)
- Rafael Rodríguez Padilla (1890–1929), painter, printmaker, sculptor
- Carlos Mauricio Valenti Perrillat (1888–1912), painter
- Rafael Yela Günther (1888–1942), painter, sculptor
- Efraín Recinos (1928–2011), painter, sculptor, architect

== Mexico ==
- Raúl Anguiano
- Ignacio Barrios, watercolorist
- Luis Barragán, architect
- Arnold Belkin
- Lizet Benrey, painter
- Maris Bustamante (born 1949)
- Miguel Cabrera (1695–1768), painter
- Leonora Carrington (1917–2011)
- Miguel Condé (born 1939)
- Roberto Cortázar (born 1962)
- Rodolfo Escalera (1929–2000)
- Julio Galán (1958–2006)
- Gunther Gerzso (1915–2000)
- Guillermo Gómez-Peña (born 1955)
- Graciela Iturbide, photographer
- Frida Kahlo (1907–1954)
- Guillermo Kahlo, photographer
- Myra Landau (1926–2018)
- Rafael Lozano-Hemmer
- Teresa Margolles (born 1963)
- Tina Modotti, photographer (1896–1942)
- Pablo O'Higgins
- José Clemente Orozco (1883–1949)
- Gabriel Orozco (born 1962)
- José Guadalupe Posada
- Diego Rivera (1886–1957)
- Verónica Ruiz de Velasco (born 1968)
- David Alfaro Siqueiros (1896–1974)
- Rufino Tamayo (1899–1991)
- Francisco Toledo (1940–2019)
- José María Velasco Gómez (1840–1912)

== Nicaragua ==
- Pablo Antonio Cuadra, graphic artist
- Omar D'León, painter
- Franck de Las Mercedes, artist
- Armando Morales, painter
- Hugo Palma-Ibarra, painter
- Gabriel Traversari, painter
- Julio Valle Castillo, painter
- Ernesto Cardenal, poet

== Panama ==
- Carlos Francisco Chang Marín (1922–2012), writer
- Chafil Cheucarama, Wounaan painter, carver, and illustrator
- Guillermo Trujillo (1927–2018), painter
- José Luis Rodríguez Pittí (born 1971), writer, photographer
- Marco Ernesto (1923–1985)
- Antonio Jose Guzman
- Alfredo Sinclair (1914–2014), painter
- Olga Sinclair, painter
- Rosa María Britton, artist, writer

== Peru ==
- Pablo Amaringo
- Teresa Burga
- Martín Chambi, photographer
- Alberto Dávila
- Victor Delfín
- Fernando De Szyszlo
- Gloria Gómez-Sánchez
- Johanna Hamann
- Daniel Hernández (painter)
- Hugo Orellana Bonilla
- Harry Roldán Pinedo Valera (born 1988)
- Carlos Enrique Polanco
- Diego Quispe Tito
- Susana Raab
- José Sabogal
- Josué Sánchez
- Basilio Santa Cruz Pumacallao (1635–1710), painter
- Victoria Santa Cruz
- Fernando de Szyszlo
- Elena Tejada-Herrera
- Mario Testino, photographer
- Tilsa Tsuchiya
- Mario Urteaga Alvarado
- Boris Vallejo
- Alberto Vargas
- Jorge Vinatea Reinoso
- Marcos Zapata or Marcos Sapaca Inca (c. 1710–1773), painter

== Puerto Rico ==
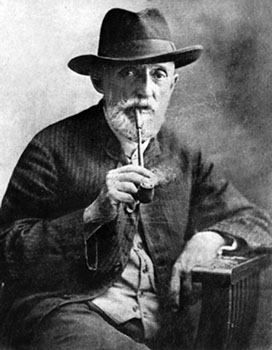
Francisco Oller

- Olga Albizu (1924–2005)
- Allora & Calzadilla contemporary art duo
- Alfonso Arana (1927–2005)
- Ramón Atiles y Pérez (1804–1875)
- Myrna Báez (1931–2018)
- José Campeche (1751–1809)
- Daniel Lind-Ramos (born 1953)
- Pablo Marcano García (born 1952)
- Poli Marichal (born 1956)
- Soraida Martinez (born 1956)
- María de Mater O'Neill (born 1960)
- Frieda Medín (born 1949)
- Francisco Oller (1833–1917)
- Sandra Perez-Ramos
- Arnaldo Roche Rabell (1955–2018)
- Juan Sanchez (born 1954)
- Joe Shannon (born 1933)
- Alessandra Torres (born 1980)

== Uruguay ==
- Zoma Baitler (1908–1994)
- Rafael Barradas (1890–1929)
- Eduardo Barreto
- Juan Manuel Blanes (1830–1901)
- Carlos Capelán (born 1948)
- José Cuneo Perinetti (1887–1977)
- Eladio Dieste (1917–2000)
- Pedro Figari (1861–1938)
- Haroldo González (born 1941)
- José Gurvich (1927–1974)
- Carlos María Herrera (1875–1914)
- Carlos Páez Vilaró (1923–2014)
- Virginia Patrone (born 1950)
- Daniel Pontet (born 1957)
- Nelbia Romero (1938–2015)
- Martín Sastre (born 1976)
- Joaquín Torres García (1874–1949)
- Teresa Trujillo (born 1937)
- Petrona Viera (1895–1960)
- José Luis Zorrilla de San Martín (1891–1975)

== Venezuela ==
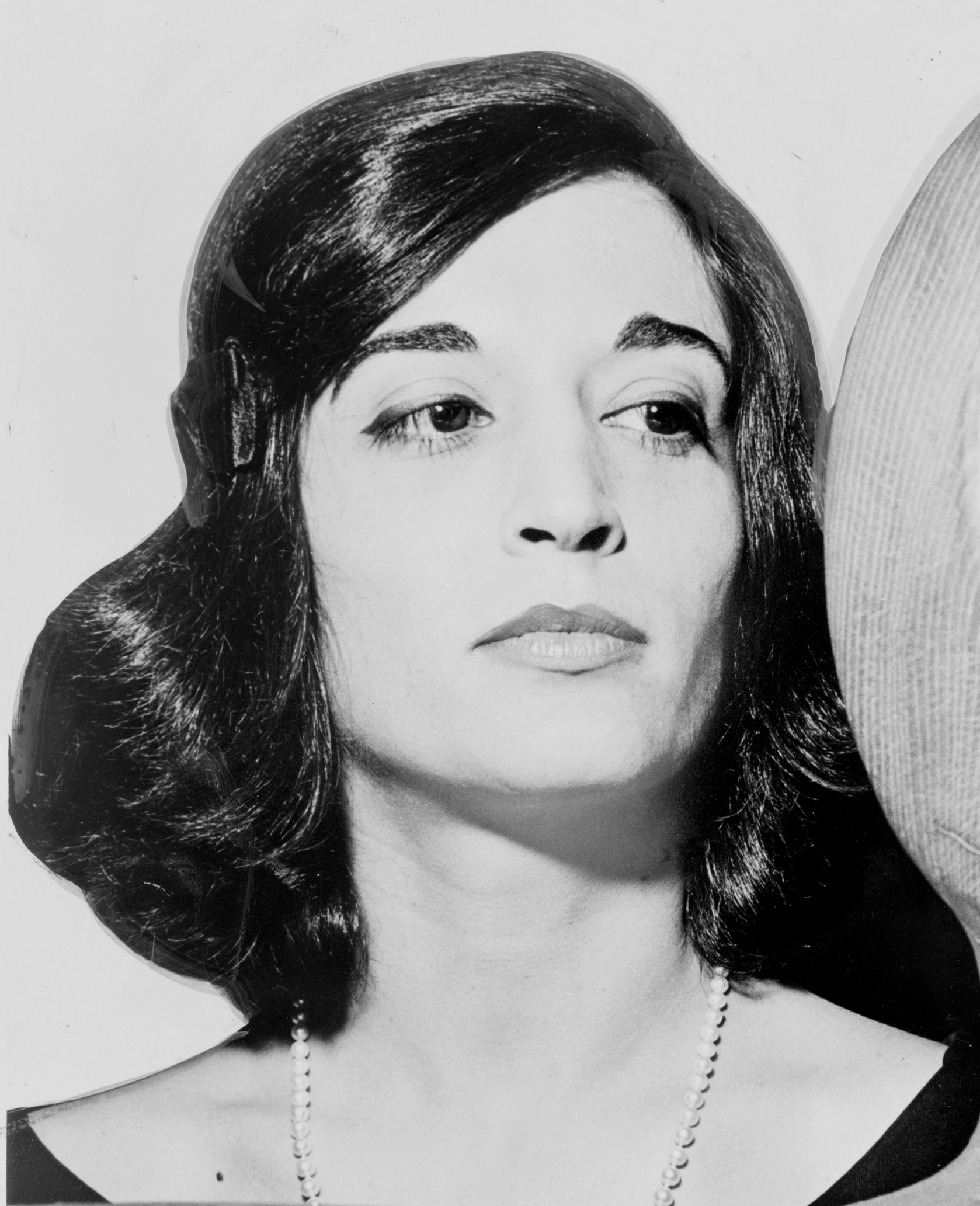
Marisol Escobar, sculptor, Venezuela

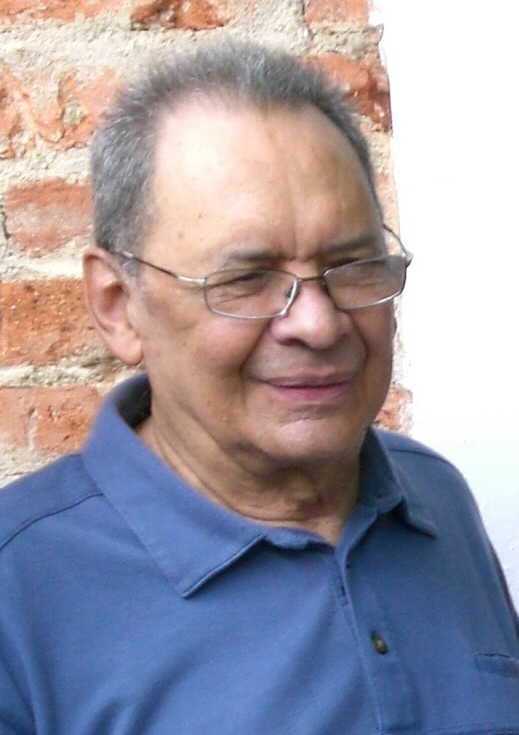
Pedro León Zapata, cartoonist, muralist, painter, Venezuela

=== 19th century Venezuelan artists (chronological order) ===
- Carmelo Fernández (1809–1897), artist and painter
- Martín Tovar y Tovar (1827–1902), artist and painter
- Eloy Palacios (1847–1919), artist, sculptor and painter
- Emilio Boggio (1857–1920) painter
- Cristóbal Rojas (1857–1890)
- Arturo Michelena (1863–1898), painter

=== 20th century Venezuelan artists (chronological order) ===
- Federico Brandt (1878–1932), painter
- Armando Reverón (1889–1954), painter
- Manuel Cabré (1890–1984), painter
- Juan Félix Sánchez (1900–1997), folk artist in weaving and sculpture
- Francisco Narváez (1905–1982), sculptor
- Gertrude Goldschmidt (1912–1994), a.k.a. "Gego"
- César Rengifo (1915–1980)
- Gabriel Bracho (1915–1995)
- Braulio Salazar (1917–2008)
- Mario Abreu (1919–1993)
- Alejandro Otero (1921–1990)
- Jesús Soto (1923–2005)
- Oswaldo Vigas (1923–2014)
- Carlos Cruz-Díez (1923–2019)
- Elsa Gramcko (1925–1994)
- Pedro León Zapata (1928–2015), artist, humorist and cartoonist
- Mariano Díaz (photographer) (born 1929), journalist, photographer, designer, writer
- Lía Bermúdez (1930–2021)
- Marisol Escobar (1930–2016), sculptor
- Jacobo Borges (born 1931), neo-figurative artist
- Juan Calzadilla (born 1931), poet, painter and art critic
- Julio Maragall (born 1936), sculptor
- Harry Abend (1937–2021)
- Balthazar Armas (1941–2015), contemporary and abstract movement painter
- Paul del Rio (1943–2015), sculptor and painter
- Jorge Blanco (born 1945), artist, sculptor, graphic designer, illustrator and humorist
- Patricia van Dalen (born 1955)
- Arturo Herrera (born 1959)

=== Contemporary Venezuelan artists (chronological order) ===
- María Rivas (1960–2019), Latin jazz singer, composer, and occasional painter
- Julio Aguilera (born 1961), painter and sculptor
- Carla Arocha (born 1961)
- José Antonio Hernández-Díez (born 1964)
- Deborah Castillo (born 1971)
- Jaime Gili (born 1972)
- Hermann Mejia (born 1973), illustrator, painter and sculptor
- Yucef Merhi (born 1977)

== See also ==
- Latin American art
- List of indigenous artists of the Americas
- List of Latin American writers
