= Photography in Colombia =

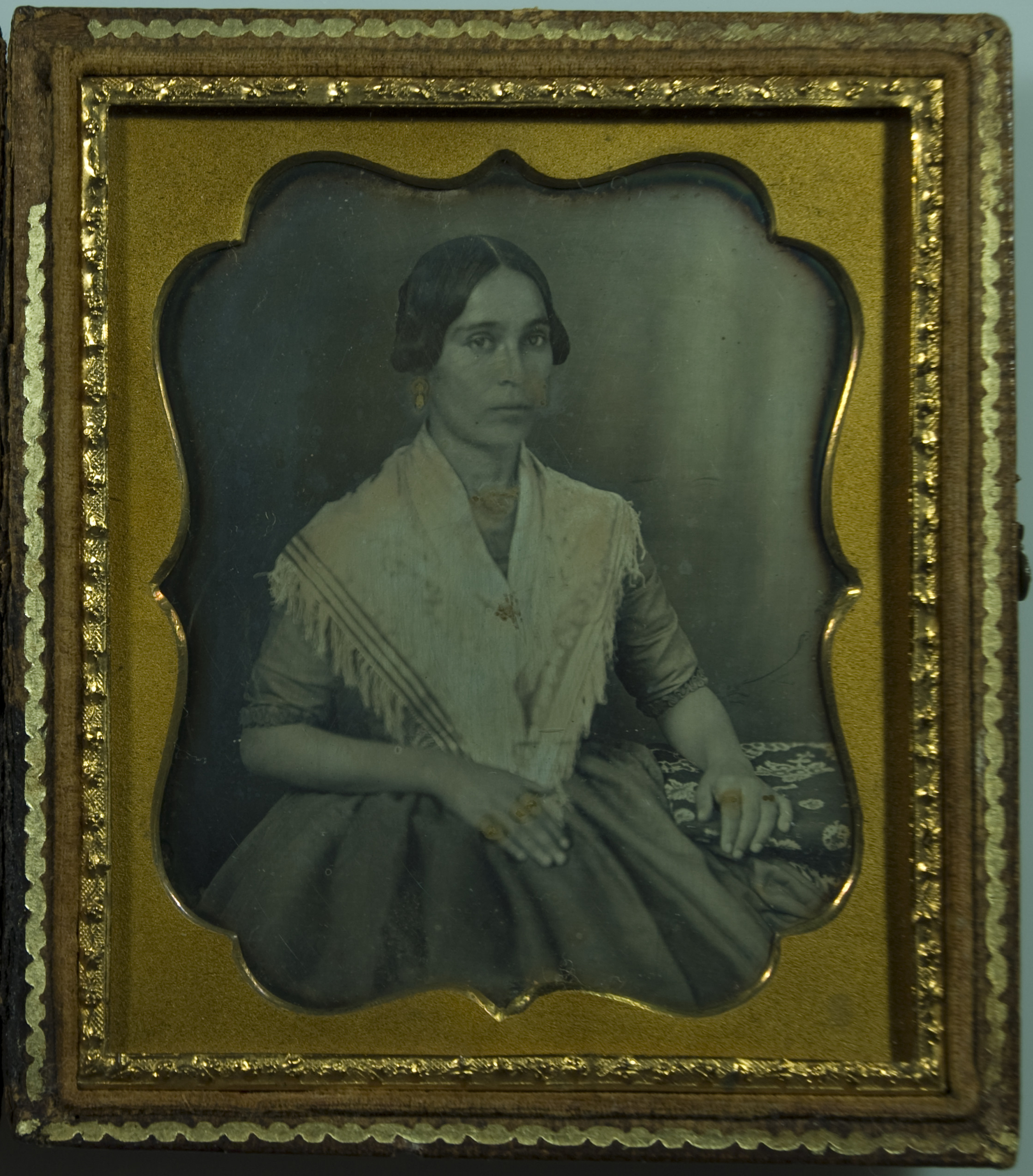
Daguerreotype portrait of Lucrecia Guerrero Uribe, 1848. Author: Fermín Isaza.

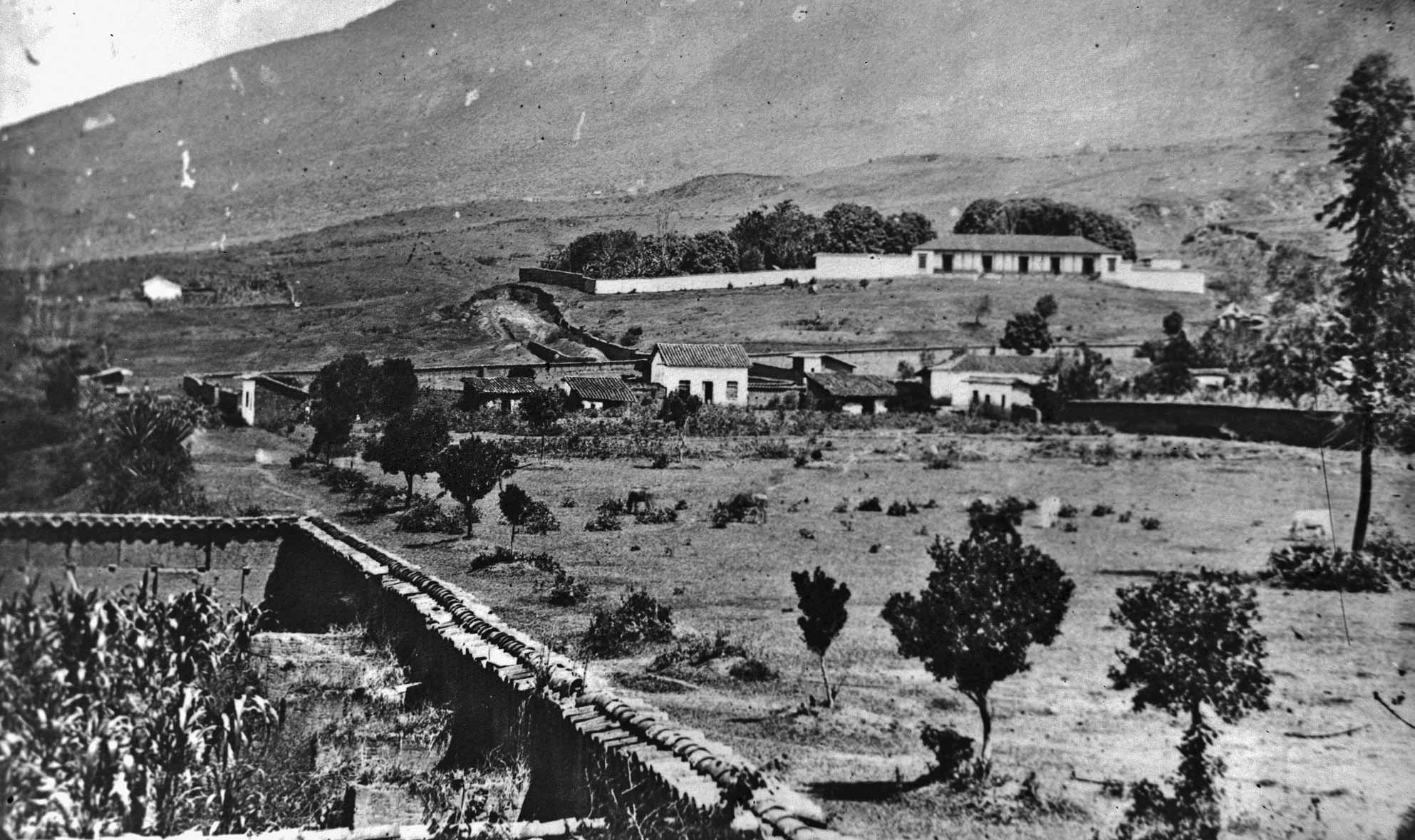
Villanueva, Medellín, 1875, photograph by Pastor Restrepo.

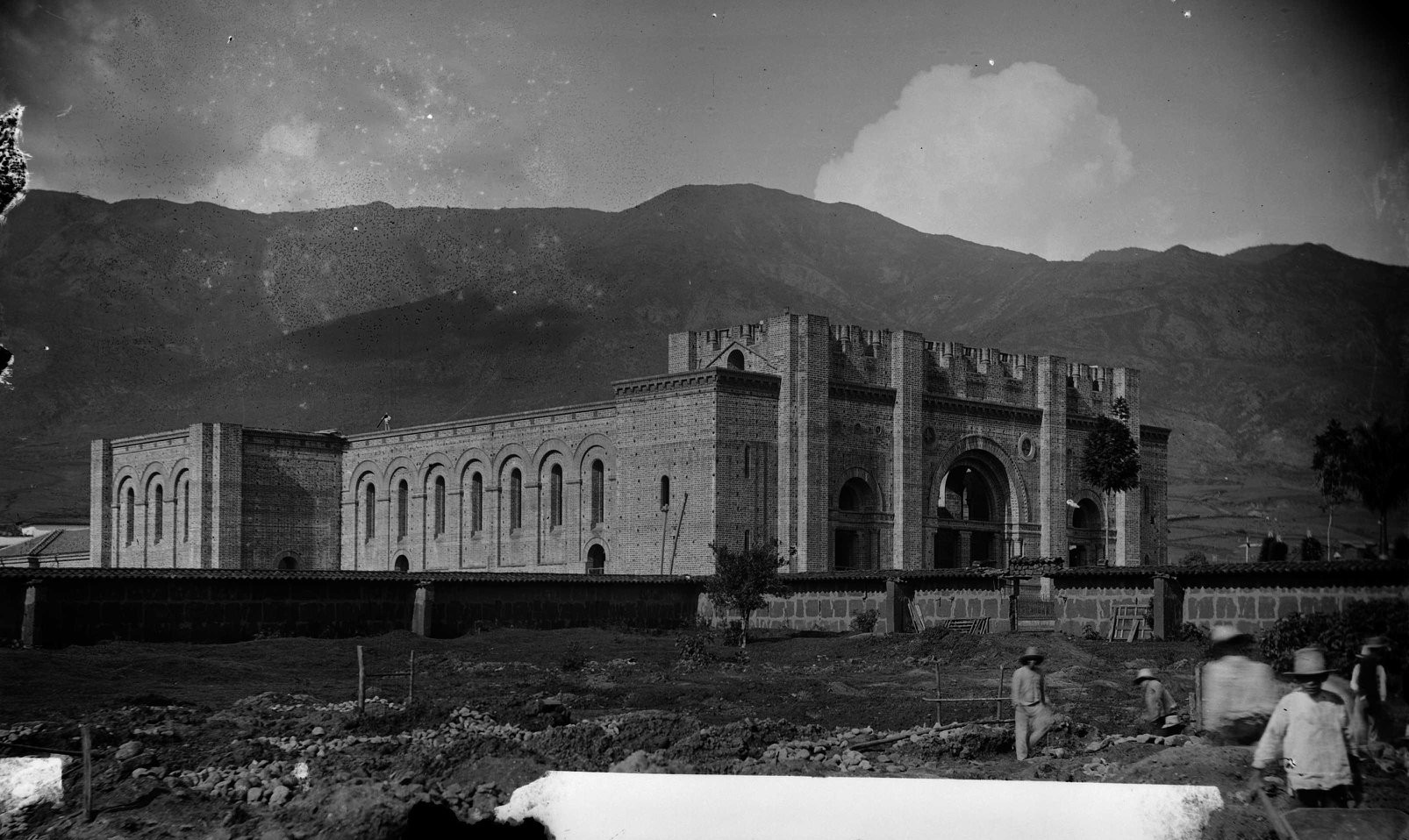
Construction of the Cathedral of Medellín, 1892, photograph by Melitón Rodríguez.

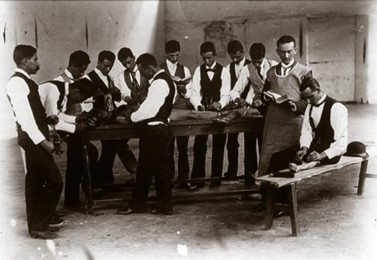
Anatomy class at the University of Antioquia, 1896, photograph by Melitón Rodríguez.

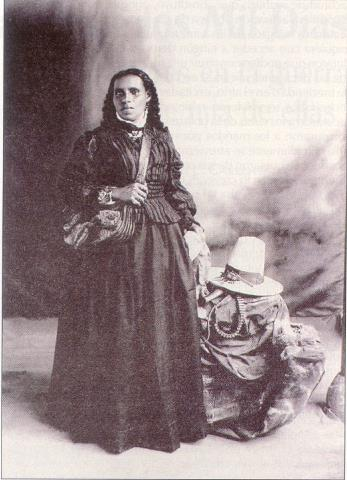
María Anselma Restrepo, guerrilla fighter in the Thousand Days War, 1900, photograph by Benjamín de la Calle.

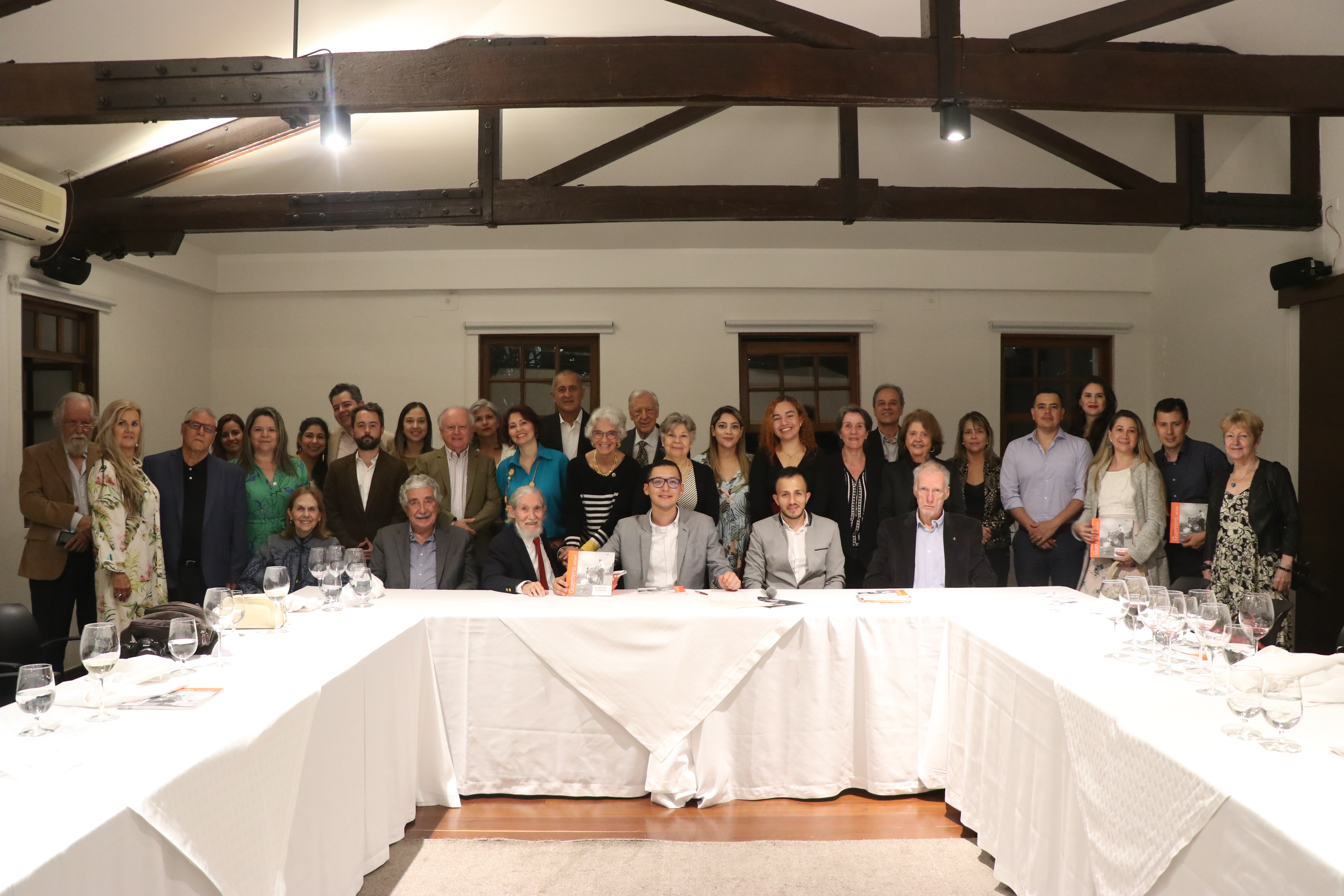
Medellin Photography Club 67th Anniversary Dinner, May 2022

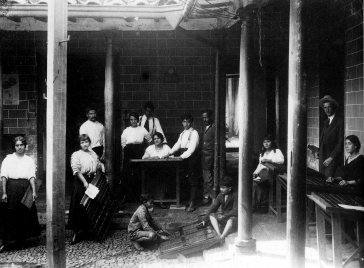
Workers at a printing company, photograph by Benjamín de la Calle.

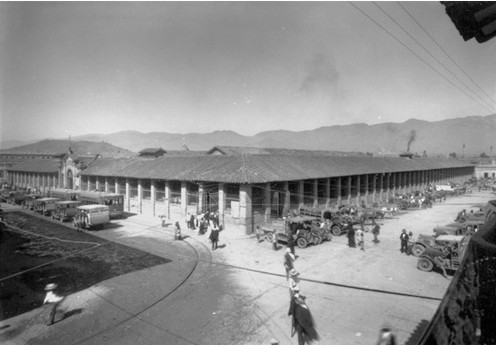
Exterior of the Market Square in Medellín, 1928, photograph by Francisco Mejía.

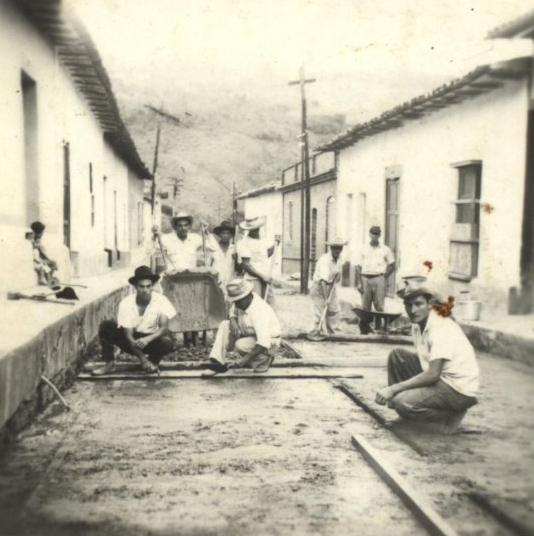
Asphalt of a street in Gramalote, photograph taken around 1950.

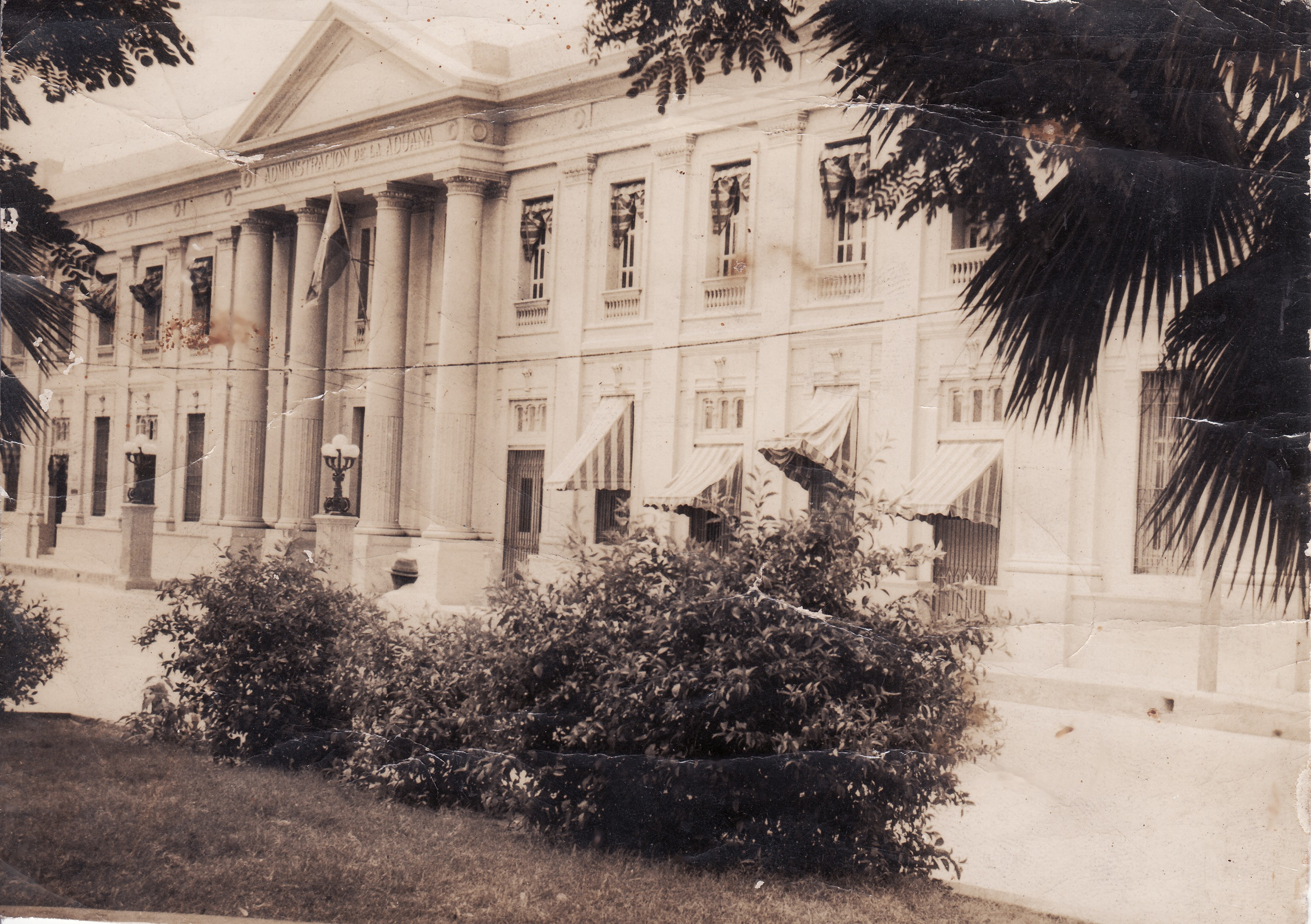
Customs building in Barranquilla, photograph taken around 1940.

Photography in Colombia began with the introduction of the daguerreotype by Baron Gros in 1841. The first photographers, or daguerreotypists, came from the field of painting, including Luis García Hevia, Fermín Isaza, and Demetrio Paredes. The Restrepo brothers later introduced the wet collodion process. At the beginning of the 20th century, the work of Melitón Rodríguez, Leo Matiz, Benjamín de la Calle, and Luis Benito Ramos promoted photographic reportage and photography as a documentary medium. By the mid-20th century, photography in Colombia began to be recognized for its artistic value, largely due to the work of photographers such as Hernán Díaz, Abdú Eljaiek, and Nereo López.

== Origins of Colombian photography ==
At the Industrial Exposition of Bogotá in 1841, the painter Luis García Hevia presented some experimental daguerreotypes that can be considered the first photographs taken by a Colombian, however the oldest image that is preserved is a photograph of the street of the Observatory taken by the French diplomat Jean Baptiste Louis Gros in 1842. The permanence of Baron de Gros in the country and the distance from France allowed Colombian artisans to collaborate in the manufacture of the daguerreotype apparatus.

In parallel to the photographic hobby of Baron de Gros, other foreign daguerreotypists worked professionally in Colombia in the mid-19th century, among them the American John Armstrong Bennet who opened the first photographic studio in Bogotá in 1848, to the Frenchman F. Goñi, the German Emilio Herbrüger and the Englishmen William and John Helsby.

The painter Luis García Hevia, who was known as Evia, became the neogranadine who most actively promoted the spread of photography. Antioquia was the second Colombian region where the invention arrived in 1848 thanks to Fermín Isaza, probably a student of García Hevia at the Academy of Drawing and Painting. who opened a studio in Medellín where he put Daguerre's invention into practice in September 1848. One could also mention Rafael Sanín who was a disciple of Herbrüger and worked in Medellín in 1857.

The daguerreotype was practiced for a decade, as cheaper photographic procedures such as the tintype and the ambrotype were soon introduced. Among the photographers who introduced these procedures in Antioquia were the American Horacio Becker and the Spaniard Antonio Martínez de la Cuadra.

== Commercial photography ==
The photographs taken between 1850 and 1890 were mainly portraits that had almost identical approaches regardless of the photographer who took them. It was the era of photography studios. One of the first was opened by Juan Bennet and García Hevia worked for him, providing photographs of exteriors and of the civil war of 1862, which the studio sold individually or in albums. Another photographer who stood out in those years was Demetrio Paredes, who also entered photography through painting and was a pioneer in the use of photography for political purposes. Other outstanding Colombian photographers were the Escovars, Gutiérrez Ponce and Rafael Villaveces.

In 1858, the company "Wills y Restrepo" was created in Medellín, in which the brothers Vicente and Pastor Restrepo Maya and the photographers Ricardo Wills and Miguel Gutiérrez worked. This company was the one that introduced the wet collodion technique that made photographic copies more affordable using the business card format patented by Disdéri. In 1869, after the death of Wills, the company adopted the name "Vicente y Pastor Restrepo" and ten years later "Restrepo, Latorre y Gaviria" until 1881, when it became "Foto Gaviria" and was run by Gonzalo Gaviria and Juan Nepomuceno Gutiérrez. These companies also had studios in Bogotá and offered the advances that were taking place in the field of commercial photography.

The publication Papel Periódico Ilustrado directed by Alberto Urdaneta gave photography a prominent place alongside the engravings it presented since its foundation on August 6, 1881. Demetrio Paredes and Julio Racines, among others, collaborated on it until its closure in 1888.

Another prominent photographer from the late 19th and early 20th centuries was Melitón Rodríguez, who together with his brother Horacio created a photography company in Medellín under the name "Rodríguez y hermanos" (Rodríguez and Brothers), although in 1899 it changed its name to "Melitón Rodríguez e Hijos" (Melitón Rodríguez and Sons). His graphic work bears witness to life in Antioquia during the last decade of the 19th century and the first decade of the 20th century. Two of his outstanding works are reports on the Bolívar Theater and Bolívar Park taken from the cathedral. Benjamín de la Calle (1869–1934) also made interesting reports on Yamural and Medellín and together with the establishments of the Rodríguez brothers, Rafael Mesa and Fotografía Escovar are the only photographic establishments that appear in the "First Directory of the City of Medellín" for the year 1906. The photographic work of Leo Matiz (1917–1998) in various printed media also occupies a prominent place.

=== The Photographic Club of Medellin ===
On May 15, 1955, the Medellin Photography Club was founded. It was directed by Gonzalo Restrepo Alvarez and among its founding members were Pablo Guerrero, Joaquin Jaramillo Sierra, Juan Guillermo Lodoño, Edwin Bridge Mejia, Horacio Alvarez Correa, Octavio Mesa Tamayo and Jose Tejada Saenz.

The records held by the CFM (in 2005) supposedly correspond to its 50 years of existence; but only the first 15 years (from 1955 to 1970) are referenced; very little of the correspondence, records and chronicles remain, due to the lack of careful conservation and the loss of historical archives and documents.

This is the case with many documented or reported stories; it is inevitable to forget, or at least to overlook facts or people. The 70s and 80s are forgotten; and the 90s and the beginning of the new century, the historical journey of the CFM is fast and almost undocumented; the dimension of the directions or purposes and people of the CFM, who made the history of the organization, around photography, in the city of Medellin, is lost. What seems to be an oblivion, becomes selective and discontinuity appears in the intervention and work of partners who contributed to its development.

The decades without information are those that followed the 15 years of the foundation; when some founding members left the space for new members; a greater effort was necessary, between some old and new members, for the consolidation of the photographic activities, precisely it is a period where the viability of the club was put to the test. There is insufficient documentation in books or publications, which covered a real panorama in a restricted way; but the Club survived in the forgotten or undocumented period.

In May 1973, the club held an extraordinary course on Basic Photography. Octavio L. Mesa was the president and Jorge Cadavid was the director. The course attracted a very good attendance and the participation of prominent professionals of the city in the various aspects of photography. The participants in the course consolidated themselves, at least for one and perhaps for two decades, as the group that would participate in all the activities of the club, and to which others would join as guests.

In 1980, the club celebrated its 25th anniversary with a special commemoration and attendance by founding members and the group of later members. Special recognition was given to the support received by the club from the company Oduperly Ltda. and a heartfelt recognition, with a commemorative plaque, to the four presidents who, in the 25-year period, the club had as president: Dr. Gonzalo Restrepo was followed by Octavio León Mesa; Jorge Cadavid López was followed by Marta Olga Restrepo Uribe.

The CFM functioned as a meeting of partners and friends, amateurs or professionals of photography, with statutes and organization dating back 15 years; and in which it is defined as a non-profit entity and with a common interest in photography, its dissemination and promotion. Thus the club was a permanent school of concerns, experiences and exchange of ideas, always around photography; criticism or analysis of photography was the normal atmosphere of the club, based on the canons of aesthetics and emphasis on basic concepts of composition, lighting, and the message or content of photography, with the particular point of view of the photographer and the technique used. A detailed description of the ideas or concepts that were systematically handled in meetings, different competitions and exhibitions, seminars, courses and conferences is impossible and extensive.

The CFM permanently counted on the presence in all activities of Gonzalo Restrepo Alvarez, Juan Guillermo Londono, Octavio Leon Mesa, Maria Victoria Duperly, Jorge Cadavid Lopez, Alicia Restrepo de Londono, Marta Olga Restrepo Uribe, Juan Fernando Mesa Villa, Leon Duque Giraldo, Fabio Bernal Bernal, Gustavo Adolfo Restrepo Restrepo, Jorge Lopez, Paul Tieck, Maria Isabel Fernandez. As for the founding members, Joaquin Jaramillo Sierra, Pablo Guerrero Hurtado, Horacio Alvarez, Jaime Escobar Restrepo and Jose Tejada Saenz; in the period indicated, they participated more sporadically, but sharing important social or technical experiences; in the conferences, courses and meetings, it is necessary to mention the presence of photographers such as: Luis F. Calderon, Alberto Aguirre, Jairo Betancur, Emilio Serrano, among others..

In 2015, the club celebrated its 60th year of activity since its creation, during which it has had to adapt to the evolution of art and photographic activity in the world. The stated goal of the organization has remained, since its creation, for it to be a response to the desire of its participants and members, and without exception, to keep photographic activity alive in and around the city of Medellín.

During the COVID-19 pandemic, in 2020 and 2021, the traditional Tuesday meetings continued virtually. This allowed to expand membership to people living outside of Medellín and its Metropolitan Area. There are currently members residing in Rionegro, Jericó, Cali, Panama, and the United States.

At the end of 2021, the Medellín Chamber of Commerce at its headquarters in El Poblado, reopens the doors of its modern spaces where weekly meetings continue on Tuesdays, which are now also broadcast virtually.

In 2022, the club will celebrate its 67th anniversary by holding a collective exhibition, the largest exhibition of club members to date with 40 exhibition participants and 46 photographs.

Currently the Club's Board of Directors is made up of: President Santiago Pareja Echeverri, Vice President Juan Chilamack, Treasurer Yuliana Sepúlveda, Secretary Luz Stella Gerlein and members William Arango, Juan Fernando Mesa, Guillermo Gómez, Carlos López and Johnson Garzón.

== Contemporary photography ==
It was not until the 1960s that photography began to be considered an artistic medium, but rather a technique. It was the work of photographers Hernán Díaz, Abdú Eljaiek and Nereo López that provided the elements for this late consideration.

The first major retrospective exhibition of photographs was held in Medellín at the Biblioteca Pública Piloto in 1981 under the title "100 Years of Photography in Antioquia" and two years later another exhibition entitled "A History of Photography in Colombia" was held at the Museo de Arte Moderno in Bogotá. These exhibitions paved the way for the recognition of the so-called "visual memory" of Colombia, increasing institutional interest in photographic archives and the acquisition or donation of funds from the most important photographers.

In 2005, the National Museum of Colombia presented an exhibition of 300 representative photographs from the second half of the 20th century, curated by Eduardo Serrano, whose purpose was to study the development of photography in Colombia taking into account the different thematic and technical aspects present in that period, when

"...photography in Colombia went from being a luxurious pastime and a novel technical tool used by numerous Colombian painters at the end of the 19th century and beginning of the 20th century, to becoming a new language used not only by photographers but also by artists who make it a valuable means of expression.

During this period, the modalities that had emerged with the beginnings of photography reached a high level of development; photographers specialized and the arguments from which they conceptually approached the different themes were transformed."

In the half century, the following themes have captured the interest of photographers:

- The tradition of portraiture;
- The nude;
- Social document;
- Photographic essay;
- Seduction of nature;
- Architecture and urban planning;
- Objects, art and abstraction;
- Performing arts, cinema and fashion;
- Commercial photography;
- Consolidation of graphic reporting and subjective photography.

=== Photography and journalism ===
In the field of photojournalism, one can include Luis Benito Ramos (1899–1955), who some authors consider a pioneer in this field, and Leo Matiz Espinoza, who was doing reports between 1939 and 1997, although he also specialized in portraits. Some photographers who offered their graphic work in relation to the Bogotazo were, together with these two, José Robayo, Sady González, Manuel H. Rodríguez, Carlos Caicedo and Luis Gaitán. This event plays a very important role in photojournalism in Colombia, since it marks a new concept of the same.

Other photographers in this field were:

- Efraín García (Egar).
- Jorge Silva.
- Daniel Rodríguez Rodríguez, assistant and student of camera photography with Ramos.
- Alberto Garrido Solano (born February 6, 1924) who, after being a collaborator of Rodríguez, managed to become Head of Personnel of the newspaper El Espectador.
- Aristóbulo Moreno
- Jorge Parga
- Francisco Carranza.
- Danilo Vitalini.
- Viki Ospina (pioneer photographer in Colombia).
- José Crisanto Lizarazo.
- Jorge Mario Múnera.
- Fabio Serrano.
- Jesús Abad Colorado.
- Erwin Kraus.
- Andrés Hurtado García.
- Zoraida Díaz.
- Luz Elena Castro.

In 1950, the Circle of Graphic Reporters was created, in which José Robayo (1922–2013), Luis Gaitán, Sady González, Alberto Garrido Solano, Carlos Jiménez, Manuel H. Rodríguez and Alicia Chamorro participated, who was a pioneer as a reporter in Colombia.

=== Artistic photography ===
Artistic photography in Colombia began in the 1930s with the first works developed by Carolina Cárdenas Núñez, who often combined portraits and self-portraits with elements of her own artistic production, such as ceramics.

== Bibliography ==
- Londoño Vélez, Santiago, Rafael Mesa. Catálogo de la exposición retrospectiva. Banco de la República, Medellín, 1988.
- Londoño Vélez, Santiago, Benjamín de la Calle, fotógrafo. Catálogo de la exposición retrospectiva, Banco de la República, Medellín, 1993.
- Mejía A., Juan Luis, La fotografía. En: Jorge Orlando Melo, Ed., Historia de Antioquia. Bogotá, Suramericana de Seguros, 1988.
- Serrano, Eduardo, Historia de la fotografía en Colombia. Bogotá, Museo de Arte Moderno / OP Gráficas, 1983.
