= Jorge de León =

Jorge de León may refer to:

- Jorge de León (baseball) (born 1987), Dominican baseball pitcher
- Jorge de León (performance artist) (born 1976), Guatemalan performance artist
- Jorge Díaz de León (born 1984), Mexican football goalkeeper
