= Rigo Peralta =

Dominican artist

- Born: Mario Rigoberto Peralta; San José de las Matas, Dominican Republic
- Education: National Academy of Fine Arts, Santiago de los Caballeros; Art Students League of New York
- Known for: Painting
- Movement: Surrealism

Rigo Peralta is a Dominican artist living in Bethlehem, Pennsylvania, United States.

== Early life ==
Mario Rigoberto Peralta was born in San José de las Matas, Dominican Republic. He studied at the National Academy of Fine Arts in Santiago, Dominican Republic.

He emigrated to New York City in 1989 and studied at the Art Students League of New York. From 2002 to 2003, he served as the art director of the Casa de la Cultura Dominicana.

== Currently ==
Peralta now lives in Bethlehem, Pennsylvania and is a resident artist at the Banana Factory in the South Side of Bethlehem. He paints mainly in oil and is known for his surrealist pieces. His inspiration includes the growing automated nature of mankind, religion, sex, and his nationality. He combines raw and synthetic materials with layered brushwork and printmaking techniques to merge human anatomy with mystical and mechanical elements - a style he refers to as “conditioned surrealism.” He was recently commissioned by the Sands Casino in Bethlehem to produce a series of paintings depicting both the community and the newly renovated steel mill.

His work has been the subject of solo exhibitions in 2005 at the Monsoon Gallery Bethlehem, Pennsylvania, and the Maquinas Universal the North Light Loft Gallery Allentown Pennsylvania, in 2006 at Extreme at the Rio 2 Gallery. New York and in 2007 at the Baum School of Art.

In 1996 he exhibited his work Spiritual Essence at the Boricua College, Gallery Graham Center, Brooklyn, New York. He exhibited his work Mas Alla de Aqui or More There of Here in 1997 at the 97th Street Branch Library in New York. In 1999 he made had another professional exhibit with Witness of the Time which debuted at the Fort Washington Penthouse in New York. More recently, his exhibition, Transition debuted at the Ellarslie Museum in Trenton, New Jersey in 2004

== Collective exhibitions ==
Collective showings including the 1993 Art is Ageless exhibition at the North Concourse Gallery, Albany, New York. He participated in the 1996 Faces of America's Lucent Technologies in Warren, New Jersey, and the 1999 Sintesis de un Lenguaje at the Pearl Gallery, New York.

== Awards ==
2010 Lehigh –Art- Alliance 75th Annual Fall Juried Exhibition at Allentown Art Museum Air Products Foundation Award

2010 Arts Ovation award Outstanding Achievement in the Visual Arts:

2010 Order of Merit citizen, a recognition for Dominicans who had excelled.

2009 The Dominican American Cultural association

2007 Dominican National award, a recognition presented to Dominicans of excellence and pride.

In 2003 he became the first Dominican artist to receive a Presidential invitation to the White House. In 2008 he was presented with the National Dominican Prize by President Leonel Antonio Fernández Reyna of the Dominican Republic.
