= Frieda Medín =

Puerto Rican photographer (born 1949)

- Born: 1949 (age 76–77); San Juan, Puerto Rico
- Education: University of Puerto Rico; Film Video Arts, New York
- Known for: Photography, experimental film, installations
- Style: Black and white photography, feminist art
- Movement: Experimental photography, feminist art

Frieda Medín (born 1949, San Juan, Puerto Rico) is a Puerto Rican artist. She works in photography, film making, experimental cinema and installations.

Medín has considered herself to be a self taught photographer, and is recognized by many as an influential Puerto Rican artist. Frieda Medín is also considered by many as an "experimental photographer", "free lance photographer", and artist in "present day photography". Most of her works are depicted in black and white. Most of her art, which are photographs, depict the women in Puerto Rico and their treatment in such a "patriarchal" environment. Her work is not conservative in any way. It is the opposite and portraits women and the stereotypes, and social ideas and roles created and given to women in Puerto Rico

== Education ==
Frieda Medín was born in 1949, in San Juan, Puerto Rico. He attended the University of Puerto Rico from 1986-198, and attended Film Video Arts in New York in 1988. However, she also attended Casa Aboy and Universidad del Sagrado Corazon in order to learn more of photography but never received anything that stated her attendance, participation, or gain of knowledge from there.

== Artworks ==
Imágenes Arrancadas -Torn Out Images- 1984

These were self portraits and are used to represent not only her life, but also the lives of many women in Puerto Rico. These photographs like her many others are in black and white and interact with shadows and lighting. These photographs depict her nude body.

Rumbos I, II, II, - Directions I, II, III- 1984

These are black and white photographs just like her other works. These photographs also portray women and their lives in Puerto Rico during these times.

Munecas Rotas Series- Broken Dolls Series- 1984

Series of three images, also printed black and white photographs. The first photograph depicts a solo with messy hair floating in the darkness surrounded by broken glass with strong clear lighting reflecting on the doll. The second photograph depicts the same doll looking at herself on a broken mirror, and the reflection of her face and side profile is shown. The third photograph depicts a girl holding the doll by one arm and only the shadow of both is seen. According to Medín, "the doll is the first weapon of society in showing a woman her role".

Installation Called Everything's Fine in Puerto Rico ASS It Is -1985

This installation death with the expectations placed on Puerto Rican women. There is actually a story behind this installation and it dealt with a Puerto Rican contestant that won a beauty pageant. In an interview when asked what she would change in Puerto Rico she stated that nothing and that everything was fine. However Frieda Medín disagreed with that statement because she saw the treatment towards women due to the patriarchal Puerto Rican society.

Aurelia- 1990

Aurelia is a short film in which Frieda Medín was the director and creator. This is a film that depicts the different character that live inside a person. Like all her other works, this film focuses on women.

== Exhibitions ==
Solo Exhibitions

Art student league San juan, 1984

Inter- American University, Puerto Rico 1985

Colegio Universitario de Humacao, Puerto Rico 1988

Group Exhibitions

- New Museum of Contemporary Art, New York 1983
- Museum of Fine Arts of the Institute of Puerto Rican Culture and I Biennial of Havana 1986
- Traditions London and City Gallery, New York 1988
- Plaza Las Americas with the Association of Women Artists of Puerto Rico 1989
- Images of Silence: Photography from Latin America and the Caribbean in the 80s, Museum of Modern Art of Latin America, Washington, DC 1989
- Intimate Lives: Work by Ten Contemporary Latina Artists, Women & Their Work, Austin, TX 1993

== External sources ==
- Medín, Frieda (2018). "Radical Women: Latin American Art, 1960–1985". Panorama. doi:10.24926/24716839.1653. ISSN 2471-6839.
- Images of Silence: Photography from Latin America and the Caribbean in the 80s. Washington, D.C: Organization of American States, 1989. Print
- "Frieda Medín." Radical Women: Latin American Art, 1960-1985Digital Archive. Los Angeles: Hammer Museum, 2019. https://hammer.ucla.edu/radical-women/artists/frieda-medin/.
- Vargas, Kathy, and Arismendi, Connie. Intimate lives : work by ten contemporary Latina artists . Austin, Tex.?: Women & Their Work, 1993. Print.
- "Art". Radical Women: Latin American Art, 1960-1985 Digital Archive. Los Angeles: Hammer Museum, 2019. https://hammer.ucla.edu/radical-women/art/.
- Aurelia 1990
