= Gonzalo Endara Crow =

Ecuadorian artist (1936–1996)

- Born: 1936; Bucay, Ecuador
- Died: 1996 (aged 59–60)
- Education: Central University of Ecuador
- Known for: Painting, sculpture, writing

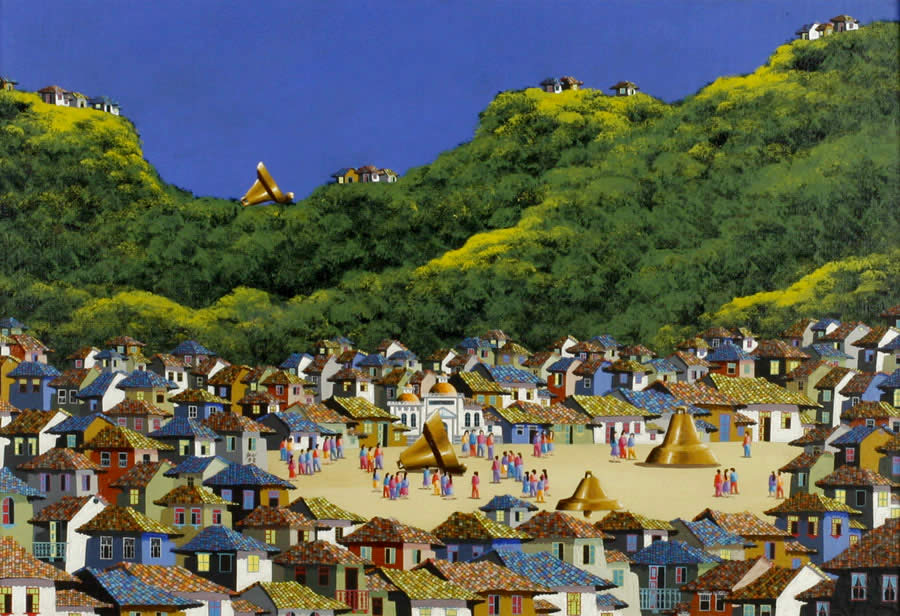
Endara Crow's untitled painting known as Lloviendo Campanas (Raining Bells).

El Cerro de La Iglesia, 1985

Gonzalo Endara Crow (1936-1996, Bucay, Ecuador) was an Ecuadorian writer and painter.

From an early age he was very interested in art and as a young man he studied painting at the Central University in Quito. Endara Crow's work took on a distinct style early in his career that stayed with him throughout his life. Ecuadorian geography and the bright colors used by indigenous artisans in their work were two major influences that penetrated Endara Crow's work for his entire career. Gonzalo Endara Crow is considered one of the most important Latin American painters of the second half of the 20th century. His work was universal and offered an aesthetic perspective of Andean culture and people.

His most recognized painting is "El Tren Volador" (The Flying Train). As a child, Endara Crow was amazed by trains since his grandfather worked at the railroad; this became an inspiration for his masterpiece, in which he depicts a flying train—hence the title—that blends into a colorful mountainous landscape. Another common surreal motif in his paintings was raining bells or spheres as in his Untitled work dated July 29, 1988. Endara was also a sculptor, and sculpted two important monuments in Sangolquí, Ecuador. These two monuments are "El Choclo" and "El Colibrí". Some of his pieces encompass elements of painting and sculpture both such as "El Cerro de la Iglesia" (1985) an acrylic work enclosed inside a wood portal.

Various art historians and critics have referred to his work as magical realism, a term often used when speaking of twentieth-century Latin American literature. Just as in magical realist texts, paintings by Endara Crow seek to expand the categories of what is real so as to encompass myth. Magic and other extraordinary phenomena in nature - all which are excluded by European culture - find their place in Endara Crow's painting.

Magical realism in painting can be distinguished by the way in which reality and fantasy are blended. Any distinction between the two is erased through the combination of fantasy elements and mythology with otherwise unrealistic fiction. As in the magical realist texts of Gabriel García Márquez, Gonzalo Endara Crow's paintings weave in fantastic elements with deadpan presentation transforming the unlikely into certain reality with a subtle mechanism: the treatment of light.

== Books ==
- Gonzalo Endara Crow. Galeria Sosa Larrea Cosmos Editores, Quito. 1987.
- El libro azul / The Blue Book. Representaciones Endara Crow, Quito. 1992.
- Desde la mitad del mundo. Museo Nacional de Bellas Artes, Buenos Aires. 1994.
