= Elena Tejada-Herrera =

Peruvian-American artist

- Born: Lima, Peru
- Education: Pontifical Catholic University of Peru
- Known for: Performance art, multidisciplinary art
- Notable work: Bomba and the Bataclana in the Belly Dance, Paper Animals, Holding the House Together, One Day Around The Neighborhood Choreographing My Dance
- Awards: Passport for an Artist (1st Prize, 1999)

Elena Tejada-Herrera is a trans-disciplinary artist who was born in Lima, Peru and became known for her work in performance and multidisciplinary arts. Her work promotes the participation of the public.

== Performance ==
Elena Tejada-Herrera began her artistic education in the mid-1990s, initially studying painting at the Arts Department at Pontificia Universidad del Peru, but attained public attention in a controversial way.

== Work ==
Elena Tejada-Herrera became known as a painter but got great attention because of her performance artwork. In 1999 Tejada-Herrera presented her video performance Bomba and the Bataclana in the Belly Dance in which the artist appeared as a cabaret dancer along with street sellers that she hired to perform with her. This piece dealt with the body, gender constructions, and incorporated the participation of the public. The artist was awarded the first prize in the art contest Passport for an Artist for this artwork.

From 2002 to 2006, while living in Virginia, Tejada-Herrera focused each time more on pieces that incorporated the participation of the public, like the series Paper Animals, Holding the House Together, One Day Around The Neighborhood Choreographing My Dance. For this piece Tejada-Herrera asked strangers on stores, and in her neighborhood, to teach her how to dance and to choreograph her. Simultaneously she carried on landscape interventions on highways that addressed the drivers as her audience. Other pieces were performances interventions in malls and different public spaces

== Collections ==
Her work is part of the collection of the Museo de Arte de Lima in Peru.
