= Alfonso Arana =

American painter

Alfonso Meléndez Arana
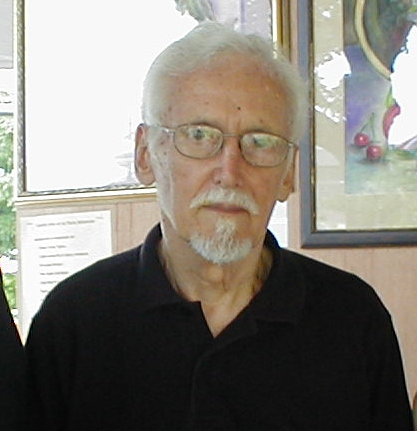
- Born: March 31, 1927; New York City, U.S.
- Died: November 18, 2005 (aged 78); Paris, France
- Education: Atelier de Jose Bardasano, Manhattan School of Arts, Académie Julian, École des Beaux-Arts, American University
- Known for: Painting
- Style: Expressionism, Mannerism
- Spouse: Simone Christophe
- Children: Rosa Meléndez Ibarra

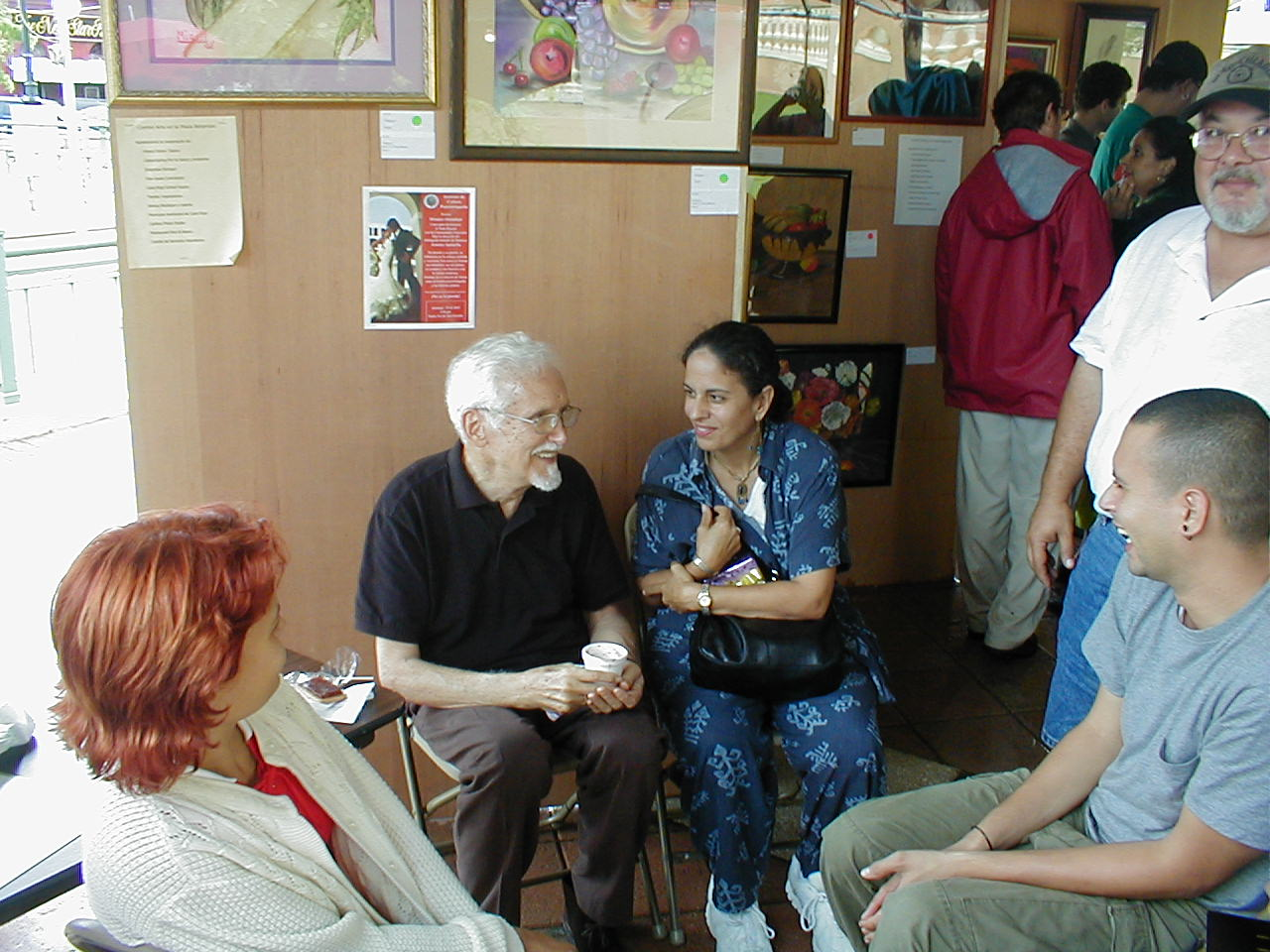
Alfonso Arana during one of his last public appearances.

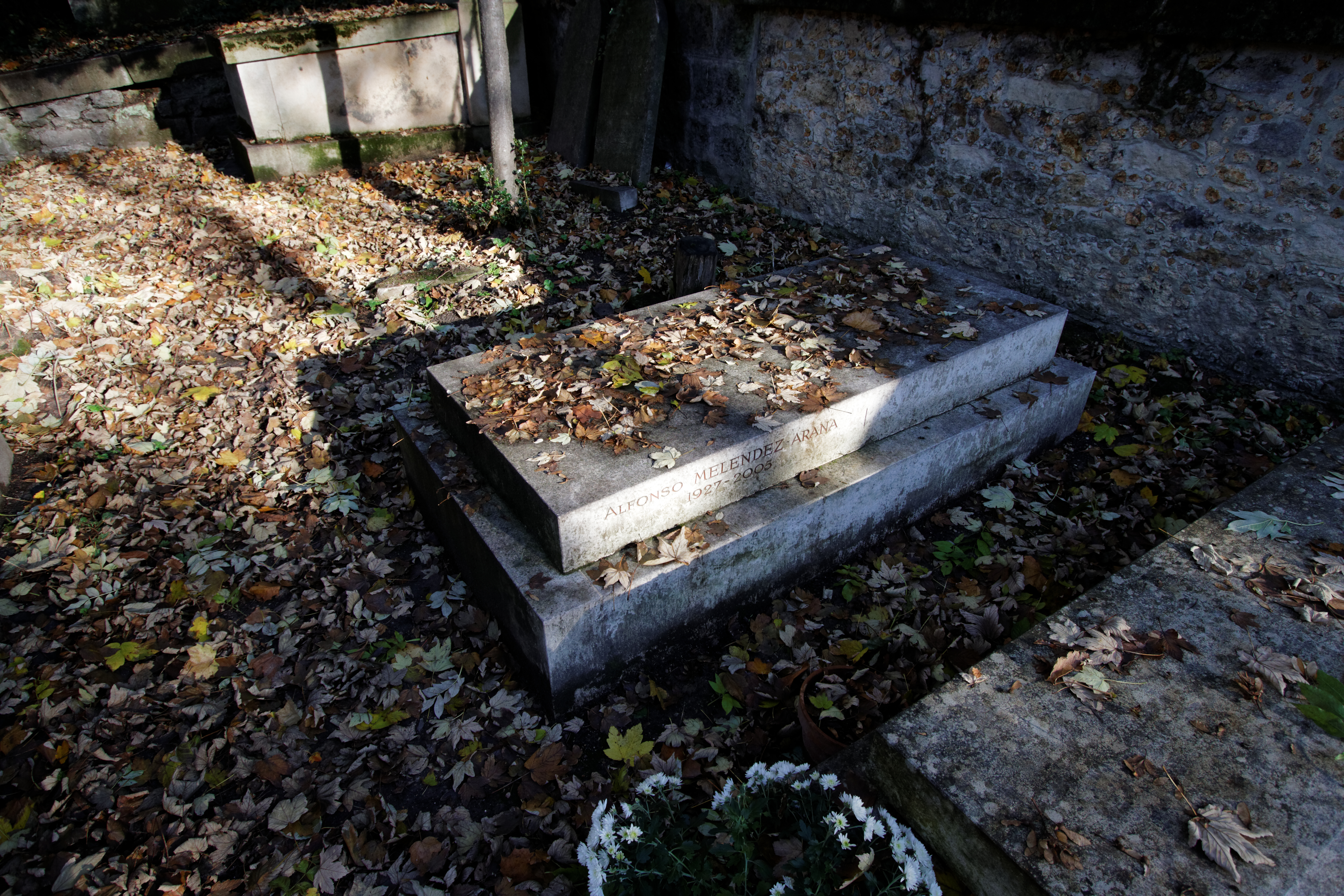
The tomb of Alfonso Arana in Père-Lachaise Cemetery.

Alfonso Meléndez Arana (March 31, 1927 – November 18, 2005) was a painter of Mexican and Puerto Rican ancestry who was born in New York City. As a young man, Arana studied art in Mexico at the Atelier de Jose Bardasano, at the Manhattan School of Arts in New York, the Académie Julian and L'Ecole des Beaux-Arts of Paris, and did post graduate work at the American University in Washington, D.C.

== Early life ==
Arana was born in New York City on March 31, 1927 to a Mexican father and a Puerto Rican mother. When he was young, the family moved to San Sebastián, Puerto Rico where the young painter spent his youth. At age six, Arana made his first picture and presented it to his mother. His father, a businessman, did not want his son to become an artist. This caused a major rift between father and son.

Arana studied art in Mexico at the Atelier de Jose Bardasano, at the Manhattan School of Arts in New York, the Académie Julian and L'Ecole des Beaux-Arts of Paris, and did post graduate work at the American University in Washington, D.C.

Arana became known for his style of almond-shaped, hollow yet expressive eyes in a face without a skull and with a slightly oversized body. He is also well known for his use of light, sophisticated and almost transparent colors. Arana himself defines his style as expressionism and mannerism. The artist once explained that his alive and expressive human figures do not have any skulls because "they are receptacles of the active things in the world as is God, nature, life, whatever we want."

His works are often unsettling for the degree of expression shown by his silent figures. Most initiates to his style might find his paintings to be disturbing. However, after an initial period, viewers of his paintings often find beauty within the figure's expressions.

Arana exhibited his work in Tokyo, Paris, New York, Mexico City, Puerto Rico, and Spain. In 1986, he created the Fundación Francisco Arana, an organization dedicated to foster art. Once a year, the Fundación gives an outstanding art student a scholarship to live and study in Paris.

Arana suffered Parkinson's disease for quite a few years and died of associated complications on November 18, 2005 in his house in Paris in the company of his wife Simone Christophe, and daughter Rosa Meléndez Ibarra. He is buried in Père Lachaise Cemetery in Paris.

Of his art, Arana said:

My figures have the elements of life and light. That light that invades the body is the spiritual side of these beings and I like painting in that spiritual space. Each figure transcends life beyond real life and I feel the beings come from within me and then I, myself become part of their world. They are real to me, they are my friends.

Arana taught his daughter, Rosa Ibarra, who also went on to study and exhibit art in Paris, France.

== See also ==
- List of Puerto Ricans
