= Gonzalo Amancha =

Ecuadorian master watercolor painter

- Born: 1948 (age 77–78); Ambato, Ecuador
- Known for: Watercolor painting
- Spouse: Blanca Elena Calderón Samaniego

Gonzalo Amancha (born 1948 in Ambato) is an Ecuadorian master watercolor painter.

== Biography ==
Amancha began painting and drawing at the age of 5. He got his first job as an artist at the age of 10, when his uncle, who was a painter, took him to Guayaquil to work for Virgilio Jaime Salinas who was well known for creating the first "Juan Pueblo" (a comic strip character famous in Guayaquil). He would apply India ink to Salina's drawings for which he got paid 100-120 sucres per week. At the age of 16 he painted the mural for the Loans Bank of Ambato. He earned a Fine Art's degree from the Central University of Ecuador.

He has an art gallery in Guayaquil, in the neighborhood Las Peñas, on the historic street named Numa Pompilio Llona, where he keeps his paintings and sculptures.

Amancha paints for about 16–18 hours per day. Since the beginning of his art career, he has done close to 7,000 paintings. He has worked with oil, acrylic, pastel, carbon and pencil, but mainly paints with watercolor.

He has shared exhibitions with world-renowned artists from Ecuador such as Oswaldo Guayasamín, Eduardo Kingman, Bolívar Mena Franco, and Aníbal Villacís. He has also done individual exhibitions in Quito, Guayaquil, Ambato, Colombia, Costa Rica, Puerto Rico, Washington, New York, Miami, Madrid, and France, among many other places.

== Influences ==
Amancha has stated that, like many other artists, his first influences were Salvador Dalí and Pablo Picasso. But that his true major influence is the Ecuadorian writer Juan Montalvo (b. 1832 - d. 1889). He has said: "The writings of the great Montalvo have been my main inspiration, the intensity in his works is the driving force behind my creativity, it is my fundamental stimulus".

== Personal life ==
Amancha is married to Mercedes Gabela Solorzano from Guayaquil, they have 5 children. In an interview with the newspaper La Hora in 2003, Amancha confessed that he had a total of 18 children (counting children from other women), 3 of whom are artists.

== Awards and recognitions ==
- First Prize, Painting Salon of Bolivar National College, Ambato (1962)
- Third Prize, Poster Competition, Guayaquil (1970)
- First Prize, Xerox International Painting Hall, Panama
- Second Prize, July Hall, Guayaquil (1982)
- Second Prize, Biennial Watercolor Competition, House of Ecuadorian Culture, Tungurahua (2004)
