= Haroldo González =

Uruguayan artist

- Born: 1941 (age 84–85); Montevideo, Uruguay
- Known for: Drawing, conceptual installations
- Notable work: In which world do you live? (1971), Drawing in 5 Lessons, The Great Zoo, Clues and Evidences
- Style: Conceptual, graphic
- Website: www.haroldo-gonzalez.com

Haroldo González (born in Montevideo, Uruguay in 1941) is an artist, known for drawing. Up to date he has made nineteen solo exhibitions and he has participated in fifty six collective exhibitions. His artworks have been exhibited at several cities of America, Europe, Japan and Africa.

== Collections ==
González's work is a part of the following museums' collections:

- National Museum of Visual Arts, Montevideo, Uruguay.
- National Museum of Fine Arts, Santiago, Chile.
- Center of Art and Communication (CAYC), Buenos Aires, Argentina.
- Midland Group Gallery, Nottingham, England.
- Kansas City Art Institute, Kansas City, U.S.A.
- Kensington Arts Association, Toronto, Canada.
- Open Letter Journal Collection, Toronto, Canada.
- Letterkundig Museum, Utrecht-Holland.
- Alliance Francaise de l´Uruguay, Montevideo, Uruguay.
- The University of Iowa Museum of Art, Iowa City, USA.
- Jack S. Blanton Museum of Art, Austin, U.S.A..
- Juan M. Blanes Museum of Art, Montevideo, Uruguay.

== Installations ==
- In which world do you live? (1971).
- Drawing in 5 Lessons (1972) 1st Edition (Spanish)
- Space and Shape (1973)
- Color-Idea (1973)
- The Great Zoo (1973) 1st Edition (Spanish)
- Drawing in 5 Lessons (1998) 2nd Edition (English/Spanish)
- Clues and Evidences (2005) 1st Edition (Spanish)
- Clues and Evidences (2006) 2nd Edition CD Rom (English)

== Art books ==
- Drawing in 5 Lessons (1972) 1st Edition (Spanish)
- The Great Zoo (1974) 1st Edition (Spanish)
- Drawing in 5 Lessons (1998) 2nd Edition (English/Spanish)
- Clues and Evidences (2005) 1st Edition (Spanish)
- Clues and Evidences (2006) 2nd Edition (English)
