= Hugo Palma-Ibarra =

Nicaraguan artist (born 1942)

- Born: June 11, 1942; Managua, Nicaragua
- Education: University of Florence; School of Ornamental Arts, Rome; Academy of San Marcos
- Known for: Painting, sculpture
- Notable work: Founder of Galería El Águila and Museo Fundación Hugo Palma-Ibarra
- Movement: Modern and contemporary Nicaraguan art
- Awards: Sinigaglia-Unitá Award (1967); Gold Medal, Viareggio Award (1974)

Hugo Palma-Ibarra (born June 11, 1942) is a Nicaraguan artist.

== Biography ==
Palma-Ibarra was born in Managua, Nicaragua in 1942. His father, Idelfonso Palma Martínez, a doctor, and his mother, Inés Ibarra de Palma, from Bluefields; he has 4 sisters and 2 brothers. His younger brother, Ricardo Palma, is a guitarist and composer. He attended the "La Salle" Pedagogical Institute in Managua where he studied for Primary, Secondary and Baccalaureate. Palma-Ibarra later spent 1960-1977 in Italy where he attended and studied medicine at the University of Florence, studied painting at the School of Ornamental Arts in Via San Giacomo, Rome, and took art and history courses at the Academy of San Marcos.

Palma-Ibarra has exhibited his works in the Italo-Latin American Institute in Rome, at Galleria Magenta 52 in Milan, the 49th edition Venice Biennale, and the 10th Quadriennale in Rome.

In 1992 Palma-Ibarra inaugurated the Galería El Aguila, and the Museo Fundación Hugo Palma-Ibarra in 2004, both in Managua, Nicaragua.

His most recent exhibition in 2016 was staged at the Casa Derbyshire del Centro de Arte de la Fundación Ortiz Gurdián de León in Nicaragua in 2016.

== Awards and recognition ==
- Sinigaglia-Unitá Awards in Florence, Italy, 1967.
- Silver Medal, Prize of the City in Lucca, Italy, 1970.
- Silver Medal, Prize of the City in Florence, Italy, 1971.
- Special Award, Silver Cup, City of Colleferro in Rome, Italy, 1973.
- Gold Medal, Viareggio Award in Pisa, Italy, 1974.
- First Prize- Naturaleza 96 in Managua, Nicaragua, 1996.
- Second Prize, First Biennale of Nicaraguan Art in Managua, Nicaragua, 1997.
- Recognized as "Citizen of the 20th Century" by the Comisión 2000 in Managua, Nicaragua.
