= Federico Brandt =

Venezuelan painter (1878–1932)

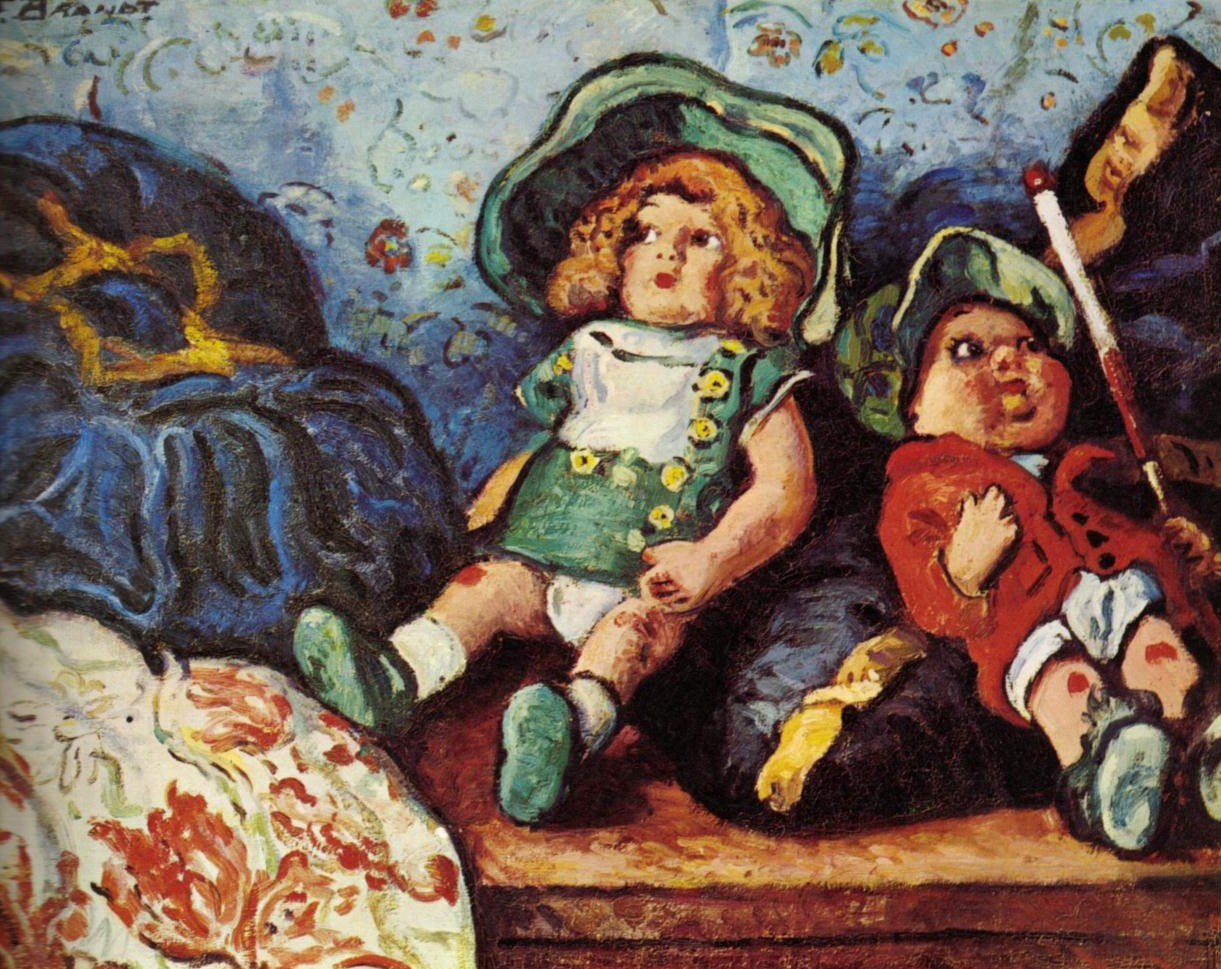
Image of an art work of Federico Brandt, was a Venezuelan painter.

Federico Brandt (17 May 1878 in Caracas – 25 July 1932 in Caracas) was a Venezuelan painter.
