= Susana Raab =

American fine art and documentary photographer

- Born: Lima, Peru
- Education: BA in English Literature, James Madison University; MA in Visual Communications, Ohio University
- Known for: Fine art photography, documentary photography
- Notable work: East of the River (long-term project)
- Style: Documentary, fine art
- Awards: Pulitzer Prize nominee (1998, 2004); White House News Photographers' Project Grant (2005); DC Commission on the Arts and Humanities Artist Fellowship (multiple years); Peter S. Reed Foundation Award (2018); Puffin Foundation Grant
- Website: susanaraab.com

Susana Raab is an American fine art and documentary photographer based in Washington, D.C. She was born in Lima, Peru.

== Education ==
Raab studied and earned a MA in Visual Communications from Ohio University, and also holds a BA in English Literature from James Madison University.

== Photography ==
Raab's photographs have been exhibited in galleries and museums worldwide including the Corcoran Gallery of Art, the Museo de Arte Contemporaneo, Madrid, Spain, the Pingyao Photo Festival, Noorderlicht Fotofestival in the Netherlands, and the Art Museum of the Americas in Washington, D.C.

For the last decade, Raab has been pursuing the long-term documentation of the East of the Anacostia River communities in Washington, D.C. She also works as the photographer of the Smithsonian Anacostia Community Museum. In 2018, Politico Magazine described her photo essay about recent changes in demographics in Washington, DC as "a striking photo essay."

== Awards and recognition ==
She has been twice nominated for a Pulitzer Prize, and has been the recipient of the White House News Photographers' Project Grant, four DC Commission on the Arts and Humanities Artist Fellowships.

- 1998 Nominee, Pulitzer Prize, The New York Times
- 2004 Finalist, Pulitzer Prize, The Palm Beach Post
- 2005 White House News Photographers' Association Project Grant
- 2008 Critical Mass Top 50, Portland, Oregon
- 2008 American Photography 24
- 2009 Finalist, GrandPrize, Fotofestiwal, Lodz, Poland
- 2009 Artist Fellowship, DC Commission on the Arts and Humanities
- 2010 American Photography 26
- 2010 Photo District News Annual
- 2012 Forward Thinking Museum, New York, New York
- 2013 Nominee Prix Pictet
- 2014 American Photography 30
- 2015 American Photography 31
- 2015 Critical Mass Top 50
- 2016 Artist Fellowship, DC Commission on the Arts and Humanities
- 2017 Artist Fellowship, DC Commission on the Arts and Humanities
- 2018 Artist Fellowship, DC Commission on the Arts and Humanities
- 2018 American Photography 34
- 2018 Peter S. Reed Foundation Award
- UMass Dartmouth Claire T. Carney Library Archives and Special Collections
- Puffin Grant

== Collections ==
Raab's photographic work is held in the following permanent public collections:

- Washington, DC Public Art Bank
- Smithsonian Institution's National Museum of American History
- Library of Congress
- Beinecke Rare Book & Manuscript Library at Yale University
- Art Museum of the Americas

== Exhibitions ==
=== Solo exhibitions ===
- 2010 Super-America, Kunstlicht Gallery, Shanghai, China
- 2010 American Vernacular, Irvine Contemporary, Washington, DC
- 2012 Consumed, SALT Gallery, Portland, ME
- 2015 The Invisible Wall, Spagnuolo Gallery, Georgetown University, Washington, DC
- 2016 East of the River, Honfleur Gallery, Washington, DC

=== Group exhibitions ===
- 2002 Eyes of History, Corcoran Gallery of Art, Washington, DC
- 2009 Consumed, Shots, Look3 Festival of Photography, Charlottesville, VA
- 2010 Etc., Pingyao Photo festival, Pingyao, China
- 2011 En Foco Fellowship Show, Blue Sky Gallery, Brooklyn, NY
- 2011 Corridor, Art Museum of the Americas, Washington, DC
- 2011 A Sense of Place, Georgia College & State University, Milledgeville, GA
- 2012 Contents: Love, Anxiety, Happiness and Everything Else, Rayko Photo, San Francisco, CA
- 2012 Contents: Love, Anxiety, Happiness and Everything Else, Newspace, Portland, OR
- 2012 Looking at the Land 21st-Century American Views, FotoDC, Washington, DC
- 2012 Looking at the Land 21st-Century American Views, RISD Museum of Art, Providence, RI
- 2012 Kaunas Photo Festival, Latvia
- 2013 Converging Cultures: Works by Latino Artists, UMW Gallery, Fredericksburg, VA
- 2013 Cotidiano USA, Embassy of Spain, Washington, DC
- 2013 Selections from Time Machine #2: Spectacle: Consumed, Belfast Photo Festival, BBC Screen
- 2013 FotoNovela, III Forum on Latin American Photography, São Paulo, Brazil
- 2014 LATINO/US Cotidiano, Instituto Cervantes, Chicago, IL
- 2014 Select 2014, WPA Project for the Arts, Washington, DC
- 2014 LATINO/US Cotidiano, King Juan Carlos I of Spain Center, NY, NY
- 2014 Photo/Diary, Carroll Square Gallery, Washington, DC
- 2015 Select, Washington Project for the Arts, Artisphere, Arlington, VA
- 2016 The Invisible Wall, The Fence, Boston, MA; Brooklyn, NY; Atlanta, GA; Houston, TX; Albuquerque, NM
- 2016 Hickock Cole Art Night, Washington Project for the Arts, DC
- 2016 Unbound, Candela Gallery, Richmond, VA
- 2016 Women Photojournalists of Washington 10-Year Anniversary Show, National Geographic Museum, Washington, DC
- 2017 Performing the Border, American University Art Museum at the Katzen, Washington, DC
- 2017 Hickock Cole Art Night, Washington Project for the Arts, Washington, DC
- 2018 Southbound: Photographs about the New South, Halsey Institute of Art, Charleston, SC.
- 2018 Not an Ostrich and Other Powerful Images from America's Library, Annenberg Center for Photography, Los Angeles, CA
- 2019 Faces of the Planet, Smithsonian National Air & Space Museum
- 2020 Hunter Museum of American Art, Chattanooga, TN
