= Pablo Marcano García =

- Born: January 15, 1952 (age 74); Gurabo, Puerto Rico
- Education: University of Puerto Rico at Cayey (BSocSc); National Autonomous University of Mexico (MA, PhD)
- Known for: Painting, drawing, community art, political activism
- Notable work: Caribbean Renaissance, Cafetal Urbano, Humacao Vive el Color, Sol Naciente
- Movement: Community art
- Awards: UNEAC Honorary Member (first Puerto Rican recipient)
- Website: Marcanogarcia

Pablo Marcano García (born January 15, 1952, in Gurabo, Puerto Rico), is a Puerto Rican artist. He holds a bachelor's degree in social science (cum laude) from the University of Puerto Rico at Cayey. In 1975 he completed all his partial requirements for obtaining his Master's and Doctorate, simultaneously, in Political Science at the National Autonomous University of Mexico (UNAM). In January 1985, his book The Criminality and Crisis of Prisons in Puerto Rico was published, which has been used by prominent sociologists, criminologists, and jurists in the country's universities.

At the age of 30, he took up drawing and painting under the tutelage of Carlos Irizarry. He also received guidance from African-American artists Jamil (Bryson Harris) and Rashid Wright.

In 2004, Marcano García founded, in union with Puerto Rican singer-songwriter Danny Rivera, the International Institute of Fine Arts and Music. This novel pedagogical project is inclusive and itinerant in nature, and grants scholarships to talented and resource-poor Latin American youth to study in the field of fine arts and music.

Outstanding art critics from the Caribbean region, such as Cuban art critic Adelaida de Juan, consider the work of Marcano García as exceptional. Currently, important private and public collections, in and out of Puerto Rico contain pieces by this artist.

In 2009, together with the young artist Rosana Vázquez Medina and Nelson Díaz, he developed his concept of community art (Caribbean Renaissance, Cafetal Urbano, Humacao Vive el Color, Sol Naciente) with which he achieves a living work of great color and emotional impact.

He was a Resident Artist of the University of Turabo, an institution with which he collaborated in these last decades.

== Political activism ==
In 1978, Pablo, together with Nydia Cuevas Rivera, took hostage the Consul of Chile in the Chilean Consulate in Puerto Rico. They demanded the release of the Puerto Rican political prisoners, and the ceasing of celebrations in the island of 4 July Festivities (as it happened at 3 July). They were arrested after 22 hours in the consulate. For them it would've been 22 years in jail for 22 hours, but the sentence was lowered to seven years only. Pablo was sent to a prison in New York State. When he was released in 1985, a big crowd of people welcomed him at Luis Muñoz Marín International Airport in Puerto Rico. Among them were Rafael Cancel Miranda, Isabel Rosado, and Doña Consuelo Ferré, among others.

== Personal life ==
He has four children. He has, along with singer Danny Rivera, the Dominican Republic citizenship since 2007. He was granted the UNEAC Honorary Member title. He was the first Puerto Rican to get it.

== Sources ==
- nydailynews
