= Rosmery Mamani Ventura =

Bolivian artist

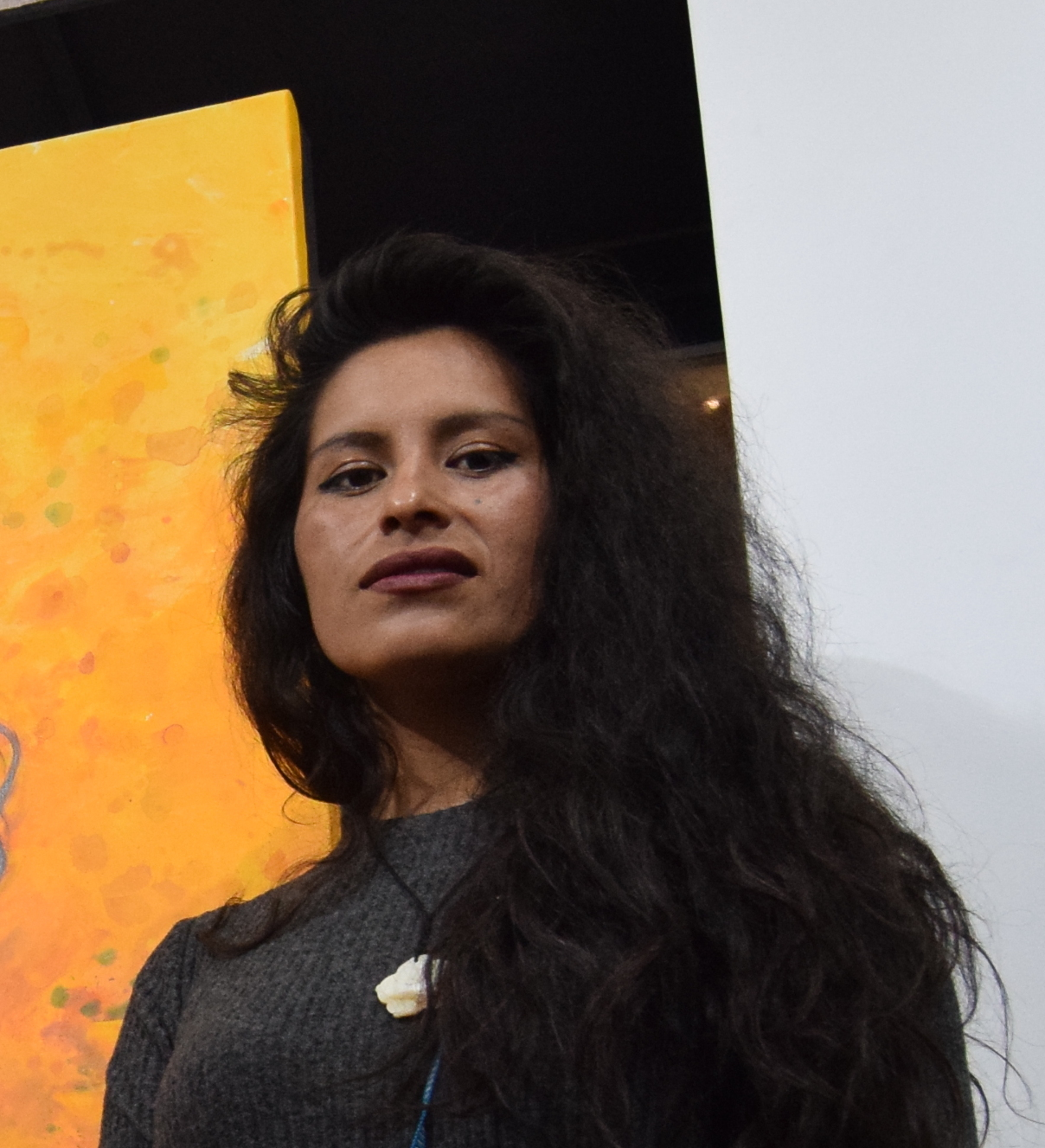

Rosmery Mamani Ventura (born in Cajiata on October 27, 1985) is a Bolivian painter. Her work is very realistic, with a high level of detail.

== Biography ==
She was born in Omasuyos, near Lake Titicaca where she lived until 1998. Her parents are Teresa Ventura and Enrique Mamani Achata. She has five siblings.

She moved to El Alto when she was 14 years old. About her migration process, she said

I came to work as a maid, as many others from the country. That's something many people ignore about me.

She finished school in El Alto. She began studying accounting at Universidad Pública de El Alto, UPEA, but in 2005 she decided to quit, and study art at Escuela Municipal de las Artes de El Alto. She graduated in 2009. Some of her professors: Edgar Cruz Mariaca, Mario Careaga, Adamo Mollericón, y Ricardo Pérez Alcalá. About her first steps, Mamani says:

At first, I didn't have any money, so I made my first paintings for Bs 2. At 16 de Julio Fair I used to buy recycled material. A piece of chalk cost 50 cents and brown paper for Bs 1. I used them to paint my first portraits.

== Awards and distinctions ==
- Premio nacional de dibujo "El Valor del Dibujo", Fundación Fernando Montes Peñaranda, La Paz, 2008.
- Mención de Honor, concurso "Salón de Invierno", Cochabamba, 2009.
- Primer Premio Nacional, Concurso del "Salón Municipal 14 de Septiembre, Arte Joven", Cochabamba, 2009.
- Primer Premio de dibujo y grabado, concurso "Salón Municipal de Artes Plásticas, Pedro Domingo Murillo en La Paz, 2009.
- Premio único, concurso "Octubre Negro", categoría egresados de la ciudad de El Alto, 2010.
- Primer premio en pintura en el concurso "Cambio Climático y Seguridad Alimentaria, La Paz, 2010.
- Segundo premio internacional "Bice Bugatti-Giovanni Segantini 2011", en Nova Milanese, Italia, 2011.
- Segundo premio, categoría retrato, I certamen de la exposición virtual de pintura al pastel, Asociación de Pinturas Pastelistas de España (ASPAS), España, 2012.
- Primer lugar en la "II Exposición virtual de realismo", España, 2013.
- Primer lugar II Bienal Internacional de Oviedo", España, 2013.

== Exhibitions ==
- La Maison, París, 2010

== See also ==
- Ricardo Pérez Alcalá
- Mónica Rina Mamani
- Adda Rita Donato Chico
- Rafaela Rada
- Antagónica Furry
- Susana Villegas Arroyo
