= Connie Arismendi =

Chicana visual artist

Connie Arismendi (born 1955) is an American Chicana visual artist who works primarily in sculpture and mixed media installations. She lives in Austin, Texas.

== Early life and education ==
Arismendi was born in 1955. She is the daughter of a Mexican mother and a Filipino father. They moved frequently before settling down in Corpus Christi, Texas.

She received a BFA degree from the University of Texas, and a MFA degree from School of the Art Institute of Chicago.

== Art career ==
Arismendi's inspiration stems from her attraction to or interest in an object rather than an abstract concept. The goal of her artwork is to provoke an emotional response or recollection from the viewer.

In 1999, her exhibition Ascent of Memory was the final show for the Galería Sin Fronteras in Austin, Texas.

Her artworks La Noche en Sevilla, Bishounen (Beautiful Boy), and Sevilla are in the permanent collection of the United States Embassy in Belmopan, Belize. She formed a partnership with Laura Garanzuay to form Arismendi Garanzuay Studio in 2005. Together, they created Rayo de Esperanza/A Beacon of Hope: Cesar E. Chavez Memorial Sculpture.

She made an aluminum sculpture for the Austin Public Library Terrazas Branch. The aluminum plate screen fixture was made in the style of papel picado.

== Exhibitions ==
- ¡Arte Caliente! Selections from the Joe A. Diaz Collection. March 26, 2006 – June 11, 2006. San Jose Museum of Art, San Jose, California
- No Absolutes: Contemporary Art from the Region. October 8, 2000 - January 7, 2001. Arizona State University Art Museum, Tempe, Arizona

== Collections ==
- Polk Museum of Art, Lakeland, Florida
- Art Museum of South Texas, Corpus Christi, Texas
