= Manuel Zorrilla =

Argentine artist (1919–2015)

Manuel Zorrilla de la Torre
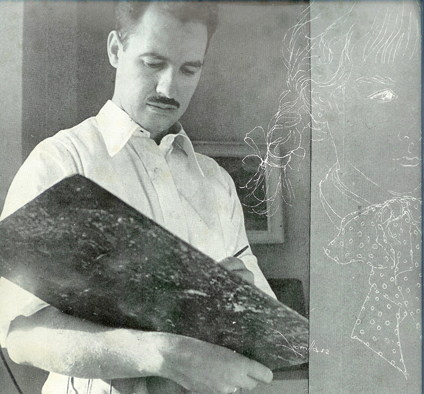
- Manuel Zorrilla
- Born: 26 April 1919; Buenos Aires, Argentina
- Died: 12 May 2015 (aged 96); Fontenay-le-Fleury, France
- Known for: Painting drawing sculpture

Manuel Zorrilla de la Torre (26 April 1919 – 12 May 2015) was an Argentine painter, illustrator, engraver, drawer, and sculptor.

== Early life ==
Zorrilla was born in Buenos Aires in 1919 as the child of Spanish immigrants.

From his childhood, he took delight in painting the rural world that surrounded him. The fauna (horses) and the flora (fruit trees, flowers) are inexhaustible sources of inspiration. In 1942, he was exposed for the first time to other artists: critics noticed and greeted him as a young hope for the Fine Art. This year marked the beginning of exhibitions, greeted by the press, which remained continuous until 1980.

Eminently self-taught, his academy is the life in all its appearances. Since 1935, he worked with graphic and advertising studios. Quickly he turned towards The Argentine Plastic Artists Society and to The Circle of Fine Art, in Buenos Aires, to draw the nude. It is in the zoo, in the botanical garden, in agricultural shows and in the parks of Buenos Aires where he found his models to draw the nature. In the Circle of Fine Art, the sculptor Arturo Dresco offered him his first clay to model. But the meeting with Alcides Gubellini, Italian painter and sculptor, turned out to be determining. He advised Zorrilla on his drawings and later introduced him to oil painting, and guided his first steps. Zorrilla considered Gubellini as his true master.

== Career ==
From 1949 until 1953, Zorrilla received numerous prizes like the " Watercolorists and Engravers Society Prize ", the "National Show of Drawing and Engraving Prize", the "Fine Art Society of Santa Fe Prize", the "Fine Art Society of Rosario Prize" and the "Fine Art Society of Mar del Plata Prize". In 1954 he was elected vice-president of the Argentine Society of the Plastic Arts.

A tireless traveler in Latin America and in Europe, Zorrilla was interested in the landscapes and the human being in his environment. His work tells the life: in the harvests, to the factory, the "cariocas" from Rio de Janeiro (exposed at the Art museum of São Paulo in Brazil), Indians of the Argentine northwest, the tango in Buenos Aires, the forest in Venezuela but also Paris and the Seine, Rome and its monuments, Venice and Spain. The women is also a subject declined in plenty of "figures". His works of composition are numerous like: " The seat of Numance", " The ground universe and his populations” and the series " The sea " and “The Big River”.

In 1982, Zorrilla came to settle down in France, to Fontenay Fleury (Yvelines), among which the old village and its fields were sources of inspiration. He also began writing poetry and did several works where he often took back the subjects developed in his pictorial work. Zorrilla died in 2015 in Fontenay-le-Fleury, France.

== Exhibitions ==
Manuel Zorrilla made a lot of individual exhibitions in Argentina on Wildenstein, Witcomb, Peuser, Müller, Perla Marino, El Nauta galleries; In Brasil, on Ibeu Gallery, Fine Arts Museum of São Paulo; in France, on Marcel Bernheim Gallery, Theâtre de Fontenay le Fleury.

He also participated on various collective exhibitions : "Obras de 30 pintores argentinos" Kraft (1951), "Caballos" Wildenstein (1960), "Pintura argentina" Gran Teatro Opera (1965), "Exposicion del grabado" Casa América(1965), "Muestra de pintores argentinos" Perla Marino y Club Atlético River Plate, "Motivos de tango" Ateneo Popular de la Boca (1974), "Muestra colectiva de Marinas" El Nauta (1975), "Maestros Argentinos del Dibujo" América (1975), Carroussel du Louvre Paris (2001), and as "invité d'honneur" of "Couleurs et Passion 2004" Exhibition in Cheptainville (2004) France.

== Prizes and awards ==
=== Prizes ===
Year	Exhibition	Prize	Prized works
1949	34th Sociedad de los Acuarelistas y Gravadores Exhibition	First prize of painting given by the president of jury Alfredo Gonzalez Garaño	Painting "Caballos"
1950	27th Santa Fe Beautiful Arts Exhibition	Painting prize	Oil painting "Figura de mujer colla"
1950	29th Rosario Fine Arts Exhibition	"Adquisicion" prize from instituto social de la Universidad del Litoral	Oil painting "Puerto"
1950	35th Sociedad de Acuarelistas y Gravadores Exhibition	First prize of drawing given by the president of jury Alfredo Gonzalez Garaño	Pastel sanguina "Figura Coya (mujer)"
1950	9 Mar del Plata fine arts Exhibition	First prize of drawing	"Coya"
1950	Bahía Blanca Exhibition	Bahía Blanca prize	
1953	Dibujo y Grabado national Exhibition	Second Prize of drawing	Pastel sanguina "Martita Liliana"
1954	7th publicity fine Exhibition	First Prize Arte Folletos	

=== Awards ===
In 1954, Manuel Zorrilla was named Vice President of Argentina Society of Plastics Arts. In 1974, Manuel Zorrilla received the Gold Medal of Llave Mohosa n°199 by the painter Esteban Semino. On 5 October 1974, he received the Gold Award of "Ateneo Popular de la Boca" given by the Conseiller Victor C. Pereira

== Techniques developed ==
Oil Painting on toile, wood and cartouline paper. Pastel, oil pastel, charbon, crayon. Drawing, china ink, colors ink, he developed a personal technic : acuarela ink. Fresco and ceramic painting. Lithography monochrome and color. Serigraphy. Terra cota Sculpture.

== Bibliography ==
- Interview from RIO magazine, Rio de Janeiro, Brasil, June 1952
- TV interview on Canal 7, émission IMAGENES PLASTICAS, 1953
- Interview from PROPAGANDA magazine, article "Manuel Zorrilla. Pintor, ilustrador, maestro de un nuevo motivo de plastica", October 1954
- Interview from DIBUJANTES magazine, article "La publicidad ha ganado un artista de extraordinaria sensibilidad", Mars 1957
- Radio interview "Arte y musica" from Radio municipal de Buenos Aires, September 1971
- Reportage by Radio El Mundo dans l'émission "Argentina Cultural" by Carlos Arturo Orfeo the 5 August 1964
- Discussion with José de España at the Galeria Gran Teatro Opera exhibition in August 1964
- Discussion with José de España at the Galeria Reguan Exhibition in September 1974
- Article from Habitat 8 magazine (1952) from Fran Martins (Arts museum of São Paulo exhibition – Brazil)
