= Julio Aguilera =

Venezuelan-American painter and sculptor

- Born: Julio César Aguilera Peña; July 28, 1961 (age 65); Catia, Caracas, Venezuela
- Education: Instituto Pedagógico de Caracas
- Known for: Painting, sculpture, martial arts
- Notable work: Blue Series, bronze sculpture series
- Style: Neo-expressionism, figurative
- Movement: Hispanic diaspora art
- Spouse: Janice Tuohy (div. 2001)
- Awards: Bare Hand Kung-Fu World Championship; 1987

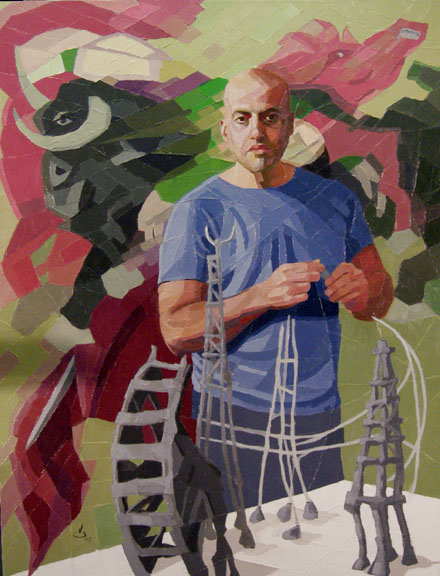
Julio Aguilera by Venezuelan painter Vicente Saavedra

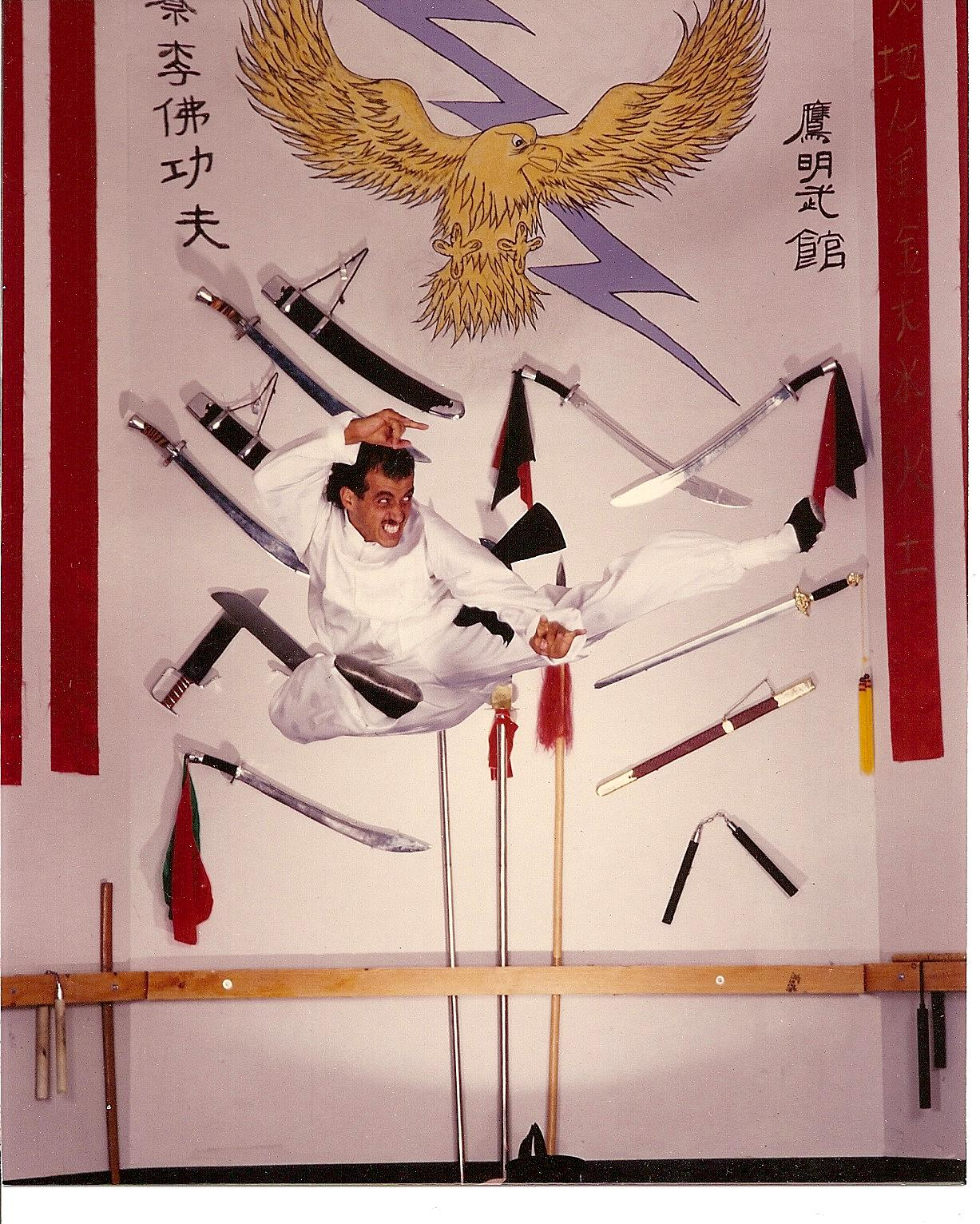
Julio Aguilera during his still hairy Kung Fu days.

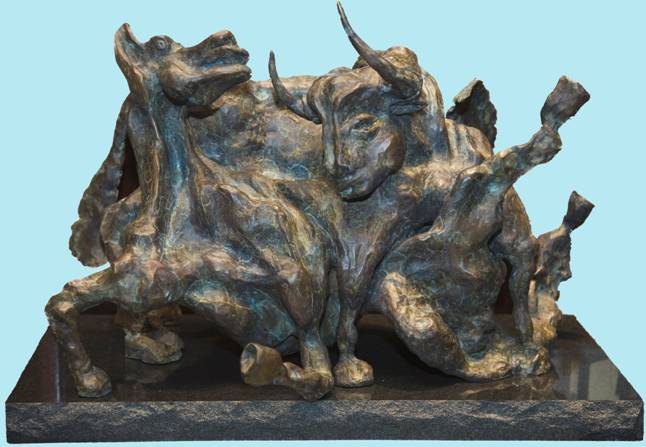
War and Peace. Bronze, 2004

Julio César Aguilera Peña is a Venezuelan-American painter and sculptor born in Caracas, on July 28, 1961. Previously to his career as an artist, Aguilera was awarded the sixth Dan in Kung Fu when he was just 26 years old.

== Biography ==
Aguilera was born in Catia, one of the poor neighborhoods surrounding Caracas. His mother died at birth and he was raised by his grandmother and other relatives. At age 6, he was making a living as a shoe polisher while attending primary school. After graduating from high school in 1978 from the Colegio San Agustin, Julio studied at the Instituto Pedagógico de Caracas.

Aguilera was inclined towards the arts since he was in primary school, and he began painting at a young age after a local painter gave him a handful of used brushes and half-empty tubes of oil paint. However strong, his artistic inclinations had to take a back seat for several years while Aguilera struggled to move out of the slums. During this time, he painted mostly for enjoyment, giving away his canvases to friends and relatives while he made his way through school. While at the Instituto Pedagógico, Julio enrolled himself in the academy of Chan Lee Kam Fai, one of Venezuela's most renowned martial arts training academies., unbeknownst Julio, he would later become the future president of the Venezuelan Federation of Chinese Martial Arts and the International Hung Sing Choy Li Fat Chan Kim Fay. This decision temporarily separated him from his artistic career due to the success he would enjoy as a martial artist.

In July, 1978, Aguilera earned the black belt in the Choy Lay Fut Kung-Fu style, and during that and the following year he participated in several international competitions and exhibitions, including the Muay Thai World Championship in Manila, Philippines, the Barehand Championship in China and the International Martial Arts Open of Puerto Rico, which he won in 1979. From that year until 1981, he stayed on the Caribbean island, working as a trainer in Santurce, until he was handpicked to co-develop in Venezuela Top Spa Gym at the time the most successful gym in Caracas, located in Las Mercedes sector of the city. Two years later, he was part of the Venezuelan Martial Arts team at the 1983 Pan American Games in the same city.

In 1983, Aguilera met and married Janice Tuohy, an American choreographer working in the local theater and TV industry. With Touht he opened a multidisciplinary academy with dancing and languages training directed by Touht herself and other Venezuelan professionals such as Anita Vivas, Antonio Drija and Betty Kaplan. The academy didn't last a year and in 1984, Julio and his wife moved to the United States.

After a brief stay in New York City, in 1985 Julio moved to Diamond Bar, California, and opened another martial arts academy under the name "Eagle Lighting". This time, the business was a success and in a few years he opened other branches in Marina del Rey, San José and Sacramento. It was while he taught Martial Arts in California that he won the Bare Hand Kung-Fu World Championship in August 1987. That same month, he was awarded the 6th Dan in China Kung-Fu, I Ching Kung-Fu by the International Kung Fu Federation. Despite all those achievements, Aguilera retired from Martial Arts in 1987, closed down the academies and moved to New York City with his wife. During the following years he flirted with corporate America and the tried opening a few businesses himself, but the Californian success didn't repeat in New York City, where he divorced Janice Touht in 2001.

During his years in California, Julio always kept a studio inside the academy, where he painted with lukewarm success. After the several failed business ventures, he began painting professionally around 1997. That year, he bought fifty canvases and in three months developed what is known as the Blue Series. Aguilera promoted these pieces through web forums and the Venezuelan Consulate in New York, and by 2000 his work had been exhibited in Spain, Argentina and Venezuela in sold-out shows.

After a show in the Venezuelan Consulate in 2003, Julio was appointed as the Venezuelan Cultural Attaché in New York City, a position he held until 2006. At the same time, he became the General Manager of the El Nuevo Cojo Ilustrado a Hispanic general interest magazine based in Harlem, and started to experiment with bronze, producing a series of statues from his studio in New Jersey.

About his art, critics are uniform about Aguilera's style. He's unashamed about the influence of Picasso and other Spanish master like Goya, El Greco and Velázquez. And according to the art critic Ed McCormack, Managing Editor of Gallery & Studio Magazine, "more than any other artist in the Hispanic Diaspora, Aguilera has brought new blood, so to speak, to that still vital tradition, which came to encompass not only the spirit of Spain but all the antique cultural booty that the canny old pirate, Picasso, looted from France Italy and the North."

== Recent exhibitions ==
- 2019 - Red Dot at Art Basel Miami, Miami, Florida
- 2016 - Art Basel Extension Calle 8, Miami, Florida
- 2016 - Art Basel, Miami, Florida
- 2015 - Afropolis in Gardens Art Basel, Miami Gardens, Florida
- 2015 - Mana Art Basel, Miami, Florida
- 2014 - Mana Art Basel, Miami, Florida
- 2013 - Symposium Sculpture New Art Arcaelogy, Boston, Massachusetts
- 2013 - Symposium Sculpture, Nashua New Hampshire
- 2006 - Davidoff of Geneva. New York City.
- 2005 - Venezuelan Consulate Gallery, New York City.
- 2004 - Citibank Park Avenue. New York City.
- 2004 - Marriott Marquis, New York, New York.
- 2004 - Art. Atlanta. Atlanta Convention Center. Philadelphia, Pennsylvania.
- 2004 - Thyme Gallery, Havertown, Pennsylvania.
- 2004 - Venezuelan Consulate Gallery, New York City.
- 2004 - Art Philadelphia, Philadelphia Convention Center.
- 2004 - International ArtExpo. Jacob Javits Center, New York City.
- 2004 - Décor Expo International, Jacob Javits Convention Center New York City.
- 2004 - Citibank. One Rockefeller Plaza, New York City.
- 2003 - Venezuelan Center, New York City.
- 2003 - Frames Works Galleries. Holland, Michigan.
- 2003 - Kandu Galleries. Holland, Michigan.
- 2003 - International Art Expo, Las Vegas, Nevada.
- 2003 - General Motors / GMC. East Hampton, New York.
- 2003 - Art Chicago, - Navy Pier. Chicago, Illinois.
- 2003 - Art Atlanta, - Atlanta Convention Center. Atlanta, GA.
- 2003 - International ArtExpo. Jacob Javits Center New York City.
- 2003 - Galleria West, New Jersey.
- 2003 - Art Miami, Miami, Florida.
- 2003 - Latin Museum. Miami, Florida.
- 2002 - La Gallerie. East Elmhurst, New York.
- 2002 - La Gallery. New York City.
- 2002 - Palm Springs International Art Fair. Convention center Palm Springs, California.
- 2002 - Feria Cuadro Madrid, Spain.
- 2002 - Venezuelan Consulate Gallery. New York City.
- 2001 - International Art Fair. Montreal, Canada.
- 2001 - Venezuelan Consulate Gallery, New York City.
- 2001 - Art Atlanta. Atlanta Convention Center.
- 2001 - Richards. Greenwich, Connecticut.
- 2000 - Décor Expo International, Jacob Javits Center. New York City.
- 2000 - Feria Iberoamericana de Arte. Caracas, Venezuela.
- 2000 - ArtBa Feria de Arte Contemporáneo. Buenos Aires, Argentina.
- 2000 - Venezuelan Consulate Gallery, New York City.
- 1999 - Huntington Public Library, Huntington, New York.
- 1999 - Cosi Public Display. Huntington, New York.
- 1998 - Galleria Portal. Barcelona, Spain.
