= Monsoon gallery =

Coordinates: 40.61207°N 75.37806°W

Monsoon Gallery is the largest independently owned fine art gallery in the Lehigh Valley region of Pennsylvania. Located in Bethlehem, Pennsylvania, it is known for its unique collection of established local, national and international artisans' works of art.

== Artists ==
Among the notable artists whose works are displayed at Monsoon gallery are:

- Salma Arastu: Mixed-media artist from India, whose works have been exhibited and collected around the world
- Alexandru Darida: Former official painter for Nicolae Ceauşescu, the former president of Romania
- Howard Finster: Folk artist who has produced gospel-inspired art
- Stanley Mouse: Psychedelic artist who designed album covers for the Grateful Dead

== Art director ==
The gallery is owned and operated by Ranjeet Solanki Pawar; member of the Bethlehem Fine Arts Commission and Former Co-Chair of Filmmaker Committee for 2004 SouthSide Film Festival. His family had emigrated from India not long before his great grandfather, Chaudhary Charan Singh, became the Prime Minister of India in 1979.
