= Bernardo Ríos =

Bernardo Ríos is a Colombian artist.

His artwork takes in slice of life themes distilled from rural Colombian life.

His artistic style is based on what he calls "foquism" which may be considered as an extension in terms of style of art presented by the cubism of Picasso or the works created by Georges Braque, Franz Marc, or Lyonel Feininger or even the futurist art movement. However, Ríos maintains that his work is free from these influences and is simply based on the distortions that can be created by light through its reflection or refraction and it is this essence that most defines his work and artistic style. In addition, he includes small "symbols" in his canvases which represent sounds.

Ríos uses glaze and scumble to create the geometric effects found within the images of his works. Occasionally he also uses a palette knife to provide certain effects within his paintings.

In recent years his works have been exhibited in the UK and Italy as well as Mexico and the USA.

== Online References ==
- ExpoEscocia 2011 Bogota, Colombia & Irvine, UK
- Clifton Gallery Bristol, UK
- Newspaper Colombia Exhibition Information (Spanish)
- Pereira News Information (Spanish)
- Colombian Gallery Info in Spanish
- Saatchi Art Gallery Online Gallery
- DIFOCUR: Exhibition in Culiacán, Sinaloa, Mexico
- Colombian Art at Wordpress: The Art of Bernardo Ríos
