= Nereo López =

Colombian documentary photographer

Nereo López Meza
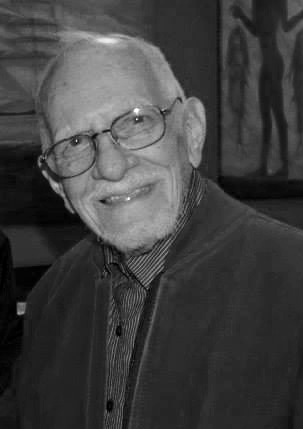
- Nereo López Meza
- Born: 1 September 1920; Cartagena, Colombia
- Died: 25 August 2015 (aged 94); New York City, US
- Known for: Documentary photography

Nereo López Meza (born Cartagena, 1 September 1920 - died New York City, 25 August 2015) was a Colombian documentary photographer. He is regarded as a pioneer of the genre in his native Colombia. He was a member of the "grupo de Barranquilla", a loose association of writers, artists and intellectuals that included Álvaro Cepeda Zamudio, Gabriel García Márquez, Alejandro Obregón, Rafael Escalona and Julio Mario Santo Domingo among others. He took more than 100,000 photos in a career spanning many decades. His work brought attention to the communities living in the valley and mountainous ranges of Colombia.
