= Jorge de León (performance artist) =

Guatemalan performance artist (born 1976)

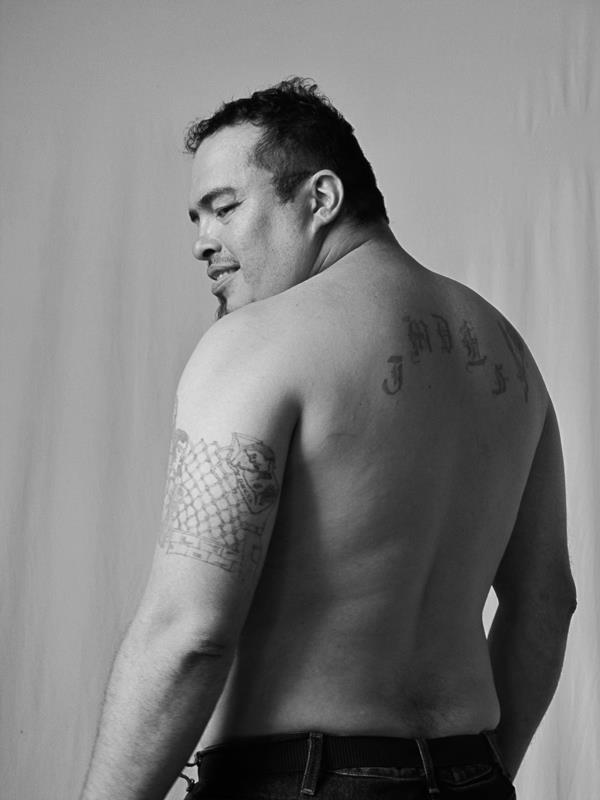
- Born: 1976 (age 49–50); Guatemala City, Guatemala
- Known for: Performance art; body art; art objects; urban interventions
- Style: Political art
- Movement: Post-war generation of Guatemalan artists

Jorge de León (born 1976) is a Guatemalan performance artist who specializes in body art and art objects. He was born in Guatemala City, and forms part of the post-war generation of artists that includes Regina José Galindo and Anibal López. His work is extremely influenced by his past as a gang-banger. Before he became an artist, Jorge was in and out of jail twelve times, and now looked to art as a means of confronting the gang violence rampant in Guatemala. His work is extremely political and seeks to question the dynamics of power in one of the countries in Latin America that has been more affected by extreme inequality, violence, and political corruption.

== Artwork ==
De León’s work centers on urban violence in Guatemala City, which is influenced by his former involvement in gangs. De León has commented that the rich live by double standards, “they are thieves, but they kill us saying we are thieves... At least gang members are honest. If (they) rob, they say it. If they take drugs they say it.” Although his work centers on the use of the body, De León also explores art objects and urban interventions.
