= Pellegrin =

Pellegrin or Pellegrín is a last name. Notable people with this last name include:

- Carlos Pellegrín (born 1958), Chilean Roman Catholic bishop
- César Pellegrín (born 1979), Uruguayan association football player
- Élise Pellegrin (born 1991), Maltese-French alpine skier
- François Pellegrin (1881–1965), French botanist
- Jacques Pellegrin (1873–1944), French zoologist
- Jacques Pellegrin (painter) (1944–2021), French painter
- Mattia Pellegrin (born 1989), Italian cross-country skier
- Maurizio Pellegrin (born 1956), Italian/American visual artist
- Paolo Pellegrin (born 1964), Italian photojournalist
- Raúl Pellegrin (1958–1988), Chilean guerilla leader
- Raymond Pellegrin (1925–2007), French actor
- Simon-Joseph Pellegrin (1663–1745), French poet, playwright, and opera librettist

== See also ==
- Gino de Pellegrín (1926–2004), Argentine alpine skier
- Oscar De Pellegrin (born 1963), Italian Paralympic archer
- Pellegrin's barb, an African species of cyprinid fish
