= Christopher C French =

American artist

Christopher C French (born 1957) is an American painter and art critic. His work has been exhibited nationally, and is included in collections of the Goethe-Institut, the Hirshhorn Museum and Sculpture Garden, McNeese State University, Museum of Fine Arts Houston, the Smithsonian American Art Museum, and the Phillips Collection, as well as the corporate collections of Hewlett-Packard, Progressive, and Sallie Mae, Inc.

== Early life and education ==
Born in St. Louis, Missouri in 1957, French grew up in Sacramento, receiving his BA from the University of California, Davis, where he studied with Robert Arneson and Wayne Thiebaud.

== Career ==
After graduation, French focused on performance, joining the Royal Lichtenstein Quarter Ring Sidewalk Circus for a yearlong, 41 state, 200-performance tour. Resettling in Oakland in 1981, he returned to painting, working in a representational style inspired by the work of Philip Guston, and joined the staff at Art Week magazine, founded and edited by Cecile McCann, where he contributed critical reviews, essays, and opinion pieces. His approach to painting changed after moving to New York in 1986 when he found a book of Braille paper on the street, which he incorporated into his work. . He moved to Washington, DC in 1998. His first exhibition in Washington was presented in 1992, Constellations & Fables at Marsha Mateyka Gallery in Washington, DC, accompanied by a catalogue with an essay by David Pagel. He continued to exhibit regularly at Mateyka Gallery through 2011.. In 1994, French joined the board of the Washington Project for the Arts and stepped in as Interim Director until 1996 .. He later moved to Houston, Texas, (2000–2008) where he exhibited at Devin Borden Gallery and to Southampton, New York (2008–2025), exhibiting at the Mark Humphrey Gallery the Drawing Room and the Islip Art Museum.

In addition to his work as contributing editor for Art Week (1982–1987) French has published as an essayist and critic in numerous art magazines, and has contributed essays to several museum publications. Catalogue essays include Robin Rose: Painting as Prototype (M-13 Gallery, 1995); Louise Bourgeois: The Locus of Memory (Brooklyn Museum) and Harry Abrams, Inc., 1994); The Human Factor (Albuquerque Museum, 1993); Beyond the Frame (Institute for Contemporary Art, Tokyo, 1991) and 20 Years, Martha Jackson-Jarvis: Structuring Energy, (Maryland Art Place, Baltimore, 1996). From 2000 to 2001 he edited the reviews section of Art Lies, The Journal of Art (1988–1991), and Artnet.com (1999–2000). He has contributed art reviews, interviews, and news reports to ARTnews, Flash Art, and the online magazine Glasstire. He was the editor of the book Facing History: The Black Image in American Art 1710-1940 published in 1990, and a contributing essayist for Radical Seafaring (2016) and Telling Stories: Reframing the Narrative (2021) both published by the Parrish Art Museum. He served as President of the United States chapter of the Association of International Art Critics (AICA) from 2012 to 2014.

== Selected works ==
- Tracing Red While Waiting for Tomorrow, June 6, 2007 (2007) Braille paper with oil and acrylic on wood panel, 21 1/16 × 20 3/8 in. (53.5 × 51.8 cm) Museum of Fine Arts Houston.
- Dislocation Suite, (1995) six panels, chine collé, intaglio, screen-print, and monotype on paper, 13 x 11 in. (33.0 x 27.9 cm) Smithsonian American Art Museum.,
- Vital Statistics.CF (1998) Oil on photograph mounted on wood panel, 22 x 18 in. (55.9 x 45.7 cm) Hirshhorn Museum and Sculpture Garden, Washington, DC.
- Setting (1994) Oil on braille paper mounted on canvas, 41 1/2 in x 43 1/2 in. (105.41 cm x 110.49 cm) The Phillips Collection, Washington, DC.

Selected Bibliography

- Romanov Grave, " Christopher French, an Interview with Janet Golas," September 10, 2016.
- Meredith Deliso, "Capsule Art Reviews," Houston Press, April 11, 2012.
- Rogers, Pat. "Artist Christopher French Draws on the Power of Tension." Southampton Press, August 18, 2009.
- Harrison, Helen, When Words Become A Means of Reaching a Different Plane," The New York Times, March 28, 1999.
- Smith, Matthew, "Visual/Language: A Q & A with Christopher French," New American Paintings, 1999
- Protzman, Ferdinand, She Has Her Data's Eyes," Washington Post, October 29, 1998.
- Protzman, Ferdinand, "Remote Talent Close at Hand," Washington Post, November 13, 1997.
- Pagel, David, "Redefining the Borders..." Los Angeles Times, November 14, 1996.
- Pagel, David, Collections and Fables, Marsha Mateyka Gallery, Washington, DC. 1992.

Selected articles and books by Christopher French

- "Against the Proposition that 'Art is Art and Everything Else is Everything Else,'" Artists on Art/Ad Reinhardt, Brooklyn Rail, May 2013.
- "7 Questions for Josef Helfenstein," Glasstire, May 2, 2004.
- Elizabeth Strong-Cuevas Sculpture, Marisa Del Re Gallery, 1991.
- L.C. Armstrong: Paintings," Galerie Hubner, 2005.

== Awards ==
- National Endowment for the Arts Fellowship 1993.
- Cité Internationale des Arts Residency Grant, Paris 1996.
- Joan Mitchell Foundation Fellowship Award 1999.

== Personal life ==
Christopher French married Terrie Sultan in 1988. They currently live in Santa Rosa, CA.
