= Jennifer Bartlett =

American painter (1941–2022)

- 'Houses', serigraph by Bartlett, 2005
- Born: Jennifer Losch; March 14, 1941; Long Beach, California, U.S.
- Died: July 25, 2022 (aged 81); Amagansett, New York, U.S.
- Education: Mills College; Yale School of Art and Architecture
- Known for: Painting, Sculpture, Writing

Jennifer Bartlett (née Losch; March 14, 1941 – July 25, 2022) was an American artist and novelist. She was best known for paintings and prints that combine the system-based aesthetic of conceptual art with the painterly approach of Neo-Expressionism. Many of her pieces were executed on small, square, enamel-coated steel plates that are combined in grid formations to create very large works.

== Early life and education ==
Bartlett was born Jennifer Losch in 1941 in Long Beach, California, one of four children. Her father owned a construction company, and her mother was a fashion illustrator who left the field to raise her children. She grew up in the suburbs of Long Beach, close enough to the ocean that she developed an affinity for water, which would reappear in her mature work. She attended Mills College in Oakland, California, graduating with a BA in 1963. During her college years, she met Elizabeth Murray, who became a lifelong friend. She then moved to New Haven to study at the Yale School of Art and Architecture at a time when minimalism was the dominant style. She studied with Josef Albers, Jack Tworkov, Jim Dine, and Richard Serra, receiving her MFA in 1965.

Bartlett described the experience of study at Yale as her broadest influence: "I'd walked into my life". In a 2005 interview with the painter Elizabeth Murray, she gave this list of things that she said had been on her mind as a first-year art student:

Being an artist, Ed Bartlett, Bach cello suites, Cézanne, getting into graduate school, getting to New York, Albert Camus, James Joyce. I'd drawn constantly since childhood: large drawings of every creature alive in the ocean; Spanish missions with Indians camping in the foreground, in the background Spanish men throwing cowhides over a cliff to a waiting ship; hundreds of Cinderellas on five-by-eight pads, all alike but with varying hair color and dresses.

Among Bartlett's early influences were Arshile Gorky, Piet Mondrian, and Sol LeWitt; particularly LeWitt's Paragraphs on Conceptual Art.

== Work ==
House with Open Door, oil on canvas, wood paint and steel, Honolulu Museum of Art

Element from the Swimmers Atlanta at the Russell Federal Building & U.S. Courthouse, Atlanta, Georgia, 2009

Bartlett was best known for her paintings and prints in which familiar subjects — ranging from houses and gardens to oceans and skies — are executed in a style that combines elements of both representational and abstract art; indeed, she commented that she did not accept a distinction between figurative and abstract art. LeWitt's "rules" for conceptual art and the exactitude of LeWitt's method and his definitive use of programmatic strategies and forms is manifest in her life-long devotion to geometric form. She often worked in serial form or created polyptychs, and she frequently devised rule systems that guide the variations within a given group of works, requiring viewers to focus on "perception, on process, on the effect of shifting perspective— and on the leaps that take place in our minds no matter how rational we may think we are". In the late 1960s, influenced by the work of John Cage, she started bringing chance elements into her work.

Her realistic works favored mundane subjects, such as modest houses. Her installations often consisted of multiple canvases as well as three dimensional objects. House with Open Door from 1988, in the collection of the Honolulu Museum of Art, consists of an oil paint on canvas diptych and the same house constructed out of wood. The Dallas Museum of Art, the Honolulu Museum of Art, the Los Angeles County Museum of Art, the Metropolitan Museum of Art, the Museum of Fine Arts, Houston, the Museum of Modern Art (New York City), the Philadelphia Museum of Art, the San Francisco Museum of Modern Art, the Tate Modern, and the Whitney Museum of American Art (New York City) are among the public collections holding her work.

Most critics perceived Bartlett's work as inventive, energetic, wide-ranging, and ambitious, and she was considered one of the two best painters of the postminimalism generation. One writer noted that a central paradox of her work was that Bartlett took the controlled, rationalist grid often favored by conceptual artists and used it to release an evocative torrent of imagery that was much in common with the Neo-Expressionist work of the 1980s. A few critics found her work shallow, overly focused on surface, and weakened by its eclecticism. She had several retrospectives and survey exhibitions, the first in 1985 originating at the Brooklyn Museum (New York) and with more recent ones in 2011 at the Museum of Modern Art (New York) and 2014 at the Parrish Art Museum (New York). Her work was included in the 2024 exhibition Making Their Mark: Works from the Shah Garg Collection at the Berkeley Art Museum and Pacific Film Archive (BAMPFA).

=== Early experimental work ===
Early on, Bartlett made a number of three-dimensional works that she subjected to extreme conditions such as freezing and smashing. She also realized that she wanted something to draw on that was erasable but gridded like the graph paper that she and many other conceptual artists were using at the time. She came up with what is now one of her signature materials: foot-square steel plates with a plain white baked enamel surface on which was silkscreened a quarter-inch grid. She had these fabricated in large quantities, and later worked with other sizes as well.

=== Rhapsody (1975–76) ===
With her earliest well-known work, Rhapsody, Bartlett reinvented the mural form for Conceptual art. Rhapsody is a painting executed on 987 foot-square enamel-coated steel tiles arranged in a grid 7 plates tall by roughly 142 wide, extending across multiple walls. The subject matter consists of variations on what Bartlett felt were the basic elements of art: four universal motifs (house, tree, ocean, mountain), geometric forms (line, circle, triangle, square), and color (25 shades). The seven sections are entitled "Introduction", "Mountain", "Line", "House", "Tree", "Shape", and "Ocean".

Rhapsody has been called an "extended portable mural" and a "post-painting painting" that "took the American art world by storm". According to critic Roberta Smith, Rhapsody is an epic achievement that brought together elements of photorealism, geometric abstraction, and pattern painting while also prefiguring 1980s Neo-Expressionism. It is so large that Bartlett commented that she never saw the piece as a whole until its first public exhibition. Bartlett said of Rhapsody that it "opened the wall up instead of closing it down. It looks bigger than it really is.... It's my way of making edgeless paintings." It has been acquired by the Museum of Modern Art (New York). Subsequent series such as In the Garden and Amagansett have become more painterly while still retaining their systematizing rigor.

=== At Sea, Japan (1980) ===
In 1980, Bartlett began to work on a complex print project in collaboration with master printers in Japan. The result was At Sea, Japan, a waterscape printed on paper whose 6 panels span 8 feet in width. The image is built up from 96 screenprints and 86 color woodcuts.

=== In the Garden series (1979–83) ===
In the Garden is a series of over 200 drawings (and later paintings and prints) that all take as their subject the garden behind a villa in Nice, France, where Bartlett stayed in the winter of 1979–1980. Bartlett used a few major motifs — an old swimming pool, a statue of a urinating boy, a row of cypresses — to explore perspective, scale, and changing light conditions. The drawings range from pencil sketches to pastels and gouaches executed in a range of styles, and many are diptychs or triptychs. She later made her backyard garden in Brooklyn, New York, the focus of a similar series of diptychs.

=== Sea Wall (1985) ===
With Sea Wall, Bartlett brought together oil painting and sculpture. The piece consists of a large painting of houses and boats on a dark ground, in front of which are placed sculptural versions of those same objects.

=== Digital painting (1987) ===
In 1987, the BBC invited Bartlett as one of six international artists, including David Hockney and Sidney Nolan, to work digitally on a Quantel Paintbox. The series was called Painting With Light and, though she was at first reluctant, she grew to enjoy her first attempt at digital painting and discussed the implications of this new medium as she worked.

=== Air: 24 Hours (1991-92) ===
A collaboration between Bartlett and the fiction writer Deborah Eisenberg, Air: 24 Hours first appeared as a book of 24 paintings by Bartlett with accompanying text by Eisenberg. Each paintings shows a scene in Bartlett's house at a particular hour of the day.

=== Amagansett series (2007–08) ===
Around 2004, she began including fragments of text — phrases, bits of dialogue, dreams — in some of her paintings. Amagansett is a series of oil paintings that take the ocean, skies, and seaside landscapes of Long Island as their subject. They are painted in a distinctive cross-hatched style in a limited palette favoring blues, greens, grays, and browns. Some pieces are diptychs in which Bartlett explores the shifts visible in a landscape between two moments of time or seen from two slightly different angles of view.

=== History of the universe: A novel ===
After her first novel, Cleopatra I-IV (1971), published by The Poetry Project in an edition of 300 copies (unpaginated and unbound), Bartlett's massive experimental novel History of the universe: A novel was published by Nimbus Books on January 1, 1985. Like Andy Warhol's later published The Andy Warhol Diaries (1989) it is a book that mixes, with a surfeit of detail, stream-of-consciousness and traditional narrative; recounting a series of Bartlett's memories, impressions, and descriptions of family, art world individuals and conversations. Like Cleopatra I-IV, the book is divided into sections, and each is marked by one of Bartlett's photograph. It is both banal and colorful: sometimes representational, sometimes abstract. In it, Bartlett alternates between a first- and third-person voice to address and recount the subjects of family, marriage, career, friends, and death. Peter Schjeldahl, Ron Padgett, and other members of the poetry community that gathered at St. Mark's Church in-the-Bowery encouraged Bartlett to join them in reading her precise inventory of personal events and habits aloud, and she found an audience receptive to her literary minimal art work there.

An excerpt from History of the universe: A novel was included in the 2014 book Jennifer Bartlett: History of the Universe (1970-2011) that was published by Parrish Art Museum containing texts by Klaus Ottmann and Terrie Sultan.

=== Commissions ===
In 1981, Bartlett created Swimmers Atlanta, a 200-foot multimedia mural for the Federal Building in Atlanta, Georgia. Thereafter she completed commissions for Volvo, AT&T, Saatchi & Saatchi, Information Sciences Institute, and Battery Park.

== Personal life and death ==
After marrying medical student Ed Bartlett in 1964, she commuted between the Soho district of New York City and New Haven, where she taught at the University of Connecticut.

Following her 1972 divorce, Bartlett moved to New York City full-time and began teaching at the School of Visual Arts. In 1983, she married German actor Mathieu Carrière with whom she had a daughter, Alice Carrière, the author of the Spiegel & Grau memoir Everything/Nothing/Someone that recounts the author's challenging life in their household. They divorced in the early 1990s. She lived in both New York City and Paris. As of 2014, she resided full-time in Amagansett on Long Island. Bartlett died from acute myeloid leukemia at her home in Amagansett on July 25, 2022, aged 81.

== Selected exhibitions ==
- Paula Cooper Gallery, New York, 1976. Rhapsody.
- Whitney Museum of American Art, New York, 1978. New Image Painting.
- Clocktower Gallery, New York, 1979.
- Whitney Biennial, 1981.
- Walker Art Center, Minneapolis, MN, 1984.
- Brooklyn Museum, New York, 1985. 15 Year Retrospective. Touring retrospective.
- Walker Art Center, 1986. Touring exhibition.
- Orlando Museum of Art, 1993. Touring retrospective of prints.
- Locks Gallery, Philadelphia, 1994. Recent Works from the AIR: 24 Hours Series.
- Locks Gallery, Philadelphia, 2000. Islands and Oceans.
- Locks Gallery, Philadelphia, 2004. At Sea.
- Addison Gallery of American Art, 2006. Early Plate Work.
- Pace Gallery, New York, 2011. Recitative (2009–10).
- Locks Gallery, Philadelphia, 2011. The Studio Inside Out.
- Museum of Modern Art, New York, 2011. Rhapsody and other works.
- Locks Gallery, Philadelphia, 2012, Addresses (1976–1978)"
- Locks Gallery, Philadelphia, 2013, Chaos Theory
- Parrish Art Museum, 2014. Jennifer Bartlett: History of the Universe — Works 1970–2011. Touring survey.
- Locks Gallery, Philadelphia, 2015. In the Garden
- Paula Cooper Gallery, 2016.
- The Phillips Collection, 2024, In and Out of the Garden

== Honors and collections ==
Bartlett was a recipient of the 2019 Francis J. Greenburger Award. Bartlett received the American Academy and Institute of Arts and Letters Award in 1983 and the American Institute of Architects Award in 1986. She was elected into the National Academy of Design in 1990 and became a full member in 1994.

Bartlett's work is in the collections of the Metropolitan Museum of Art (New York), the Museum of Modern Art (New York), the Guggenheim Museum (New York), the Whitney Museum of American Art (New York), the National Gallery of Art (Washington, D.C.), the Tate Gallery (London), Benesse Museum (Naoshima) and other institutions.

Her image is included in the iconic 1972 poster Some Living American Women Artists by Mary Beth Edelson.
