= Rackstraw Downes =

British-born realist painter and author

Rackstraw Downes (born 1939) is a British-born realist painter and author. His oil paintings are notable for their meticulous detail accumulated during months of plein-air sessions, depictions of industry and the environment, and elongated horizontal compositions with complex perspective.

== Education ==
Born Rodney Harry Rackstraw Downes in Pembury, Kent, England, he moved to the United States and studied painting as an exchange student at The Hotchkiss School in Lakeville, Connecticut from 1957 to 1958. He then returned to England and attended Cambridge University, where he was at St John's College and received a Bachelor of Arts in English literature. Back in the United States, he studied at the Yale School of Art with Neil Welliver, Al Held and Alex Katz, and he received a Master of Fine Arts in painting in 1964. Originally an abstract painter, in 1966 Downes changed course and began working in the realist, plein-air style he is known for.

== Work ==
Downes' friendship with Welliver led to the purchase of a farm in Maine in 1964, where he began drawing the landscape, thus changing direction from the non-representational manner of his student work. In 1965 Downes moved to New York City. Over the next several years he taught at the University of Pennsylvania, Parsons School of Design, and later, at the Skowhegan School of Painting and Sculpture.

Though he is primarily based in New York City, where he has painted numerous cityscapes and urban scenes such as his series of four paintings, entitled "Four Spots Along a Razor-Wire Fence", Downes has traveled widely, creating a significant number of landscape paintings on site in Maine and Texas, of subjects including the harbor of Portland, Maine and the Donald Judd structures in Marfa, Texas. He has also painted interiors of a panoramic scale similar to his landscapes. Downes' paintings are characterized by their vastness of scope as much as their attention to detail: "they are composed of a fused sequence of visual observations, their horizontal lines 'bending' so as to acknowledge the Earth's curvature and the limitations of two-point perspective when applied to wide-angle views."

He has written for The New York Times, Art in America, Art News, The New Criterion, and other publications. He also edited Art In Its Own Terms: Selected Criticism, 1935–1975, a collection of Fairfield Porter's writing. Downes' own writing has been published in two small paperbacks: In Relation to the Whole, which features three essays; Under The Gowanus and Razor-Wire Journal, a documentation of his painting process; and in his own monograph, Rackstraw Downes.

Downes received a Guggenheim Fellowship in 1998. In 1999 he was inducted into the American Academy of Arts and Letters, and in 2009 he was awarded a MacArthur Fellowship 'genius award'. In 1982 he was elected into the National Academy of Design as an Associate member, and became a full Academician in 1994.

New York Times art critic Ken Johnson wrote that Downes "paints beautiful pictures of ugly places."

== Collections ==
Downes' work is held in public collections including the Museum of Modern Art and the Hirshhorn Museum and Sculpture Garden. He is represented by the Betty Cuningham Gallery in New York.

== Exhibitions ==
2010 Parrish Art Museum in Southampton, New York.

2010 Aldrich Contemporary Art Museum, Ridgefield, Connecticut.

2011 Weatherspoon Art Museum , Greensboro, North Carolina.

== Publications ==
- Schwartz, Sanford; Storr, Robert, and Downes, Rackstraw. Rackstraw Downes. Princeton University Press, April 2005
- Under the Gowanus and Razor-Wire Journal: The making of two paintings. 5.9.99 - 11.15.99. New York, Turning the Head Press, 2000
- In Relation to the Whole: Three Essays from Three Decades - 1973, 1981, 1996. New York, Edgewise Press, 2000
