= Noche Crist =

Noche Crist (née Maria Nicola Olga Ioan) (1909, Craiova, Romania – May 17, 2004, Washington, D.C.) was a Romanian American artist. Her eclectic mix of paintings, prints, installations and sculptures throughout her long life was unique.

== Life ==
Brought up by a delicate mother, Juliet, who suffered from ill health and her capricious aunt, Mamoutz, whose husband encouraged her to paint as a very young child, Noche survived two World Wars both in Bucharest and the Romanian countryside where the family had a small estate. She married Serban Grant in 1938 and divorced him in 1946. After leaving Bucharest in 1947, Crist continued to paint and write in Washington, D. C. using a complex iconography, much of it based on her life in Romania, until a few months before her death at the age of 95.

'Carpathian Ancestor', silkscreen by Noche Crist, Noche Crist Trust

In 1945, she met David Crist, an American Air Force officer assigned to the Allied Control Commission in Bucharest. He attended one of Noche’s art shows there, after buying one of her watercolors, he insisted on meeting the artist and they fell in love. As his fiancée, he arranged for her to travel to Washington from Bucharest, just prior to the Communists taking over the Romanian government, and they married in 1947.

Noche Crist accompanied her husband on his military assignments to Hawaii and various European countries while developing her distinctive artistic style with little or no formal training. She exhibited in Hawaii, Frankfurt, Paris and elsewhere before settling in Washington DC in 1963.

After several exhibitions in different venues, she co-founded Gallery 10 in 1974, and appeared there in both group and solo shows during the next two decades. The gallery became known for promoting and showcasing new artists under her influence.

'Carousel', silkscreen by Noche Crist, 1973, Noche Crist Trust

Working with acrylic paints on wooden cut-outs and transparent polyester resin small sculptures, Crist created images reminiscent of her childhood at her family's country estate, Ograda, near Ploiești. Her works depict dreamlike, surreal scenes of partially dressed women posing seductively in opulent, sometimes fantastical, settings. In other paintings and panels, she portrays bare-breasted women and felines sensually intertwined. Crist embraced silkscreen printmaking and experimented extensively with the medium. Her works gained a following among art patrons, including Olga Hirshhorn, one of Washington's leading art collectors.

In 1984, at Gallery 10 simultaneously with her autobiographical art exhibition based on her Memoires about her childhood and life in Romania, she published a catalogue of these stories. Again in 1986 at Gallery 10, she continued this format with Memoires Part II. When her beloved husband, retired Air Force Col. David Crist, died in 1988, she recovered from this loss with the help of a supportive circle of friends. Later, she continued writing her memoirs as the basis for short theatrical productions in 1989 with The Decadent Child and 1992 with The Ladders of Hell at the Washington Project for the Arts.

In 1995, the Washington Project for the Arts held a retrospective of 50 years of Mrs. Crist's work called "Noche Crist: Boudoirs and Lupanars," curated by Mokha Laget. In 2002, the Millennium Art Center in Washington opened an installation of her artwork called the "Pinck Room" (Noche thought this spelling looked more Romanian), a boudoir setting featuring her two- and three-dimensional artwork. Her last years were spent writing, drawing, and making small paintings at home where she had had a studio for over 40 years. Surrounded by a circle of devoted friends for whom she was a catalyst, she died peacefully at home. Mrs. Crist is buried next to her husband at Arlington National Cemetery.

In the summer of 2008 (May 27 through July 27), Independent Curator Vivienne M. Lassman presented the well-researched Noche Crist: A Romanian Revelation for the American University Museum at the Katzen Arts Center. Lassman recreated Noche’s pink boudoir installation in the center of this posthumous retrospective and incorporated edited video and audio DVDs of interviews with Crist and her friends.

Vollard Gallery of the House of Culture, Craiova exhibited a few selected works of Crist from the American University show as a tribute from the artist's birthplace in October 2008. The Art Museum of Craiova in 2014 accepted the donation from the Noche Crist estate of the multi-dimensional art works from the Katzen Arts Center exhibition and inaugurated a selection of those works in its restored Beaux Arts galleries in February 2017 entitled "From Noche with Love" which was well received by the Romanian community.

Gallery 2112 owned by Brandon Webster in Washington, DC in May 2018 installed the artist's works in a show entitled "Noche Crist: Fantastical Visions" curated by Vivienne Lassman. This consisted of silk screen and etched prints, resin statuettes (polyester prostitutes so named by the artist), cutouts and paintings and displayed salon style reminiscent of the way Noche hung her art in her home.

== Reviews ==
- Washington Post review of Romanian Revelation
- Washington Times review of Romanian Revelation
- American University's CAS Connections review of Romanian Revelation
