= Washington Project for the Arts =

Washington Project for the Arts (WPA) is an American non-profit arts organization founded in 1975, dedicated to the support and aid of artists in the Washington, D.C. area.

== Early history ==
Alice Denney, a contemporary art collector active on the Washington scene, founded the Washington Project for the Arts (WPA) in 1975 as a "service center" for area artists and performers. The WPA's mission was not simply to provide a place for artists to show their work or perform, but also to make available advice in arts management, grantsmanship, career development, and legal rights. Denney launched the WPA with a grant from the Eugene and Agnes E. Meyer Foundation, a tiny staff, a three-story building, and a lot of goodwill. The WPA officially opened in April 1975 with a multidisciplinary program that included a broad survey of Washington area visual art.

Denney stepped down as director in early 1979.

Al Nodal, hired by Denney, succeeded her as Director in April 1979. Nodal continued to emphasize the work of area artists, but he added more shows featuring out-of-towners. Nodal started the WPA bookstore, which featured an unusual selection of artists' books and launched a new program to encourage the production or artists books. To support his programs, Nodal landed major grants from the National Endowment for the Arts and the District of Columbia's Commission on the Arts and Humanities. In 1980, WPA held its first auction fundraiser. Nodal ended his directorship in 1983, after WPA's move out of its original 1227 G Street location.

The board hired Jock Reynolds in the summer of 1983, to replace Al Nodal as Director. The programming under Reynolds received regular coverage in the national art press, shifting WPA from primarily serving local artists to serving a national audience. This shift for the WPA was met with mixed feelings, some welcoming the national prestige, and others accustomed to WPA's mission to focus on local Washington, D.C., artists. Through his leadership, Reynolds launched an aggressive capital campaign in the spring of 1988 where he brought in generous support from the federal and local government, art foundations, individual donors, and more than eighty corporations or corporate foundations. This raised the bar for WPA, and to maintain its level of activity in the future, it would need to raise close to $1 million each year. In December 1989, Reynolds took a sabbatical and decided not to return to Washington, D.C.

John L. Moore III, who was already at the WPA, filled in as acting director, from August 1989 until the board hired Marilyn Zeitlin, a contemporary art curator, as executive director in May 1990. The budget for the fiscal year 1991 was set at around a million dollars, but Zeitlin was only able to raise a fraction of that amount.

The WPA continued to mount an impressive array of programs, but financial problems overwhelmed the organization. When Zeitlin left in May 1992, Don Russell, who had been on the WPA staff in the 1980s, was hired back. At that time, one of WPA's mainstays for financial support, the National Endowment for the Arts, was beginning to eliminate funding for artists spaces. In April 1995, Russell resigned. Christopher French, who had joined the Board in the fall of 1994, was asked by the trustees to assume the position of Interim Director to address the financial and programmatic challenges. In just three months, he reorganized the space, trimmed the budget, developed a new exhibition of local photographers, and mended fences with the local art community. With increased financial pressures mounting, French renegotiated the terms of the WPA's lease on their flagship building on 7th Street NW and closed its doors. By December 1995, WPA was almost bankrupt.

== 21st Century ==
With the support of the Board, French entered into discussions with the Corcoran Gallery of Art to explore an affiliation or merger between the two institutions. In 1996, a generous handful of board members and avid WPA supporters paid off the WPA's outstanding debts, wiping the slate clean. With the support of David C. Levy, the director of the Corcoran Gallery of Art, the Corcoran board of trustees, and members of the art community, the WPA's operations were transferred into the Washington Project for the Arts\Corcoran. The Corcoran would provide in kind support, including an office in the museum's curatorial department, equipment, technical assistance, and the like, but no direct financial support. Having put in motion what was considered the only option for the continuation of the WPA, French stepped down as interim director while remaining as chair of the board until January 1997.

In 1999, Marta Kuzma served as director. Kuzma's term attempted to redirect the program to address Washington, D.C., as a unique context for international contemporary art projects. She resigned in June 2001 after mounting friction with a Board more focused on serving the local community. After Kuzma's departure, Annie Adjchavanich was named director. While Adjchavanich was director, she ramped up programs for area artists and recruited new members. In March 2005, Adjchavanich left the WPA\C and Kim Ward, previously membership and finance director, was named acting director until August 2005, when hired as executive director.

Under the leadership of Kim Ward, the Washington Project for the Arts legally separated from the Corcoran Gallery of Art on December 31, 2007. The organization returned to full autonomy with an office and micro gallery space near Dupont Circle, ending the eleven-year partnership with the Corcoran Gallery of Art.

In 2008, the organization was a finalist for the Mayor's Award for Innovation in the Arts.

In 2009, Lisa J. Gold was announced as the new director. Under her leadership the WPA continued the growth and refocusing started by Kim Ward and conducted several key exhibitions and moved to a larger, permanent space. She left in 2016 and took a position at the Hirshhorn Museum and Sculpture Garden as director of public engagement.

In 2016, Peter Nesbett was announced as the new director. In 2023, Travis Chamberlain became director.

== The different spaces of WPA ==
When Alice Denney founded the WPA in 1975, she was lucky to snare a rundown building at 1227 G Street, NW, Washington, DC from the city's Redevelopment Land Agency. The rent was only $1 a year. Renovated on a shoestring budget, 1227 G Street included 5 galleries, a film screening room, a performing arts space, and offices. A small board, over half of whom were artists, advised the programming and exhibitions associated with the G street Space.

In 1982, 1227 G Street was sold to developers and WPA was evicted from its original location. Then director Al Nodal supervised WPA's move to the Jenifer Building in the 400 block of 7th Street, NW, Washington DC. Rent was no longer $1 per year, thus straining the WPA's resources considerably.

In 1985, only three years after the move from 1227 G Street to the Jenifer Building, the WPA's new home was sold again. The WPA relocated to 7th and E Streets, NW, to what had been a Kresge five and dime. Then director Jock Reynolds made a deal with the new owners of the Jenifer Building that would allow WPA to move back into the building after it was renovated. In December 1988, the WPA was able to move back into its improved 11,000 sq ft (1,000 m^{2}) space, all because of an aggressive fundraising campaign led by Reynolds.

In 1996, the WPA was supported by the Corcoran Gallery of Art and became the WPA\Corcoran. It moved its space into an office in the Corcoran's curatorial office. No longer with an exhibition space of its own, the WPA\C relied on collaborations and donations of space from other area arts organizations.

After separating from the Corcoran, the WPA moved to an office and micro gallery space at 2023 Massachusetts Avenue, near Dupont Circle.

In 2016 the WPA moved into its new home in the Atlantic Plumbing development, over the 9:30 Club north of the U Street Corridor.

== Notable exhibitions ==
In 1985, “Art in Washington and Its Afro-American Presence: 1940-1970,” featured DC resident artists Elizabeth Catlett, David Driskell, Lois Mailou Jones, James A. Porter, and Alma Thomas.

In June 1989, the Corcoran Gallery of Art canceled The Perfect Moment: Robert Mapplethorpe Photographs, which included (among other things) sexually explicit images involving gay BDSM, and two photos of children with exposed genitals. This was in the context of the culture wars of the late 1980s, when Sen. Jesse Helms, Rep. Dick Armey, among others, questioned grant funding for individual artists, from the National Endowment for the Arts, for art that they considered "morally reprehensible trash." Not wanting to let an important exhibition fall to the wayside, the underwriters of the show went to the WPA, who presented the controversial show in its own space from July 21 – August 13, 1989. 48,863 visitors, a standing record, attended the exhibition. There was a seminar about the historical impact 20 years later.

In the fall of 1989, The Blues Aesthetic exhibition was held.

In October through November 1995, it showed a retrospective of the artist Noche Crist, Romanian rhapsodies.

In December 1995, Hostile Witness was shown, by the artist, Shailish Thakor.

In the summer of 2005 the WPA\C organized one of its largest membership shows ever at the seven spaces that made up the Warehouse Galleries, Theater and Cafe complex on 7th Street, NW in Washington, D.C. Titled and curated by F. Lennox Campello, "Seven", the show included works by Sam Gilliam, Mark Jenkins, Frank Warren, Tim Tate, Chan Chao, and many other well-known DC area member artists.

In December 2005, WPA\C mounted PostSecret, a project founded by Frank Warren. In a donated space on M street in Georgetown, Washington, D.C., thousands of postcards that were sent into Warren were placed on display. The exhibition drew in large crowds, many whom waited in line to see the exhibit, and can be credited as the most successful exhibition since the Mapplethorpe show.

In 2006, it sponsored Wallsnatchers, an exhibition of graffiti art, at a vacant Staples building in Georgetown.

In 2009, major American art collector Mera Rubell of the Rubell Family Collection, selected and curated 36 Washington, D.C., area artists for a WPA exhibition at the American University Museum.

In May 2010, WPA collaborated with The Pink Line Project for Cabaret (re)Revolatire. This event, curated by Alberto Gaitán celebrated the historic Cabaret ReVoltaire series that was presented by WPA in 1992.

The WPA Biennial exhibition OPTIONS, features under-recognized and emerging artists from the mid-Atlantic region.

Past exhibitions and programs include, Wall Snatchers, The Experimental Media Series, The Hot House Video Series, Seven, Sculpture Unbound, Anonymous I, Anonymous Returns, Anonymous III, Conversions, Punk Festival, and many more.

WPA has collaborated with American University, The Ellipse Arts Center, Edison Place Gallery, Washington Sculptor's Group, District of Columbia Arts Center, Flashpoint, Corcoran Gallery of Art and College of Art & Design, Warehouse Arts Complex and Theater, Creative Alliance at The Patterson, Gallery5, and many others.

Its archives are held at the Smithsonian Archives of American Art.
