= Terrie Sultan =

American museum director

Terrie Sultan (born 28 October 1952) is an American independent curator and cultural consultant and Founding Principal of the boutique consulting firm Art Museum Strategies @ Hudson Ferris based in New York City. AMS @ Hudson Ferris combines the experience and expertise of an experienced former art museum director with a team of highly regarded, professional fundraising consultants to offer a broad range of services specifically tailored to art museums and cultural institutions, including strategic planning, crisis management, operational structures and organizational assessment, board governance, and curatorial expertise to peers in the field, as well as operational fundraising, feasibility studies, and development and oversight of capital and comprehensive campaigns in association with Hudson Ferris.

In addition to her work with AMS @ Hudson Ferris Sultan engages in independent curatorial and writing projects, including Beyond the Lens: Photorealist Perspectives on Looking, Seeing, and Painting for the Asheville Art Museum, on view September 8, 2023 to February 24, 2024 Journeys to Places Known and Unknown: Moving Images by Janet Biggs and peter campus for the Sarasota Art Museum, on view October 2022 through January 2023. She acted as Consulting Producer for the groundbreaking, multi-disciplinary performance project Can We Know the Sound of Forgiveness working in collaboration with Director and Producer Stephen Jimenez, artist James Drake, composer Gabrielle Ortiz, author Benjamin Saenz, artist Shaun Leonardo, multidisciplinary musician Alejandro Escuer, and curator Leila Hamidi. She is currently working as co-author for a memoire by the collector and gallerist Louis K. Meisel, the author, art dealer and proponent of the Photorealist art movement.

Sultan was appointed Director of the Parrish Art Museum in Water Mill, New York in April 2008. During her tenure as Director of the Parrish she oversaw the $33 million capital campaign and the design and construction of a new facility located in Water Mill, NY, designed by the Swiss architects Herzog & de Meuron. The Parrish broke ground on the project in July 2010 and opened the building to the public in November 2012. Sultan left her position in 2021 and launched AMS @ Hudson Ferris that same year.

== Biography ==
Sultan was raised in North Carolina. Her brother is the artist and printmaker Donald Sultan, based in New York City and Sag Harbor, New York.

She served in the Peace Corps, stationed in Apia, Samoa (1977). assisting in the establishment of the newspaper Tautai.

Previously she has served in senior positions at the New Museum of Contemporary Art in New York as Director of Public Affairs and Public Programs (1986–1988), the Corcoran Gallery of Art in Washington, DC, as Curator of Contemporary Art (1988–2000), and as Director and Chief Curator of the Blaffer Art Museum at the University of Houston (2000–2008). She has organized more than 40 exhibitions in her career, including Thomas Joshua Cooper: Refuge, From Lens to Eye to Hand: Photorealism 1969 to Today, Chantal Akerman: Moving through Time and Space, and Jessica Stockholder: Kissing the Wall, and Chuck Close Prints: Process and Collaboration.

She married artist Christopher French in 1988.

== Publications ==
Sultan has published over 45 items, including books:

- Rod Penner: Paintings, 1987–2022 (2023)
- Journeys to Places Known and Unknown (2023)
- Thomas Joshua Cooper: Refuge (2019)
- Renata Aller: Mountain Interval (2018)
- Keith Sonnier: Until Today (2018)
- From Lens to Eye to Hand: Photorealism 1969 to Today (2017)
- Gursky: Landscapes (2016)
- Dan Rizzie (with Mark Smith, 2015)
- Jennifer Bartlett 1970–2011 (with Jennifer Bartlett and Klaus Ottmann, 2013)
- Alice Aycock Drawings (with Jonathan Fineberg, 2013)
- Chantal Akerman (with Claudia Schmuckli, 2008)
- Populence (with David Pagel, 2008)
- Damaged Romanticism: A Mirror of Modern Emotion (with David Pagel, 2008)
- Jean Luc Mylayne (with Lynne Cooke, 2007)
- Katrina Moorhead (with Claudia Schmuckli, 2007)
- Tam van Tran: Psychonaut (2006)
- Urs Fischer: Mary Poppins (with Claudia Schmuckli, 2006)
- James Surls: the Splendora Years 1977–1997 (2005)
- Jane and Louise Wilson: Erewhon (2005)
- Dugout (contributor, 2005)
- Timothy App; a Selection of Works 1998–2005 (2005)
- Alain Bublex: Plug-In City (2005)
- Chuck Close Prints: Process and Collaboration (with Richard Shiff, 2003)
- American Treasures of the Corcoran Gallery of Art (with Sarah Cash, 2000)
- Kerry James Marshall (Harry N. Abrams Inc., New York, 2000)
- Donald Lipski: A Brief History Of Twine (with Donald Lipski, 2000)
- Collection in Focus: Dennis Oppenheim (1999)
- Ida Applebroog: Nothing Personal (with Ida Applebroog, 1998)
- The Forty-Fifth Biennial: The Corcoran Collection 1907–1998 (contributor, 1998)
- New American Paintings – Juried Exhibitions In Print – April 1998 (1998)
- Ken Aptekar: Talking To Pictures (with Ken Aptekar, 1997)
- Petah Coyne: Black/White/Black (with Carrie Przybilla, 1996)
- Painting Outside Painting (1995)
- Nick Kemps (1995)
- Louise Bourgeois 1982–1993 (with Louise Bourgeois and Charlotte Kolik, 1994)
- 43rd Biennial Exhibition of Contemporary American Paintings (with Christopher French, 1993)
- Maurizio Pellegrin (with Maurizio Pellegrin, 1992)
- Interface: Berlin Art in the Nineties (contributor, 1992)
- 42nd Biennial Exhibition of Contemporary American Paintings (with Christopher French, 1991)
- William T. Wiley (with Christopher French, 1991)
- Joyce Scott (with Joyce Scott, 1991)
- The Pervasiveness of Memory (1991)
- Inability to Endure or Deny The World: Representation and Text in the Work of Robert Morris (1990)

== Achievements and honors ==
- Member of the International Association of Art Critics
- Served on the College Art Association’s award committee for Lifetime Achievement for Art Writing
- Founding board member of Etant donnés, the French-American Endowment for Contemporary Art
- Awarded a Chevalier in the Ordre des Arts et des Lettres by the Government of France (2003)
- Under her direction, the Parrish Art Museum constructed a new campus in Water Mill, New York.
