= Joe Zucker =

American artist (1941–2024)

Porthole #4 by Joe Zucker, 1981, acrylic, cotton batting, and Rhoplex on canvas, Honolulu Museum of Art

Joseph Irwin Zucker (May 21, 1941 – May 15, 2024) was an American artist. Born in Chicago, he received a B.F.A. from the Art Institute of Chicago in 1964 and an M.F.A., from the same institution in 1966.

His art was quirky and idiosyncratic, and most often related to the materials, such as cotton and plastic. His Porthole #4 from 1981, in the collection of the Honolulu Museum of Art, demonstrated his innovative use of unusual materials. The Art Institute of Chicago, the Carnegie Museum of Art (Pittsburgh, Pennsylvania), the Honolulu Museum of Art, the Mary and Leigh Block Museum of Art (Northwestern University, Illinois), the Modern Art Museum of Fort Worth (Fort Worth, Texas), the Museum of Modern Art (New York City), the Parrish Art Museum (Water Mill, New York), the Smithsonian American Art Museum (Washington D.C.), and the Walker Art Center (Minneapolis, Minnesota) are among the public collections holding work by Joe Zucker.

== Personal life ==
Zucker, who was Jewish, attended Chicago Sinai Congregation during his youth. He lived in New York City for years until he moved to East Hampton, New York, in the 1980s. He was a volunteer coach for the Bridgehampton School high school basketball team.

Zucker was married to Britta Le Va.

Zucker's health declined after a car accident in 2022. He died from multiple organ failure on May 15, 2024, at the age of 82.

== In media ==
Zucker appeared in a 2017 documentary about the Bridgehampton basketball team entitled Killer Bees, produced by Shaquille O'Neal.

He and Le Va featured in a 2021 episode of Heavyweight.
