= Donald Sultan =

American painter

Donald K. Sultan
- Born: 5 May 1951 (age 75); Asheville, North Carolina, United States
- Education: University of North Carolina at Chapel Hill, Art Institute of Chicago
- Known for: Painting, drawing, sculpture, printmaking
- Movement: pop art, abstract expressionism
- Spouse: Susan Sultan (m. 1975–2014)
- Partner: Ellen Lewis (after 2015)
- Awards: North Carolina Award for Fine Arts (2010); University of North Carolina's Doctoral degree, Honoris causa (2007); New York Academy of Art's Doctoral degree, Honoris causa (2001); Corcoran School of Art's Doctoral degree, Honoris causa (2000); National Endowment for the Arts Grant (1980)

Donald K. Sultan (born 1951) is an American painter, sculptor, and printmaker, particularly well known for large-scale still life paintings and the use of industrial materials such as tar, enamel, spackle and vinyl tiles. He has been exhibiting internationally in prominent museums and galleries, and his works are included in important museum collections all over the globe. Sultan is the recipient of numerous honors and awards for his artistic achievements.

== Early life and education ==
Donald Sultan was born in Asheville, North Carolina in 1951. Both of his parents were interested in the arts. His father was a tire company owner who painted abstract paintings as a hobby, and his mother, Phyllis actively pursued theatre. It was through his mother that Sultan developed an early interest in theatre. "I was acting and then I learned how to make theatrical sets and paint them," he recalled, "I did apprenticeships in different professional theaters." With his father's encouragement, however, Sultan chose to pursue art professionally, and he earned a BFA degree from the University of North Carolina at Chapel Hill in 1973 and an MFA from the Art Institute of Chicago in 1975. While still in school, Sultan grew dissatisfied with traditional methods of painting and began experimenting in technique, surface, and media, which eventually led him to use industrial tools and materials.

== Work ==
=== 1970s ===
After receiving an MFA degree from the Art Institute of Chicago, Donald Sultan moved to New York in 1975 to begin his career as an artist. At first he was supporting himself by helping other artists construct lofts during the day and painting at night. He soon got a full-time position as a handyman in an art gallery, a job that lasted until the gallery closed in 1978. In 1979, Sultan won a $2,500 Creative Artists Public Service Grant from the New York State Council on the Arts, and that money enabled him to work full-time on his art. "By then I had started to show at a couple of places and to sell enough work to keep going," he said.

Donald Sultan rose to prominence in the electrified atmosphere of New York's downtown renaissance in the late 1970s as part of the "New Image" movement. His first solo exhibition was mounted in 1977 at Artists Space in New York, followed by group shows at Mary Boone Gallery in 1978 and Whitney Biennial at the Whitney Museum of American Art in 1979.

=== 1980s ===
As Sultan's work started to attract media attention and receive critical acclaim, prominent galleries and museums around the world such as the Indianapolis Museum of Art and the New York Museum of Modern Art in 1981, and the Houston Museum of Contemporary Art also in 1981, began to include his paintings in their exhibitions. In 1987 alone, impressive solo exhibitions were mounted at the Chicago Museum of Contemporary Art, the Los Angeles Museum of Contemporary Art, the Modern Art Museum of Fort Worth, the Brooklyn Museum, and the Blum Helman Gallery in New York. Reviewing these exhibitions for The New York Times, art critic Roberta Smith wrote, "Mr. Sultan is nothing if not a master of physical density, of the well-built image and the well-carpentered painting. He seems particularly to love the way an implacable slab of material can be made to flip-flop into a classically perfect, illusionistic form..."

As Studio 54's co-founder Steve Rubell famously observed in 1985, "artists [were] becoming the stars of the 1980s, like the rock stars of the 1960s or the fashion designers of the 1970s," and this astute observation fully applied to Sultan. "In the late 1980s", writes Geraldine Fabricant in The New York Times, "Donald Sultan was riding high. He was represented by a prestigious gallery, some of his paintings were selling for more than $100,000 each." These paintings, explains the British art historian and author Ian Dunlop, "fall into two groups: the first group consists of bold, brightly colored pictures with well-defined shapes and crisp outlines forming a clear silhouette; the second group consists of dark, hard to read pictures full of menace and often inspired by disastrous industrial events such as warehouse fires, airplane crashes, and freight train derailments. In both cases the pictures make a strong, immediate visual statement."

Air Strike April 22, 1987 by Donald Sultan, 1987, Honolulu Museum of Art

Sultan was one of the first to employ a wide range of industrial tools and materials, particularly tar, in lieu of traditional brushes and paints. "Out of industrial materials such as vinyl tile, butyl robber, and spackling plaster Sultan builds pictures that release pleasing vibrations in the mind and the eye," notes Calvin Tomkins in The New Yorker. Sultan's frequent use of tar was influenced by his father's tire business, and his interest in the industrial world came from his formative years at the Art Institute of Chicago. "Donald Sultan continues to stretch the technical possibilities of his medium," observes Michael Brenson in The New York Times. "His images are fresh and direct in part because he approaches industrial materials as if they were tubes of paint, feeling free to use anything as long as he uses it directly, in the form in which he finds it." In that regard, Sultan said that he "felt more comfortable working with the materials." "My father was a physical person", he explained, "I just felt most comfortable making things and moving things. Part of the whole American experience I came out of was the empire building mentality — physical labor. My grandfather was on the assembly lines of Detroit in the Depression. It was the way it was."

Sultan's imagery was simultaneously abstract and representational, and as he was exploring the boundary between the abstract and the everyday, he moved from the industrial subjects to the natural world, creating paintings and drawings of fruits and flowers – lemons and tulips, pomegranates and poppies. Of these works, art critic Vivien Raynor wrote in The New York Times, "Beneath these curmudgeonly surfaces there beats a romantic sensibility that is profoundly stirred by nature." Although Sultan's subject matter varies, his still lifes share formal similarities of volume, texture and richness. He is best known for his lemons and fruit, and states that his subjects develop from previous work. The oval of his lemons has led to a series of oval-blossomed tulips. Dots from dice have become oranges. What does not change is the statement Sultan's images make. His work incorporates basic geometric and organic forms with a visual purity that is both subtle and monumental. His images are weighty, with equal emphasis on both negative and positive areas. Sultan's still lifes are studies in contrast. "Most of my ideas were to put imagery back into abstract painting," explains Sultan of his artistic inspiration. "Some of the ones that look the most abstract are actually the most realistic."

His sensual, fleshy object representations are rendered through a labor-intensive and unique method. Instead of canvas, Sultan works on Masonite covered with 12-inch vinyl floor tiles. "He glues linoleum vinyl floor tile to plywood," explains art critic Michael Brenson in The New York Times, "then he covers the tile with tar. When it dries, he draws on it. In some places he scrapes the tar away and allows the tile to show through. Elsewhere, he cuts the tar away and fills in sections with plaster. The plaster and tile may or may not be painted. The color often retains the gloss and unnatural lushness of the Polaroid photographs Sultan takes after he decides the still-life arrangement. The results are surprising and hip. The still lifes may not literally contain apples and oranges, but they do mix together very different, seemingly incompatible elements... Positive and negative, charred and pristine, ripeness and decay all nestle together..."

Sultan's use of industrial materials in this way is striking and innovative, and Vivien Raynor has made this point in The New York Times stating that "Donald Sultan is descended from the Process artists of the late 1960s in that he makes art out of materials that are very much a part of contemporary life. Yet even as his coeval, Julian Schnabel, has cornered plates as a medium, Sultan seems to have been the first to work in tar, combining it with spackle and latex on a ground consisting of vinyl tiles attached to Masonite." It is through the use of these industrial materials, as well as through the deconstruction of his subjects into basic forms, that Sultan's paintings are enriching and elevating the still-life tradition. He is exploring the medium further through techniques of gouging, sanding, and buffing to create flatness, depth, gloss, and texture. The paintings are made of the same materials as the building in which the viewer stands; the architecture participates in the paintings. Weighty and structured, they are minimal and expressionist at the same time, while his images contradict their common association with fragility. "Sultan pushes the boundaries of painting as he virtually sculpts the painting into pictures that are minimal but opulently rich," notes columnist R. Couri Hay, a former editor of Andy Warhol's Interview Magazine in his 2011 profile of Sultan for the Hamptons Magazine. The process of making these painting, suggests The New York Times, is technically so complex and, consequently, so painstakingly slow, that finishing "a single painting can take up to a month, so that Mr. Sultan's annual output is 12 to 18 paintings."

The format of Sultan's paintings is almost always dictated by the tiles: one-foot squares, eight-foot squares, or most recently, four and eight-foot squares. Michael Brenson has referred to the smallest ones as "cunning little still lifes" and suggested that "the immediate effect is that of a detail in a Spanish Old Master painting isolated and blown up, or a detail in a fresco that has just been cleaned." The larger compositions, huge pieces of fruit, flowers, dominoes, buttons and other objects, set against the stark, unsettling tar black, eight foot square background, have a different effect and dominate the viewer. Sultan describes these works as "heavy structure, holding fragile meaning with the ability to turn you off and turn you on at the same time." Air Strike April 22, 1987 is one of the artist's "Disaster Pictures" that uses Latex and tar on Vinyl composition tile to convey the horrors of the Sri Lankan Civil War.

In addition to his paintings, Sultan has had success as a draftsman, printmaker and sculptor. As a printmaker, his scope of work includes lithography, serigraphy, wood cut, linocut, and etching. His large size aquatint etchings are particularly complex technically, and many have been exhibited in museums all over the globe, including in May, 2014, at the Bibliothèque nationale de France in Paris. On his graphic work, Sultan was among a small group of influential American artists who frequently collaborated with Picasso's master-printer Aldo Crommelynck. "[Sultan's etchings] emulate soft-edge charcoal drawings,' observed Suzanne Muchnic in the Los Angeles Times. "To do them, Sultan worked out a method of blowing and brushing resin powder on a printing plate before heating it. For the outsized lemons, he blew through long tubes and blurred edges of shapes with delicate Japanese brushes. The results are wonders of printmaking that retain the surface interest of drawings."

As a draftsman, Sultan remains devoted to his imagery of nature. His silhouetted charcoal drawings on paper, as well as his compositions in color conte crayon and flock, often explore the forms of fruits and flowers, resulting in largely monochromatic and prominent images. His flowers float and cluster together, pushing the edges of the paper and creating images that are bold and at times appear erotic and surreal. "I have been using flower imagery for 40 years," he says, "only because in the 1970s, I started to see the urban environment as a source for new growth. At the time, no one in my generation was painting flowers; now, of course, everyone is."

Just like in his paintings, Sultan continues to combine industrial materials in many of his sculptures. His love of nature is manifested in his sculptures in an unexpected way – the heavy, multi-ton lead Rain Pots installed in an open space contain rain water and appear fragile, serene and ephemeral. Other materials used by Sultan in his sculptural work include iron, wood, and painted aluminum.

Sultan has also produced limited edition artist's books. In 1989, he collaborated with David Mamet on his book Warm and Cold and in 1999, on Bar Mitzvah, a limited edition book for which he created a series of drawings.

=== 1990s ===
In 1997, Sultan collaborated with author and artist Michael McKenzie and poet Robert Creeley on the landmark book "Dark Poetics", a hand silkscreened oversized volume featuring dozens of his paintings. He has subsequently done a book of prints with the Israel-based print publishers Har-el, and done prints in collaboration with the Benefit Print Project supporting such cultural institutions as the Parrish Art Museum in Southampton, New York, the Atlantic Center for the Arts in New Smyrna Beach, Florida, the Tel Aviv Museum of Art, and the Adrienne Arsht Center for the Performing Arts. Sultan's artist's books are included in museum collections worldwide.

=== 2000s ===
In 2008, Donald Sultan, The Theater of the Object, a monograph, was published by the Vendome Press, New York. The large-scale hardcover volume includes 300 illustrations as well as essays by art historian and author Carter Ratcliff and Virginia Museum of Fine Arts curator John B. Ravenal.

== Solo exhibitions and museum collections ==
Since 1977, Sultan has shown work in galleries in France, Japan, the Russian Federation, Switzerland, the United Kingdom and the United States.

Sultan has had solo museum exhibitions at the Houston Museum of Contemporary Art, the Chicago Museum of Contemporary Art, the Los Angeles Museum of Contemporary Art, the Modern Art Museum of Fort Worth, the Brooklyn Museum, the New York Museum of Modern Art, and in 2009, "Donald Sultan: the First Decade," at the Cincinnati Contemporary Arts Center, to name a few. His works are in the permanent collections of over 50 major museums throughout the world, including the Honolulu Museum of Art, the New York Museum of Modern Art, the Solomon R. Guggenheim Museum, the New York Metropolitan Museum of Art the Virginia Museum of Fine Arts, the Boston Museum of Fine Arts, the Whitney Museum of American Art, the San Francisco Museum of Modern Art, the Portland Museum of Art, the Dallas Museum of Art, the Museum of Contemporary Art (MOCA), Los Angeles, the Los Angeles County Museum of Art, the Reina Sofia in Madrid, the Tate Modern in London, the National Museum of Modern Art in Tokyo, and the Centre Georges Pompidou in Paris, among others.

== Public commissions ==
In 1998, Sultan accepted a commission for an Absolut Vodka iconic art ad campaign, which began in the early 1980s when Andy Warhol created Absolut's first commissioned artwork. Sultan's ad shows a rough square filled with a screenprint of pimiento stuffed green olives, with a black and white aquatint image of the Absolut bottle boldly superimposed over the center of the artwork.

In 1999, Sultan was invited to have a permanent exhibition of his works in various media at the trendy new hotel in Budapest, Hungary that was scheduled to open in the fall of 2000. Aptly named Art'otel Budapest Donald Sultan, it was practically turned over to Sultan with a carte blanche to design everything from the fountains, to the carpeting and terry-cloth bathrobes. "I thought everybody should have a sculpture in their room," Sultan said of his hotel design, "and playful red carpeting with a needle-and-thread motif that supposedly hearkens back to Hungary's history as a tapestry-making capital." Sultan even designed the hotel's dishes and matchboxes, which bear images from his Smoke Rings series. According to the hotel's official website, Sultan's "art is displayed in every hotel room at Art'otel Budapest... and the hotel is exhibiting "an unprecedented collection of his works in a museum-like permanent exhibition, offering guests the unique opportunity to submerge themselves into Sultan's work and to rediscover painting with him." All four historical buildings of the hotel are "furnished with Sultan's original works. In the hotel's 165 rooms and suites, as well as in the hallways, guests will find 579 works, offering a comprehensive overview of Sultan's oeuvre." The hotel also invites its guests "to trace the innovations Sultan introduced, opening up new directions to painting."

== Speaking engagements ==
Since 1982, Donald Sultan has been actively participating in various educational institutions' Visiting Artist Programs. He has also been speaking and teaching regularly at museums and universities on both sides of the Atlantic. Sultan's speaking engagements included Harvard and Cornell universities in 1986, the Chicago Museum of Contemporary Art in 1987, the New York Museum of Modern Art in 1988, the Hirshhorn Museum in 1989, the New York University and the Metropolitan Museum of Art in 1993, the Detroit Institute of Arts in 1994, the Corcoran Museum of Art in 1995, the University of Michigan and the Boston University in 2001, the Smithsonian Institution and the Museum of Contemporary Art, Helsinki, Finland in 2003, the Singapore Tyler Print Institute, Singapore in 2004, the Modern Art Museum of Fort Worth in 2009, and American Federation of Arts in 2011, among others.

== Awards and honors ==
- Creative Artists Public Service Grant, New York, NY (1979)
- National Endowment for the Arts Visual Artist Fellowship (1980)
- Distinguished Alumnus Award, University of North Carolina (1992)
- Honorary doctorate degree, Corcoran School of Art, Washington, D.C. (2000)
- Honorary doctorate degree, New York Academy of Art, NY (2002)
- Honorary doctorate degree, University of North Carolina, Asheville (2007)
- North Carolina Award for the Arts (2010)
- Lifetime Achievement Award, Houston Fine Art Fair, Houston, TX (2011)

== Personal life ==
Donald Sultan was married once. His wife Susan Sultan, née Reynolds, was also from Asheville, North Carolina, and they moved to New York together in 1975. The marriage ended in divorce. He has two children – a daughter Frances and a son Penn as well as two grandchildren Georgia and Ada. Sultan spends time between his spacious loft in Tribeca, a historic 1760 house in Sag Harbor, Long Island, which he bought in 1984, and a Paris apartment on the fashionable Rue Marbeuf, just off the Champs Elysees.

== Selected works ==
- Plant, May 29, 1985 (1985); Latex, tar, and fabric on vinyl tile mounted on fiberboard, 96 by 96 inches (240 by 240 centimetres) Hirshhorn Museum, Washington D.C.
- Accident July 15, 1985 (1985); Latex and tar on tiles mounted on Masonite panels; 96 by 96 inches (240 by 240 centimetres) Metropolitan Museum of Art, New York.
- Firemen, March 6, 1985 (1985); Latex and tar on vinyl tile over Masonite; 96 1/2 x 96 1/2 inches (245.1 x 245.1 cm) Museum of Fine Arts, Boston.
- Warm and Cold (1985); Letterpress, lithograph, and color photographs; 21 1/16 x 17 1/16 in. (53.499 x 43.339 cm) Dallas Museum of Art
- Lemon and Egg, 1986 (1986); Charcoal on paper; 60 in × 48 in (150 cm × 120 cm) Albright-Knox Art Gallery.
- Air Strike April 22, 1987 (1987), Latex and tar on vinyl tile over Masonite, Honolulu Museum of Art
- Hermés Folding Knife (1997); Cahrcoal and gold leaf on paper; 15 by 16.5 inches (38 by 42 centimetres) Centre Georges Pompidou, Paris, France.
- Black Eggs and Roses May 22, 2000 (2000); Woodcut, paper pulp, dye and acrylic paint on paper; 68.9 by 68.1 inches (175 by 173 centimetres) Tate Modern, London, U.K.
- Red Poppies: April 14, 2003 (2003); Enamel, flocking, tar, and spackle on tile over Masonite; 76 ½ x 38 inches (194.3 x 96.5 cm) Pennsylvania Academy of the Fine Arts Museum, Philadelphia.

== Bibliography ==
- Carter Ratcliff. Donald Sultan: Theater of the Object. New York: Vendome Press, 2008. ISBN 978-0865651920
- Blagg, Max. Sultan, Donald.Smoke Rings. University of Michigan Museum of Art, 2001. ISBN 978-1930561069
- Sultan, Donald. Mamet, David. Madoff, Steven Henry. Donald Sultan: In the Still-Life Tradition. Exhibition Catalog. Memphis, Tennessee: Memphis Brooks Museum of Art, 2000. ISBN 0-915525-06-2
- Mamet, David. Bar Mitzvah. New York: Diane Publishing Co, 1999. ISBN 0-7567-6490-4
- Walker, Barry. Donald Sultan: A Print Retrospective. Rizzoli, 1992. ISBN 978-0847815913
- Sergeant, Philippe. Donald Sultan Appoggiaturas. Paris: Editions de La Difference, 1992. ISBN 1-878552-00-7
- Meyers, Michelle. Sean Scully, Donald Sultan: Abstraction, representation : paintings, drawings, and prints from the Anderson Collection. Stanford University Art Gallery, 1990. ASIN: B0006EV78O
- Avedon, Elizabeth. Donald Sultan-5. Vintage, 1988. ISBN 978-0394747934
- Danoff, I. Michael. Dunlop, Ian. Warren, Lynne. Donald Sultan. Chicago Museum of Contemporary Art, Chicago and Harry N. Abrams. Inc., New York, 1987. ISBN 0-933856-26-1
