= Royal Lichtenstein Quarter-Ring Sidewalk Circus =

Royal Lichtenstein Quarter-Ring Sidewalk Circus was a street theatre troupe that toured the United States between 1971 and 1993 as the self-described "world's smallest circus".

== Theological and theatrical origins ==
The main attraction and founder was Jesuit Nick Weber, who held degrees in theology and theater. He saw a circus as a vehicle to communicate theological lessons without being heavy-handed. "I used to be involved with community theater," he once explained, "but I got disenchanted with that. It wasn't open enough. People come to our shows and know they'll have fun." Yet Weber also avers, "Ours was an entertainment in every sense, but it was a ministry of the California Jesuits." Weber's very first experiment with street performing took place in downtown San Jose, California, under the title, "Sam's Sidewalk Show." For a few months after that he toured alone under the Royal Lichtenstein title and then was joined by three young friends for the first summer attempt in 1971. The following summer three young Jesuit scholastics joined for another tour. In the fall of 1972, the young Jesuits were replaced by two former students and the tiny show with the big name (selected as being easily remembered) began its annual cross-country tours.

In a 1974 People profile Weber explained the philosophy behind the show:

I make an art of not laying my formal religious trip on people. But the show's purpose is "pre-evangelical"—to soften up people to accept the surprise that God is present. God is a free spirit. He must be preached everywhere. In the temple, God is no longer a surprise.

== A Typical Season ==
A season ran from August through May performing in more than 120 cities with a cast as few as three to as many as eight. Venues included college campuses, shopping centers, churches, Indian reservations, company picnics and benefits.

Besides Weber, the other regular cast member was Mitch Kincannon, who acted as booking agent, house manager, performer, ombudsman and many other roles before crowds and behind the scenes. Kincannon, summing up the show's appeal, stated, "The payoff is creating an atmosphere for kids. It's their experience as we show the moral of the circus by transforming a dull parking lot into something magical, another world. The circus always has had this ability to transcend the average, boring, dull life."

The rest of the performers were generally people in their 20s who signed up for a season or so, although the show also actively recruited from audiences while travelling.

== Animal and Human Performers ==
The show had a small menagerie of performing animals that consisted at various times of bears, monkeys, miniature horses, foxes, pheasants, pigmy goats, dogs, parrots, ducks, and domestic cats. Time dubbed the performance "an amiable blend of circus acts and low-key morality plays." Drawing inspiration from the emerging New Vaudeville movement, acts could vary to include fire eating, dance, juggling, mime, parables, wire-walking and single trapeze, aerial roman rings, magic (including a version of Harry Houdini's Milk Can Escape) and clown antics.

== Off-season, funding and alumni ==
In the Seventies, summer months were spent at Santa Clara University rehearsing with the new cast members while recuperating after the hectic 10-month performance schedule. In 1980, the show's training quarters were relocated at the Jesuit Novitiate property in Montecito, near Santa Barbara.

Ongoing operations received substantial help from the California Province of the Jesuits during training periods and with capital outlay for the show's vehicles. Other substantial support came from passing the hat for voluntary audience contributions, board and room accommodations from en route host families, along with stipends paid by student associations and other performance sponsors.

Many alumni continued street performing or even transitioned into working in mainstream circuses and theater companies or other media related employment. Prominent examples include Dana Smith, Steve Aveson, Bill Cain, Joey Joey Colon, Kevin Curdt, Carlo Gentile, Darren Peterson, Jens Larson, Jim Jackson, Mary Nagler Hildebrand and Carlo Pellegrini, Nanci Olesen, John and Paul Hadfield, Juanita Madrigal, Jody Ellis, Stefan Fisher, Dom Ferry, Doug Rodman and Eric Wilcox.
