= Jacques Pellegrin (painter) =

French painter (1944–2021)

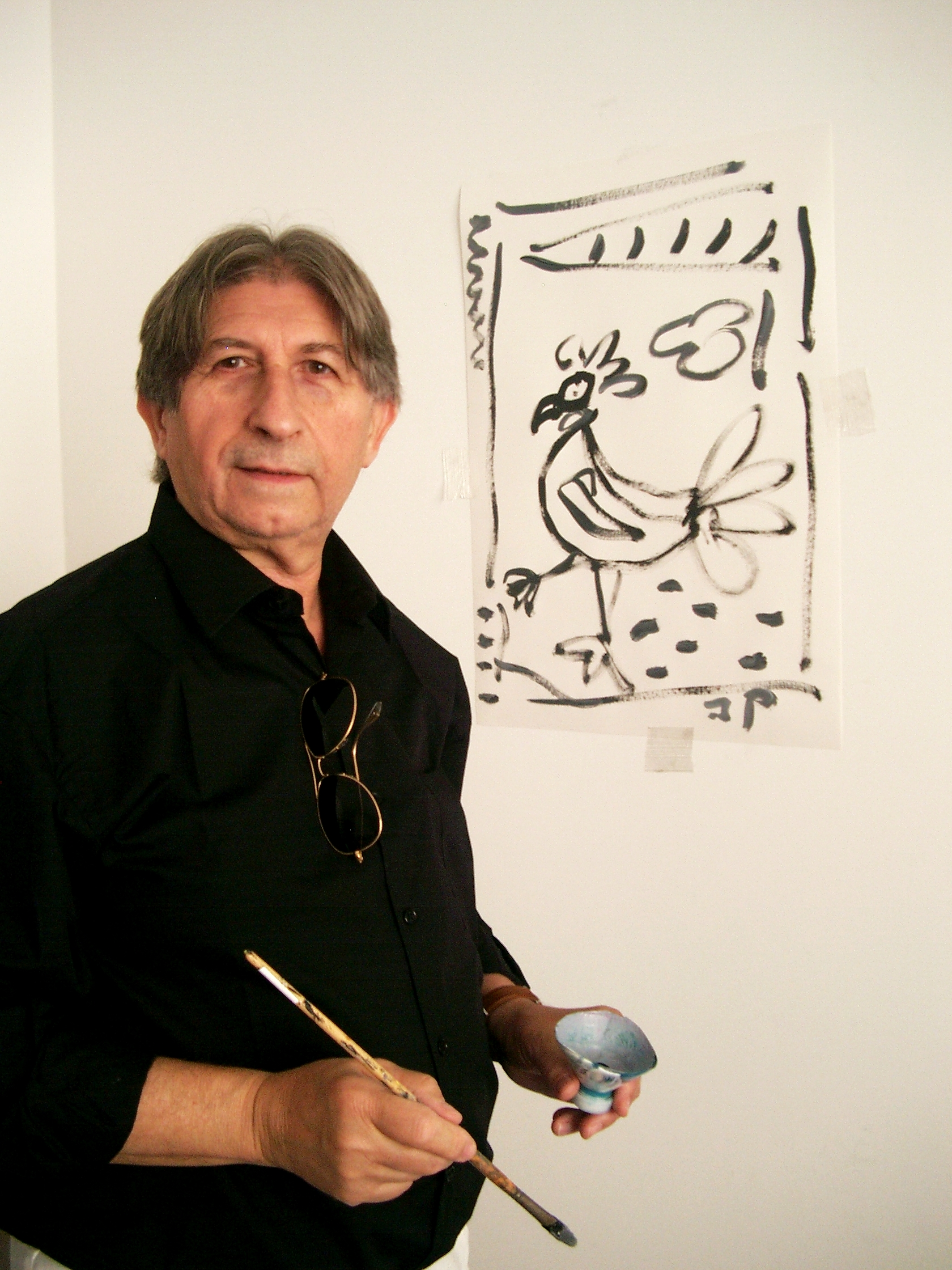
- Born: Aix-en-Provence, France
- Died: 7 April 2021
- Known for: Painting
- Movement: Figuration libre

Jacques Pellegrin (French pronunciation: [ʒak pɛlɡʁɛ̃]; 17 June 1944 – 7 April 2021) was a French painter.

== Biography ==
Jacques Pellegrin painted portraits, landscapes and still lifes. He started to paint at age eight. When he was eleven years old, he carried off the first prize from the Hôtel de Ville in Aix-en-Provence. His style connected first to classic and realist art movements, but then he discovered Impressionism. After studying to be a translator in Munich, he obtained a German (language) licence in Aix-en-Provence. Teaching was quickly forsaken in favour of living a life of chance as a free artist. In 1980 he devoted himself to painting and studied German Expressionism. Pellegrin was influenced by Fauvists and French Expressionists such as Vincent van Gogh, André Derain, Albert Marquet, Kees van Dongen, and Henri Matisse. He also followed artists of the Provence and Marseille schools, including Auguste Chabaud, Louis Mathieu Verdilhan, and Pierre Ambrogiani. His fundamental guideline: to paint and depict his epoch, his time.

He frequently used strong colors and underlines his figures with a thick, black stroke. Each painting tells a story, an anecdote, a memory. At the same time, strongly anchored in his epoch, when Pellegrin raises up the past, he does not emphasize nostalgia, only affection.

He is mentioned in the Benezit Dictionary of Artists (1999 and 2006).

== Main exhibitions ==
=== Exhibitions ===
- 1967 : Aix-en-Provence, Galerie La Provence Libérée
- 1969 : Aix-en-Provence, Galerie La Provence Libérée
- 1972 : Aix-en-Provence, Galerie des Cardeurs
- 1977 : Marseille, Galerie Le Tigre de Papier
- 1978 : Aix-en-Provence, Galerie Les Amis des Arts
- 1980 : Marseille, Galerie Mary
- 1983 : Aix-en-Provence, Galerie du Belvédère
- 1984 : Toulon, Galerie du Var-Matin
- 1986 : Marseille, Galerie La Poutre
- 1989 : Marseille, Galerie Chaix Bryan
- 1990 : Marseille, Galerie Forum Ars-Galicana
- 1991 : Marseille, Galerie Sylvestre
- 1993 : Ajaccio, Galerie La Marge
- 1993 : Lyon, Galerie Auguste Comte
- 1994 : Marseille, Galerie Montgrand
- 1995 : Ajaccio, Galerie La Marge
- 1995 - 1998 : Lyon, Galerie des Brotteaux
- 1997 : Aubenas, Château d'Aubenas
- 1998 : Saint-Rémy-de-Provence, Galerie à l'Espace des Arts
- 2000 : Châteauneuf-le-Rouge, Musée Arteum
- 2001 : London, Summer's Arts Gallery
- 2001 : Tübingen, Casula Gallery
- 2005 - 2006 : Aix-en-Provence, Casula Gallery
- 2006 : Brussels, Lyon, Saint-Rémy-de-Provence, Galerie à l'Espace des Arts
- 2006 : Milan, Casula Gallery
- 2008 : Dubai, Art Phui
- 2009 : Marseille, Galerie Art 152
- 2009 : Brussels, Galerie à l'Espace des Arts
- 2009 - 2010 : Dubai, The Mojo Gallery
- 2010 : Casablanca, Galerie au 9
- 2010 : Saint-Rémy-de-Provence, Musée Jouenne
- 2011 : Marrakesh, Marrakech Art Fair
- 2012 : Saint-Cyr-sur-Mer, Grand Hôtel Les Lecques
- 2012 : Stockholm, La Petite Galerie Française
- 2012 : Guangzhou, Canton Art Fair
- 2012 : Paris, Salon d'Automne at Grand Palais
- 2012 : Shanghai, Shanghai Art Fair
- 2013 : Hong Kong, Asia Contemporary Art Show at Marriott hotel
- 2014 : Singapore, Ode to Art Gallery
- 2014 : Bouc-Bel-Air, Castle
- 2014 : Aix-en-Provence, City Hall
- 2015 : Ajaccio, Galerie l'Académie
- 2016 : Marseille, La Bastide Massimo
- 2017 : Aix-en-Provence, Jacquou le Croquant
- 2017 : Marseille, La Bastide Massimo
- 2017 : Miami (United States), Spectrum Art Fair

=== Public collections ===
- Since 2000 : Châteauneuf-le-Rouge, Modern Art Museum
