= Parrish Art Museum =

Art museum in Water Mill, New York

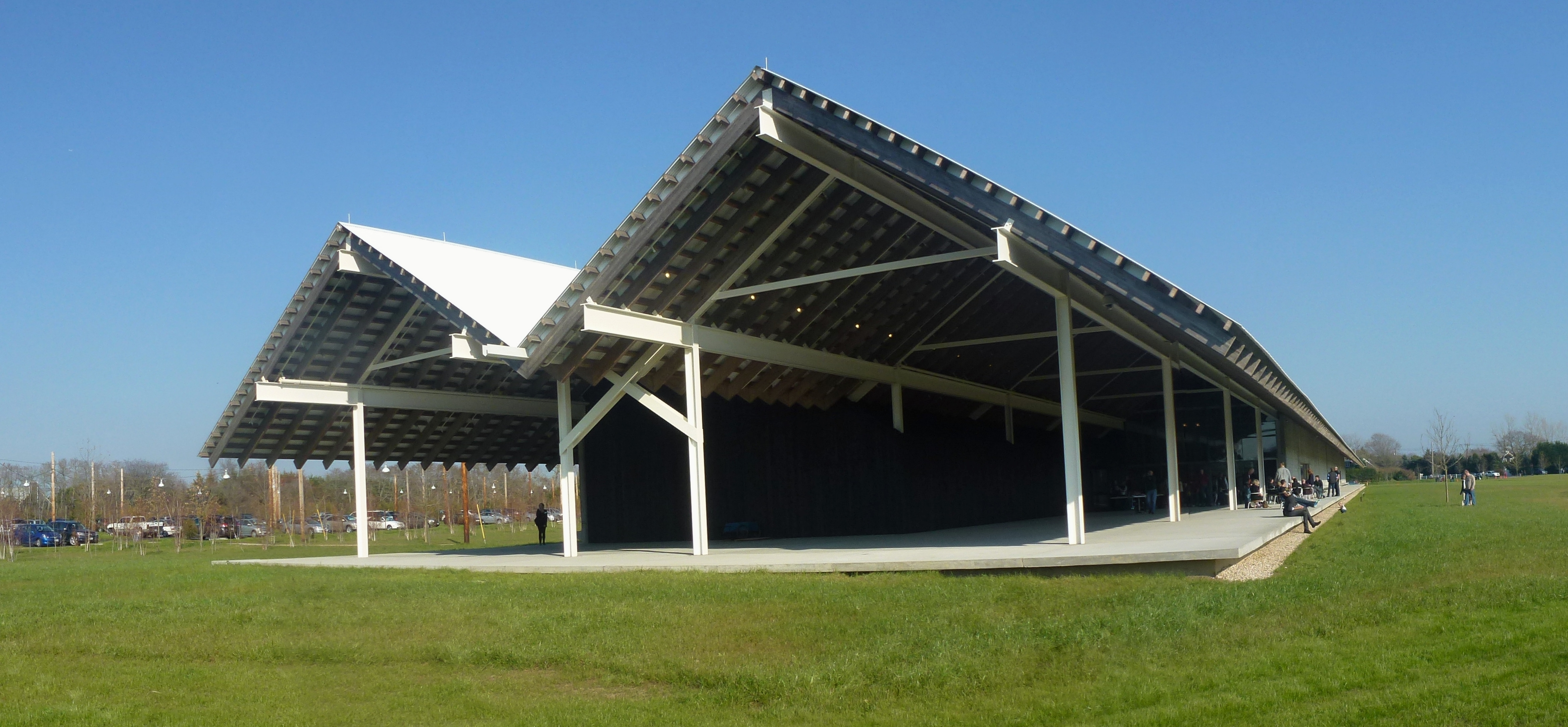

- Location within New York
- Established: 1898; 128 years ago
- Location: 279 Montauk Highway; Water Mill, NY
- Coordinates: 40.904334°N 72.366064°W
- Visitors: 30,000/yearly (old Jobs Lane location)
- Director: Monica Ramirez-Montagut
- Website: parrishart.org

The Parrish Art Museum is an art museum designed by Herzog & de Meuron Architects and located in Water Mill, New York, whereto it moved in 2012 from Southampton Village. The museum focuses extensively on work by artists from the artist colony of the South Shore (Long Island) and North Shore (Long Island).

The Parrish Art Museum was founded in 1898. It has grown into a major art museum with a permanent collection of more than 3,500 works of art from the nineteenth century to the present, including works by such contemporary painters and sculptors such as John Chamberlain, Chuck Close, Eric Fischl, April Gornik, Donald Sultan, Elizabeth Peyton, as well as by masters Dan Flavin, Roy Lichtenstein, Jackson Pollock, Lee Krasner, and Willem de Kooning. The Parrish houses among the world's most important collections of works by the preeminent American Impressionist William Merritt Chase and by the groundbreaking post-war American realist painter Fairfield Porter.

== History ==
=== Southampton village location (1898–2012) ===
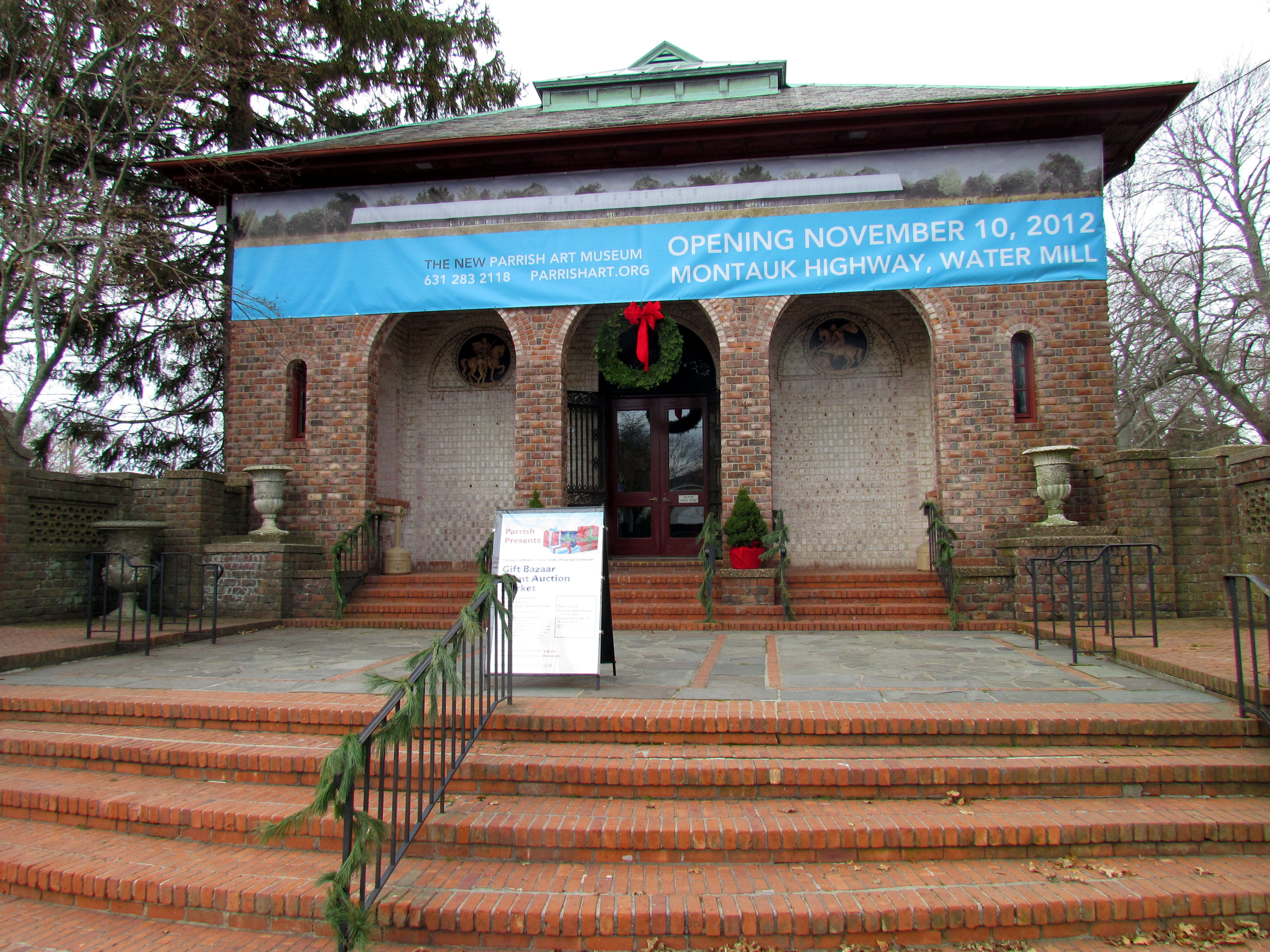
Parrish Art Museum at 25 Jobs Lane in December 2012

The Museum was founded in 1898 by Samuel Longstreth Parrish, a successful attorney and Quaker who began collecting art in the early 1880s and who established the museum to house his collection of Italian Renaissance painting and copies of classical and Renaissance sculpture. Designed by noted architect Grosvenor Atterbury and constructed in 1897 in downtown Southampton at 25 Jobs Lane, the Museum was incorporated the following year as the Art Museum of Southampton. One of the impetus for founding the museum in an artist colony where William Merritt Chase founded the Shinnecock Hills Summer School of Art.

The original building was expanded twice, in 1902 and 1913. After his death in 1932, the collection and building were bequeathed to the Village of Southampton but, without Parrish's guiding vision, the Museum ceased to thrive. It wasn't until the 1950s, under the direction of the newly elected president of the board of trustees, Rebecca Bolling Littlejohn, that the Museum enjoyed its own renaissance. Recognizing the importance of this country's contribution to the arts, Mrs. Littlejohn launched a campaign to strengthen the Museum's holdings of American art, with special attention to artists associated with eastern Long Island such as Thomas Moran, Childe Hassam, and Thomas Doughty. Upon her death, the Museum became the beneficiary of more than 300 paintings, drawings, and watercolors from her personal collection, which included work by Martin Johnson Heade, Asher B. Durand, John H. Twachtman, John Sloan, and a remarkable collection of thirty-one paintings by American Impressionist, William Merritt Chase.

In 1981, further depth was added to the collection when nearly 200 works of art by the prominent American painter, critic, and longtime Southampton resident Fairfield Porter (1907–1975) were donated by his wife Anne and by the artist's estate. Building from the strength of these collections, the Museum now traces the evolution of American art from its roots in an emerging landscape tradition through the liberating influences of European modernism and the development of the New York School to the stylistic diversity of contemporary art, focusing its exhibitions and acquisitions on American painting of the twentieth and twenty-first centuries, with special attention to artists who have lived and worked on Long Island's East End and their influence on the national and international art world. Once home to Jackson Pollock, Willem de Kooning, and Roy Lichtenstein, among many others, today's residents, full-time or seasonal, include Chuck Close, Ross Bleckner, April Gornik, Eric Fischl, Ilya and Emilia Kabakov, David Salle, and Donald Sultan.

The museum had long had a significant amount of its collection in storage. It 2000 it acquired the neighboring Rogers Memorial Library for an annex after the library moved to a new building on the edge of town. The library was acquired for $1.1 million from more than $3 million donated by Carroll Petrie for the acquisition and renovations.

The buildings were still considered too small for the collection. In 2012 as part of the move to Water Mill the library was sold for $2.875 to Ajax Holding LLC., which has plans to convert the building commercial space and to also restore it. The original Parrish structure is to undergo renovations designed by architect David Rockwell to become the new Southampton Center.

=== Water Mill location (2012–present) ===
The museum encountered opposition to its plans to modernize and enlarge its historic Jobs Lane complex. Recognizing the need to grow and to provide for a modern facility with appropriate climate control, the board of trustees decided to embark on a new project to design and construct a purpose-built building. In 2005, the Museum purchased a 14-acre (57,000 square meter) site in Water Mill, New York for $3.8 million on the site of a former tree nursery immediately adjacent to the Duck Walk Vineyards winery 2.3 miles (3.7 km) from the original location on Jobs Lane, Southampton. Following extensive research of more than 65 architect candidates, Pritzker Prize winners Herzog & de Meuron were engaged to develop a new building for the site. Construction costs were estimated at $80 million.

The original plan Herzog plan called for an $80 million village 62,974 square foot museum consisting of 30 modest, low-slung buildings, The buildings were to resemble the studios of area painters.

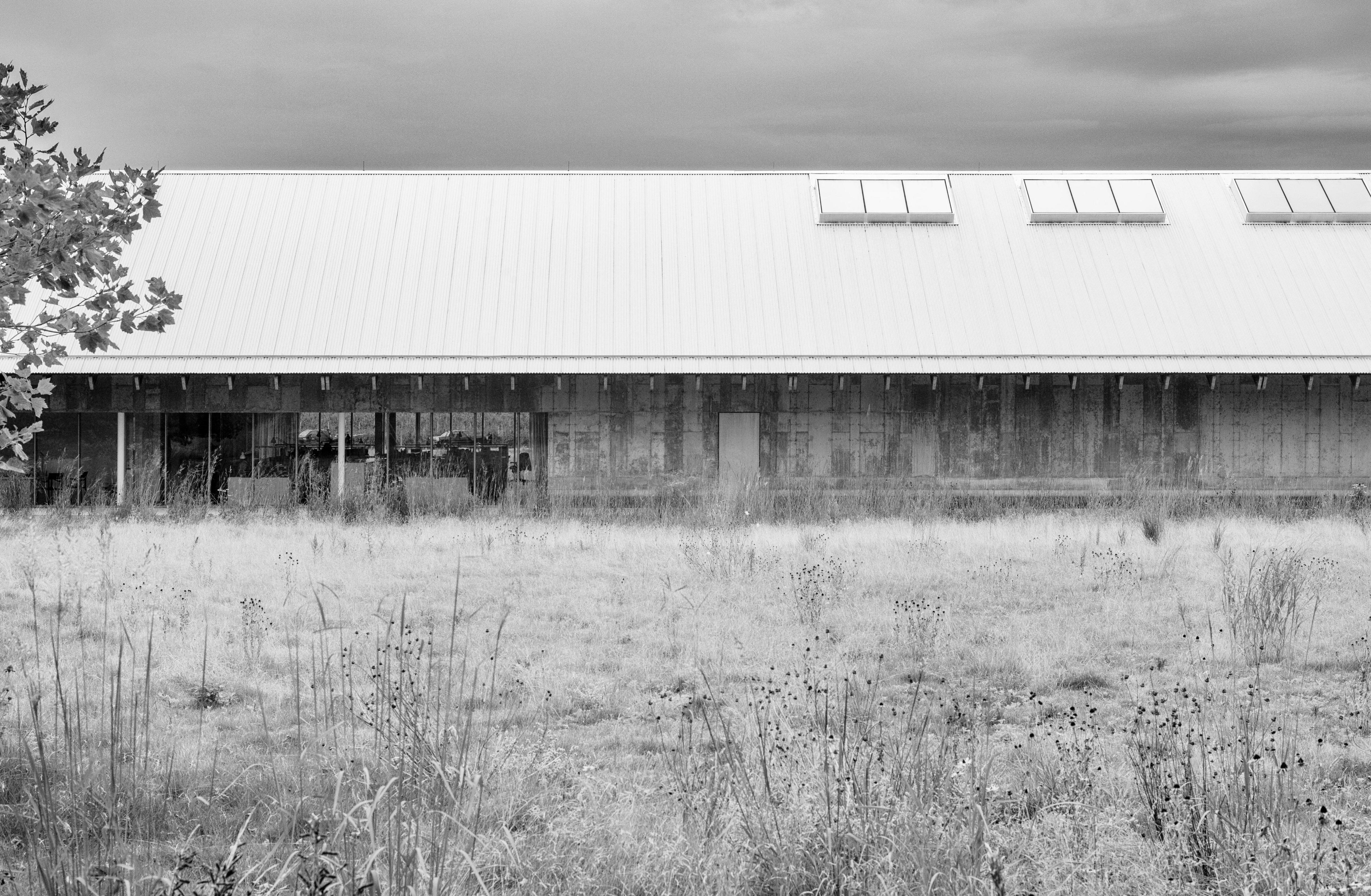
Parrish Art Museum, Elevation View

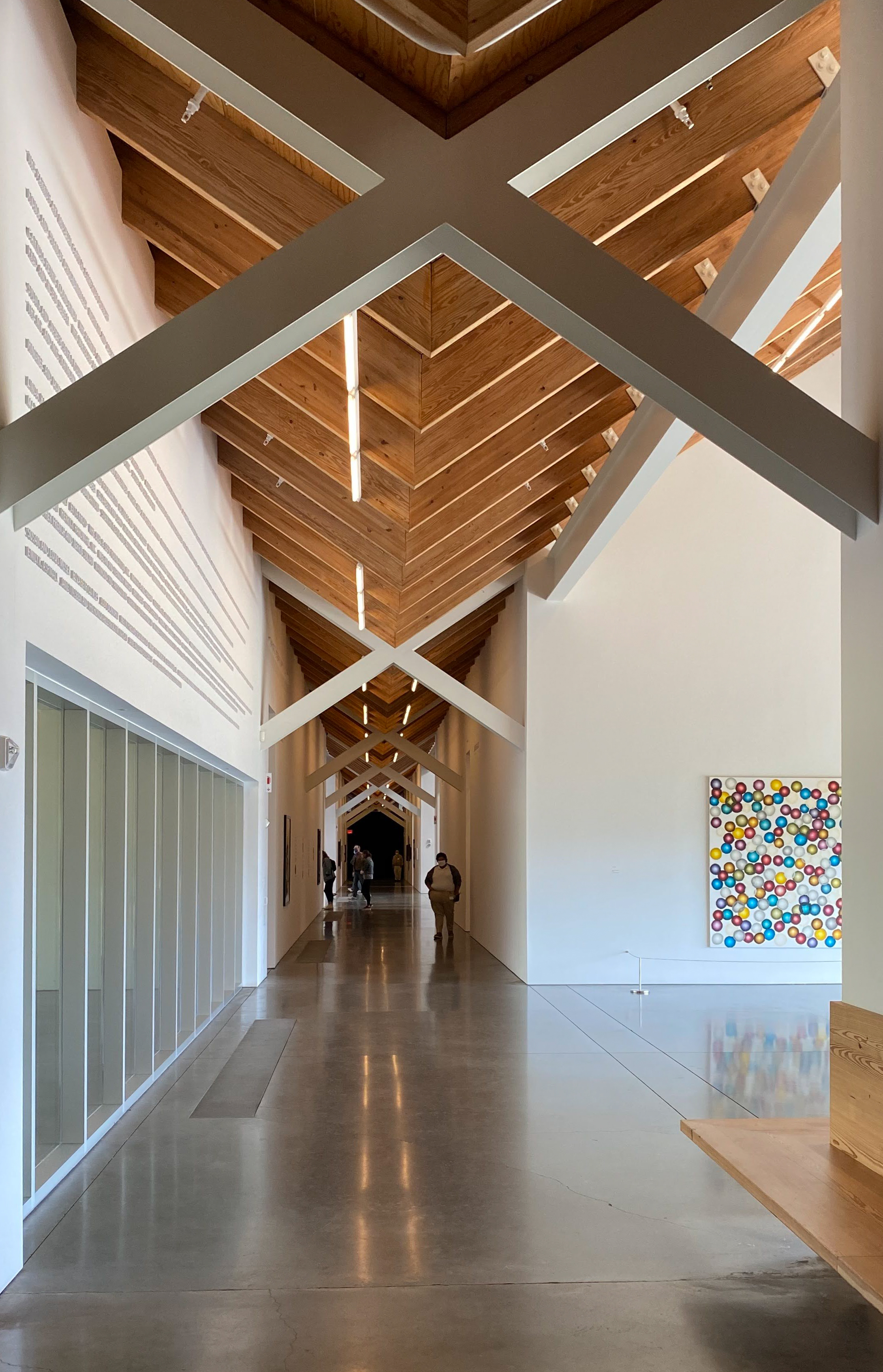

Terrie Sultan assumed the position of Director in April 2008, succeeding Trudy Kramer, who had initiated the new building campaign. With the recognition of impending financial difficulties, she and the Board of Trustees entered into discussions regarding opportunities to explore a different approach to a new building.

During the 2008 financial crisis, the museum dramatically downsized to be less than a third ($26.2 million) of the original budget. The new structure is designed as a gigantic barn 615 feet long and 95 feet wide. It has poured concrete walls. The building's footprint is 34,000 square feet. It has a 6,000 square foot porch as well as educational and multi-purpose spaces. Inside, the single-floor museum is structured in a very simple way, with public functions (such as reception, store, and café) to the west, administrative offices and art handling to the east, and the galleries, arrayed in two parallel bars, on either side of a central hall. There are seven galleries, totaling 7,600 square feet, for the permanent collection, and three for temporary exhibitions. All of the galleries are illuminated by daylight that shifts gradually throughout the day and changes with the seasons. The building which parallels the Montauk Highway to the south and the Long Island Rail Road tracks to the north is said to have been situated so it can catch the "Hamptons light" which is said to be a reason for the area's popularity as an artist colony (its location about a mile from the Atlantic Ocean to the south and two miles from the Little Peconic Bay to the north) It officially opened on November 10, 2012. The first temporary exhibit was by Malcolm Morley who has a home in Bellport, New York.

== Notable collections ==
=== William Merritt Chase ===
The Parrish holds the largest public collection of William Merritt Chase (over 40 paintings and works on paper) and an extensive archive, including over 1000 photographs relating to the life and work of the artist, in particular, family photographs of summers spent here on the East End.

As portraitist and landscape painter, and as a teacher of art, Chase was unequalled in his day and it was not surprising that when a group of Southampton boosters had the idea of improving the summer resort by establishing an art school, the Shinnecock Hills Summer School of Art, they chose the prominent Mr. Chase to be the first teacher.

The Museum's collection features paintings from all periods of his work, including the early Still Life with Fruit (1871); works from the famous New York park scenes series, notably Park in Brooklyn (ca. 1887); major studio paintings from the 1880s, such as The Blue Kimono (ca. 1888); and of course, the paintings made during those summers in the Shinnecock Hills, including The Bayberry Bush (ca. 1895).

=== Fairfield Porter ===
Fairfield Porter was one of the most important American realist painters from 1949 until his death in 1975. Not coincidentally, these were the years when Porter lived in Southampton, New York, and in 1979 his estate recognized the bond between the artist and the Museum by donating some 250 works to the Parrish collection.

Porter was both a gifted painter and an accomplished writer who produced some of the most lucid art criticism and commentary of the time, notably his reviews for the magazine Art News. He insisted that he painted what he saw rather than what he might assume to be there. Porter painted what he was familiar with—his family and friends and the places he lived and visited, including Southampton, New York and a family-owned island off the coast of Maine where he had summered since childhood.

Writing about the intimate interior paintings of the French artists Vuillard and Bonnard, Porter found that in their work that recorded the ordinary "…the extraordinary is everywhere." An artist who steadfastly maintained a figurative vision, he knew and admired many Abstract Expressionist artists on the East End, especially Willem de Kooning. Porter once wrote: "The realist thinks he knows ahead of time what reality is, and the abstract artist what art is, but it is in its formality that realist art excels, and the best abstract art communicates an overwhelming sense of reality."

=== Other collections ===
While the Chase and Porter collections are cornerstones of the Museum's holdings, the permanent collection is wide-ranging. In 1958, Alfred Corning Clark donated to the Parrish more than two dozen paintings and watercolors, among them works by Ralph Blakelock, James A. M. Whistler, William Glackens, and Arthur B. Davies. Works by William Sidney Mount, Winslow Homer, Ernest Lawson, and Charles Burchfield were given to the Museum by Clark a year later. In 1961, in addition to artists mentioned previously, Mrs. Littlejohn bequeathed to the Parrish works by John Frederick Kensett, Otis Bullard, E. L. Henry, George Luks, and Everett Shinn, among others.

Since the Porter bequest of 1975, the Parrish has increasingly focused on American painting of the twentieth and twenty-first centuries, with a special emphasis on artists who have maintained studios on the East End of Long Island since the 1950s. Among those represented in the collection are Jane Freilicher, Larry Rivers, James Brooks, Alfonso Ossorio, Esteban Vicente, Jane Wilson, and Robert Dash, to name just a few. More recent East End arrivals whose work the Museum holds are Chuck Close, Joan Snyder, Joe Zucker, Alice Aycock, Lynda Benglis, April Gornik, Keith Sonnier, Mary Heilmann, Malcolm Morley, and many more. At the same time the Museum continues to strengthen its earlier twentieth-century holdings.

The collection also includes a substantial number of prints and drawings, among them works by George Bellows, Marsden Hartley, Larry Rivers, Helen Frankenthaler, and Robert Rauschenberg. In 1982 Paul F. Walter donated drawings by many Minimalist painters and sculptors, including Barry Le Va, Dorothea Rockburne, Mel Bochner, and Jennifer Bartlett. Robert Dunnigan gave the Museum more than 500 etchings in 1976, with prints by many of the American artists who participated in the “painter-etcher” movement of the late nineteenth century. Also in the Museum's print collection are nearly 200 Japanese woodblock prints presented as part of the Littlejohn bequest. Dating from the nineteenth and twentieth centuries, they provide a contrast to their American counterparts from the same period.

In 2023 The Parrish Art Museum acquired an installation entitled 'Chisme' by Salvadoran contemporary artist, Studio Lenca. This work was created by the artist during a residency at Fountainhead Miami and was made in collaboration with the low-wage workers union WeCount! in South Florida.

=== Exhibitions ===
The Museum schedules four or five exhibitions per year. While some recent shows, such as Fairfield Porter: Raw—The Creative Process of an American Master and American Landscapes: Treasures from the Parrish Art Museum, are drawn from the permanent collection, the majority are exhibitions organized by Parrish curators exploring themes and concepts in art. Recent solo shows have included Alice Aycock: Some Stories are Worth Repeating; Jennifer Bartlett: History of the Universe—Paintings 1970–2011; Rackstraw Downes: Onsite Paintings, 1972–2008; Alex Katz: Seeing, Drawing, Making; Roy Lichtenstein: American Indian Encounters; Platform: Maya Lin; Platform: Josephine Meckseper; Jean Luc Mylayne; Alan Shields: Stirring the Waters; Michelle Stuart: Drawn from Nature; and Jack Youngerman: Folding Screen Paintings. Notable among recent group exhibitions are Encouraging American Genius: Master Paintings from the Corcoran Gallery of Art; All the More Real; Sand: Memory, Meaning, and Metaphor; Modern Photographs: The Machine, the Body, and the City; and Damaged Romanticism: A Mirror of Modern Emotion.

The Parrish also has a long tradition of juried exhibitions. For most of the Museum's history, these exhibitions were open to all artists, who were selected by a panel of three judges. In 2008, in recognition of the Museum's important mission of celebrating the art of the East End, the format changed to encourage a more interactive engagement among artists, and was renamed Artists Choose Artists. Submissions were limited to artists from eastern Long Island, whose digital entries were reviewed by nine established artists from the region. Each juror was charged to select as many entrants as they wished for studio visits, with the goal of selecting two to include along with examples of their own work. This format not only focused on the artists of the region but also encouraged interaction among artists at different points in their careers. Artists Choose Artists of the East End continues to be a recurring program.

After the Parrish moved to its Water Mill location in November 2012, it has 4,600 square feet (430 m^{2}) of exhibition space dedicated to temporary exhibitions and 7,600 square feet (710 m^{2}) for display of the permanent collection. Recent shows have focused on Steven and William Ladd; Alan Shields; Jules Feiffer; Joe Zucker; Robert Dash; Chuck Close; and Andreas Gursky. Future shows will focus on Jane Freilicher and Jane Wilson; Alexis Rockman; Ross Bleckner; Eric Fischl, and David Salle.

In an interview for Hamptons Magazine in July, 2012, Sultan said that for the opening in November, 2012, the Parrish would show its first-ever installation featuring art from all periods in the museum's 2,600-work permanent collection, adding that many works will be completely new to visitors. During the building campaign, the article by Judith H. Dobrzynski said, the museum acquired many more painting and sculptures that would be shown, including a large Louise Nevelson sculpture, Dorothea Rockburne's "Touchstone" and Rainer Fetting's "Two Sunsets in East Hampton." Sultan added, "We covet a major Jackson Pollock, and some more great Abstract Expressionism pieces,” she said. “We have some, but it would be nice to have more works by Fischl, Salle, Bleckner, Close, Alice Aycock….”

== Directors ==
- 2008–2020: Terrie Sultan
- 2021: Kelly Taxter
- 2022: Melanie Crader (ad interim)
- 2022–present: Mónica Ramírez-Montagut
