= Maurizio Pellegrin =

Italian-American visual artist

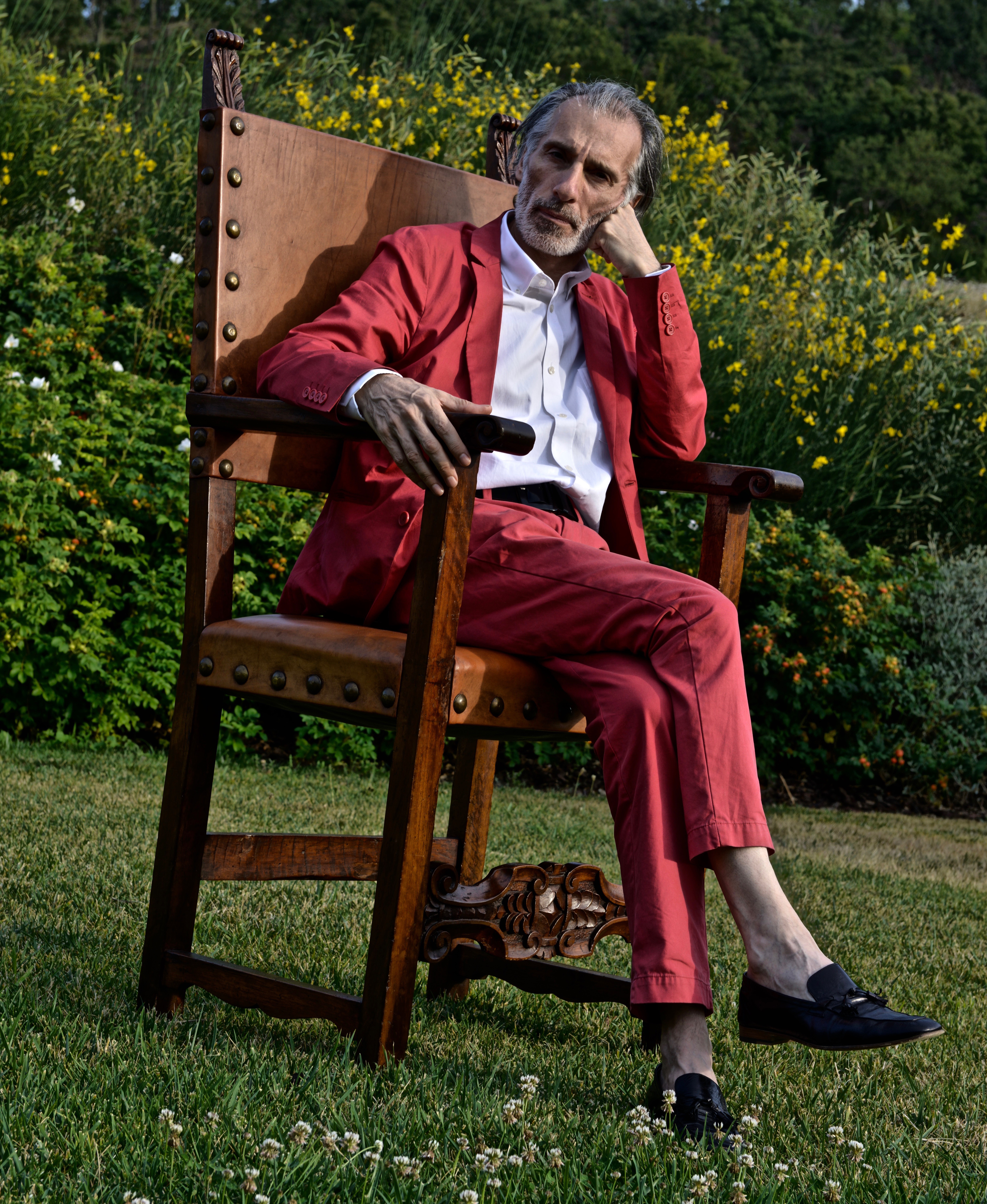
- Maurizio Pellegrin
- Born: July 21, 1956 (age 70)
- Education: Ca' Foscari, University of Venice; Accademia di Belle Arti, Venice
- Known for: Installation art, sculpture
- Website: mauriziopellegrin.com

Maurizio Pellegrin (born July 21, 1956) is an Italian and American visual artist. He works with installations, photography and video. He is married and has two sons.

== Biography ==
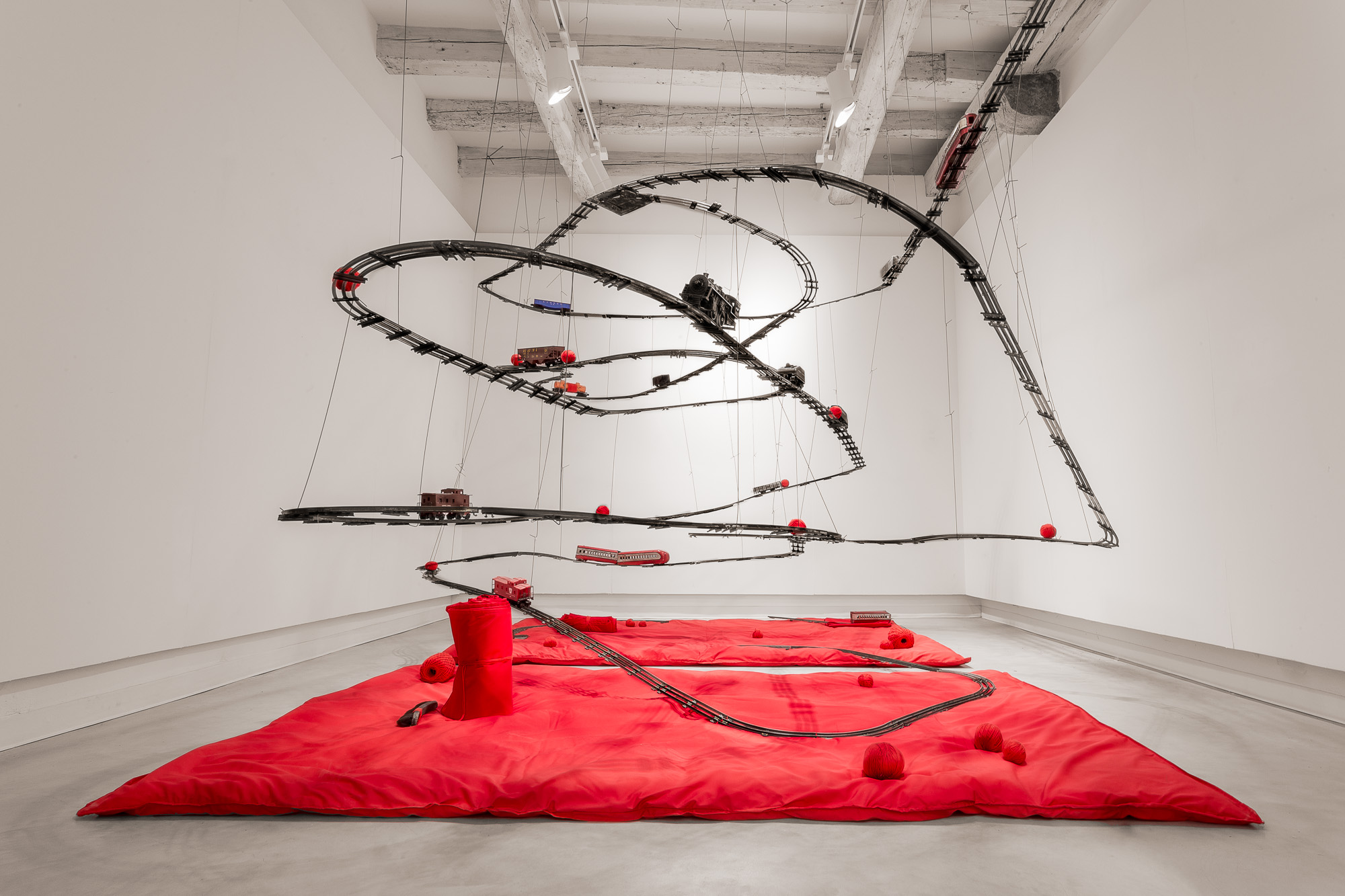
Maurizio Pellegrin, Where Fly the Trains, 2015

Maurizio Pellegrin was born in Venice, Italy in 1956. He lives in New York and Venice. He graduated in Art History at Ca' Foscari University of Venice. Simultaneously he devoted himself to the study of Studio Art at the Accademia di Belle Arti of Venice where he earned a MFA in Studio Art. In the 90s Pellegrin started his academic career. He was the Director of the Venice Program Master of Art of New York University where he also taught for almost two decades. In those years he joined the Teachers College, Columbia University where, besides teaching, he was offered the position of Senior Curator of the Gallery. He also taught in the Department of Architecture at Rhode Island School of Design. Later, in 2011, he was appointed Director of the School at the National Academy Museum and School, New York, where he later became the Dean and where in 2014-2015 he was also the Creative Director. Thanks to his international experience in 2017, Pellegrin was appointed Chief Executive of Cultural Affairs at two ancient Venetian institutions, I.R.E. and Fondazione Venezia, where he created the program Observatory for the Arts whose objective is to sustain cultural debate, to maintain the institutions' historical sites and overall to support life itself in Venice. Always in 2017 he founded the New York School of the Arts where is now the Executive Director.

Pellegrin's work has been the subject of more than 150 solo exhibitions and hundreds of group exhibitions in international galleries and museums. His works are in major private and public collections worldwide where, as an omnivorous collector, he arranges found objects gathered during his travels around the world, akin to Venetian traders of the past. He meticulously composes antique objects, dress patterns, musical instruments, threads, black and white photographs and other items according to an intricate, personal system of organization.

There is a vast literature on his work, being the author and subject of more than 30 monographs, and his work has been published in more than 500 articles and essays.

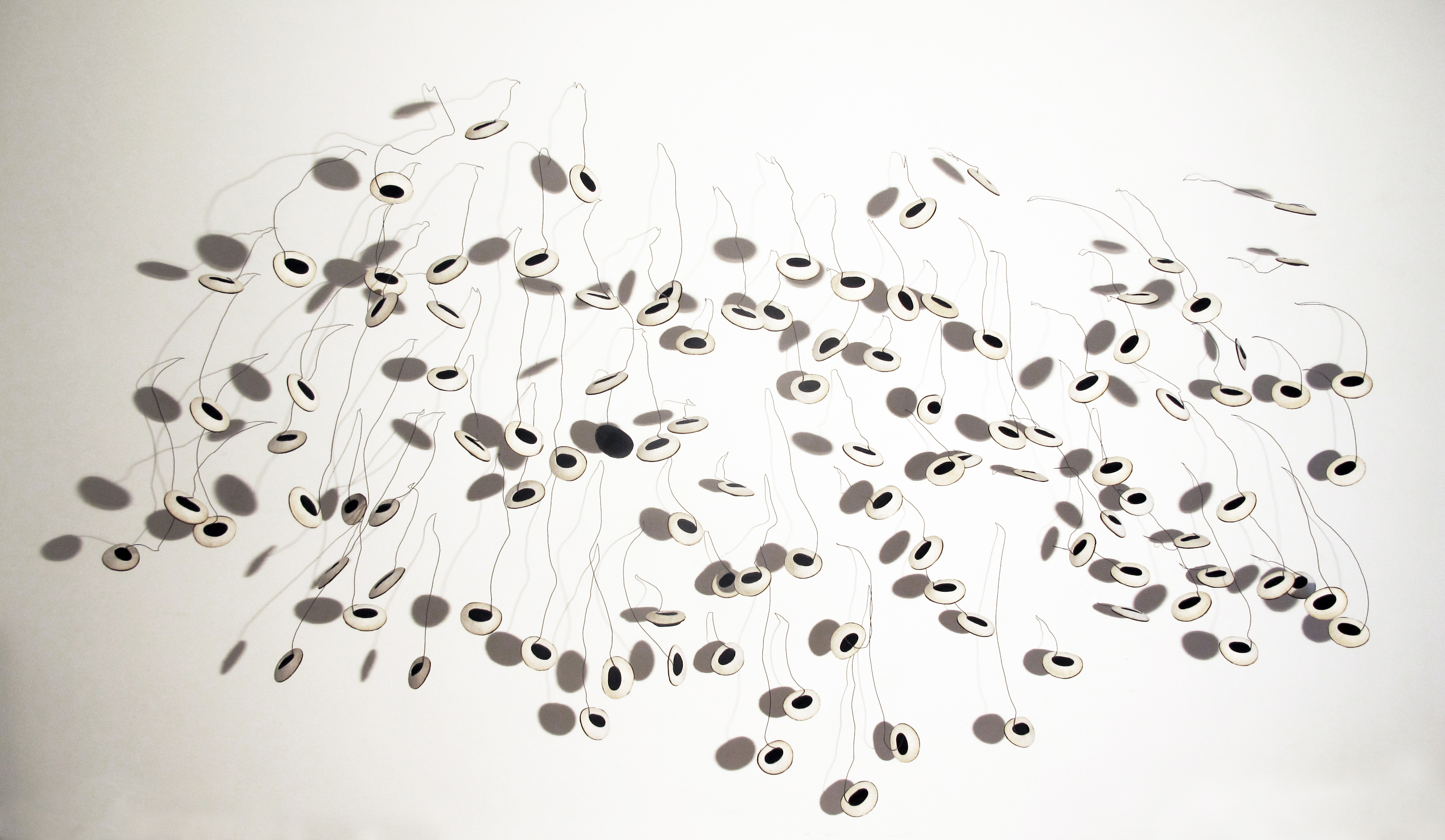
Maurizio Pellegrin, 104 Eyes and 1 Black Dot, 2011

== Work ==
Maurizio Pellegrin began showing his work in the early 1980s. By the middle of the decade, he was creating installations with his structured and organized system of objects and their symbolic associations. He arranged found objects that he had gathered during his travels around the world, channeling his passion and knowledge of antiquities through his work. Pellegrin has always been interested in the way objects transmit energy and how the memory of their use endures. He sees objects as the testimony of human life and artifacts of memory, as well as the remains of life after death. He ascribes meaning to his work based on the science of Numerology, or the study of numbers and their influence on human life based on their symbolic and arithmetic values. His installations deal with the concept of space– both physically and philosophically– becoming universes organized by symbols and metaphors. The arrangements of objects and materials develop a new hierarchy in which their previous functions are drastically changed. Step by step, the capacity of communication and the inner power of the different elements (often wrapped by the artist to contain the energy) establish a new world of relations. Colors, which are always few, are then chosen for specific philosophical implications and psychological effects. Pellegrin's wall arrangements and installations are characterized by a somber beauty, personal and historical references. The incorporation of mostly black and white photography in Pellegrin’s work, along with video, began in the 1990s and continues to play an important role today.

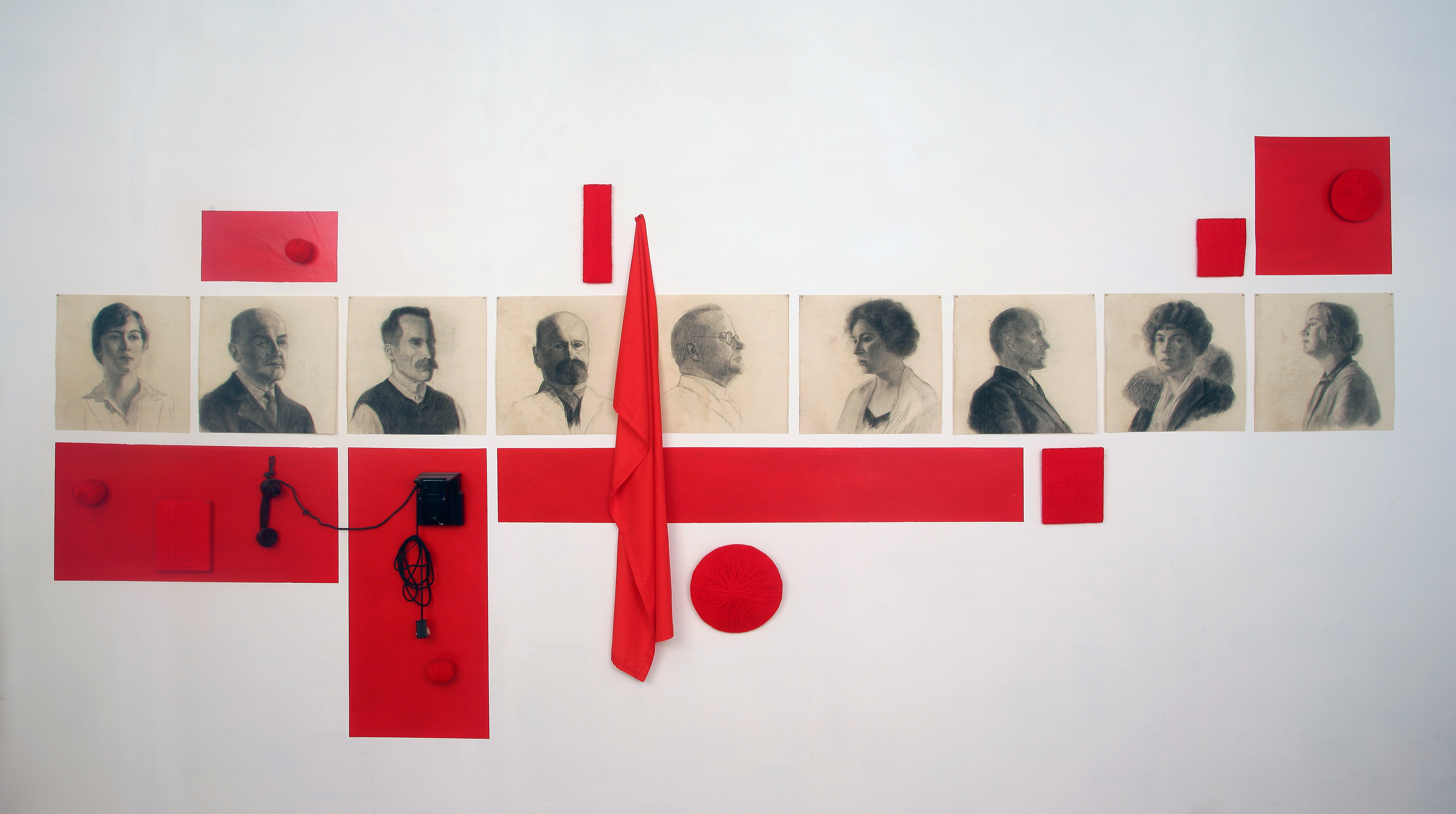
Maurizio Pellegrin, Alcuni, 2003

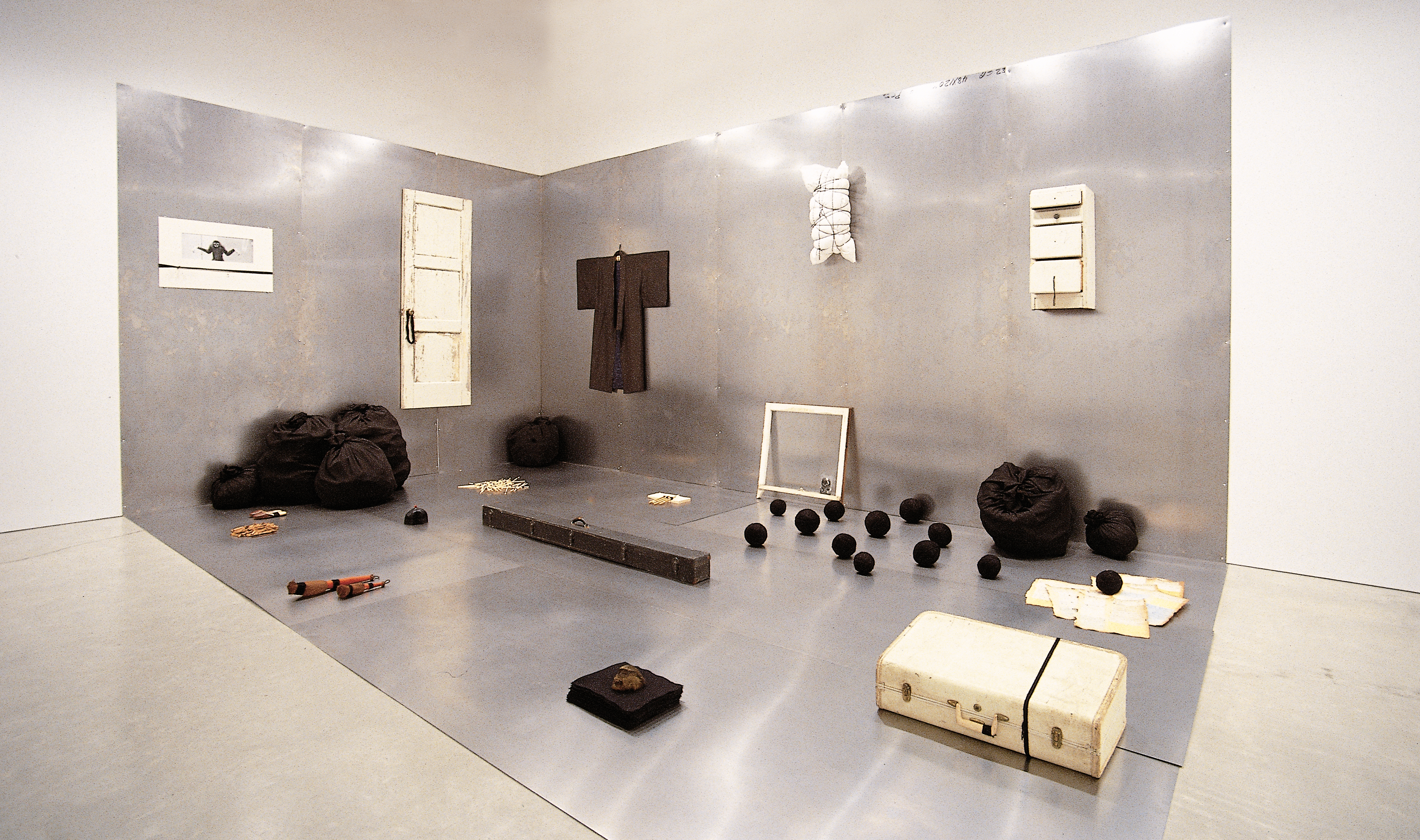
Maurizio Pellegrin, The Monkey Room, 1998

== Selected exhibitions ==
Maurizio Pellegrin at the age of 26, in 1982, started showing at the international Galleria Il Capricorno in Venice, Italy where he had the chance to meet artists such as Keith Haring, James Brown and Donald Baechler. In the late 80s he moved to Rome where his rigorously structured wall installations became widely known in Italy thanks to multiple exhibitions at Galleria Valentina Moncada, Paolo Vitolo, and Il Ponte Contemporanea. Pellegrin's career made an advance in 1988 when he was invited by Giovanni Carandente to participate to the XLIII Venice Biennale. This occasion lead him to have solo exhibitions in important American museums such as the San Diego Museum of Contemporary Art, San Diego in 1990 (exhibition curated by Lynda Forsha), The Corcoran Gallery of Art (exhibition curated by Terrie Sultan), Washington D.C in 1992, and The Museum of Modern Art (MoMA) (exhibition curated by Fereshteh Daftari), New York in 1993. His trips to the United States intensified because along with the museum exhibitions, arrived the possibility of working with Jack Shainman Gallery (1990–95) and Tony Shafrazi Gallery in New York, and Feigen Incorporated in Chicago. In the 1990s Pellegrin divided his time between New York and Venice. In New York for John Gibson Gallery and Esso Gallery, in L.A. for Mark Moore Gallery, in Venice, Italy for Nuova Icona, and in Cleveland for the Cleveland Center for Contemporary Art among others, Pellegrin conceived a cycle of site-specific works which involved the entire space of the gallery, sometimes covering the walls with monochromatic quilts or metal sheets, recreating unexpected atmospheres animated by objects and recurring motifs. Pellegrin further developed his interest for the challenges given by the space, pre-existing energies, and history creating site-specific works also in historical museums, churches, palaces, and gardens throughout the world. The images of many of these site-specific works are collected in the books Maurizio Pellegrin - Reflection and Intention (1999) and Maurizio Pellegrin by Alice Rubbini (2005). In the meantime Pellegrin exhibited in Germany in a few galleries among which Andreas Binder and Galerie Thomas in Munich, and Galerie Beck & Eggeling in Leipzig. From 1995 to 2002 Pellegrin worked with Lisa Sette Gallery in Scottsdale, creating installations focused on black and white photography, one the leitmotiv of his work. In 2005 his hometown, Venice, celebrated Pellegrin in eight museums simultaneously. The project called Isole was organized on a series of site specific exhibitions, in the Doge's Palace, Museo Correr, Museo di Palazzo Mocenigo, Ca' Rezzonico, Galleria Internazionale d’Arte Moderna (Venezia) Ca' Pesaro, Stanze Monumentali della Biblioteca Nazionale Marciana, and others. Isole reveals the influences that have informed Pellegrin’s work including photography and cinema, poetry and literature, architecture, and music. The following year, in 2006, the Peggy Guggenheim Collection in Venice opened its doors to Pellegrin who, for the occasion, presented a selection of video installations in an exhibition called It’s a Jungle out There: the Illegal Maurizio Pellegrin, 12 films. In Italy, Pellegrin has exhibited in other galleries among whom Studio Giangaleazzo Visconti, Milan; Studio Tommaseo – Trieste Contemporanea, Trieste; and Marignana Arte, Venice where in 2015 he showed Flying Trains, a large suspended installation where delicate curves of seemingly weightless railways generate a soft centrifugal force.

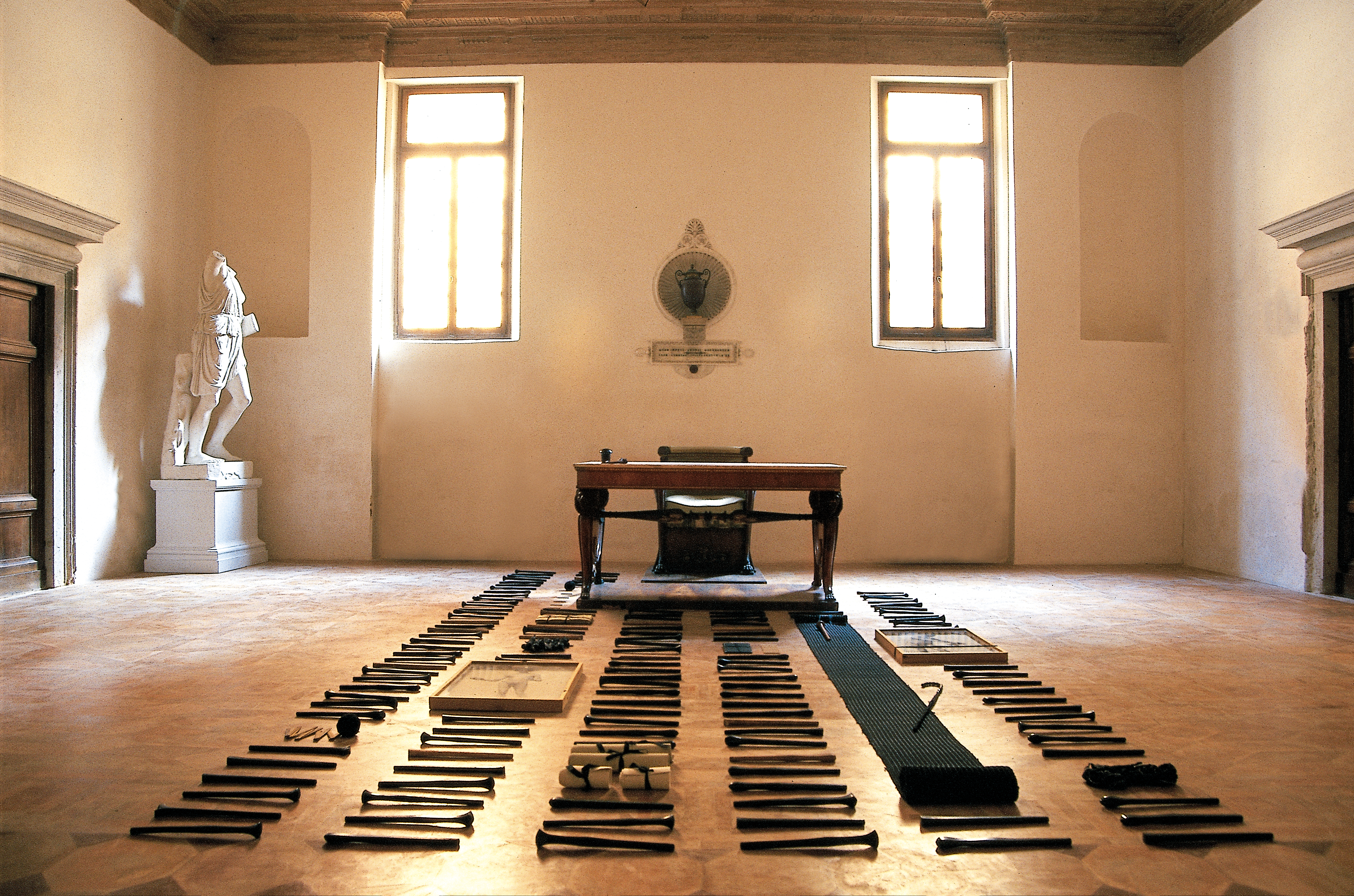
Maurizio Pellegrin, The Italian Room, 1997

== Selected bibliography ==
- Fossati, Filippo, MP: Flying Trains, Hanging Notes and Other Thoughts, Marignana Arte, Venezia, 2015 (catalogue)
- Graeme Sullivan, Art Practice as Research: Inquiry in the Visual Arts, Chapter 3, edition 2 (2010) ISBN 9781412974516
- Urbani, Vittorio, Maurizio Pellegrin in Istanbul: actions, reactions, memories and images, in The Great M. P. in Istanbul, BM-SUMA Contemporary Art Center, Istanbul, Turkey, 2008 (catalogue)
- Gillo Dorfles, It’s a Jungle out there: The Illegal Maurizio Pellegrin, 12 films Peggy Guggenheim Collection, Falcon Court Press, Venice, 2006 (catalogue), with an introduction by Alice Rubbini
- Brusatin, Manlio et al Writings on Maurizio Pellegrin 1980 - 2006, Skira, Milan, 2006 ISBN 8876248927
- Rubbini, Alice, Maurizio Pellegrin, Charta, Milano, 2005 ISBN 88-8158-556-1
- Putnam, James, Art and Artifact, the Museum as a Medium, Thames & Hudson, London, 2001. (Catalogue) ISBN 0-5002-3790-5
- Madra Beral, Akdeniz Metaforlari III, Urbani, Vittorio, Too beautiful to be True Istanbul, December, 2000.(Catalogue)
- Snyder, Jill et al., The Water Dream-Maurizio Pellegrin at Cleveland Center for Contemporary Art, Cleveland, September 2000. (Catalogue) ISBN 1-8803-5316-4
- Caldura, Riccardo et al., Maurizio Pellegrin: Reflection and Intentions, Arsenale Editrice, Venice, June 1999. ISBN 8877432551
- Urbani, Vittorio et al., MP: La stanza cinese, La stanza cinese, La stanza italiana, La stanza africana, Nuova Icona, Venice 1997. (Catalogue)
- Francesco Bonami, Dan Cameron, Terrie Sultan, Turner, Maurizio Pellegrin: Works from Private Collections 1986-1996. Venice, January 1997. ISBN 9-1116-8185-3
- Dan Cameron, Maurizio Pellegrin The Centre Gallery, MDCC, Wolfson Galleries, Miami, September - October 1993. (Catalogue)
- Turner J, Francesco Bonami, Maurizio Pellegrin Works, 1990-1994, 1994
- Terrie Sultan, Maurizio Pellegrin, The Corcoran Gallery of Art, Washington D.C., March 1992. (Catalogue)
- Carandente, Giovanni, XLIII Esposizione, Internazionale d'Arte La Biennale di Venezia, Venice, 1988. (Catalogue) ISBN 8-8208-0349-6

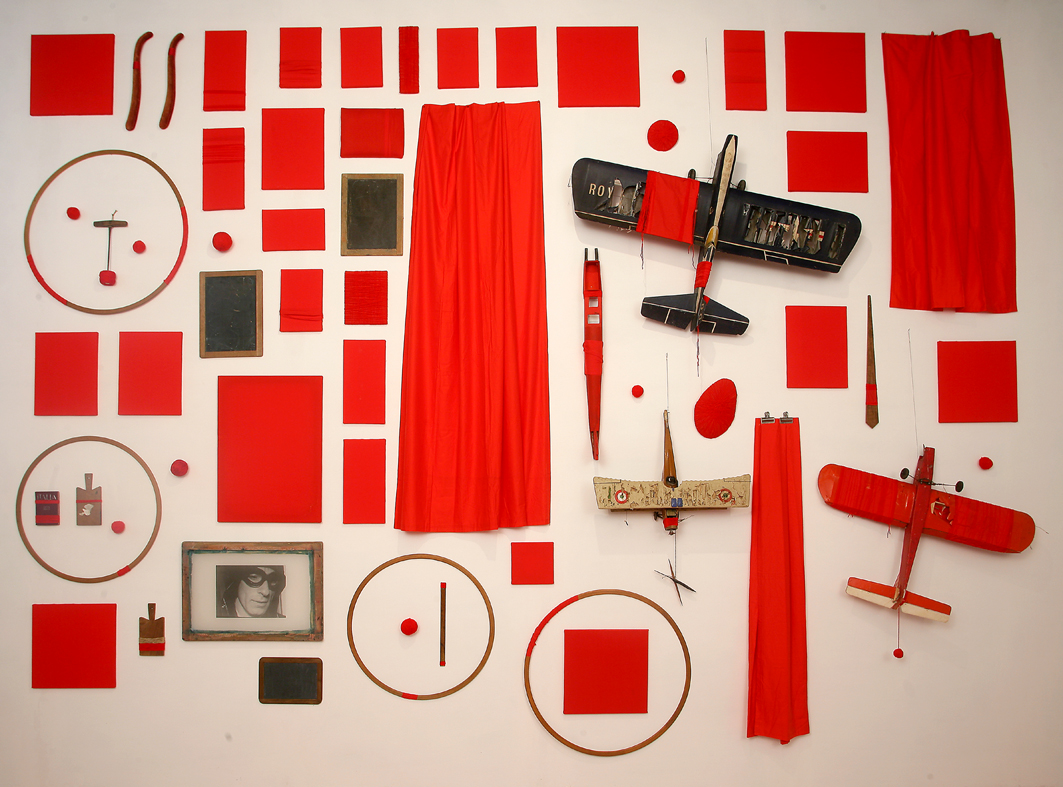
Maurizio Pellegrin, Transito e scorrimento, 2005,

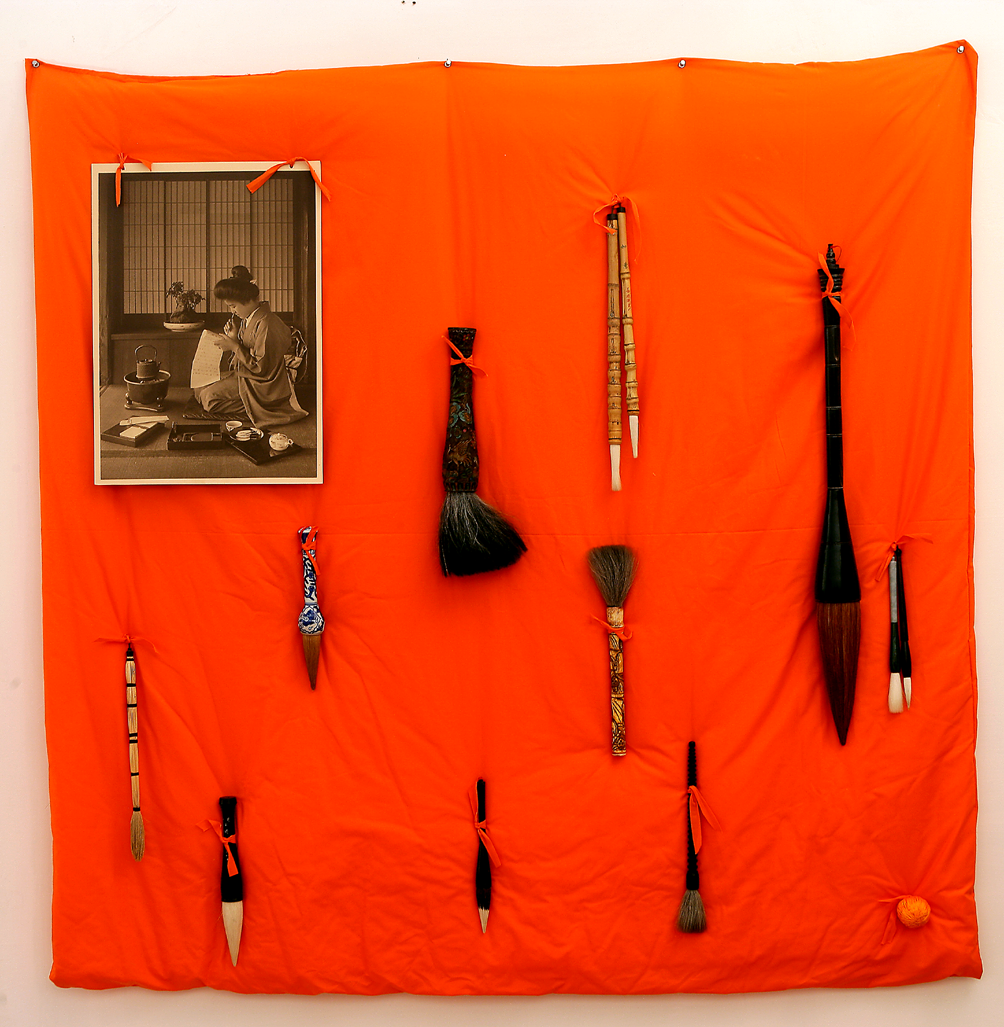
Maurizio Pellegrin, Sui pennelli giapponesi, 2005
