= Osmeivy Ortega Pacheco =

Osmeivy Ortega Pacheco (born 1980) is a Cuban visual artist based in Havana, Cuba. He works primarily in large-scale, monochromatic lithographs featuring the human body and animals.

== Biography ==
Pacheco was born in 1980 in Havana. He specializes in lithographs of animals and nature. He originally spent four years studying to become a lawyer, but changed his focus to art. He apprenticed at the Manero Workshop in Cuba. He learned about lithography at the Instituto Superior de Arte, also known as the University of Arts. He spent his time at the university working on ways to advance the development of Cuba's culture. He decided to not continue down this path, seeing that this meant his work would have to be based on the politics of Cuba, and he did not want to be in the middle of the political issues in the country. He graduated from the Escuela Nacional de Bellas Artes "San Alejandro" in 2003, after which the school hired him as a professor. Pacheco currently teaches printmaking at the Instituto Superior de Arte. Because paper can be a difficult material to acquire in Cuba, he is known to print his works of art on cleaning rags and mop fabric that is used to clean floors. Osmeivy collaborated and teamed up with the aid and relief of Hurricane Irma. In 2017, Pacheco was at Otahuhu College in New Zealand during a five-week artist-in-residence fellowship where he taught woodcarving to Maori students. Throughout this time, he was visited by the art department of King's College and worked alongside teachers and students.

== Education ==
Osmeivy Ortega Pacheco first studied at the Manero Workshop. Later on he graduated from the Escuela Nacional de Bellas Artes "San Alejandro" in Havana in 2003.

== Artworks ==
His art works are mainly large-scale pieces, and can reach eight feet tall in height. The titles he selects are personal, and reference a special part of his life. Aside from lithography, Pacheco creates woodcuts and linocuts. His main subject matter is animals, animal studies, and animals that are non-native to Cuba. He often uses non-native animals such as zebras and giraffes to emphasize Cuba's African roots. In addition to animals as subjects, he also features the human body and focuses on the muscular system. Pacheco frequently creates sets of prints, mostly in sets of five. He often employs graphite and stencils in his work to achieve different textures His works are predominantly monochromatic in nature with black, greys, and browns.

- Muscelos del Cuerpo (The muscles of the body), 2011, Woodblock print with graphite and stencil, 22''x29''
- Chihuahua, 2012, Wood Engraving, 27''x30''
- Paisaje (Landscape), 2011, Woodblock Print, 29''x44''
- Giraffe with Tire, 2012, Wood Engraving, 29''x27''
- Paisaje de Memoria, Color Lithograph, 2015, Collaborating printer: Maria Erikson
- Sonar Caribe, Color Lithograph with graphite stencil, 2015, Collaborating printer: Justin Andrews
- La Libertad se Defiende y se Muere por Ella, 2015, Three-color lithograph, Paper Type: Soft white Somerset satin, 18''x24'', Collaborating Printer: Bill Lagattuta, Edition of 15
- Sin Titulo (Untitled), 2016
- Mural for Auckland Airport, Otahuhu College Art Students and Osmeivy Ortega Pacheco created the mural for the international airport of Auckland, 2017-2018
- Untitled, 2012, Woodcut print on archival paper, 39 1/2'' x 27 ½''

== Exhibitions ==
He has exhibited throughout Cuba, including at the Havana Biennial. Ortega completed a residency at the Tamarind Institute in 2015 and held an exhibition. His artwork has been presented and displayed at the following institutions: Cleveland Institute of Art, Museum of Contemporary Art Cleveland, Art Museum of the Americas, New Mexico's Tamarind Institute, and the London Print Studio.

Solo Shows
Exhibition	Organization	Location	Date
Portfolio series: Osmeivy Ortega	Museum of Latin American Art - MOLAA	Long Beach, California, USA	May 11, 2019 - October 13, 2019
82°W / Six Degrees of Separation: Pop-Up Exhibit – Woodcuts by Osmeivy Ortega	Gainesville's Gallery Protocol	Gainesville, Florida	January 14, 15, 16 (no year)

Group Shows
Exhibition	Organization	Location	Date
Cuban Printmakers: Osmeivy Ortega Pacheco and Sandra Ramos	Childs Gallery	Boston, Massachusetts, USA	July 9, 2013 - August 21, 2013
Childs Gallery at IFPDA Print Fair	Childs Gallery	Boston, Massachusetts, USA	November 6, 2013 - November 9, 2013
20/20: Contemporary Cuban Printmaking	Highpoint Center for Printmaking	Minneapolis, Minnesota, USA	February 28, 2020 - April 11, 2020

== Honors and awards ==
Osmeivy Ortega Pacheco received both the Honorable Mention award from the Tamarind Institute of the University of New México in 2004, and the Special Mention award from the 10th La Joven Estampa Prize in 2009.

== Bibliography ==
- Ashraf, Arooj. "CIA brings 5 Cuban artists to Cleveland." La Prensa, October 21, 2011, Vol.50.
- Encuentro Nacional de Grabado 2004, Encuentro Nacional de Grabado, University of Virginia, 2004.
- Landis, Stefan. Lithography: main techniques. London : ISTE; Hoboken, N.J.,2011.
- McQueeney-Jones-Mascolo, Frances. "Sales Robust At AD 20/21." Antinques and the Arts Weekly, April 16, 2013.
- Ortega, Osmeivy (@osmeivyortega). 2021. Instagram.
