= Fernando Velázquez =

Fernando Velázquez may refer to:

- Fernando Velázquez Vigil (1950–2002), Cuban artist specialising in ceramics and painting
- Fernando Velázquez (composer) (born 1976), Spanish composer of concert and orchestral music
