= Manuel Carbonell =

Cuban artist (1918–2011)

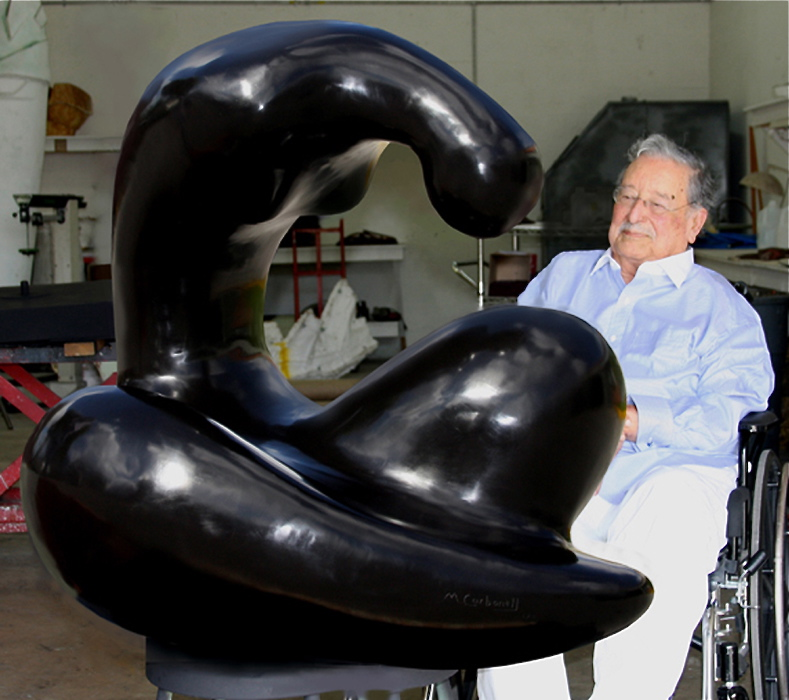
- Carbonell with "Madonna of the Moon" at the foundry in Miami, Florida
- Born: October 25, 1918; Sancti Spíritus, Cuba
- Died: November 10, 2011 (aged 93); Coral Gables, Florida, United States
- Education: Escuela Nacional de Bellas Artes "San Alejandro" in Havana, Cuba
- Known for: monumental bronze sculptures, sculptures, bas-reliefs, drawings, and historical public monuments
- Style: Contemporary Figurative Abstract bronze sculptures

Manuel Carbonell (October 25, 1918 – November 10, 2011) was a Cuban Contemporary and Modern artist, regarded as among the greatest Cuban sculptors of his generation. He was part of the generation of Cuban artists that includes Wifredo Lam and Agustín Cárdenas, that studied at the Escuela Nacional de Bellas Artes "San Alejandro", Havana, Cuba. Carbonell's inexhaustible vision and his ever-changing style is the product of a brilliant talent with an academic background. Ceaselessly searching for the essence of form and the absence of details, he empowered a sense of strength and monumentality to his work. Until the age of 92, he had continued to work daily in his studio.

== Childhood ==
Carbonell was born on October 25, 1918, in Sancti Spiritus ("Holy Spirit"), Cuba. He had two sisters: the older was Josephine and the younger Angela. His father came from a family of 18 brothers and sisters. The family history has its roots in early sugar farming, from the early 1800s.

At an early age the family moved to the city of Cienfuegos and Carbonell went to study at "Monserrat" a primary school in the city. This proved to be the beginning of many lasting friendships. Since his early childhood he was recognized for his interest in drawings and carvings. Continuing on to his more formative academic years, in Havana he attended El Colegio de Belen, a Jesuit preparatory school, where he excelled in the classes involving art and history.

== Creativity ==
Carbonell first realized he wanted to be a sculptor when he was eight or nine years old. He was always making little figures with clay and whenever he found a piece of paper, he would doodle little figures on it. His harshest punishment as a child was when his mother took away his pencils and paper. Having the understanding that a piece of paper could be torn apart and disappear, ingrained in him that permanence could be achieved better by sculpting. Depression would set in when he was not involved in the process of creation. Quoting him, "Something curious happens to me when I sit down to begin the process of translating the images in my imagination into this third dimension. I see the whole piece finished, actually totally finished, in my minds eye, even before I begin. But, as we all know, imagination can be very treacherous."

== Education ==
In 1937, he wanted to learn about art and found out about "San Alejandro", the renowned Escuela Nacional de Bellas Artes (National Academy of Fine Arts) in Havana. When he arrived, they asked him what previous training he had had. Explaining, he told them he had none. The school wanted him to go through a preliminary process for two years prior to attending, however he managed to prove himself with a clay carving that he had made that following weekend and they accepted him as a student on the spot. Carbonell was 18 years old and barely beginning at San Alejandro when he fell down some stairs. The injury was very severe; one of his kidneys had ruptured as a result of the impact. He spent nearly one year partly paralyzed, unable to move easily. He could not attend classes of course, the despair he felt, lying there, all that time was immeasurable. But little by little he learned to walk again, he just stubbornly refused to give up, finally able to return to San Alejandro. At the Academy, Carbonell studied under the guidance of Juan José Sicre, a former student of Antoine Bourdelle, Rodin's favorite disciple. In 1945, at the age of 27, Carbonell graduated with the title of Professor of Drawing and Sculpture. Carbonell met and worked alongside some great artists, Fidelio Ponce, Victor Manuel, Amelia Pelaez, Roberto Estopiñan and many others. At San Alejandro, artistic excellence meant one must measure up to maximum standards or smash it into pieces and start again, that was the norm.

== Beginnings as a sculptor ==
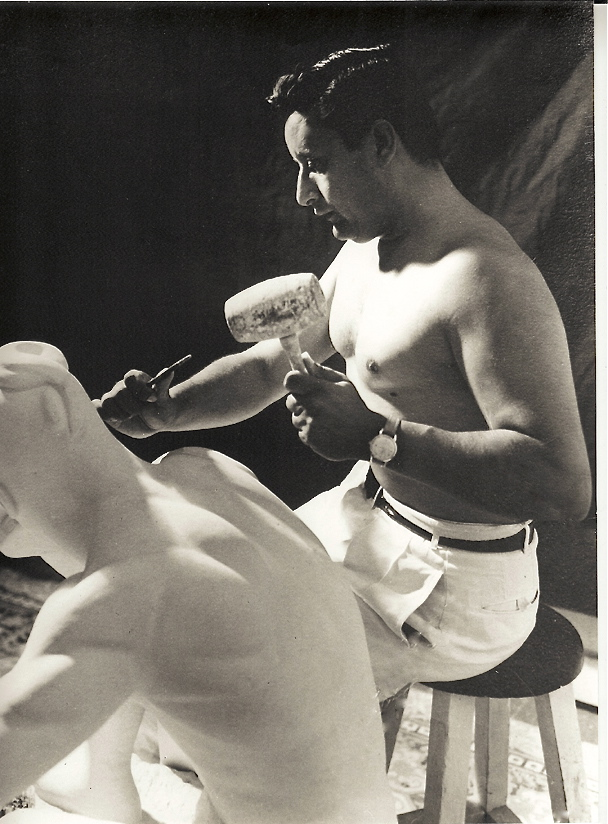
Carbonell carving out of Capellania stone, typical of Cuba, this resembles granite because of its density.

His classical and religious period developed between 1945 and 1959 some of his many important commissions included the stone carvings as bas-reliefs of the Twelve Stations of the Cross, along with The Last Rites located at Las Lomas Del Jacan in San Miguel de los Baños, Matanzas province. Last Rites, was exhibited at the National Capitol in Havana. He also sculpted a statue of the Virgin Mary for the Association of Catholic University students in Havana. A life size wood carving of a crucifixion for the chapel at the Covadonga sugar mill in Las Villas, Cuba.

Carbonell's work received immediate recognition. Dr. Roberto Lopez-Goldaras, the art critic of Havana's Diario De La Marina, in Havana, said in 1951 about his work, "We foresee for the young and distinguished sculptor Manuel Carbonell a great future; (he) who had been able to conceive a sculpture like "Eternity", will without a doubt, earn himself a glorious name, which is already a euphoric name, accredited among the literary and artistic names of Cuba."

Carbonell participated in numerous national competitions and was the recipient of many awards. The life-size stone carving Fin de Una Raza (End of A Race) earned him his first international award in 1954, for the III Bienal Hispanoamericana de Arte, in Barcelona, Spain. The sculpture became part of the collection of the Museum of Fine Arts in Havana; it appeared on the cover of Reader's Digest magazine in May 1956.

== Professional journey ==
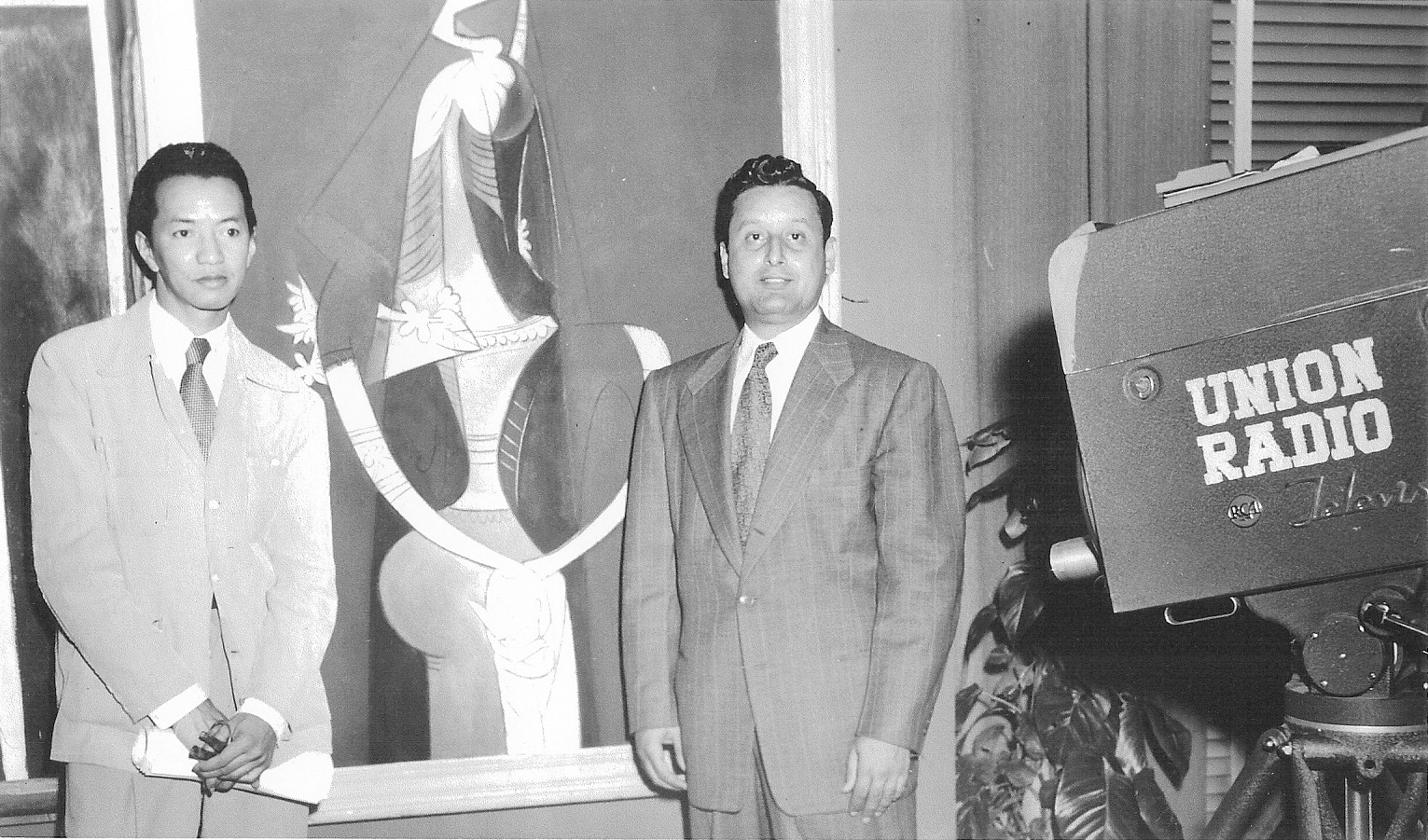
Manuel Carbonell (right) with Wifredo Lam.

For the first commercial television broadcast, "Union Radio Television", Carbonell was the host and interviewer for a weekly television program where he interviewed artist as his topic of discussion, to include Wifredo Lam, among others. He worked in various aspects of television and production whereby he won an award in set design for the "Union De La Cronica Tele-Radial Diaria" in the second festival. By 1954 Carbonell left for Europe visiting countless museums with the goal of experiencing for himself the opportunity to stand in front of great masterpieces to appreciate them and learn. He was able to explore countries such as Spain, Italy, France and England and understand their unique cultures. Europe proved to inspire Carbonell as he studied the art of the Impressionist and Abstract artists, which inspired a change in direction to give form a sense of movement.

In addition to his accomplishments as a sculptor, he owned an operated his own interior design business "Carbonell Studio". Here he designed from French to Modern furniture. He also had a high-end luxury boutique of decorative objects. After the Cuban Revolution, he wished to defect, and he was granted a visa to travel to the United States.

== Exile to New York City ==
In 1959, Carbonell fled Cuba where he could no longer live under a totalitarian regime (see Cuban Revolution.) Leaving behind his wealth, his established positions, his sculptures, and his family. He arrived in New York City with only $200 in cash and initially took up residency at the YMCA.

Carbonell moved away from his classical and religious period, in Cuba in the late 1940s and 1950s through the commencement and development of his modern expressions of the 1960s.

Although at the beginning deeply depressed, this new trajectory first moved him to a unique form of figurative abstraction where the anatomy was subjected to the anatomical elongation of the subject matter.

Carbonell began his career in the United States unexpectedly. As payment to his then public relations manager Ted Materna and Associates he provided one of his first sculptures in clay that he had created. Dr. Paul Henkind, then Chief of the Department of Ophthalmology at Monte Fiore Hospital, NYC, notably mistook the sculpture for a work by Auguste Rodin. He visited Carbonell's studio in SoHo where he purchased one of his sculptures and became long-term collector of his work.

Shortly after in 1961, Manuel Carbonell was introduced to Dr. Fred Schoneman, the influential and renowned gallery owner, who was impressed with what he saw of Carbonell's work, and invited him to become the gallery's first and only sculptor and he is quoted saying: "He is indeed, as the critics have acclaimed and posterity will confirm, one of the Masters of Sculpture of our times." The gallery exhibited Carbonell's sculptures alongside European Masters and French Impressionist paintings of the 19th and 20th centuries, such as Braque, Chagall, Monet, Degas, Pissarro, Picasso, Gauguin, Renoir and others. Professional artistic success came with his new figuration sculptures when in 1963, he celebrated the first of his several "One Man Show" at the renowned Schoneman Gallery, Madison Avenue, in New York City, and collaborated in One Man Shows with other galleries, exceeding ten years, until Dr. Schonemans' passing.

For his first exhibition at Schoneman Galleries, Carbonell departed from clay and plaster forms and worked in hammered metals. During this time, one sensed the influence of Pablo Gargallos' figurative abstract modern sculptures. In 1967 he extended his frontier to include another one-man show in San Francisco at the Maxwell Galleries. By 1971, Carbonell held two exhibitions, one again at Schoneman and the other at the Bacardi Galleries in Miami, Florida. At this time, Carbonell moved from his previously acclaimed hammered metals and bronze finishes to high-polished bronzes sculptures. This new work took on a completely different aesthetic, becoming more abstract. Rounded volumes replaced the elongated anatomical shapes, present in "Lovers", "Madonna of the Moon" and "Figurative Form". During an exhibition at Galerie Moos, in 1972, in Montreal, Canada, the artist unveiled new subject matters through his high-polish bronze sculptures of "Sea Horses, a Sea Lion, Snail and Mermaid".

Renamed as Randall Galleries, a former employee of Schoneman Galleries took control over the gallery in 1973, while Carbonell was preparing an exhibition that would pay tribute to dance. The dancer series was a means to show his appreciation of dance as an art form, embracing the two art forms. The delicate lines of the ballet dancers are executed from a single point of balance. The graceful forms portray the excitement of their movement and beauty which is captured in reflective golden bronze. The opportunity to amplify this series turned into a benefit for The City Center in New York City to have an exhibition titled Homage to Ballet in 1974.

== Reuniting with family ==
In 1960, Carbonell took in his two nephews, Ricardo aged 15 and Luis aged 13, to live with him in New Jersey to save them from being inducted into Castro's military army. Soon enough, nine months later his father Manuel and his sisters Angela and Josefina with her two-year-old daughter, Clara, were able to leave Cuba and come to Miami. After so many years living apart Carbonell was anxious to rejoin his family, he moved his studio to Miami in 1976. Keeping a much lower profile he continued creating and selling his sculptures and concentrated on important private commissions. During 1977 Carbonell was given the challenge to construct the "Virgin of Fatima", for the Blue Army Shrine, in Washington, New Jersey. The 26-foot, 12,000 pound bronze sculpture was placed on top of a 150-foot shrine, considered one of the largest sculptures cast in America in the 20th century. His first commissioned bronze monument in the United States: A special and personal monumental sculpture during this same time was a composition of a 10-foot in height horse and rider, balanced on two points, which was commissioned by Burt Reynolds of himself for the entrance of the Burt Reynolds Jupiter Theatre, Jupiter, Florida. The two men had a very fond and enduring friendship.

The awards formally presented by The South Florida Entertainment Writers Associations (SFEWA), an organization of major media theater critics from Dade, Broward and Palm Beach Counties, on November 15, 1976, they selected Carbonell as the namesake. He was the creator of the award and The Estate of Manuel Carbonell continues to be the major benefactor of the "Carbonell Awards". They represent the highest achievement awards that annually recognizes and honors excellence in South Florida theater. The organization considered this tribute to Carbonell, as he signified and represented one who devotes his life to art.

In 1976, Carbonell held a monographic exhibit at the Metropolitan Museum and Art Center, in Miami, Florida, on view at the opening of their newest gallery, where he introduced more than 20 of his latest works. (Now incorporated into, The Frost Art Museum). Between the late 1970s and mid-1980s, the artist worked on private commissions and ventured creatively in designing jewelry and furniture. At that time, he had several one-man shows that were also presented at different galleries during this decade, including Steiner Gallery in Bal Harbor, West Avenue Gallery in Palm Beach, Camino Real in Boca Raton, all in Florida and the Ann Jacob Gallery, in Marietta, Georgia.

== The White House ==
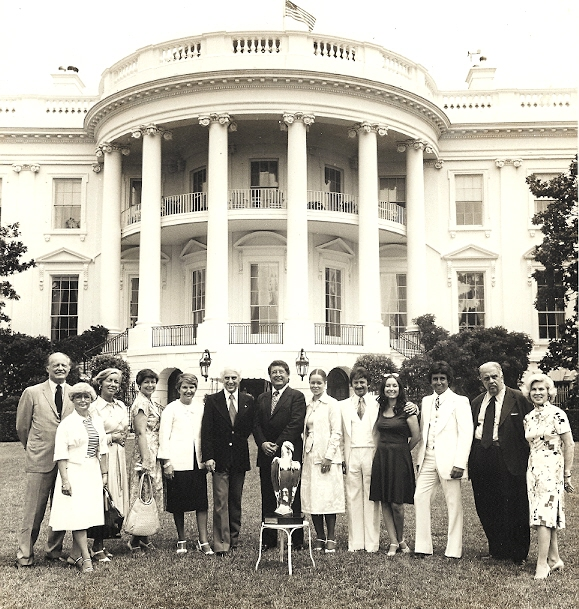
Internationally known Cuban Sculptor Manuel Carbonell, presenting his bronze eagle, as a symbol of freedom.

In 1976 Carbonell created the "Bicentennial Eagle", which he gifted to the United States of America, during a ceremony on the West Lawn of the White House in honor of the nation's Bicentennial Anniversary. During the bicentennial celebrations the sculpture was on display in the Great Hall of Commerce in Washington D.C. This sculpture is now part of The Gerald R. Ford, Presidential Library, Ann Arbor, Michigan, which is technically a branch office of The National Archives and Records Administration Collection, that the Federal government oversees.

== Beaux Arts Gallery ==
A formal representation begun in 1987 as Beaux Arts Gallery, Miami Florida, became the exclusive worldwide representative of Carbonell's work, under the Owner/Director, Ricardo J. Gonzalez III, an architect and Carbonell's nephew.

During the following years, his endless creative imagination took him to follow in the steps of European Masters such as Moore, Brancusi, and Arp and other artist of the figurative abstract movement. In Carbonells' sculptures you can experience the monumentality of the works of Henry Moore, and the simplicity found in the works of Brancusi, Archipenko and Arp, but in his oeuvre, he sought a different form of figuration, where he searched for the essence of the form and the absence of details while empowering a feeling of monumentality to his sculptures. At this time Carbonell moved from his high polished bronzes to dark patinas. His figurative abstract sculptures created an impression or illusion of form and space, which are representational and based on the anatomical simplification of the form from a variety of sources. His distinctive personal style is easily identifiable and recognized by the consistency in the originality of his works, the uniqueness of his interpretations and the sense of universal appeal that he imparted to his sculptures.

The years between 1987 and 1988 marked a very creative and productive period for Carbonell. Lovers, mother and child, dancers and the female figure intensified as subject matter in his artistic vision. He redefined forms and contours, while maintaining the anatomical essence of the human figure, bringing female sensuality to a point of abstraction, while displaying a sense of aesthetic basic principles in a simplified form. A continuance of one-man shows and exhibits along with art fairs nationally and internationally have since to date been part of this relationship.

Having won a competition in 1989 to create a statue of the Cuban Apostle Jose Martí for the San Carlos Institute in Key West, Florida. Carbonell returned for this commission to his classical period to create the statue.

A subject very close to Carbonell's heart: the artist struggled with the challenge of translating the human Martí into the idealized and heroic universal figure that Martí's philosophy and spirituality represented. Conquering this challenge, in 1990 Carbonell moved to Pietrasanta, (Holy Stone) Italy to carve a 6-foot marble sculpture that portrays Martí with his left arm extended, as if to greet visitors, while the right hand rest on a bundle of wheat surrounded by the Cuban flag. The symbolism conveyed by the statue is that a cause, like one stalk of wheat, may become weak, but becomes strong when its supporters band together.

== The Miami River Bridge ==
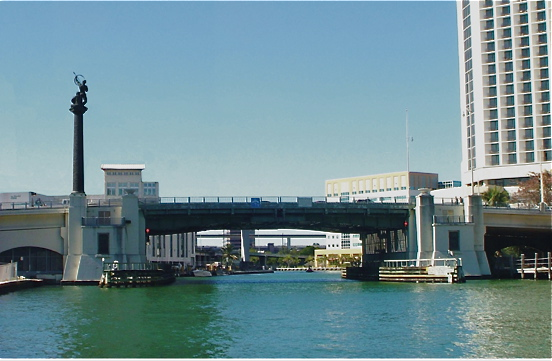
This bridge on Brickell Avenue was the first time that the Florida Dept. of Transportation incorporated architecture, art and engineering in a bridge design.

Carbonell was selected in a competition in 1992, this was to create one of the largest bronze monuments in the State of Florida, the artwork for Miami's Brickell Avenue Bridge, Miami Florida. Carbonell created the 53-foot bronze public monument "The Pillar of History and the Tequesta Family", located mid-span on the bridge. The pillar illustrates a carved graphical narration of the lives of the Tequesta Indians, Miami's first inhabitants, featuring 150 figures. At the top stands a 17-foot bronze sculpture, "Tequesta Family" portraying a Tequesta Indian warrior aiming an arrow to the sky with his wife and child at his side. In the niches at the supporting piers are four 4-foot by 8-foot bronze bas reliefs honoring the quintessential Miami pioneers Henry Flagler, Dana A. Dorsey, William and Mary Brickell, Marjory Stoneman Douglas and Julia Tuttle, depicting them in their historical perpetual settings. Twelve bronze bas-reliefs of Florida fauna are located at the base of the flagpoles on the walk ways of both sides of the bridge.

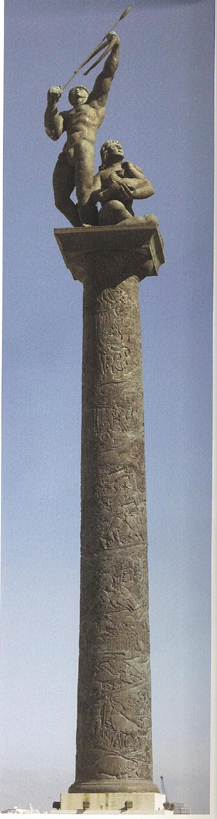
This Historical Landmark serves as a lesson on the history of Miami.

"Little Miracles", certainly an invaluable opportunity, I was in love with the project, first because the Tequesta's are a fascinating people, secondly, because it was an important monument, with such tremendous dimensions. I am convinced that, previously, long ago, there were many civilizations more advanced than ours, who knew how to enjoy the beauty of the soul. While I was in Pietrasanta, Italy to commence this two-year project, having finished all the bas-reliefs and having completed carving 3/5 of the pillar, I suffered a stroke. My left side was paralyzed, and being left-handed I was desperate. I kept asking the medical staff, "listen, when can I once again begin to move my arm, I am a sculptor", the reply "be patient" which I am not. On the one hand, I would tell myself, "look Carbonell, you are no longer a sculptor, you have been a sculptor for more than seventy years, but you are no longer a sculptor now". "Your left hand is paralyzed". "Nobody can change that". It's absurd but on the other hand, since I couldn't accept that, I would say, "yes, I can, I can change that". The doctors released me from the hospital so I could emotionally feel better and come back in a couple of months to start my physical therapy. Ten days later, I told my assistants to bring the unfinished portion and get me my tools, and bring them to the house because I wanted to start carving again. Shortly thereafter, my therapy nurse that came to my house spread the news I was astonishing. All my friends from the hospital arrived, they couldn't believe that I was already working, ok, maybe not with my left hand, but I was surely working with my right hand. "My life is my work. And my work is my life."

== Other monuments to follow ==
Between 1996 and 1999, Carbonell remained in Pietrasanta working on two commissions for monumental sculptures: "El Centinela del Rio", a 21-foot bronze sculpture depicting a Tequesta Indian blowing into a bronze and alabaster conch shell. The sculpture is located at Tequesta Point on Brickell Key. Serving as a welcoming site to all and luminous at night, at the entrance of the Miami River. Another is "The Manatee Fountain", consisting of three Indian children playing with two manatees, located at the walkway between, Two and Three Tequesta Point condominiums on Brickell Key, Miami, Florida. Swire Properties and Manuel Carbonell had a unique patronage, not only is there "The Swire Art Trust", there was the "Swire Carbonell Scholarship Fund" for the Florida International University Foundation.

His modern monumental works, created in his unique and distinctive personal style, are part of important art collections and public spaces, "Couple in Love" adorns the lobby of the Mandarin Oriental Hotel, Miami, "Lovers" is located at the entrance of the Carbonell Condominium, named in the artist honor, "Torso" formally at Selby's Five Point Park, downtown Sarasota then at the von Liebig Art Center in Naples, Florida. "New Generation" is in Xujianhui Park, Shanghai, China. The sculpture of " Amantes" now graces the grounds of The Buenaventura Golf and Beach Resort Panama, under the Autograph Collection of J.W. Marriott, Republic of Panama. "Abrazo" and "Couple in Love" enhance the first Ritz Carlton Hotel, in Bangalore, India. "Mother and Child" together with "Amantes" are amongst the garden of Château de Vullierens, Vullierens, Switzerland, and "Birth of Eve" at the entrance rotunda of Brickell Key Two Condominium, Miami, Florida.

== Later life ==
Manuel Carbonell died at Kindred Hospital in Coral Gables, Florida, on November 10, 2011, at the age of 93. He was survived by his two sisters, Josefina Gonzalez and Angela Carbonell; niece, Clara Falcon; and nephews, Ricardo and Luis Gonzalez. His funeral mass was held at the chapel of Belen Jesuit Preparatory School in Miami. The sentiment of having the service take place at Belen was because Carbonell created and contributed to most everything in the chapel.

== Gallery ==
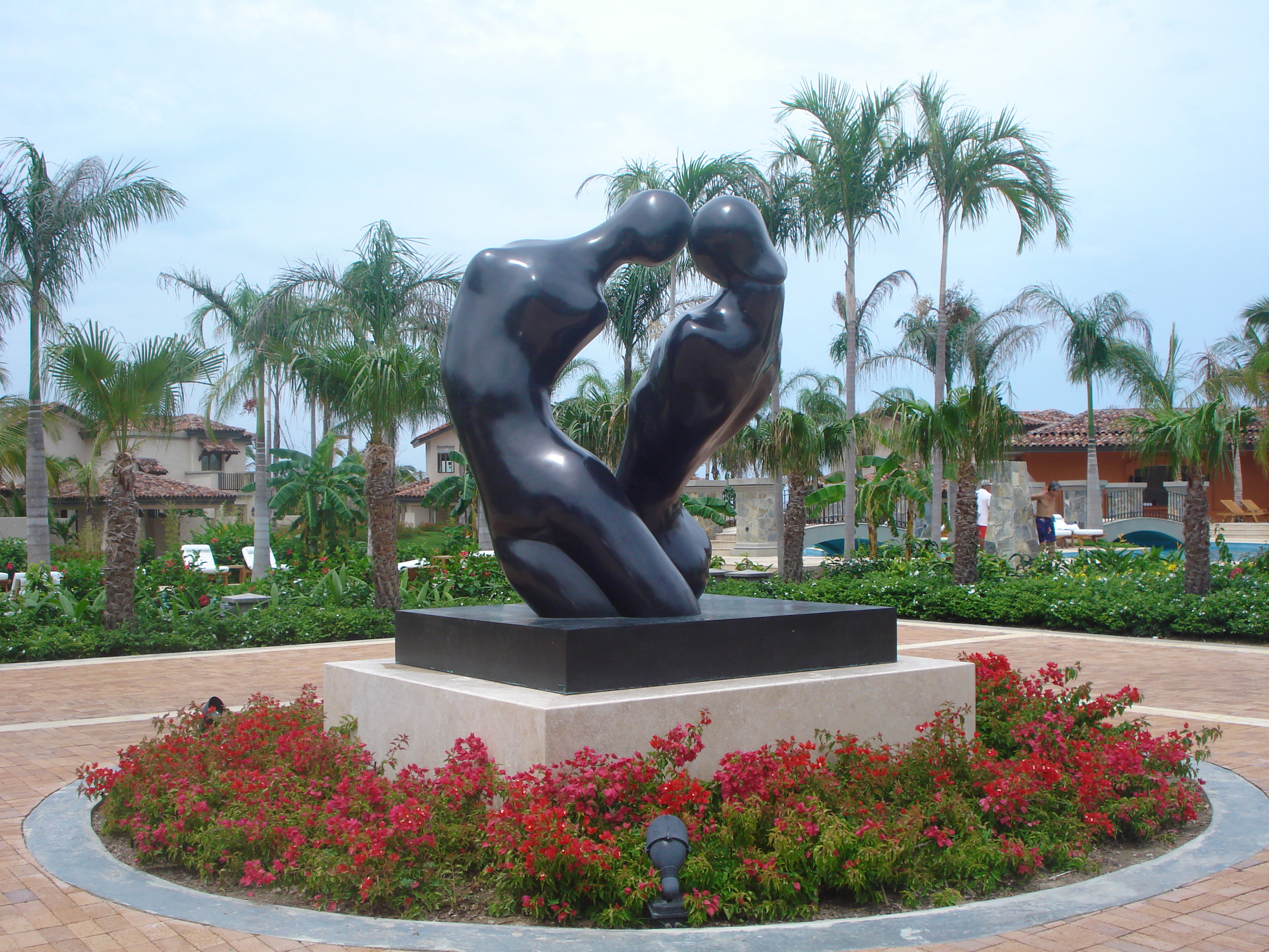
"Amantes", for the former Hotel Bristol, Now owned by the Buenaventura Golf and Beach Resort Panama, Autograph Collection of J.W. Mario, located in Buenaventura, Panama. This sculpture is the focal point of the entrance of the hotel.

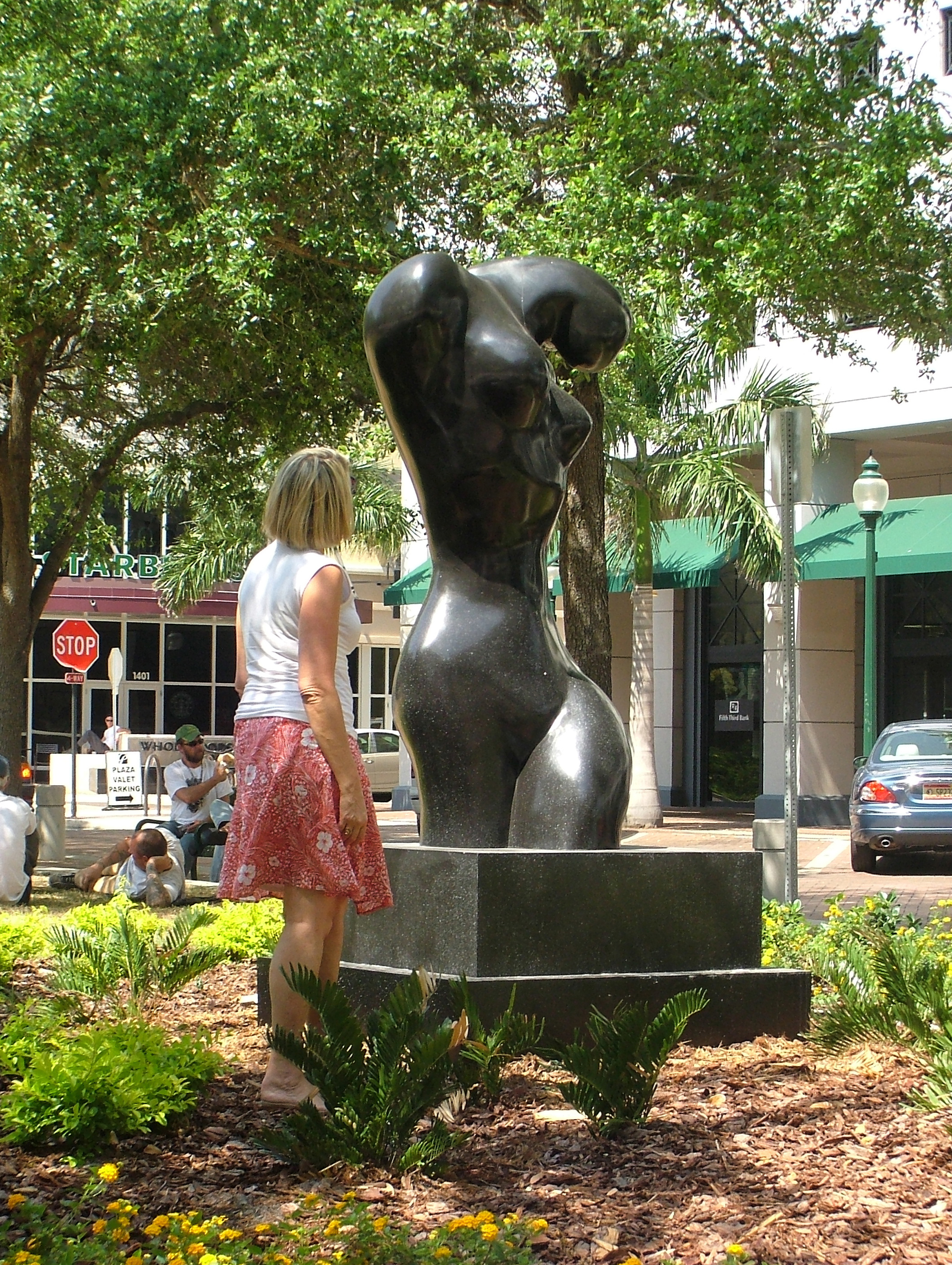
"Torso", After being exhibited at Sarasota's Season of Sculpture, the City of Sarasota placed the sculpture at Shelby's Five Point Park in the center of downtown Sarasota. Then relocated for a number of years at The von Liebig Art Center in Naples, Florida.

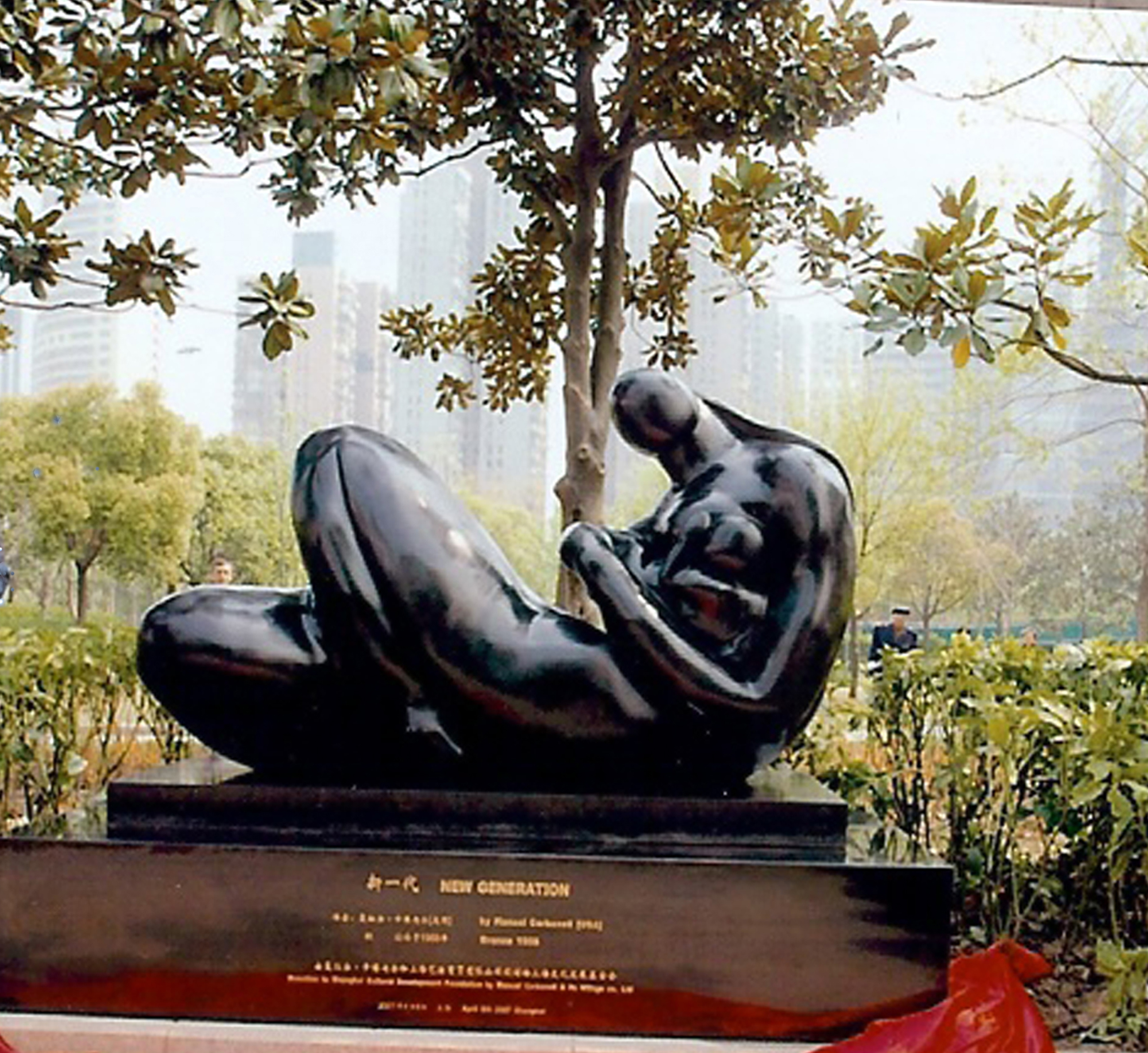
" New Generation", is collaboration between Beaux Arts gallery of Miami, Florida and the Shanghai Cultural Development Association of China. This Carbonell sculpture is located in Xujianhui Park, Shanghai, China. A formal unveiling ceremony took place April 6, 2007.

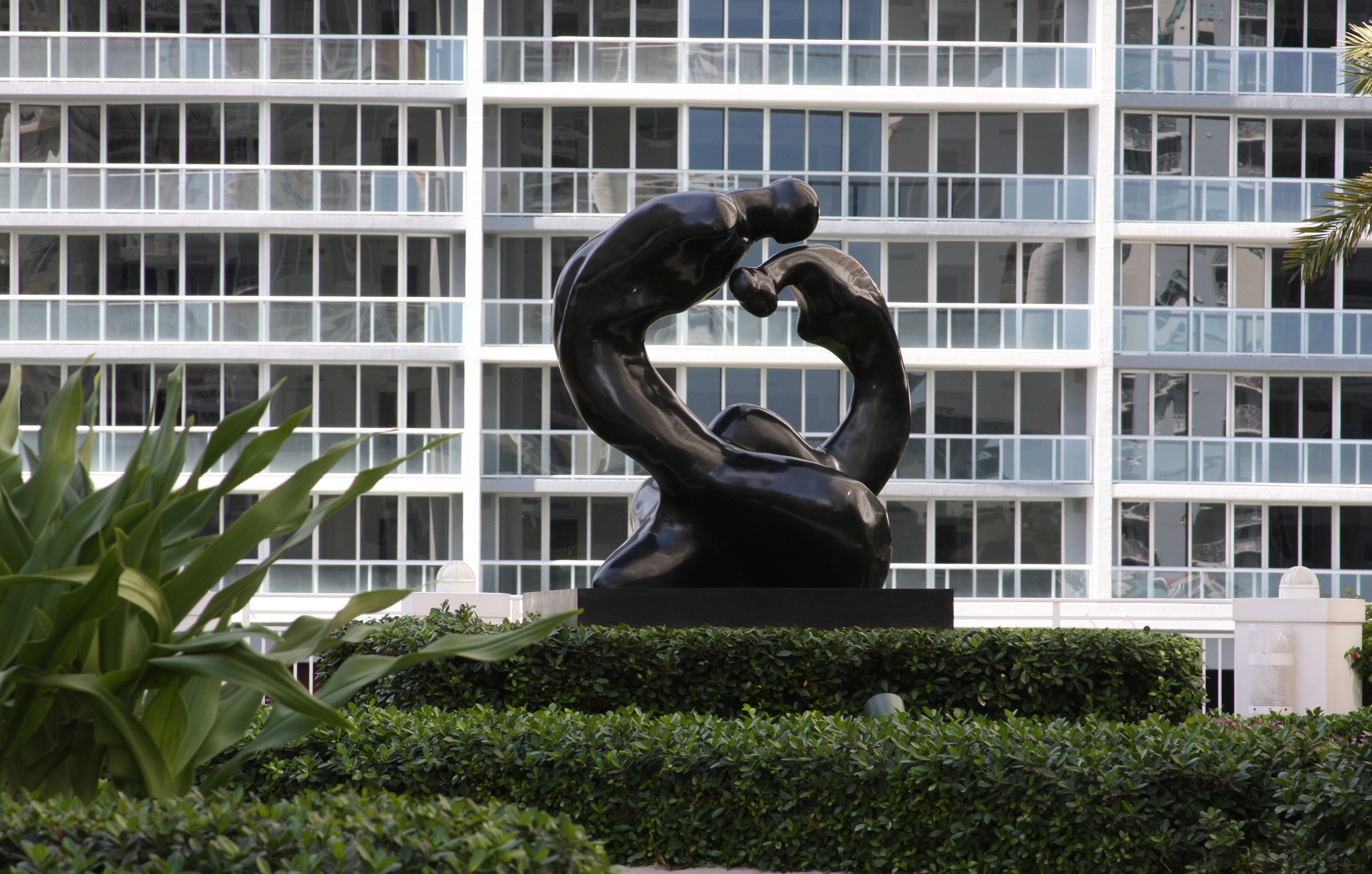
"Lovers", This sculpture adorns the entrance rotunda of the Carbonell Condominium. Swire Properties 10th residential building on Brickell Key, Miami, Florida, the 40-story, 284-unit building is named in honor of Carbonell, completed July 2005.

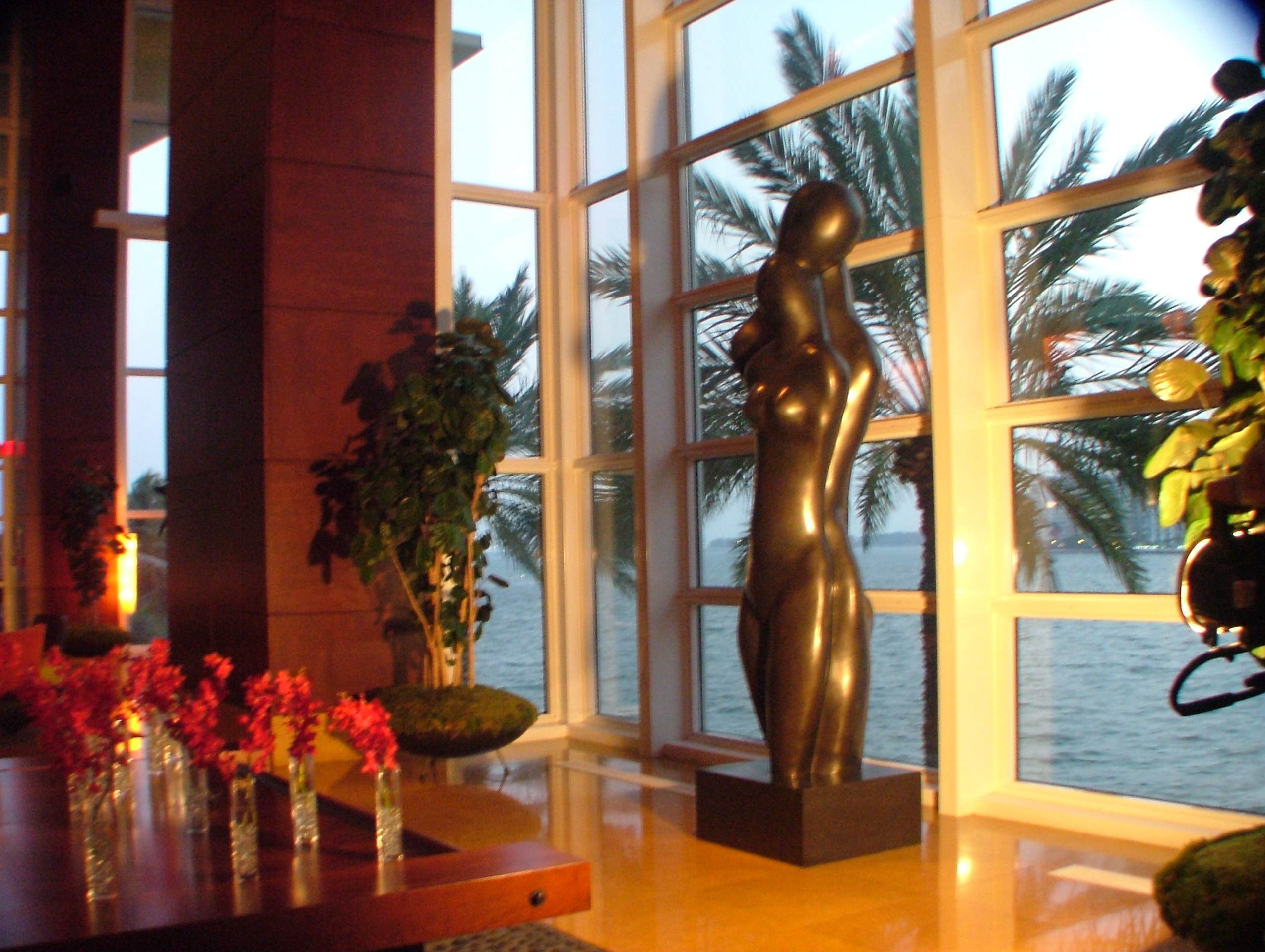
"Couple in Love", this sculpture is in the entrance lobby of the Mandarin Oriental Hotel. It shows Carbonell's infinite capacity to give form to extreme stylization without diminishing or adulterating the identity of the image or composition.

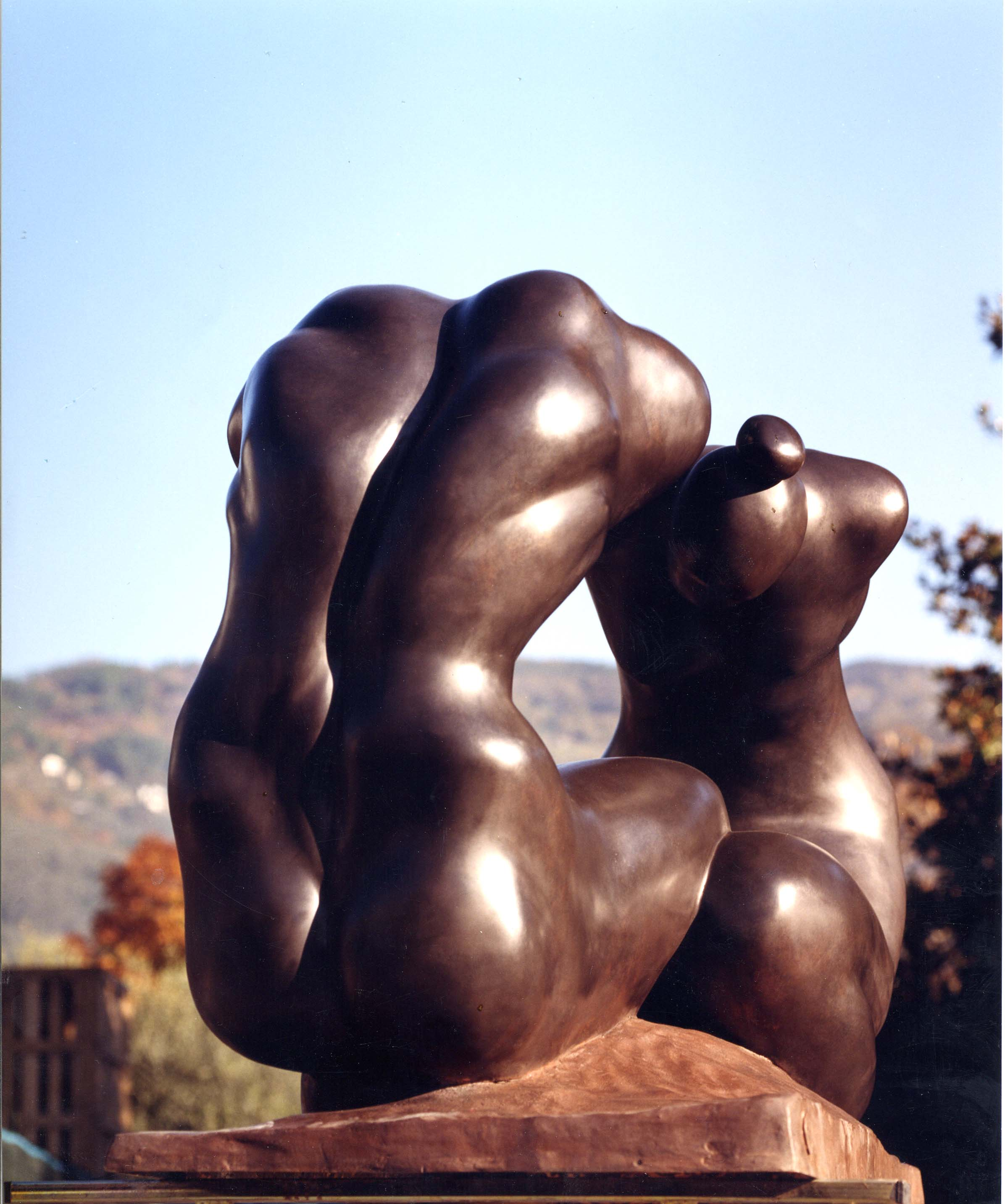
"Eternal Love", a perfect example of how Carbonell attains in his figures, qualities of illusion having abstract imagery and aesthetic, that possess a narrative essence while providing pure figurative execution.

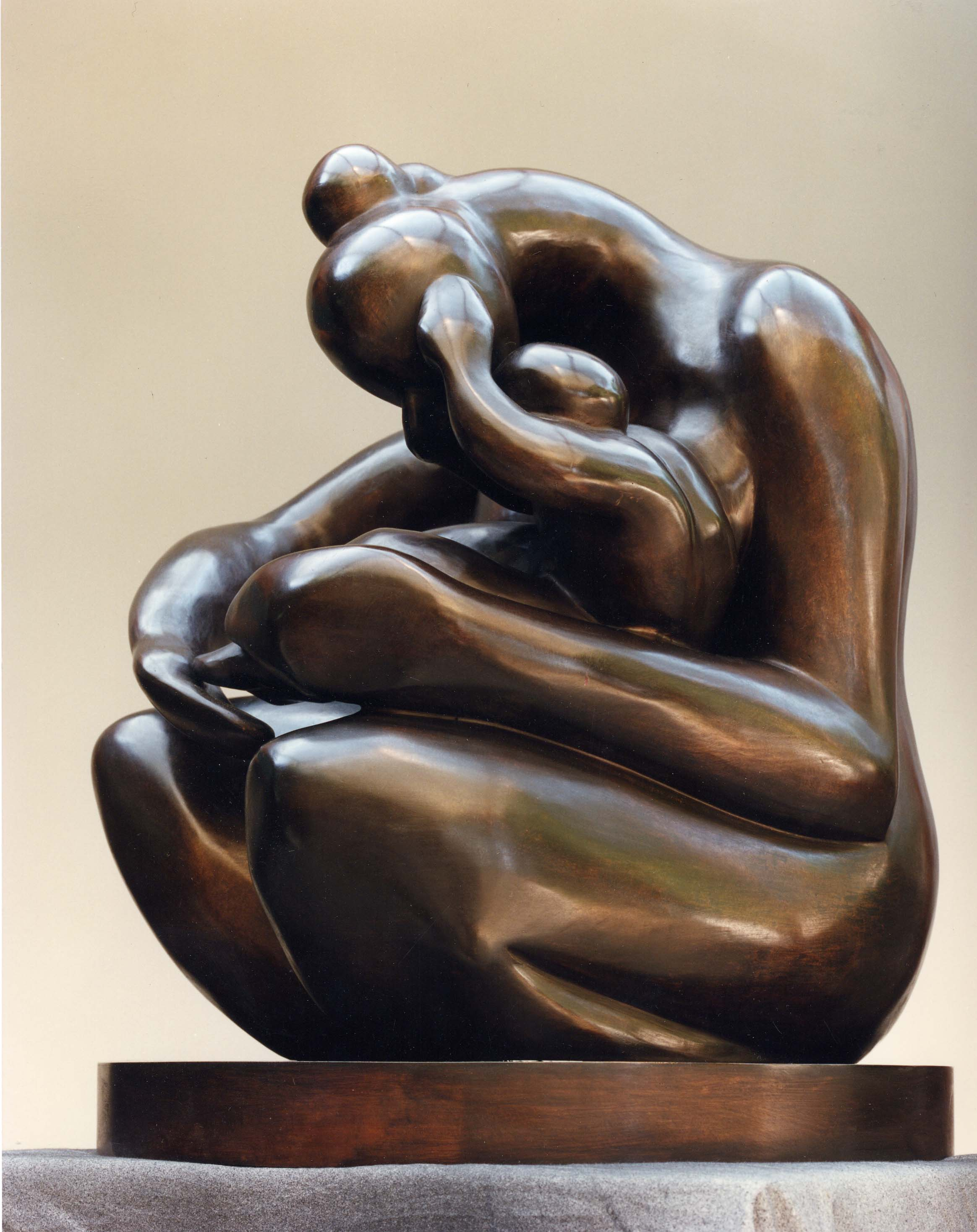
"Mother embracing Child", for Carbonell, depicting in this sculpture a warm embrace or a loving posture, evokes the bond of cultivating treasured affection between mother and child during their lifetime.

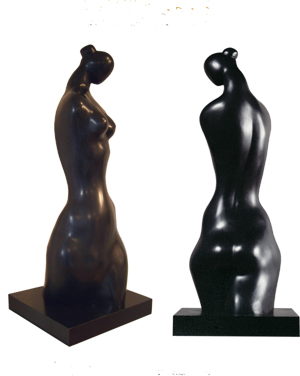
"Sensuous Form", embodied in Carbonell's sculptures are the physical significance carried out in simplicity, conveying anatomy and form.

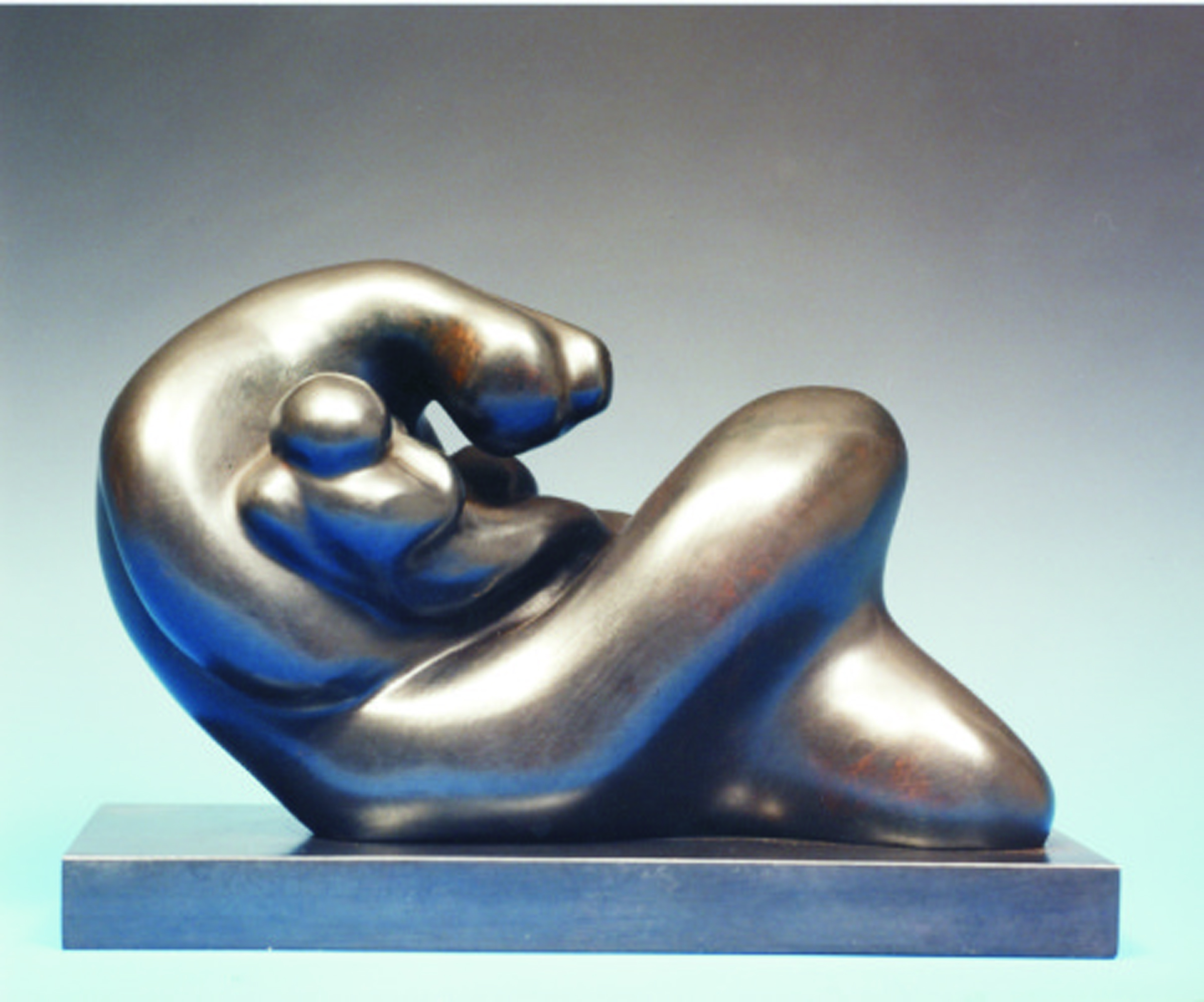
"New Generation", attributing a sense of monumentality that Carbonell imparts to his study in maquette's are a reflection of his vision, to be transformed into unique sensations of warmth and nurturing.

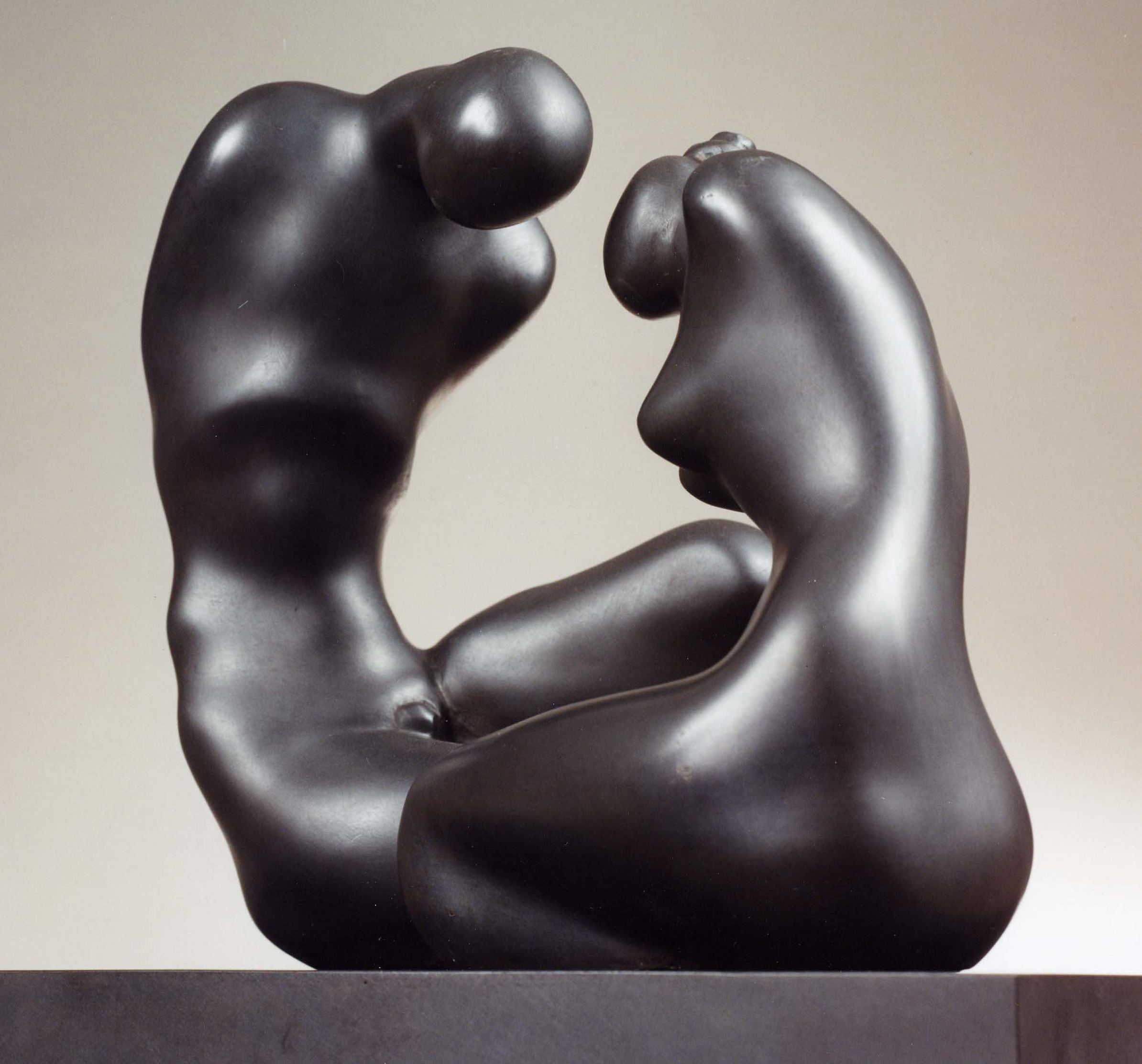
"Study of forms", Carbonell selects those maquettes, which challenge him to want to realize them into sculptures from dozens of study drawings. His refined sense of anatomy and his sublime capacity to fuse expression and form together allows the figurative.

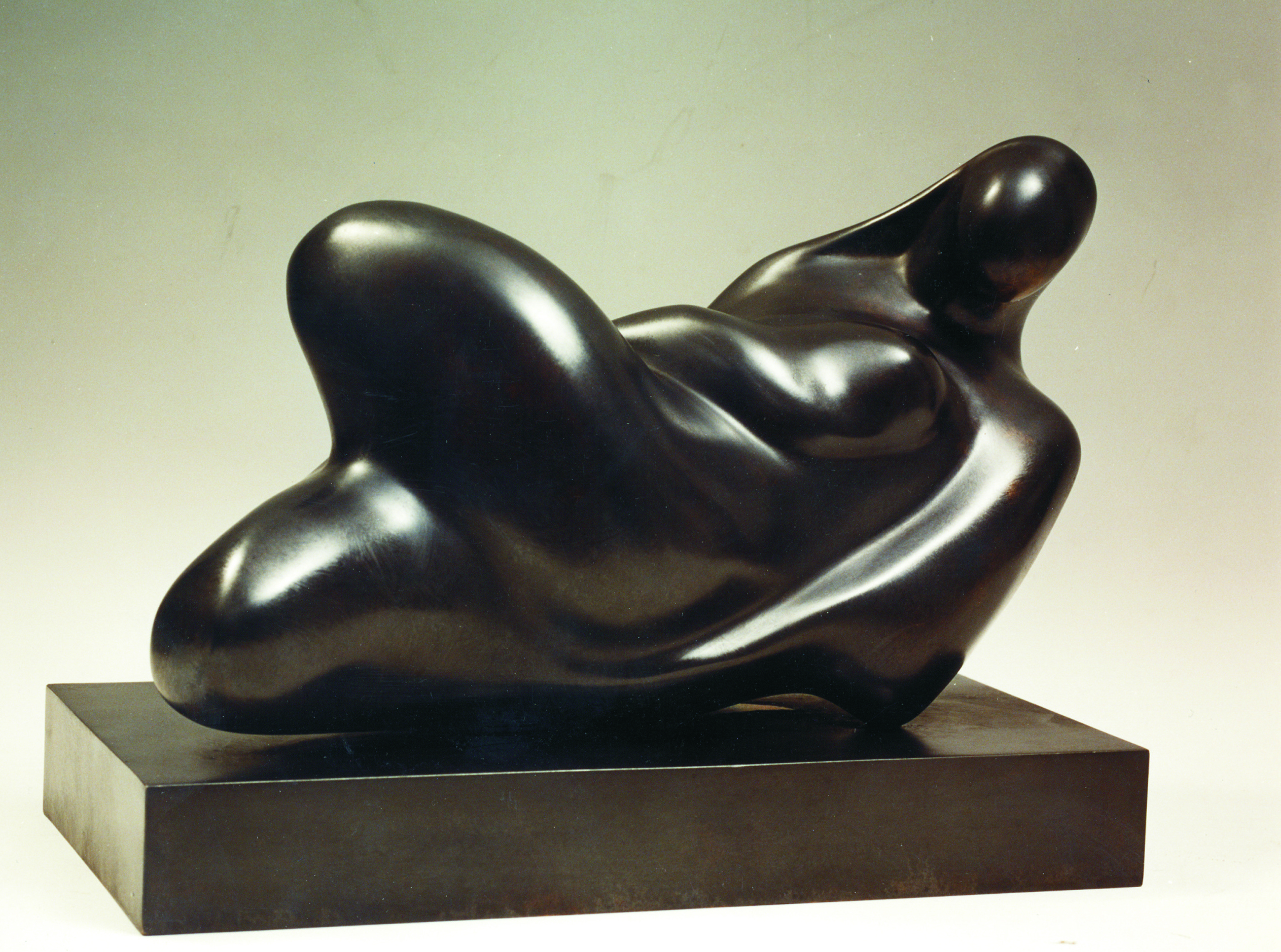
"Maternidad", is a perfect example of the relationship between mothers and children and has been a recurring theme in Carbonells sculptures. The feeling of love and tenderness that he imparts brings a unique sensation of affection.

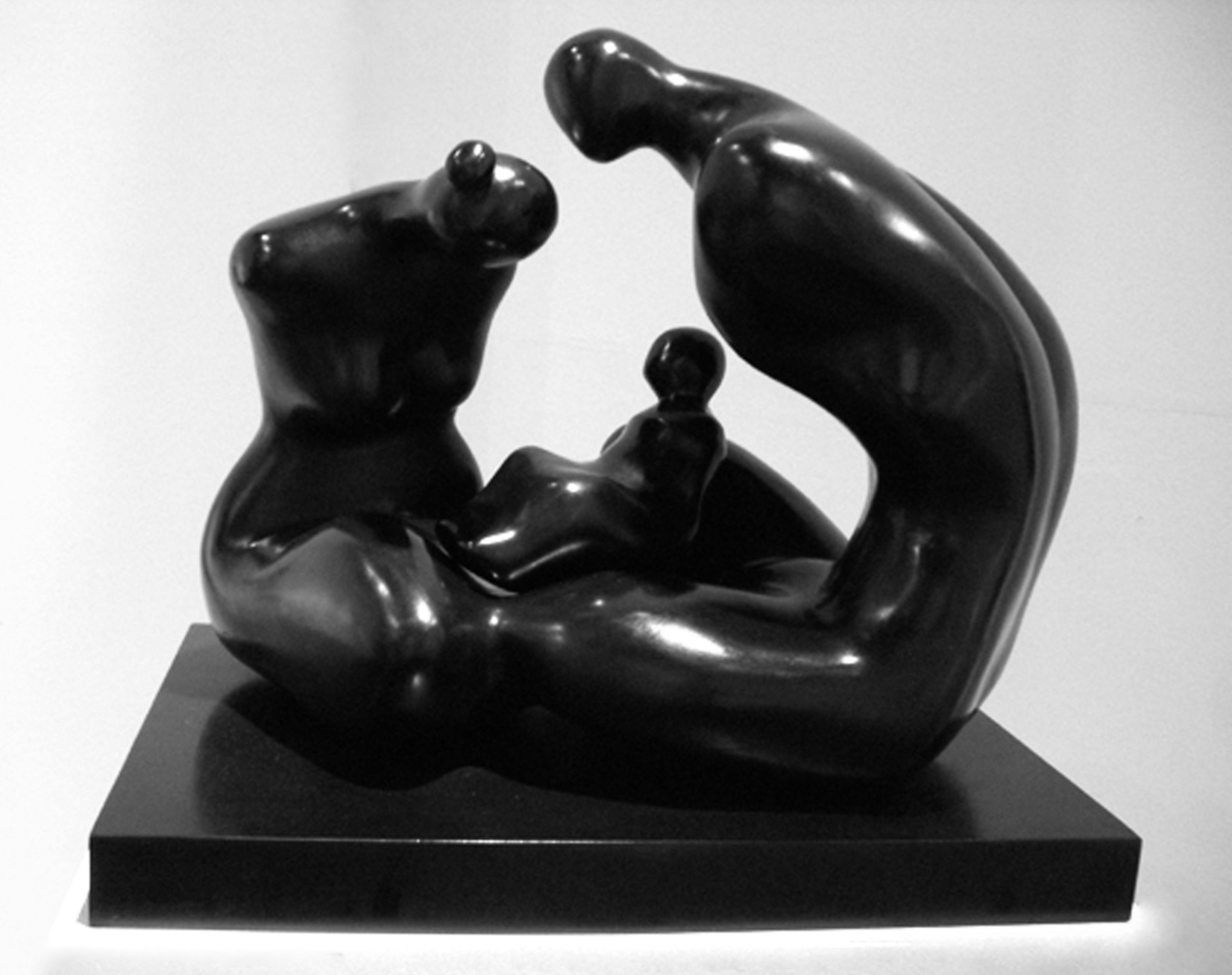
"Familia", in these studies for larger sculptures, a small size allows Carbonell to experiment more freely with the forms and concepts, bringing contemplation to the forefront.

== Exhibitions ==
- 1945: Carbonell graduates from the Escuela Nacional de Bellas Artes "San Alejandro" with the title of Professor of Drawing and Sculpture.
- 1948: Competition for Pieta and Twelve Stations of the Cross, San Miguel de los Banos, Cuba.
- 1949: Exposicion del Museo Nacional de Cuba, National Show, Havana.
- 1954: Bienal Hispanoamericana de Arte, International Show, Barcelona.
- 1954: Exposicion Del Museo de Bellas Artes, National Show, Havana.
- 1959: Carbonell goes into exile in New York.
- 1963: Schoneman Galleries, 63 East 57th Street New York, begins to represent Carbonell, First One Man Show at Schoneman Galleries.
- 1965: Schoneman Galleries, 63 East 57th Street. New York. Second One Man Show, to benefit the NSID Educational Foundation.
- 1967: Maxwell Galleries, One Man Show, San Francisco.
- 1968: Schoneman Galleries, 823 Madison Avenue, New York, Third One Man Show at Schoneman Galleries.
- 1971: Schoneman Galleries, 823 Madison Avenue, New York, Fourth One Man Show.
- 1971: Bacardi Gallery One Man Show, Miami, Florida.
- 1972: Galerie Moss, One Man Show, Montreal, Canada.
- 1972: Ann Jacob Gallery, One Man Show, Marietta, Georgia.
- 1973: Galeria Internacional, Group Show of Cuban Artists, Caracas, Venezuela.
- 1974: Jockey Club Gallery, One Man Show, Miami, Florida.
- 1974: Randall Galleries, 823 Madison Avenue, New York. One Man Show, "Hommage to Ballet" to benefit City Center, New York.
- 1976: The White House, South Lawn, Carbonell presents his Bicentennial Eagle to the United States of America.
- 1976: Metropolitan Museum and Art Center, One Man Show, Miami, Florida.
- 1976: Carbonell Awards, highest achievement award for the theater in South Florida is named in his honor.
- 1977: Worth Avenue Gallery, One Man Show, Palm Beach, Florida.
- 1977: Deligny Gallery, One Man Show, Fort Lauderdale, Florida.
- 1978: Blue Army Shrine commissions 26-foot Madonna of Fatima, Washington, N.J.
- 1978: Blue Army Shrine, completion and dedication.
- 1981: Steiner Gallery, One Man Show, Miami, Florida.
- 1982: Carbonell creates and donates the artwork for the chapel of Belen Jesuit Preparatory School, in Miami, Florida.
- 1983: Steiner Gallery, One Man Show, Miami, Florida.
- 1985: Steiner Gallery, One Man Show, Miami, Florida.
- 1986: Burt Reynolds Dinner Theater, 15-foot Sculpture of Horse and Rider, Jupiter, Florida.
- 1987: Beaux Arts Gallery, in Miami, Florida, starts representing Carbonell.
- 1987: Americana Collection, history of America depicted in 14 sculptures.
- 1988: Wins competition for 6-foot marble sculpture of Cuban Patriot Jose Marti for the San Carlos Institute, Key West, Florida.
- 1989: Beaux Arts Gallery, One Man Show, Miami, Florida.
- 1989: Mielko Gallery, One Man Show, Nantucket.
- 1989: Chicago Invitational Art Fair, Chicago.
- 1990: Art Miami 1990, Miami, Florida.
- 1990: Beaux Arts Gallery, One Man Show, Miami, Florida.
- 1991: Beaux Arts Gallery, One Man Show, Miami, Florida.
- 1991: Excellence Award for the Arts from FACE, Facts About Cuban Exiles.
- 1992: Wins selection for the Brickell Avenue Bridge Artwork, Carbonell moves to Pietrasanta, Italy, to commence two-year project.
- 1995: Brickell Avenue Bridge, completion of 36-foot bronze bas-relief column, 17-foot sculpture of Teguesta Family, four 4-foot by 8-foot bas-reliefs of Miami's pioneers and twelve bas-reliefs of the Florida Fauna.
- 1996: Beaux Arts Gallery, One Man Show, Miami, Florida.
- 1998: One Man Show at One Brickell Square, Miami, Florida.
- 2000: Beaux Arts Gallery, One Man Show, Miami, Florida.
- 2001: Silvana Facchini Gallery, One Man Show, Miami, Florida.
- 2002: Silvana Facchini Gallery, One Man Show, Miami, Florida.
- 2003: Beaux Arts Gallery, One Man Show, Miami, Florida.
- 2003: Remy Toledo Gallery, One Man Show, New York.
- 2004: Beaux Arts Gallery, Permanent Exhibit, Miami, Florida.
- 2005: The Third Invitational Sarasota Season of Sculpture.
- 2005: Beaux Arts Gallery, Permanent Exhibit, Miami, Florida.
- 2006: Beaux Arts Gallery, Permanent Exhibit, Miami, Florida.
- 2007: Dedication to the City of Shanghai of the sculpture "New Generation", Shanghai, China.
- 2007: Ifa Gallery, Shanghai, China.
- 2007: Shanghai Art Fair, Shanghai, China.
- 2007: Beaux Arts Gallery, Permanent Exhibit, Miami, Florida.
- 2007: Miami Art Fair, Miami, Florida.
- 2008: Art Madrid Art Fair, Madrid, Spain.
- 2008: Beaux Arts Gallery, Permanent Exhibit, Miami, Florida.
- 2008: ArteAmericas Art Fair, Miami, Florida.
- 2008: Art Shanghai 2008, Shanghai, China.
- 2008: Beaux Arts Gallery, Permanent Exhibit, Miami, Florida.
- 2008: The Shanghai Art Fair, Shanghai, China,
- 2009: Art Shanghai Art Fair, Shanghai, China.
- 2009: The Shanghai Art Fair, Shanghai, China.
- 2008: Art Miami Art Fair, Miami, Florida.
- 2009: Beaux Arts Gallery, Permanent Exhibit, Miami, Florida.
- 2010: Miami International Art Fair, Miami, Florida.
- 2010: Art Palm Beach, Palm Beach, Florida.
- 2010: ArteAmericas Art Fair, Miami, Florida.
- 2010: Art Shanghai 2010, Shanghai, China.
- 2011: ArteAmericas Art Fair, Miami Florida.
- 2011: Art Naples, Florida.
- 2011: Art Shanghai 2011, Shanghai, China.
- 2011: Beaux Arts Gallery, Permanent Exhibit, Miami, Florida.
- 2012: ArteAmericas Art Fair, Miami, Florida.
- 2012: Feria Iberoamericana de Arte, Caracas, Venezuela, Galeria Medicci.
- 2013: Art Wynwood Art Fair, Miami, Florida, Galeria Medicci.
- 2013: Feria Iberoamericana de Arte, Caracas, Venezuela, Galeria Medicci.
- 2014: Feria Iberoamericana de Arte, Caracas, Venezuela, Galeria Medicci.
- 2014: One Man Show, Galeria Medicci.
- 2014: Concept Sea Fair, Art Basel, Miami, Galeria Medicci.
- 2015: Aspen Art Fair, Kavachnina Contemporary, Miami.
- 2015: Adrian Kavachnina Galerie, Paris, France.
- 2016: Beaux Arts Gallery, Permanent Exhibition, Miami, Florida.
- 2016: Galeria Medicci, Caracas, Venezuela.
- 2016: Adrian Kavachnina Galerie, Paris, France.
- 2017: Beaux Arts Gallery, Permanent Exhibition, Miami, Florida.
- 2017: Galeria Medicci, Caracas, Venezuela.
- 2017: Adrian Kavachnina Galerie, Paris, France.
- 2018: Beaux Arts Gallery, Permanent Exhibition, Miami, Florida.
- 2019: Beaux Arts Gallery, Permanent Exhibition, Miami, Florida.
- 2019: Sultan/Delon Fine Art, Art Palm Beach, Florida.
- 2020: Beaux Arts Gallery, Permanent Exhibition, Miami, Florida.
- 2020: Sultan/Delon Fine Art, Art Palm Beach, Florida.
