= Umberto Peña =

- Born: Umberto Peña; 1937; Havana, Cuba
- Died: June 21, 2023 (aged 85–86); Salamanca, Spain
- Education: Escuela Nacional de Bellas Artes San Alejandro
- Known for: Painting, printmaking, graphic design
- Movement: Cuban modern art

Umberto Peña (1937 – 21 June 2023) was a Cuban painter, printmaker, and graphic designer whose work encompassed painting, engraving, and graphic design. He played an active role in Cuban cultural institutions during the 1960s and later lived and worked abroad, continuing his artistic practice until his death in Spain.

== Early life and education ==
Umberto Peña was born in Havana, Cuba, in 1937. He studied painting at the Escuela Nacional de Bellas Artes San Alejandro in Havana between 1954 and 1958.

In March 1959, he joined the Asociación de Grabadores de Cuba, beginning his professional engagement with printmaking. In 1960, he received a scholarship to study in Mexico, where he pursued mural painting and Byzantine mosaic techniques at the Escuela de Artes Aplicadas La Ciudadela.

== Career ==
Peña began exhibiting his work publicly in 1959 in Cuba and Mexico. In 1960, he held a solo exhibition at the Centro de Arte Mexicano Contemporáneo in Mexico City and produced the mural woodcut Las dictaduras en América.

After returning to Cuba, Peña worked as a graphic designer for the Department of Propaganda of the Government of Havana and later served as art director of Casa de las Américas, where he was responsible for the graphic design of books, magazines, and institutional publications. His work during this period contributed to the development of Cuban graphic design.

Throughout the 1960s, Peña participated in collective exhibitions in Cuba and abroad and received awards for his graphic and printmaking work. His artistic practice included painting, engraving, textile design, and stage design.

Later critical assessments have emphasized the expressive intensity and experimental character of Peña’s work, highlighting his interest in the relationship between visual intelligence, artistic creation, and contemporary cultural questions.

== Later years ==
In later decades, Peña lived outside Cuba, including extended periods in the United States and Spain. In 2012, he presented a solo exhibition in Salamanca titled Acerca de Salamanca: Pinturas y dibujos recientes, marking a renewed public presentation of his personal artistic work.

His work has been represented by galleries specializing in Cuban and Latin American art, including Cernuda Arte, which documents his career and body of work.

Umberto Peña died on 21 June 2023 in Salamanca, Spain, at the age of 85, following an illness.

Peña is regarded as an important figure in Cuban visual culture for his contributions to painting, printmaking, and graphic design, particularly during the cultural transformations of the 1960s. His work continues to be discussed in contemporary critical and curatorial contexts.
