= José Bedia Valdés =

Cuban painter (born 1959)

- José Braulio Bedia Valdés
- Born: José Braulio Bedia Valdés; January 13, 1959 (age 67); Havana, Cuba
- Education: Escuela Nacional de Bellas Artes "San Alejandro"; Instituto Superior de Arte
- Known for: Painting
- Notable work: Señor de la Noche (1992)
- Movement: Grupo Volumen I
- Awards: Guggenheim Fellowship (1993)

José Braulio Bedia Valdés (born January 13, 1959) is a Cuban painter currently residing in Florida.

== Biography ==
Señor de la Noche, acrylic on canvas by José Bedia Valdés, 1992, Honolulu Museum of Art

Bedia was born on born January 13, 1959 in Havana, Cuba. He studied at the Escuela Nacional de Bellas Artes "San Alejandro" and then finished his art studies at the Instituto Superior de Arte in Havana. He escaped Cuba in 1990, settling initially in Mexico and subsequently, in 1993, in the United States.

== Individual exhibitions (selection) ==
- 1989 – Final del Centauro – Castillo de la Real Fuerza, Havana, Cuba.
- 1992 – "Jose Bedia: De Donde Vengo (Where I Come From)" – Museum of Contemporary Art, San Diego, California.
- 1994 – José Bedia: De Donde Vengo – Institute of Contemporary Art, University of Pennsylvania.
- 2004 – Estremecimientos – Museo Extremeño e Iberoamericano de Arte Contemporaneo (MEIAC), Badajoz, Spain.
- September 18, 2011 – January 8, 2012 – Transcultural Pilgrim: Three Decades of Work by José Bedia – Fowler Museum, UCLA.

== Collective exhibitions (selection) ==
In 1978 he began participating with other artists in several collective exhibitions. In 1980 he conformed the exhibition XIX Premi Internacional de Dibuix Joan Miró. Fundació Joan Miró, Centre d'Estudis d'Art Contemporani, Parc de Montjuic, Barcelona, Spain; Los novísimos cubanos. Grupo Volumen I was a significant exhibition that took place at The Signs Gallery, New York.

He was selected to participate in the Cubans exhibition in the 1st and 2nd Havana Biennial Bienal de La Habana, Museo Nacional de Bellas Artes. In 1990 he was in the XLIV Exposizione Internazionale d’Arte, Biennale di Venezia, Venice, Italy. In 1994, his work was exhibited at "InSite94: A Binational Exhibition of Installation and Site Specific Art" San Diego Train Station, San Diego, California.

In 2001 his work was part of Inside and Out, Contemporary Sculpture, Video and Installations, Bass Museum of Art, IV Bienal del Caribe y Centroamérica, Museo de Arte Moderno, Santo Domingo, Dominican Republic. In 2013 Bedia participated in the collective exhibit Drapetomania: Exposicion Homenaje a Grupo Antillano in Santiago de Cuba.

In 2019, José Bedia's work was included in the group show The Gift of Art, at Pérez Art Museum Miami. The exhibition highlighted important artworks within PAMM's permanent collection on Latinx and Latin American artists. Among the artists featured in the exhibition were Carmen Herrera (Cuba), Teresa Margolles (Mexico), Roberto Matta (Chile), Oscar Murillo (Colombia), Amelia Peláez (Cuba), Zilia Sánchez (Cuba), Tunga (Brazil) and Wifredo Lam (Cuba).

The Pérez Art Museum Miami, Florida, organized the group show This is America: Selections from PAMM's Collection in 2026, which featured Jose Bedia's work. The show interrogates the term 'American art' and draws on artists interpretation of what it means to be an American.

== Awards ==
He has obtained several awards for his artistic work:

- 1982 – First Prize in the "Salón Paisaje ’82", Museo Nacional de Bellas Artes de La Habana, Havana, Cuba.
- 1993 – International Guggenheim Fellowship, New York City.
- 1988 – Distinction for the National Culture, Cuban Council of State, Havana, Cuba.

== Public collections (selection) ==
His pieces can be found in the permanent collections of:

- George Adams Gallery, New York City
- Arkansas Art Center, Little Rock, Arkansas
- Birmingham Museum of Art, Birmingham, Alabama
- Cantor Arts Center, Stanford University, California
- Galería Nina Menocal in Mexico
- Honolulu Museum of Art, Honolulu, Hawaii
- Loeb Art Center, Vassar College, Poughkeepsie, New York
- Ludwig Forum für Internationale Kunst, Aachen, Germany
- Pérez Art Museum Miami, Florida
- Porin Taidemuseo, Finland
- Centro Wifredo Lam, Havana
- Museo Nacional de Bellas Artes de La Habana, Havana
- NSU Art Museum, Fort Lauderdale, Florida
- de la Cruz Collection, Florida
- Kendall Art Center, Miami, Florida
- Frost Art Museum, Miami, Florida
- The von Christierson Collection, United Kingdom
- Farber Collection, Florida

== Bibliography ==
- Jose Bedia Works 1978-2006, Turner, 2007.
- Jose Bedia: Transcultural Pilgrim, Bettelheim and Berlo, 2012.
- José Bedia: Estremecimientos, Omar-Pascual Castillo, 2004.
- Jose Viegas; Memoria: Artes Visuales Cubanas Del Siglo Xx; (California International Arts 2004); ISBN 978-0-917571-12-1.
