= Pablo Borges Delgado =

Cuban artist (born 1955)

Pablo Amancio Borges Delgado
- Born: February 10, 1955 (age 71); Baracoa, Cuba

Pablo Amancio Borges Delgado (born February 10, 1955) is a Cuban artist.

Borges, from 1968 to 1970, studied at the Escuela Nacional de Bellas Artes "San Alejandro" and studied at the Instituto Superior de Arte (ISA) in Havana. In 1980 he became a member of the artistic group "Versiones del Paisaje", in Havana.

== Individual exhibitions ==
- 1986 – Exposición de Grabado de Pequeño Formato, Museo de los Capitanes Generales, Havana.
- 1988 – Exposición de 20 Grabados, Tokyo Metropolitan Art Museum, Tokyo, Japan.
- 1993 – "Uno más uno", Encuentro de Grabado’93, Galería Galiano, Havana.
- 1997 – Percepción del Misterio, Galería La Casona, Fondo Cubano de Bienes Culturales, Havana.

== Collective exhibitions ==
- 1979 – 1st Trienal de Grabados Víctor Manuel, Galería de La Habana, Cuba.
- 1981 – 1er Salón Nacional de Pequeño Formato; Salón Lalo Carrasco, Hotel Habana Libre, Havana, Cuba.
- 1981 – International Print Biennale, Varna, Bulgaria.
- 1983–1984 – "7 Artistas Cubanos Contemporáneos", Museo Español de Arte Contemporáneo, Madrid, Spain.
- 1983 – 15th International Biennial of Graphic Art, Moderna Galerija, Ljubljana, Slovenia.
- 1987 – International Print Biennale Varna 87, Varna, Bulgaria.

== Awards ==
- 1976 – Engraving Mention VI Salón Nacional Juvenil, Museo Nacional de Bellas Artes de La Habana, Havana, Cuba.
- 1990 – Prize of Acquisition, 6th International Biennial Exhibition of Portrait, Drawings and Graphic Tuzla 90; The Yugoslav Portrait Gallery, Tuzla, Bosnia and Herzegovina.
- 1990 – First Prize, Salón de Artes Plásticas UNEAC’90, Museo Nacional de Bellas Artes de La Habana, Havana, Cuba.
- 1995 – Premio [Ex-aequo] Pilar Juncosa, Talleres Miro, Fundación Pilar y Joan Miró, Mallorca, Spain.
- 1995 – Honorable Mention, Primera Bienal de Grabado Latinoamericana y del Caribe, Facultad de Bellas Artes, Universidad del Atlántico, Barranquilla, Colombia.
- 1998 – First Prize, Trienal Internacional of Mini-Print, Tokyo, Japan.
- 1999 – Distinción por la Cultura Nacional, Cuban Ministry of Culture.

== Collections ==
Borges' works can be found in the permanent collections of:

- Casa de las Américas (Havana), in Havana, Cuba.
- Museo de la Gráfica de Pequeño Formato, Łódź, Poland.
- Museo Nacional de Bellas Artes de La Habana, Havana, Cuba.
- Yugoslav Portrait Gallery, Tuzla, Bosnia and Herzegovina.
- Museo de Arte Moderno de Antioquia, Medellín, Colombia.
- Franco Galeria, Bogotá, Colombia.
- Fundación Pilar y Joan Miró, Mallorca, Spain.
- Tama University Museum, Tokyo, Japan.
