= Rita Longa =

Cuban sculptor

Rita Longa Aróstegui
- Born: June 14, 1912; Havana, Cuba
- Died: May 29, 2000 (aged 87); Havana, Cuba
- Occupation: Sculptor
- Notable work: Shape, Space and Light (1953)

Rita Longa Aróstegui (June 14, 1912, Havana, Cuba — May 29, 2000, Havana, Cuba) was a Cuban sculptor.

She first studied commercial art and later briefly attended the San Alejandro Academy of Fine Arts but considered herself largely self-taught. She worked in bronze, marble and tile.

"Rhythm, movement, grace, refinement and elegance are some of the qualities that define the organic quality of the pieces created by this artist."

Influenced by Art Deco, Longa created works that have become symbols of the environment to which they belong. Her Los Venados (1947), depicting a family of deer, stands at the entrance to the Havana Zoo. The marble Ballerina (1950) presides over the entrance of the internationally known Tropicana Cabaret Club. A bronze sculpture of the Indian chief Hatuey (1953) became the symbol of Hatuey beer found all over Cuba.

Perhaps Longa's best known work is her modernist sculpture Shape, Space and Light (1953), positioned at the main entrance of the National Museum of Fine Arts in Havana.

== Las Tunas “City of Sculpture” ==
On the initiative of Rita Longa, the city, Las Tunas, in southeast Cuba, which she considered her second home, erected more than 125 public works of art. Her bronze statue of Jose Marti, the Apostle of Cuban Independence, situated in the plaza bearing his name, doubles as a solar clock.

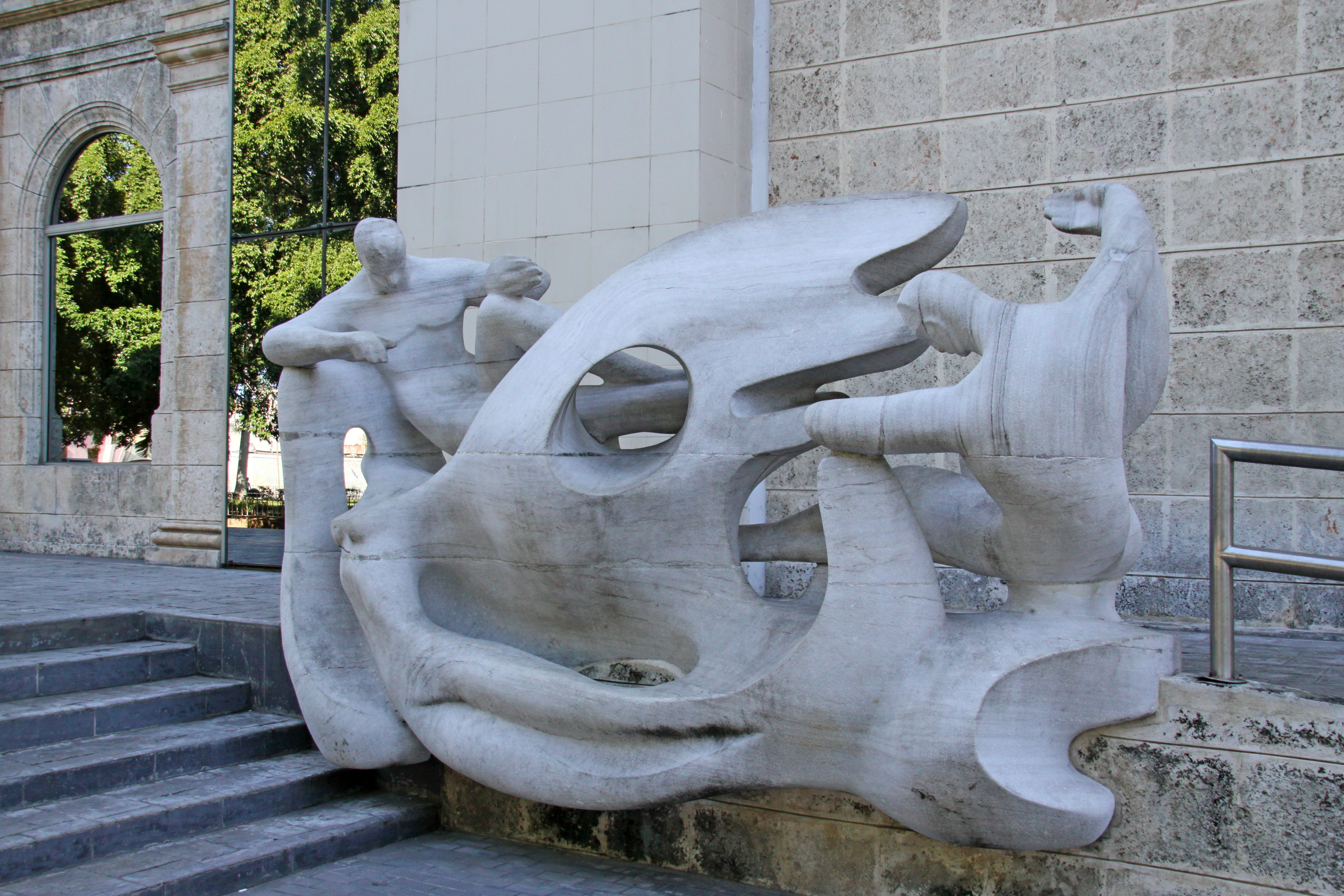
Form Space and Light. Marble sculpture by Rita Longa 1953, outside the Museum of Art (New Building) in Havana/Cuba

She also has works all over Havana—at the National Zoo (“Family Group”), the Colón Cemetery, the Museum of Fine Arts (Shape, Space and Light), the Surgical Medical Center, the Payret Theater ("The Muses" and "Illusion"), Habana Libre Hotel (Clepsydra), and the garden of National Theater ("Death of the Swan"). Other countries also hold some of her works like Madrid, Spain (an engraving of Jose Marti) and Belgrade, Serbia (Gema)

== Taino Indian village ==
The sculptor often visited the Zapata Peninsula home of the Taino, Cuba's indigenous people. Fascinated by their culture, she created 25 life-size sculptures from marble dust and concrete depicting their daily life. The works are now scattered about a reconstructed Taino village in Guama that she designed with architect Mario Girona. One of these sculptures of indigenous leader Hatuey has become iconic and symbolic of a beer brand of the same name

== Awards and recent exhibits ==
- 1935: First Prize National Salon of Painting and Sculpture from College of Architects.
- 1936: Gold Medal at XIX Salon of Fine Arts, Havana.
- 1945: First Prize at the Conquest Monument to the Soldier of Independent Wars.
- 1949: First Prize Pan-American Congress of Architects.
- 1951: Gold Medal at Exhibition of the Architectural League in New York City.
- 1982: Alejo Carpentier Medal
- 1988: Félix Varela Medal, Cuba’s highest honor for cultural merit.
- 1995: National Prize of Fine Arts, shared with Agustin Cardenas.
- 1996: Felix Varela Order
- 2012: Exhibit at the Museo Nacional de Bellas Artes, Havana (National Museum of Fine Art) featuring 29 of her works on the 100th anniversary of her birth.

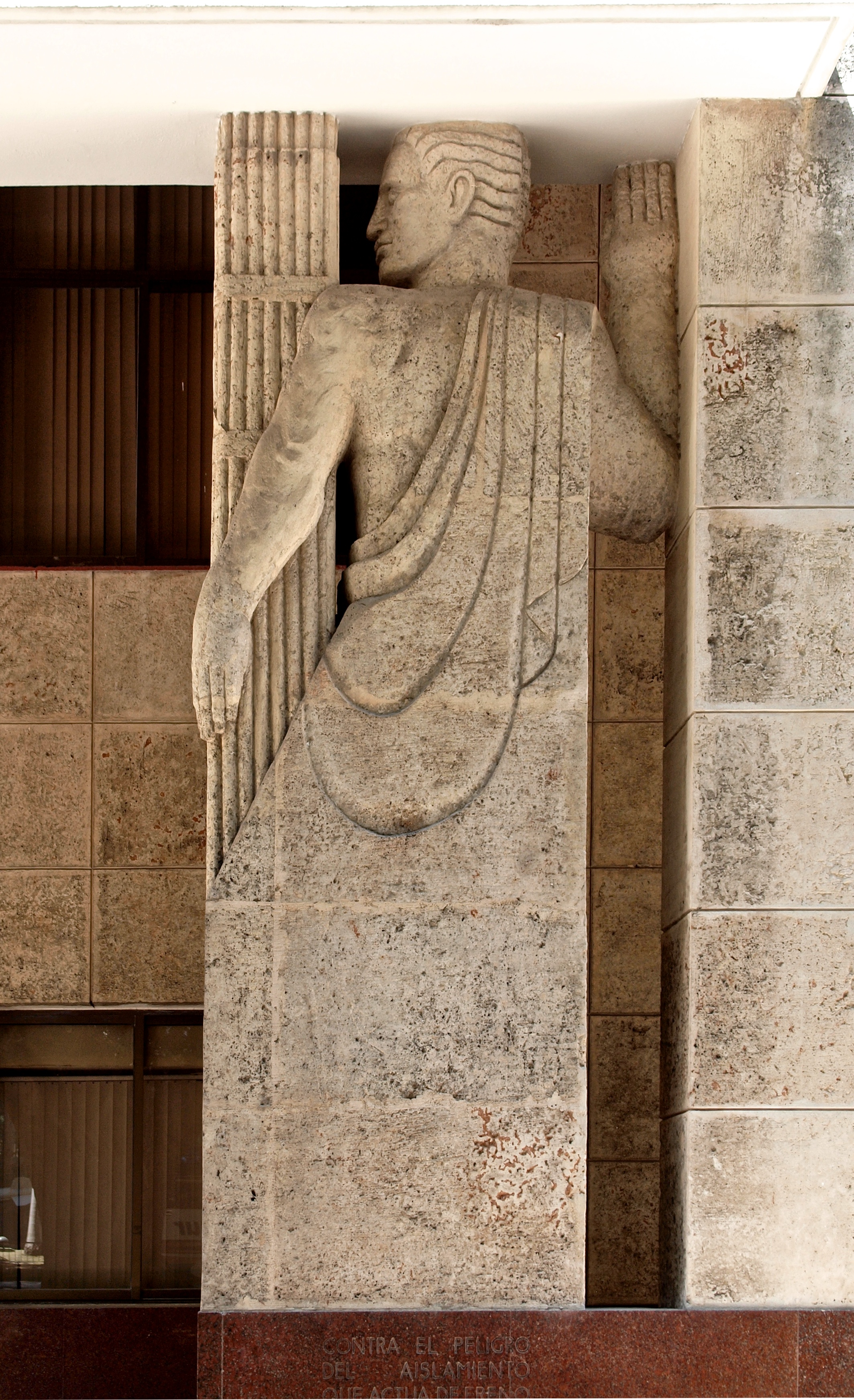

== Sources ==
1. Fortune, Jane and Falcone, Linda, 2014. When the World Answered: Florence, Women and the 1966 Flood. Florence: The Florentine Press.
2. www.cuba24horas.com/en/cuban-culture/arts/plastic-arts/797-rita-en-el-espacio-y-la-memoria
3. www.galeriacubarte.cult
4. www.soycubano.com/pena
5. Fernandez Salazar, Jose Fernando, 2014. www.thecubanhandshake.org/rita-longas-symbolic-sculpture-undergoing-restoration-in-las-tunas/
