= Academia Nacional de Bellas Artes San Alejandro =

Cuban fine arts school

Coordinates: 23°05′15″N 82°25′37″W

- 31st Avenue and 100th Street, Marianao, Havana, Cuba

Information
- Other names: Escuela Nacional de Bellas Artes "San Alejandro", San Alejandro Academy of Fine Arts, Academia San Alejandro, Escuela Nacional de Bellas Artes San Alejandro, San Alejandro National School of Fine Arts
- Former name: Escuela Profesional de Pintura y Escultura de La Habana
- Established: December 1, 1818
- Founder: Alejandro Ramírez

Academia Nacional de Bellas Artes San Alejandro, is the oldest and most prestigious fine arts school in Cuba. It is also known as Escuela Nacional de Bellas Artes "San Alejandro", Academia San Alejandro, or San Alejandro Academy. The school is located in Marianao, a suburb of Havana, and was founded in 1818 at the Convent of San Alejandro.

It is located today in a monumental building built in the early 1940s.

== Beginning ==
The school was founded with the support of the Economic Society of Friends of the Country and the General Intendant of the Treasury and was founded under the direction of the French artist Jean Baptiste Vermay (1784–1833). The school was named after Don Alejandro Ramírez, general superintendent and director of the Royal Economic Society of Friends of the Country.

It is the educational center with the largest number of years building the teaching on the lands of Latin America, preceded only by the University of Havana. It turned-from a number of changes that occurred in Spain in the 19th century and not surprisingly was felt in the colonies, in the climate of the Constitution of Cádiz of 1812 and enlightened absolutism. It was established by the Royal Patriotic Society and the Royal Consulate of Havana, as the Free School of Drawing and Painting. Its first director, Juan Bautista Vermay, who arrived in Cuba when the Bonaparte empire collapsed, when he was 31 years old.

== Administration ==
The internal life at San Alejandro is governed by the Board of Directors who in turn appoints the Technical Council, who in turn run the different departments that make up the teaching faculty.

The Board of Directors consists of the Director and Deputy Director and the Secretaries Speciality Teaching, Education, Health Care-Economic, Business and Education.

The Technical Board, in turn, is the body responsible for representing the teaching faculty to the Board of Directors. It consists of all deans of each departments. These are the Deans of Drawing, Painting, Engraving, Sculpture, Ceramics, Jewelry, Graphic Arts and Theoretical-Cultural Teachings.

San Alejandro has exchanges with many schools abroad, including in the UK The Cardinal Wiseman Catholic School. Over the past three years, three exchanges have taken place. The exchanges consisted of the students from Wiseman travelling to Cuba in February, and the Cuban students coming to London in June.

== Directors ==
- Jean Baptiste Vermay, from 1818 to 1833
- Francisco Camilo Cuyás Sierra, from 1833 to 1836
- Francisco Guillermo Colson, from 1836 to 1843
- Joseph Leclerc de Baumé, from 1843 to 1852
- Pedro-Federico Mialhe Toussaint, from 1852 to 1858
- Hércules Morelli, from 1858 to 1859
- Augusto Ferrán, from 1859 to 1880
- Juan Francisco Cisneros Guerrero, from 1859 to 1878
- Miguel Melero Rodríguez, from 1878 to 1907
- Luis Mendoza Sandrino, from 1907 to 1926
- Juan Emilio Hernandez Giro, from 1926 to 1927
- Armando García Menocal, from 1927 to 1934
- Leopoldo Romañach Guillén, from 1934 to 1936
- Manuel Vega López, from 1936 to 1939
- Esteban Valderrama Peña, from 1939 to 1942
- Enrique García Cabrera, from 1942 to 1946
- Domingo Ramos Enríquez, from 1946 to 1947
- Mariano Miguel González, from 1947 to 1949
- Esteban Valderrama Peña, from 1949 to 1950
- Leopoldo Romañach Guillén, in 1950
- Esteban Valderrama Peña, from 1950 to 1953
- Enrique Caravia Montenegro, in 1953
- Esteban Valderrama Peña, from 1953 to 1959
- Carmelo González Iglesias, in 1959
- Florencio Gelabert Pérez, from 1959 to 1962
- Fausto Ramos Valdés, from 1962 to 1963
- Josefina González Grande, from 1963 to 1967
- Luis Fuentes Quesada, in 1967
- José de Lázaro (Delarra) Bencomo, from 1967 to 1968
- Mercedes Soto, from 1968 to 1969
- Ahmed Safille, from 1969 to 1972
- Roberto Martíínez, from 1972 to 1973
- Armando Prieto, from 1973 to 1974
- Jorge Samper, from 1974 to 1975
- Juan Sánchez Sánchez, from 1975 to 1978
- Celia Morán, from 1978 to 1981
- Jorge Rodríguez, from 1981 to 1990
- Jorge Ferrero de Armas, from 1990 to 1993
- Miguel Fagundo Batista, from 1993 to 1999
- Sandra Fuentes Guevara, from 2000 to present

== Notable alumni ==
- Nela Arias-Misson (1915–2015), painter and sculptor
- Belkis Ayón (1967–1999), printmaker
- José Bedia Valdés (born 1959), painter
- Tania Bruguera (born 1968), artist and activist
- Manuel Carbonell (1918–2011), sculptor
- Agustín Cárdenas (1927–2001), sculptor
- Pablo Borges Delgado (born 1955), artist
- Juan Roberto Diago Durruthy (born 1971), painter
- Antonia Eiriz (1929–1995), painter
- Eberto Escobedo Lazo (1919–1995), painter
- Agustín Fernández (1928–2006), painter, sculptor, and multimedia artist
- Flora Fong (born 1949), painter, and educator
- Antonio Gattorno (1904–1980), painter
- Enrique Gay García (1928–2015), painter and sculptor
- Juan Esnard Heydrich (1917–1998), sculptor
- Fayad Jamís (1930–1988), Mexican-Cuban poet, painter, designer, journalist, and translator
- Wifredo Lam (1902–1982), painter, printmaker, and sculptor
- Alicia Leal (born 1957), painter
- Reynier Leyva Novo (born 1983), conceptual artist
- Rita Longa (1912–2000), sculptor
- Jilma Madera (1915–2000), sculptor
- Víctor Manuel (1897–1969), painter
- José Martí (1853–1895), poet, philosopher, essayist, journalist, translator and revolutionary
- Elvira Martínez de Melero (1858–1925), painter and one of the school's first female graduates
- Manuel Mendive (born 1944), multidisciplinary artist
- Amelia Peláez (1896–1968), painter
- Roberto Juan Diago Querol (1920–1955), photographer, engraver and painter
- Sandra Ramos (born 1969), painter, printmaker, collagist, video and installation artist
- Teodoro Ramos Blanco (1902–1972), sculptor, and educator
- Osvaldo Salas (1914–1992), photographer
- Mariano Suárez del Villar (1929–1996), painter and composer
- Manuel Rodulfo Tardo (1913–1998), sculpture
- José Toirac (born 1966), painter and installation artist
- Fernando Velázquez Vigil (1950–2002), ceramist and painter
- Camilo Venegas (born 1967), journalist and writer

== Notable faculty ==
- Juan José Sicre (1898–1974), sculptor
