= Camilo Venegas =

Cuban writer and journalist

Camilo Venegas Yero (born 16 July 1967, Paradero de Camarones, Cuba) is a Cuban writer and journalist. Since 2000, he has lived in Santo Domingo, Dominican Republic.

== Biography ==
Camilo Venegas Yero
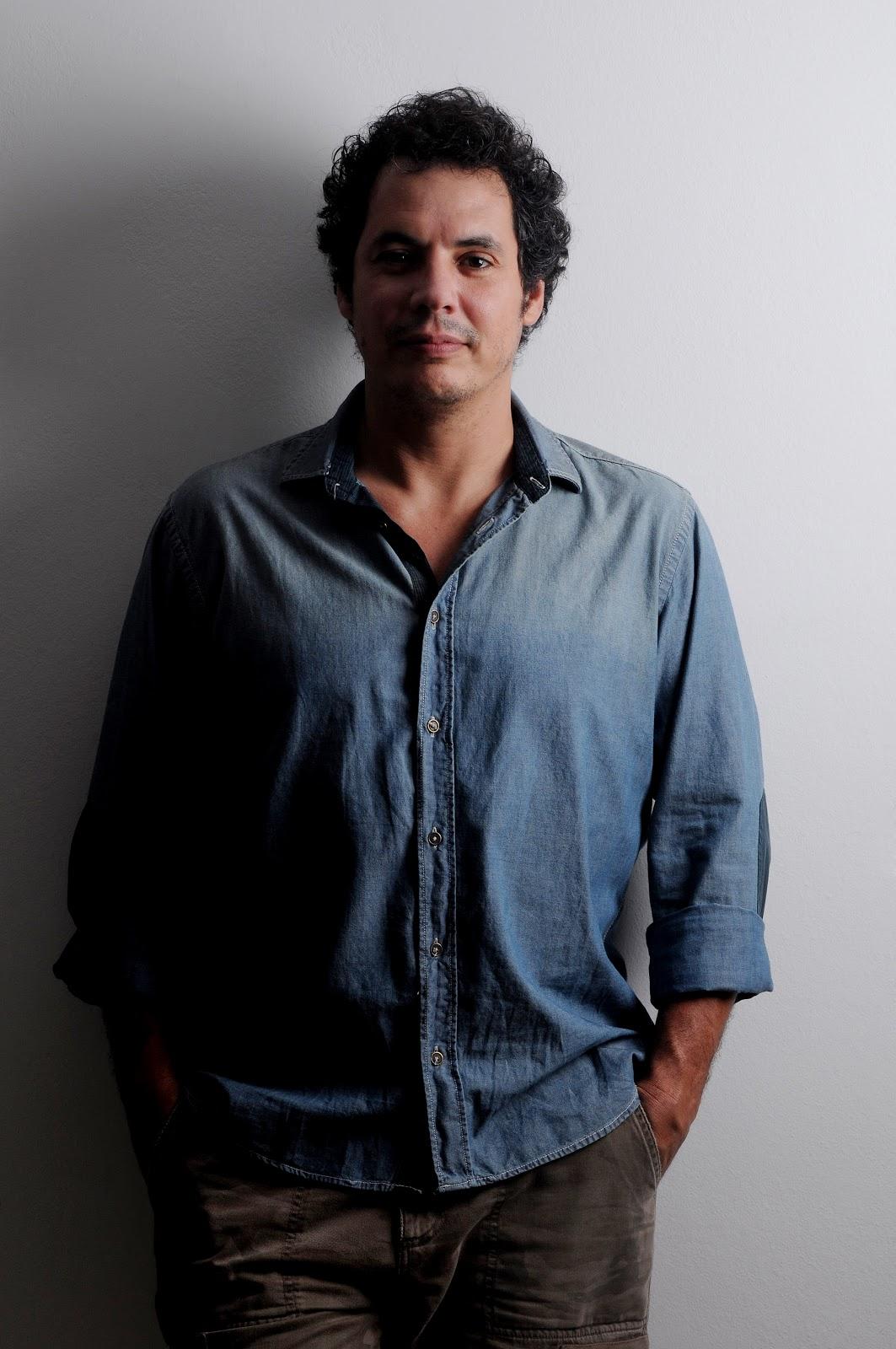
- Born: July 16, 1967 (age 58) Paradero de Camarones, Cuba
- Occupation: Writer and journalist
- Language: Castilian
- Genres: Fiction, poetry, journalism

Camilo Venegas was born in Paradero de Camarones, in central Cuba, and spent his childhood living with his maternal grandparents in the town train station. He graduated from the Escuela Nacional de Arte de La Habana with a degree in theatrical direction. In 1987 he founded Teatro Acuestas, a collective that also included Eloy Ganuza, Ricardo Muñoz Caravaca, Mérida Urquía and Vladimir Cruz. During these years, he also collaborated in various projects of Ediciones Vigía and its founder, Alfredo Vigía.

After this, he worked at the magazines El Caimán Barbudo and La Gaceta de Cuba, along with Bladimir Zamora, Norberto Codina, Arturo Arango and Omar Valiño. At the time he left Cuba, he had been working as the director of the Fondo Editorial Casa de las Américas.

In the Dominican Republic, Venegas was editor of the periodicals El Caribe and Diario Libre, as well as working in the Centro Cultural Eduardo León Jiménes and at Newlink Communications, an international public relations consultancy. He is a founding partner of Ediciones El Fogonero, a firm that consults in communication strategies and produces content.

== Awards and honors ==
In Cuba, Venegas 'won' the Premio Nacional de Periodismo Cultural (National Prize for Cultural Journalism) in 1998 for his interview "Silvio Rodríguez, anxiety is the price of being yourself." In 2002, one of his reports published in El Caribe, "Tina Modotti never existed," won the Award of Excellence from the Society for News Design of the United States. In 2003, he was awarded the Premio Internacional de Cuento (International Short Story Award) from Casa de Teatro for his work "Irlanda está después del puente" ("Ireland after the bridge").

In 2015, Venegas was awarded the Premio Caonabo de Oro, the most well-known award granted by the Dominican Association of Journalists and Writers, for "his contributions to Dominican journalism and the great career he has had in the Dominican Republic as a writer and consultant".

Venegas' writings have appeared in reviews and publications in Cuba, Mexico, the Dominican Republic, Canada, the United States, Spain, Argentina and Germany, among others.

His blog, El Fogonero, created in 2006, is one of the most well-known blog addressing Cuban affairs.

== Works ==
- Las canciones se olvidan. Mexico, 1992.
- De transparencia en transparencia (Anthology of poems). Cuba, 1993.
- Los trenes no vuelven. Cuba, 1994.
- Poesía Cubana: La Isla Entera. Spain, 1995.
- Dossier: 26 Nuevos Poetas Cubanos. Mapa Imaginario. Cuba, 1995.
- Cine Vedado. Cuba, 1996.
- Nuevos juegos prohibidos. Cuba, 1997.
- Itinerario. Dominican Republic, 2003.
- Irlanda está después del puente. Dominican Republic, 2004.
- Afuera. Spain, 2007.
- ¿Por qué decimos adiós cuando pasan los trenes?. Dominican Republic, 2011.
