= Reynier Leyva Novo =

Cuban multimedia artist (born 1983)

- Born: 1983 (age 42–43); Havana, Cuba
- Education: Academia Nacional de Bellas Artes San Alejandro; Instituto Superior de Arte
- Known for: Painting, Performance, Installation
- Notable work: El peso de la Historia, 2014 (9 Laws from the series The Weight of History); Patria, muerte y azúcar, 2019 (Homeland, death and sugar)
- Movement: Contemporary art; conceptual art

Reynier Leyva Novo (born 1983 in Havana, Cuba) is a multidisciplinary contemporary and conceptual artist working across the Americas. His artistic practice often includes the use of data from official records and the reimagining of historical narratives localizing Cuban history within the global geopolitical discourse. Leyva Novo relocated to Houston, Texas, in 2021.

== Early life and education ==
Reynier Leyva Novo was born in Havana, Cuba, in 1983. He attended the San Alejandro Academy of Fine Arts (2004), and later the department of Art Practice at the Instituto Superior de Arte (2007), at the time directed by artist, activist and educator Tania Bruguera.

== Career ==
Leyva Novo's conceptual work confronts historical systems of power and addresses the impact of migration and climate crisis in a global context. He uses photography, video, installations, and media arts in his works. He is a member of the activist collective 27N.

In 2016, he was an artist-in-residence at Residency Unlimited, New York. In the following year, Leyva Novo's work 9 Leyes from the series El peso de la Historia [9 Laws from the series The Weight of History] (2014) was included in the survey exhibition On the Horizon: Contemporary Cuban Art from the Jorge M. Pérez Collection at the Pérez Art Museum Miami, presenting a selection of artworks loaned and acquired by the museum. Also in 2017, he was included in the Pacific Standard Time: LA/LA, Los Angeles. His works Arqueologia de una sonrisa [Archaeology of a Smile] (2015-2017) and El beso de cristal [Crystal Kiss] (2015) were on display in the art triennial Frestas, in Sao Paulo, Brazil, in 2017.

Leyva Novo presented Patria, muerte y azúcar / Homeland, death and sugar at his house during the 13th Havana Biennial in 2019, the work is about his investigation on transatlantic slave trade and colonial enterprises in the Caribbean region.

Reynier Leyva Novo: Methuselah (2021–2022), a digital artwork depicting a Monarch butterfly through the insect's yearly journey for reproduction from Mexico, the United States, and into southern Canada. The work was developed in collaboration with taxidermists, software engineers, and technologists, who helped to create a media artwork modeled after the Monarch's actual migration pattern and experience during its annual reproduction cycle, considering weather changes and other natural phenomena. The work was commissioned by and exhibited at the El Museo del Barrio, New York, with support from Via Art Fund and various art institutions including the Pérez Art Museum Miami, Columbia University, and Arizona State University Art Museum.

In 2023, Leyva Novo presented the solo show Sunset Road at Artpace, San Antonio, as a culmination of his artist-in-residence at the Texas arts organization. The installation Sauna Truck commented on the 2022 tragic incident involving a truck with dozens of migrants who were abandoned in a San Antonio road. Reynier Leyva Novo: The Flowers of My Exile (2023) was an autobiographical solo exhibition presented at an arts space in Phoenix, Arizona. The photography compilation showcased native species of flora encountered by Leyva Novo in his travels since leaving Cuba in exile in 2021.

The Blaffer Art Museum at the University of Houston, presented the solo show Reynier Leyva Novo: Former Present Today (2024), exhibiting a new body of work on public monuments and the commemoration of tyrannical and authoritarian figures in global history. In the same year, a public monument by Leyva Novo following the same investigation was on view at Post, an arts organization in Texas.

== Collections ==
Leyva Novo's work is featured in museum collections in the United States and abroad, including the Pérez Art Museum Miami, Florida; Kadist, California; Walker Art Center, Minnesota; Hirshhorn Museum and Sculpture Garden, Washington D.C.; Museum of Fine Arts, Houston, Texas; and the Columbus Museum of Art, Ohio; among others.
