= Elvira Martínez de Melero =

Cuban painter

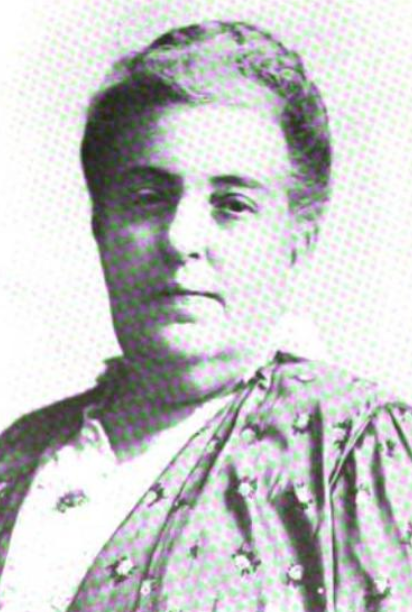
- Born: 1858; Havana, Cuba
- Died: September 14, 1925 (aged 66–67)
- Education: Academia Nacional de Bellas Artes San Alejandro; Art Students League of New York
- Occupation: painter

Elvira Martínez de Melero (1858 – September 14, 1925) was a Cuban painter and feminist activist.

== Early life and education ==
Elvira Martínez was born in Havana, Cuba, in 1858. At a young age, she developed ambitions for a career in the arts. In 1883, she joined the first group of women to attend the prestigious Academia Nacional de Bellas Artes San Alejandro.

Martínez married Miguel Ángel Melero, whose father, Miguel Melero Rodríguez, ran the San Alejandro academy and had overseen its initial admission of women, in July 1885. The couple traveled to Paris, where Martínez had won a government grant to study, exposing her to inspiring new artistic techniques. However, her husband died suddenly just two years into their marriage, while they were still in France, throwing her future into question.

After being widowed, Martínez focused on pursuing art. She traveled to study at the Art Students League of New York, where she was impressed by the school's efforts at gender equality. Then, in 1888, she returned to Cuba, where she resumed studying at San Alejandro until 1892.

== Artistic career ==
As a painter, Martínez was known for her still lives and depictions of natural landscapes, often featuring tropical fruits and coastal scenes in Havana. In addition to her education in Europe and New York, her interest in East Asian and South Asian art significantly influenced her work, leading her to incorporate vivid colors and flat planes of perspective.

Her artistic production gained increasing recognition, despite some critics dismissing her as a hobbyist in the shadow of her late husband. Beyond various exhibitions in Cuban salons, in 1893, four of her paintings were displayed at the World's Columbian Exposition in Chicago, as the only Cuban artist at the fair. Her work also appeared at the Louisiana Purchase Exposition in 1904.

Beginning in 1892, she also worked as an art teacher. In time, she was appointed inspector of drawing and modeling of public schools by the Cuban government, which gave her significant influence in her field at a time when women rarely held government positions. In 1916, she published an influential work on the study of art in Cuba, Art as an Exponent of the Culture of a People. She was an active member of the Cuban Academia Nacional de Artes y Letras.

== Activism ==
In addition to her artistic work, Martínez was a passionate feminist activist. In 1923, she was involved in the Cuban National Federation of Women's First National Congress, the first event of its kind in Latin America, where early Cuban feminists called for women's suffrage and other rights.

== Death and legacy ==
Elvira Martínez de Melero died in 1925. Her work has continued to be exhibited in the century after her death, with her 1912 piece Marañones appearing as part of the 2016 show "Ardid para engañar al tiempo" at the Museo Nacional de Bellas Artes de La Habana.
