= Eberto Escobedo Lazo =

Cuban artist (1919–1995)

Eberto Escobedo Lazo (29 November 1919 – 1995) was a Cuban artist known for landscape paintings. He was born in Camagüey, Cuba. He studied at Escuela Nacional de Bellas Artes “San Alejandro”, Havana, Cuba.

== Individual exhibitions ==
In 1946 he exhibited "50 óleos de Escobedo" in the Sociedad Universitaria de Bellas Artes, at the Universidad de La Habana in Havana, his first personal exhibition. In 1968 he presented "Escobedo y Delarra" at the Galería Isla de Pinos in Isla de Pinos, and in 1969 his paintings were shown under the name of “Puentes” at the Galería de La Habana in Havana, Cuba.

== Collective exhibitions ==
His art was shown in 1939 at the XXI Salón de Bellas Artes, Círculo de Bellas Artes in Havana. In 1951 he was part of "Art Cubain Contemporain" at the Musée National D’Art Moderne in Paris, France. In Cuba he exhibited his pieces in 1970 in am exhibition displayed at the Museo Nacional de Bellas Artes in a show called "Salón, 70". In 1994 he was selected for "Cuban Art The Last Sixty Years" at the Panamerican Art Gallery in Dallas, Texas, United States.

== Awards ==
He obtained recognition for his artistic work in 1939 when he received the Mention of Honor at the XXI Salón de Bellas Artes, Círculo de Bellas Artes in Havana and the 1955 Golden Medal at the show Cuba en Tampa: La Feria del Progreso in Tampa, Florida, United States.

== Collections ==
His works are in collections such as the Museo Nacional de Bellas Artes de La Habana, Cuba, as well as the Ignacio Agramonte's Museum in Camagüey, Cuba and the Tampa Museum of Art, Tampa, Florida.
