= Alicia Leal =

Cuban painter (born 1957)

Alicia Leal Veloz (born 15 November 1957) is a Cuban painter. She was born in Sancti Spíritus.

== Art ==
Leal's work focuses on women and the relationship between women and men, and they are known for their flat perspective with intricate and narrative details. Her paintings take inspiration from folk art. Leal works from the studio she owns with her husband and fellow painter Juan Moreira. Their studio is located in El Vedado in Havana, Cuba. Her work is a part of permanent collections at world-class institutions such as the National Museum of Fine Art in Havana and the Spanish Embassy at the United Nations Headquarters in New York City.

Leal is a 1980 graduate of the San Alejandro Fine Arts School, known as the first art school in Cuba. She is also a member of the National Union of Writers and Artists of Cuba (UNEAC) and the International Association of Art (IAA/AIAP).

== Exhibitions ==
Leal has participated in nearly one-hundred collective exhibitions, including:

- 1984—Alicia Leal, drawings and paintings. Homage to José Fowler. Culture House of Plaza municipality, Havana, Cuba.
- 1985—When I See a Tree. 23 y 12 Art Center, Havana, Cuba.
- 1986—Alicia Leal. Ernest Thaelman Art Gallery, Berlin, Germany.
- 1987—Alicia Leal Exhibit. Habana Libre Hotel, Havana, Cuba.
- 1988—Alicia Leal. Robinson Gallery, Houston, Texas, US.
- 1992—Tales While Walking. Espacio Abierto Art Gallery, Revolución y Cultura Magazine, Havana, Cuba.
- 1994—Juan Moreira and Alicia Leal. Chelsea Art Gallery, Kingston, Jamaica.
- 1997—Juan Moreira and Alicia Leal. La Acacia Art Gallery, Havana, Cuba.
- 1999—Alice in the Center of Wonders. Pablo de la Torriente Brau Cultural Center, Havana, Cuba.
- 1999—Alicia Leal ("A Guitarra Limpia" concert by Carlos Varela), Pablo de la Torriente Brau Cultural Center, Havana, Cuba.
- 1999—Alicia Leal. Avellaneda Hall, National Theater of Cuba. Havana, Cuba.
- 2000—Juan Moreira and Alicia Leal. Paintings, Drawings and Mosaic Art. Meliá Varadero Hotel, Cuba.
- 2000—Mosaic Art and Paintings, Alicia Leal and Juan Moreira. José Martí Monument, Havana, Cuba.
- 2001—Alicia Leal (Graphic, Drawing and Mosaic Art). Art Gallery in Colón, Matanzas, Cuba.
- 2001—Fantasies by Two (Joint exhibit with artist Juan Moreira). Sancti Spiritus Art Gallery, Cuba.
- 2002—Unveiling Shades (Photographies). La Acacia Art Gallery, Havana, Cuba.
