= Fernando Velázquez Vigil =

Cuban artist (1950–2002)

- Fernando Velázquez Vigil
- Born: March 15, 1950; Havana, Cuba
- Died: July 31, 2002 (aged 52); Havana, Cuba
- Education: Taller de Cerámica Artística Cubanacán (1965–1967)
- Alma mater: Escuela Nacional de Bellas Artes San Alejandro (1970–1974)
- Known for: Ceramics; painting
- Awards: National Prize, II Feria de Cerámica, Isla de la Juventud (1983); Prize, I and III Bienal de Cerámica de Pequeño Formato Amelia Peláez (1989, 1993); Prize and Grand Prize René Portocarrero, Salón de Artes Plásticas UNEAC'90, Museo Nacional de Bellas Artes, Havana (1990)
- Elected: Founding member, Asociación Cubana de Artesanos Artistas (ACAA) (1980)

Fernando Velázquez Vigil (born Havana, Cuba; March 15, 1950 – died Havana; July 31, 2002) was a Cuban artist specialising in ceramics and painting.

== Education ==
Between 1965 and 1967 he studied ceramics at the Taller de Cerámica Artística Cubanacán, Havana. From 1970 to 1974 he studied at the Escuela Nacional de Bellas Artes San Alejandro, Havana. In 1980 he was a founding member of the Asociación Cubana de Artesanos Artistas (ACAA), Havana.

== Individual exhibitions ==
In 1982 he had a solo exhibition titled Arqueología para una arqueología. Cerámicas, in the Galería Casa de Cultura de Plaza, Havana. In 1985 he presented his works in the show Cerámica, esmalte y fuego. Cerámicas de Velázquez Vigil, in the Galería Plaza Vieja, Fondo Cubano de Bienes Culturales, Havana. In 1988 he exhibited Monumento a la vida. Cerámicas Velázquez Vigil, in the Centro Provincial de Artes Plásticas y Diseño, Havana. In 1994 presented Más allá de la Tierra y el Fuego, in the Centro de Prensa Internacional, Havana.

== Collective exhibitions ==
In 1970 his works were part of the Cuba Visita Japón exhibition in Tokyo, Japan. In 1976 he was included in the Salón Permanente de Jóvenes. Pintura y Grabado, in the Museo Nacional de Bellas Artes, Havana. In 1991 some of his works were selected as part of the XLVII Concorso Internazionale della Ceramica d'Arte Contemporanea, in Faenza, Italy. In 1996 he was one of the selected artists in the show Panorama de la Cerámica Cubana Contemporánea, part of the XXXVIII Salón Anual Internacional, in the Centro Argentino de Arte Cerámica, Museo Eduardo Sivori, Buenos Aires, Argentina. In 1998 he was included in the show Tributo a la danza, in Galería Habana, Havana.

== Awards ==
In 1983 he was awarded the National Prize, II Feria de Cerámica, Isla de la Juventud, Cuba. He won a prize in the I (1989) and III (1993) Bienal de Cerámica de Pequeño Formato Amelia Peláez, in Havana. In 1990 he won the Prize and Grand Prize René Portocarrero at the Salón de Artes Plásticas UNEAC'90, seen at the Museo Nacional de Bellas Artes, in Havana.

== Collections ==
His works can be found in the collection of the Museo de la Cerámica, Castillo de la Real Fuerza, Havana. (Room III: Revolutionary Triumph)
