= Mariano Suárez del Villar =

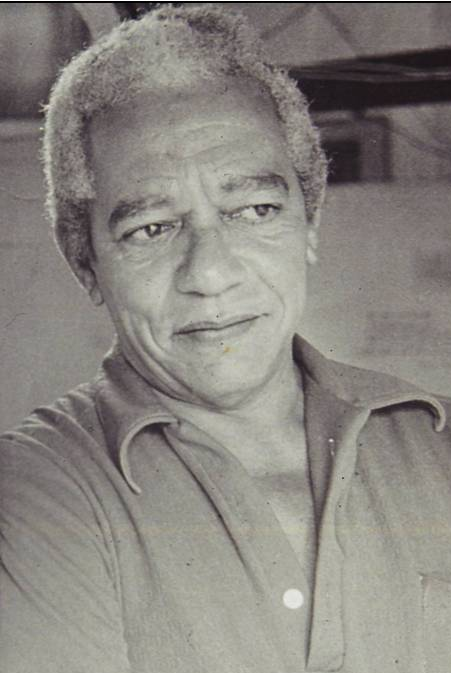
- Born: Mariano Arnaldo Suárez del Villar y Álvarez; 1929; Havana, Cuba
- Died: February 11, 1996 (aged 66–67); Havana, Cuba
- Known for: Painting, composition, radio musicalization
- Style: Surrealism
- Movement: Grupo Origen
- Website: marianosuarezdelvillar.org

Mariano Arnaldo Suárez del Villar y Álvarez (Havana, Cuba, 1929 – Havana, Cuba, 1996) was a Cuban surrealist painter, composer, and radio musicalizer. He contributed to the development of Cuban visual arts and music during the second half of the twentieth century. His career combined painting, radio, and musical projects, and he was one of the founders of the Grupo Origen art collective.

== Biography ==
Mariano Suárez del Villar was born in 1929 in Havana, Cuba. He developed as a painter within the surrealist tradition and gained recognition for combining symbolic and imaginative elements in his work. Alongside painting, he became active in Cuban broadcasting as a musicalizer at Radio Progreso, where he worked with major figures of Cuban music.

== Grupo Origen ==
In 1974, Suárez del Villar co-founded the Grupo Origen with Pablo Toscano and Miguel de Jesús Ocejo. The group sought to establish a new artistic language that would reflect Cuba’s cultural identity through ethnic symbiosis, moving beyond folkloric representation. Grupo Origen organized twelve exhibitions, provoking debate in Cuban intellectual circles. Although it dissolved in 1980 due to personal rather than artistic differences, it is remembered as an influential collective in the Cuban visual arts scene.

== Art and music ==
Suárez del Villar’s creative practice moved fluidly between painting and music. He was active as a composer and musicalizer for radio, and his artistic contributions extended to collaborations with other musicians. His versatility allowed him to engage with both popular and experimental expressions of Cuban culture.
