= Osvaldo Salas =

Cuban photographer

- Born: Osvaldo Eustasio Salas Freire; March 29, 1914; Havana, Republic of Cuba
- Died: May 5, 1992 (aged 78); Havana, Cuba
- Known for: Photograph of Ernest Hemingway and Fidel Castro

Osvaldo Eustasio Salas Freire (March 29, 1914 – May 5, 1992), was a Cuban-American photographer, remembered for his famous image of Ernest Hemingway and Fidel Castro in Cuba, circa 1960, and for his prolific documentation of American Major League Baseball—and, in particular, the influx of minority players—during the 1950s, all of which now resides in the collection of the National Baseball Hall of Fame.

== Early life and career ==
Born in Havana, Cuba, Salas was the first of three children raised by Antonio Salas Martinez and Ramona Freyre.

== Notable photos by Salas ==
- Sugar Ray Robinson with training bag (1953)
- Felix Montemayor, Roman Mejias and Roberto Clemente (May 30, 1955)
- Archie Moore and Rocky Marciano (1956)
- Baseball Friction in Cuba (1959)
- Ernest Hemingway with Fidel Castro after a Fishing Tournament, June 11, 1960 (1960)

== Exhibitions ==
Group exhibitions of his works include: in 1967, Expo’67, Pabellón Cubano, Montreal; 1985, County Hall, London. 2000, Cuba, A Photographic Journey, The College of Santa Fe;

== Collections ==
His works are in the collections of the National Baseball Hall of Fame and Museum, the Museum of Fine Arts, Houston, the Smithsonian American Art Museum, Casa de las Américas, Havana, Cuba; Center for Cuban Studies, New York, NY; Centro Studi e Archivio della Comunicazione, Parma University, Parma, Italy; Fototeca de Cuba, Havana, Cuba; Galleria IF, Milan, Italy; Galleria Il Diafragma Kodak, Milan, Italy; Maison de la Culture de la Seine Saint-Denis, Paris, France; Museo Nacional de Bellas Artes, Havana, Cuba.
