= Agustín Cárdenas =

Cuban sculptor (1927–2001)

- Born: Agustín Cárdenas Alfonso; April 10, 1927; Matanzas, Cuba
- Died: February 9, 2001 (aged 73); Havana, Cuba
- Education: Escuela Nacional de Bellas Artes "San Alejandro"
- Known for: Sculpture
- Movement: Surrealism
- Awards: Ordre des Arts et des Lettres (1976); Premio Nacional de Artes Plásticas (1995)

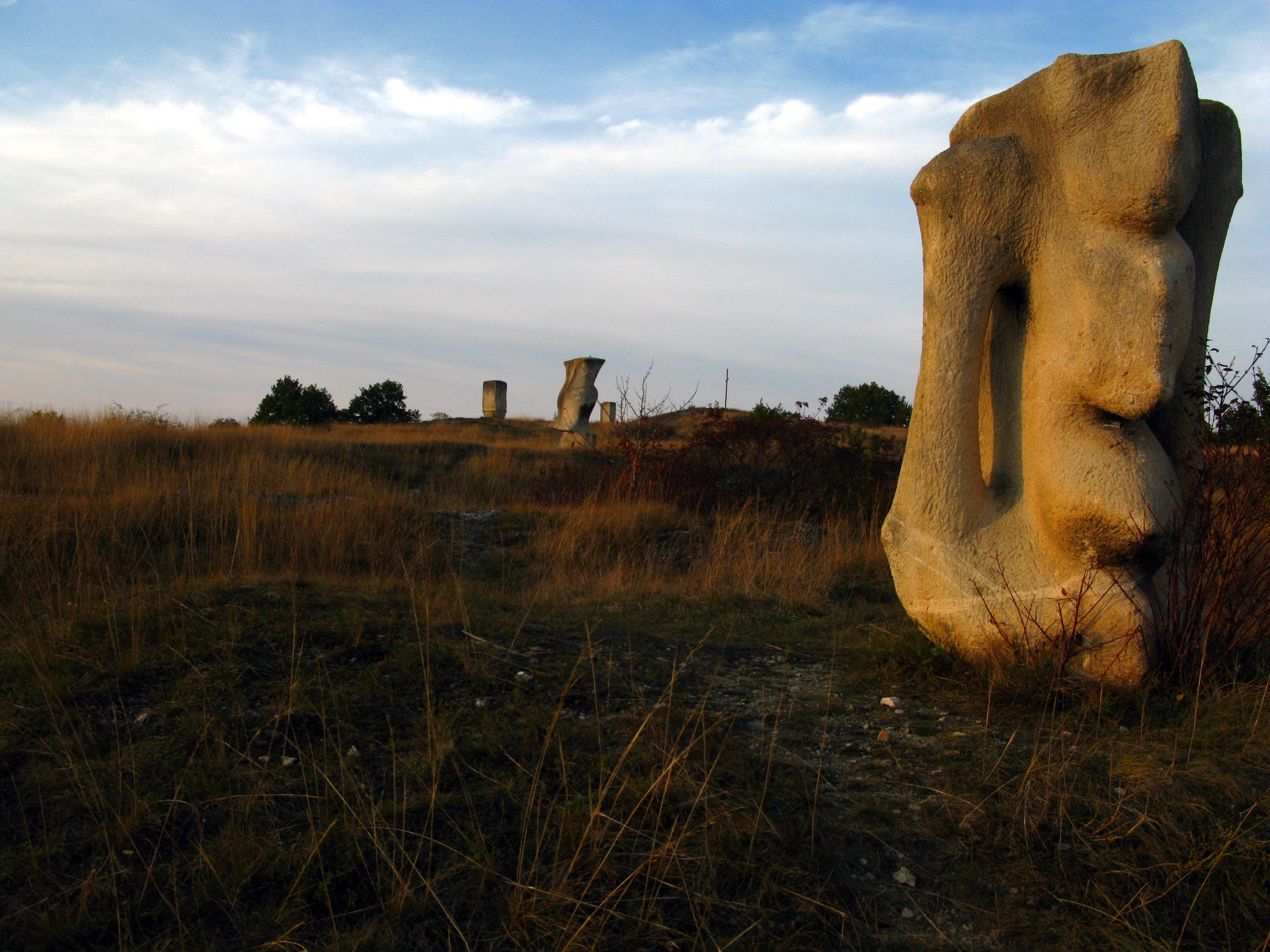
Untitled (1961), sculpture by Auguste Cardenas in the area above the Roman quarry in Sankt Margarethen im Burgenland near Lake Neusiedl.

Agustín Cárdenas Alfonso (April 10, 1927, Matanzas, Cuba – February 9, 2001, Havana, Cuba) was a Cuban sculptor who was active in the Surrealist movement in Paris. His sculpture was influenced by Brâncuși, Henry Moore, and Jean Arp. Poet André Breton said of his artistic hand that it was "efficient as a dragonfly."

== Biography ==
Cárdenas was a descendant of slaves from Senegal and the Congo, and was born in Matanzas, a major port in the sugar industry. In Cuba, Cárdenas studied under Juan José Sicre, and from 1943 to 1949 at Escuela Nacional de Bellas Artes “San Alejandro” in Havana. He was member of Asociación de Grabadores de Cuba (AGC) from 1951 to 1955, and of the creative group Los Once from 1953 to 1955. Cárdenas' work was exhibited several times in 1952 "Pintura Ávila Escultura Cárdenas" at Palacio de los Trabajadores in Havana, and in 1955 he exhibited a selection of his pieces in "Agustín Cárdenas: 20 esculturas" at the Museo Nacional de Bellas Artes de La Habana.

He settled in Paris in 1955 and in 1957 joined the Surrealist movement there. His work incorporated aspects of his African heritage and of Dogon totems.

In 1987, his work was in the Corea Gallery, Seoul, South Korea. In 1993, his work was exhibited in "Agustín Cárdenas" in the Museo Nacional de Bellas Artes de La Habana and in 2002, Cárdenas's work was presented in "Desires and Grace" at the Haim Chanin Fine Arts Gallery in New York City.

Cárdenas also took part in many group exhibitions such as the IV Exposición Nacional de Pintura, Escultura y Grabado at the Centro Asturiano in Havana in 1950 and the "Exposition Internationale du Surréalisme Eros" at the Galerie Daniel Cordier in Paris in 1960. He participated in the II Bienal Internacional de la Pequeña Escultura in 1973 in Budapest, Hungary and the exhibition of Abstract Art "Tono a Tono" in the Salón de la Solidaridadin the Hotel Habana Libre in Havana in 2000.

Cárdenas has been awarded with several distinctions during his life, including Segundo Premio VI Salón Nacional de Pintura y Escultura, Salones del Capitolio Nacional, Havana, by the Cuban government (1953) and the Silver Medal XXXVII, Salón de Bellas Artes, Círculo de Bellas Artes, Havana (1955). In 1976, he was awarded with the Ordre des Arts et des Lettres in France and the Fujisankey Biennal Prize at the Hakone Open-Air Museum, Fujisankey, Japan. Also in 1995 he received Premio Nacional de Artes Plásticas by the Cuban Ministry of Culture.

His works can be found in many permanent collections around the world, including the Centre National des Arts du Cirque, Fonds National d’Art Contemporain and Musée de la Sculpture en Plein Air in Paris; the Musée d’Art et d’Industrie at Saint-Étienne, France; the Hakone Open-Air Museum, Hakone, Japan; the Musée d’Art Contemporain, Argel, Algeria; Museo de Bellas Artes in Caracas, Venezuela, Kendall Art Center, Miami, Florida, and in the Museo Nacional de Bellas Artes de La Habana in Havana, Cuba.
