= Instituto Superior de Arte =

Schools of the arts in Cuba

Coordinates: 23.0888°N 82.4468°W

The University of Arts of Cuba / Instituto Superior de Arte (ISA) was established on 1 September 1976 (49 years ago) by the Cuban government as a school for the arts. Its original structure had three schools: Music, Visual Arts, and Performing Arts.

== History ==
The ISA has four schools, the previous three and one for Arts and Audiovisual Communication Media. There are also four teaching schools in the provinces, one in Camagüey, two in Holguín and one in Santiago de Cuba.

ISA offers pre-degree and post-degree courses, as well as a wide spectrum of brief and extension courses, including preparation for Cuban and foreign professors for a degree of Doctor on Sciences in Art.

Predegree education has increased to five careers: Music, Visual Arts, Theatre Arts, Dance Arts and Arts and Audiovisual Communication Media.

In 1996, the ISA established the National Award of Artistic Teaching, conceived for recognizing a lifework devoted to arts teaching.

== Faculty ==
- José Villa Soberón, professor of sculpture
- Evelio Tieles, Professor and Consultant Professor of Violin (School of Music)

== Notable alumni ==
- Alexandre Arrechea (born 1970), Cuban artist and sculptor
- Quisqueya Henríquez (born 1966), Cuban-born Dominican Republic multidisciplinary contemporary artist
- Reynier Leyva Novo (born 1983), contemporary and conceptual artist

== See also ==
- Cuban National Schools of Art, 1960s predecessor to the ISA
