= Ann Henderson =

Ann, Anne or Anna Henderson may refer to:

- Ann Henderson (sculptor) (1921–1976), Scottish sculptor
- Ann Henderson (politician) (1941–2002), Australian politician
- Ann Henderson (campaigner), Scottish labour campaigner and rector of the University of Edinburgh
- Anne Henderson (author) (born 1949), Australian writer
- Anne Henderson (public servant), chair of the Parades Commission of Northern Ireland
- Anne Henderson (educator), American museum educator
- Annie Henderson, I Know Why the Caged Bird Sings character
- Anna Henderson (cyclist) (born 1998), British racing cyclist
- Anna Henderson (soccer) (born 2000), American soccer player
- Anna Minerva Henderson (1887–1987), teacher, civil servant, and poet from Saint John, New Brunswick

== See also ==
- Henderson (surname)
- Ann Henderson-Sellers (born 1952), Australian professor of environment and geography
