= Galería Pedro Esquerré =

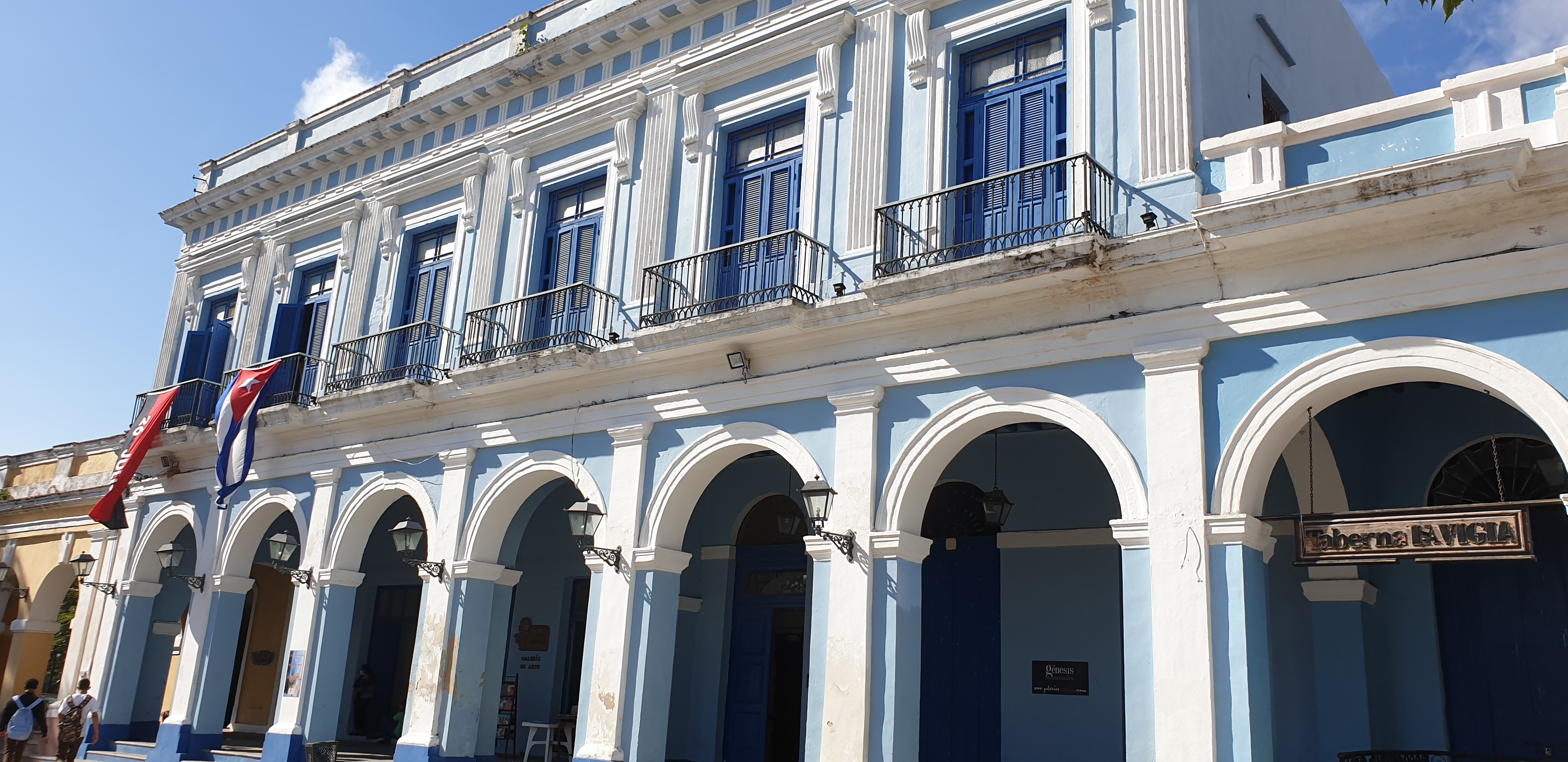
- Established: 1960
- Location: Matanzas Cuba
- Coordinates: 23.045357°N 81.574475°W
- Type: Museum, Art Center
- Collections: Contemporary Cuban Art
- Director: Juan Francisco González
- Owners: Provincial Council of Fine Arts, Matanzas

The Galería Pedro Esquerré, of the Provincial Council of Fine Arts and Cultural Heritage of Matanzas, is a Museum and Art Center, in Matanzas, Cuba.

== History ==
The Galería Pedro Esquerré occupies the building known as "La Vigía", built between 1880 and 1830 on the land that was first destined for the Customs House and the Corregidor. It was called The San José de la Vigía Battery, a building which later lent its name to the square, and is of high historical and architectural value, it has eclectic-style arcades, and is part together with the Sauto Theater and the Museo Provincial of a group of five 19th-century buildings that make up the Plaza de la Vigía in the city of Matanzas. It is considered one of the most representative buildings in the city and is declared a historical heritage.

Since 1960 its spaces have been occupied by the Galería Pedro Esquerré, museum and art Center of the Provincial Council of Fine Arts, Matanzas. Currently, the building also houses a residential area on the upper floor and a coffeehouse in the basement. Since 1985, the editorial Ediciones Vigía occupies part of the ground floor, Vigía being a publisher of handmade books of art, and the only one of its kind in the country.

== Exhibitions ==
Venue for the delivery of the National and Provincial Awards for the Restoration and Conservation of 2020 and 2021, The museum is currently directed by Juan Francisco González, director of the Provincial Council of Visual Arts in Matanzas. It received its name in homage to the plastic artist Pedro Esquerré from the province of Matanzas, painter of the work "The trial of Osiris", a mural appreciated by Che Guevara in 1960.

They museum organizes exhibitions of contemporary art by Cuban and international artists and collaborated in various cultural activities. It appears as the venue for the Havana Biennial on several occasions and collaborated on the most international project to date in Matanzas: "Rios intermitentes" presented in 2019 by María Magdalena Campos-Pons with artists such as Carrie Mae Weems, Melvin Edwards, Paul Stephen Benjamin, Alicia Henry, and Jamaal B. Sheets.

After a forced close down during the COVID pandemic in 2020, the Gallery reopened in 2021 with the exhibition "Seguimos en combate", curated by Alexander Lobaina and featuring local artists like Erich González Triana, Alejandro Vega Baró, Adversi Alonso, Alexis Plasencia García, Adrián Socorro among others.

In collaboration with The Ludwig Foundation of Cuba, the Center showed in May 2022 the exhibition Vest + Menté with works by Swiss-Cuban artist Daniel Garbade. His oversized painted garments tell the story of his family from Matanzas.

== Gallery ==
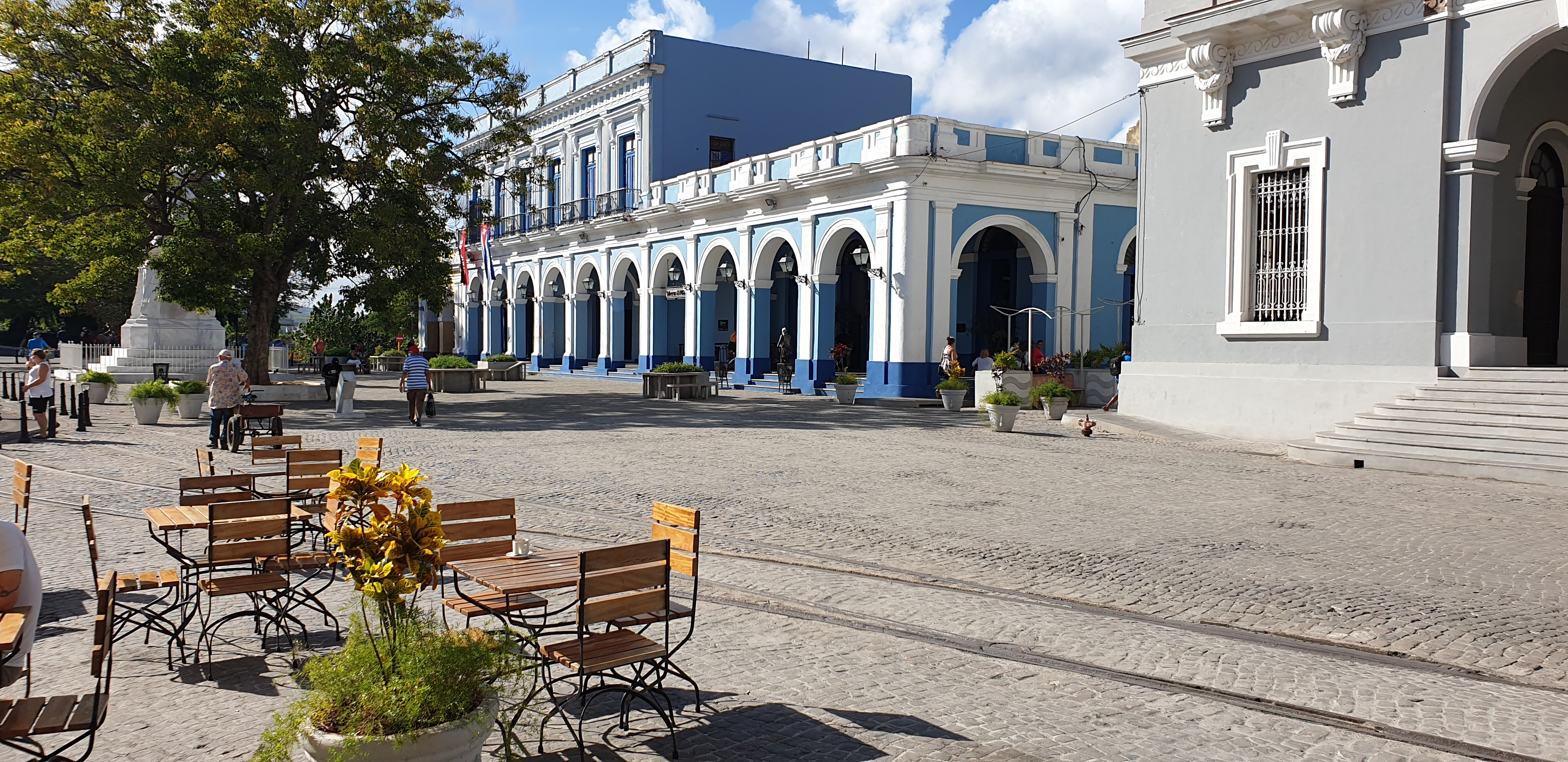
Galería Pedro Esquerré Matanzas

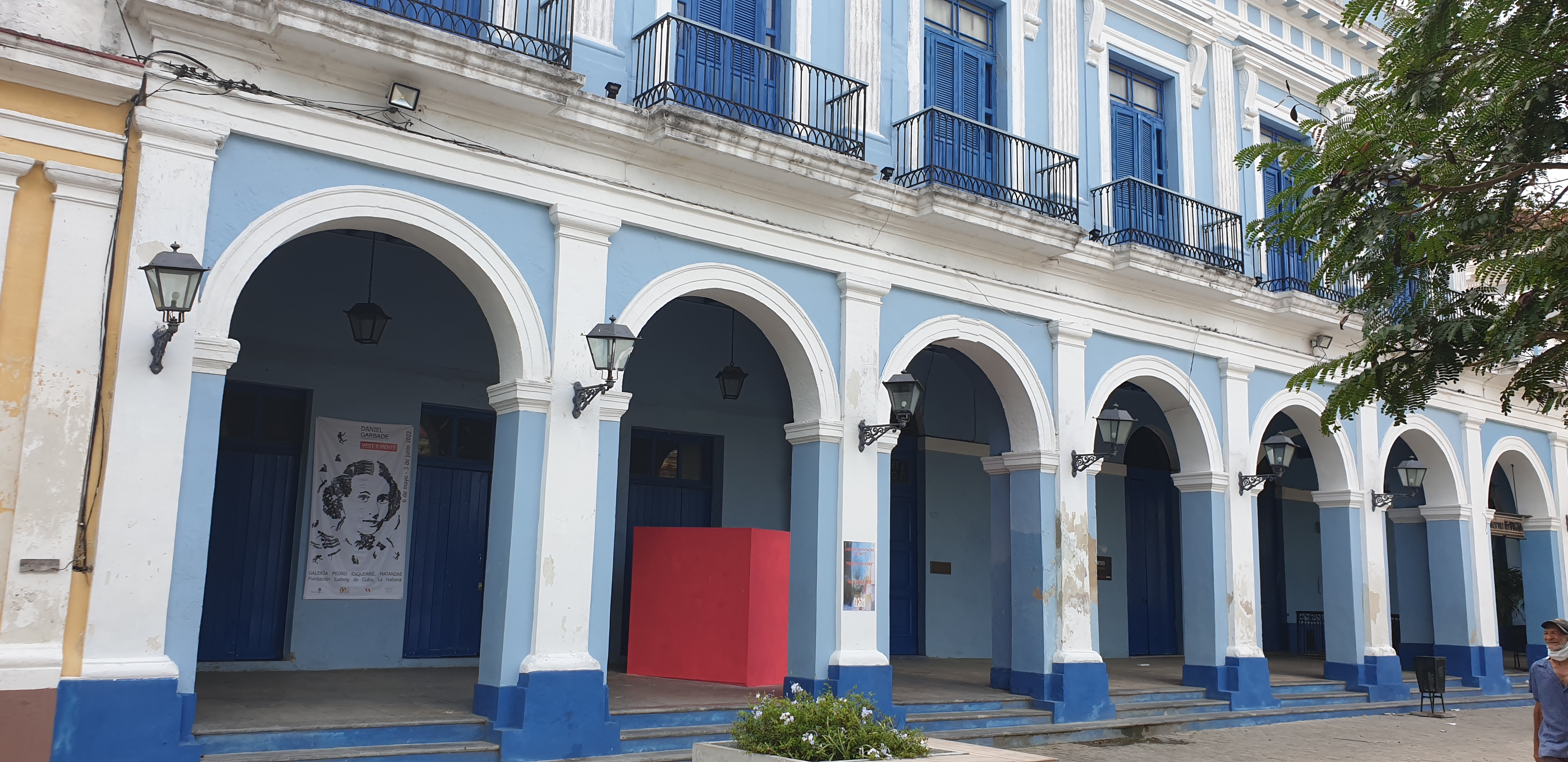
Facade

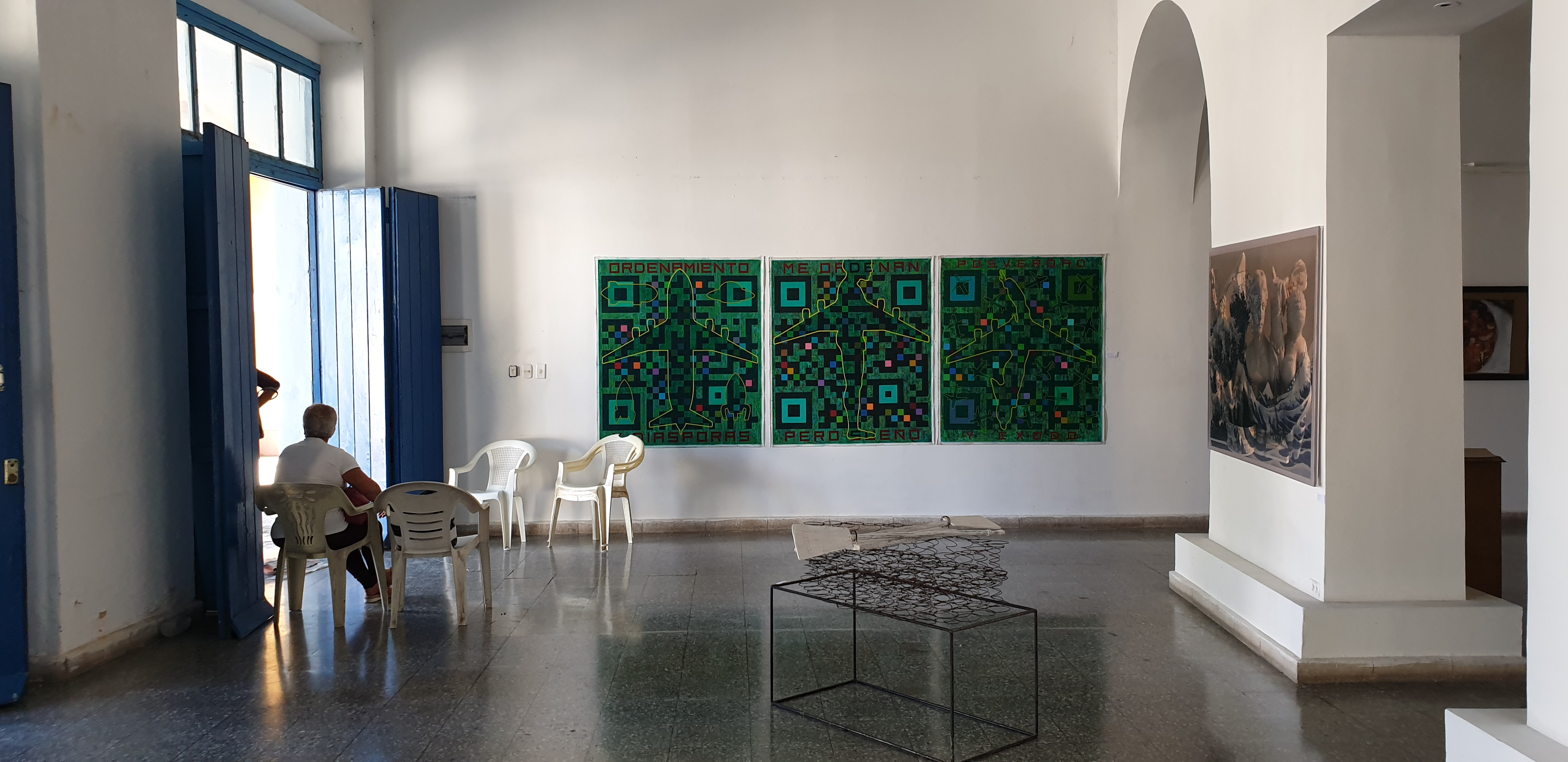
Entrance Museum

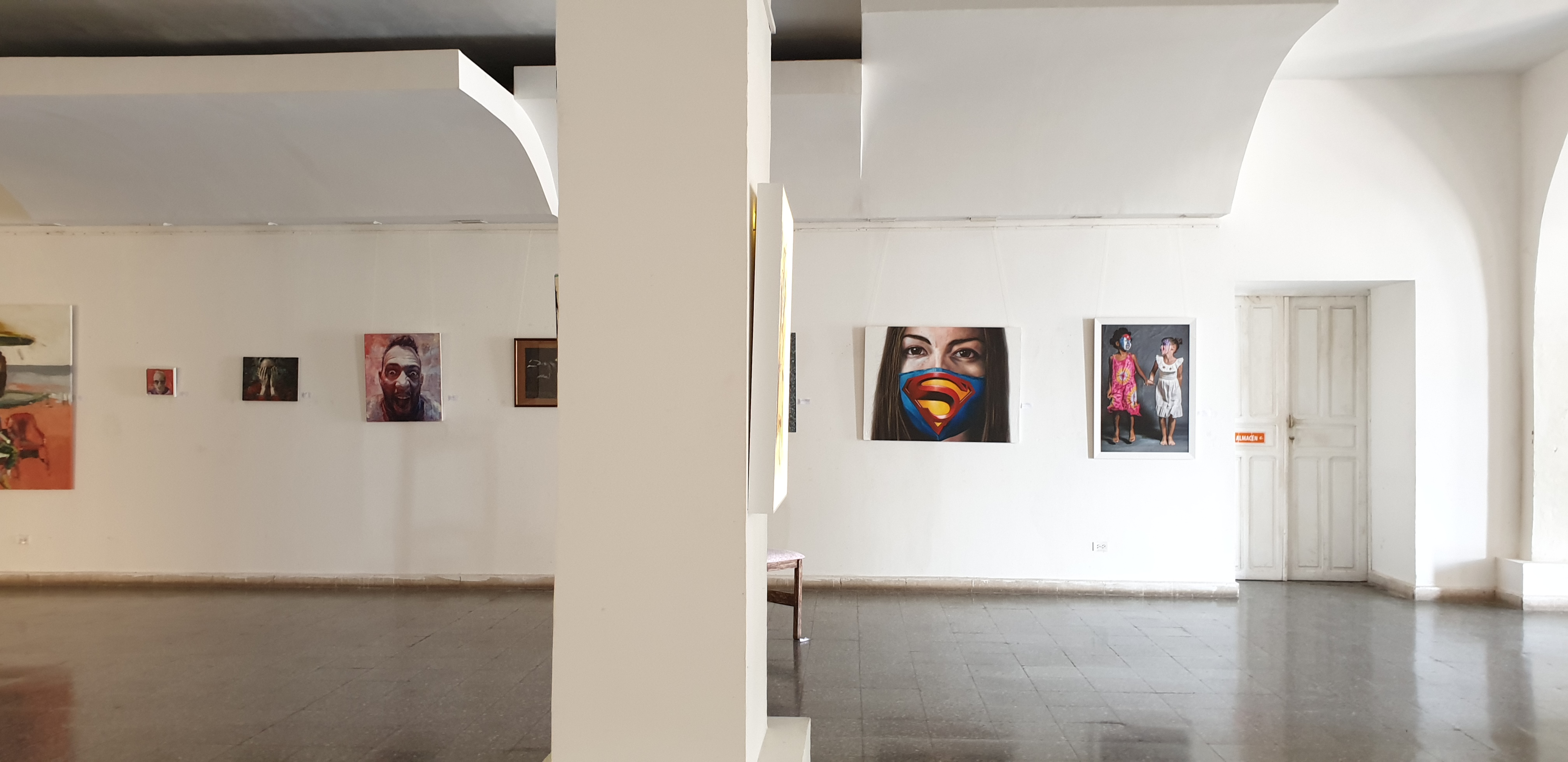
Museum of Cuban Art

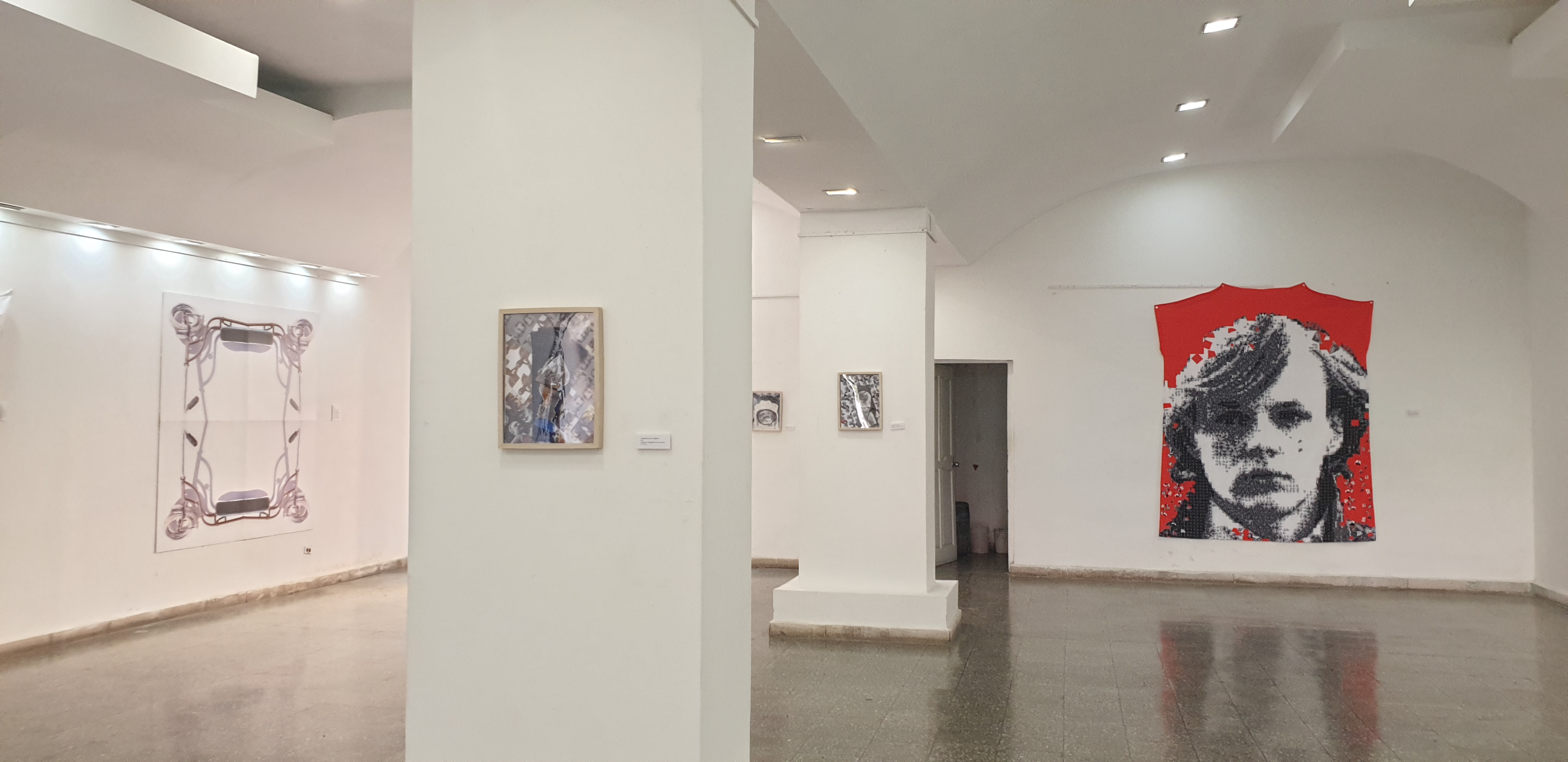
Galería Pedro Esquerré, exhibition Vest+Menté

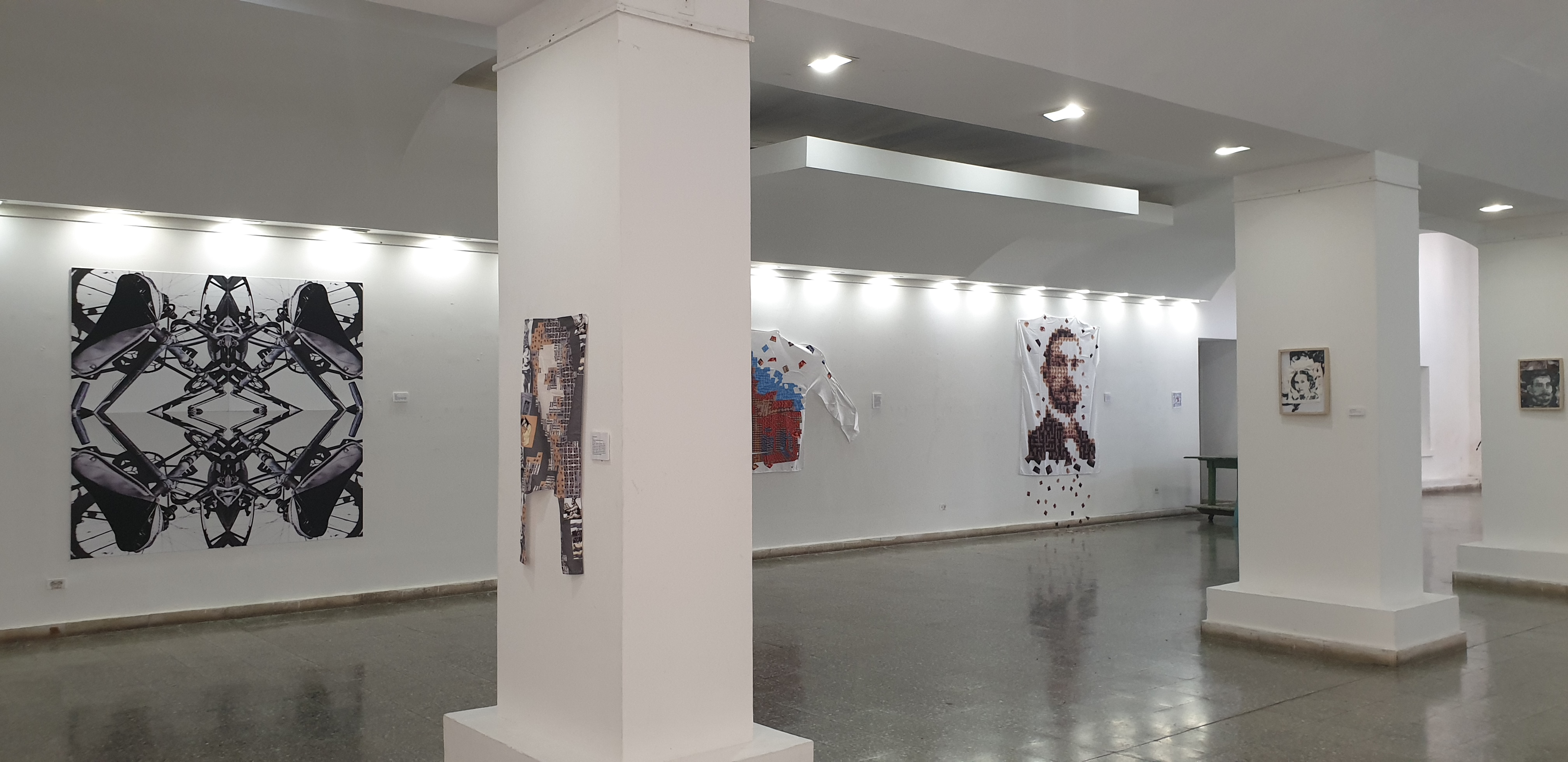
Galería Pedro Esquerré, exhibition

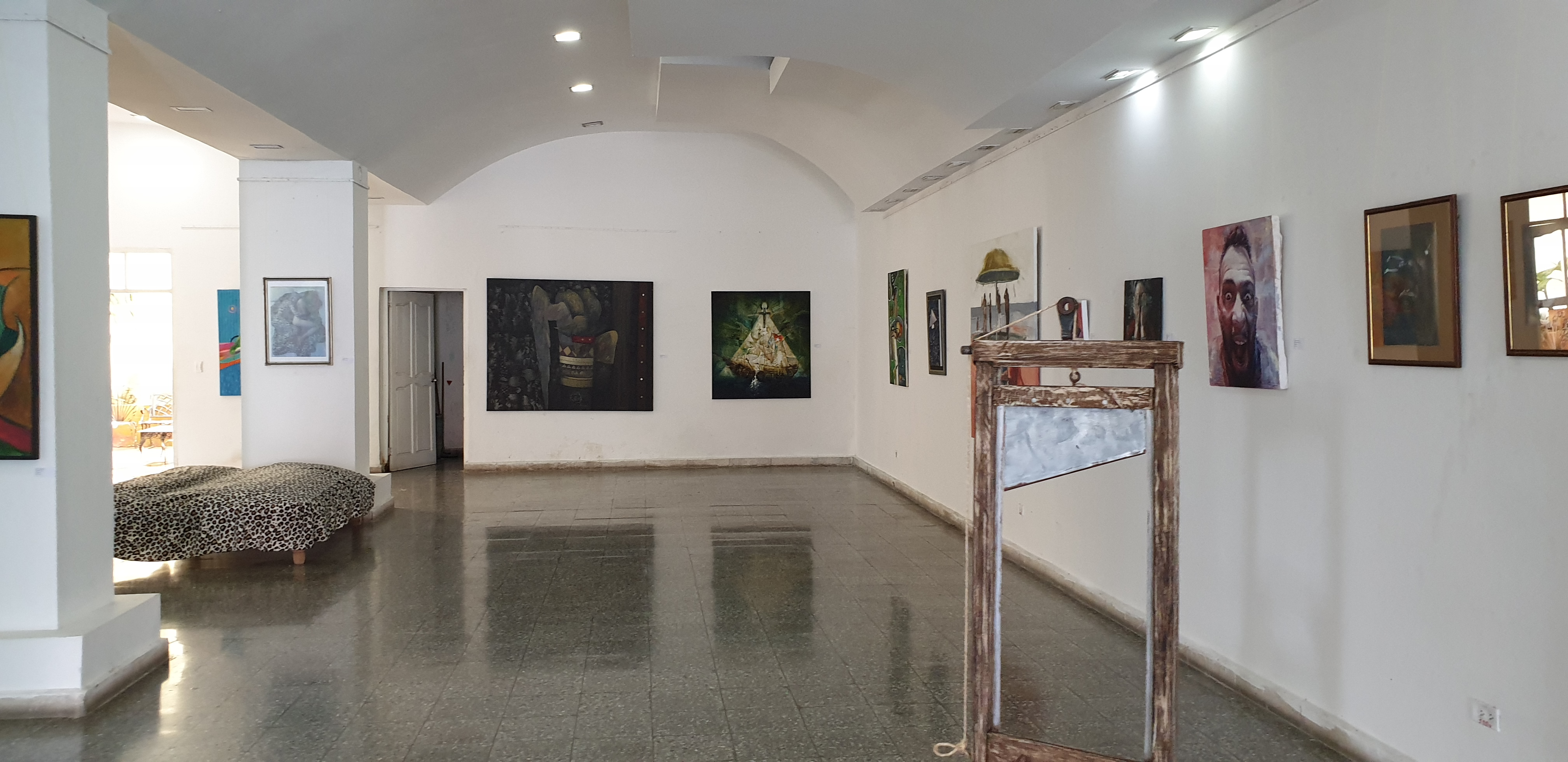
Exhibition at the Gallery
