= Sauto Theater =

Coordinates: 23°2′45.92″N 81°34′24.86″W

- Teatro Sauto
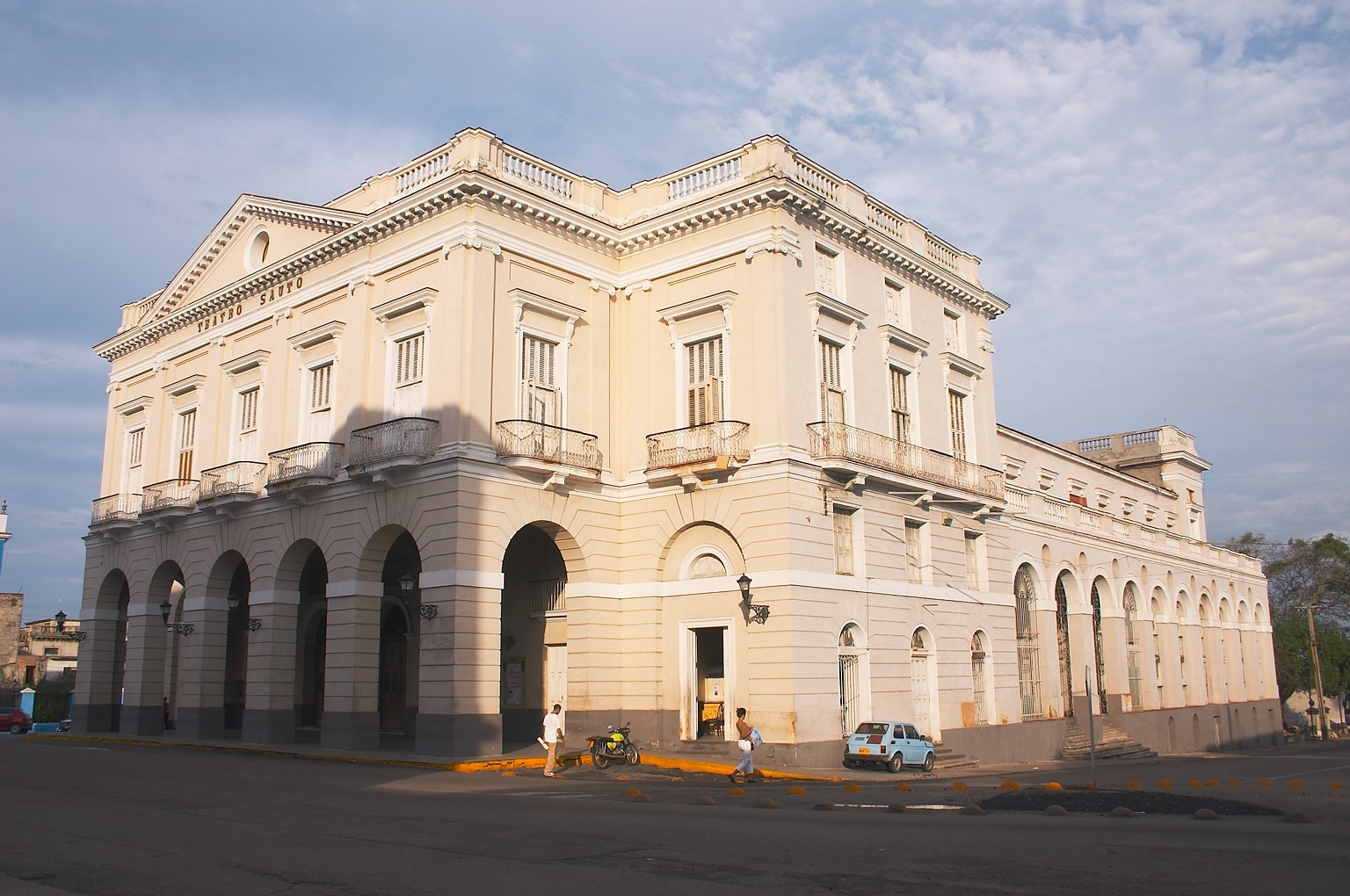
- Sauto Theater
- Former names: Esteban Theater (Teatro Esteban)

General information
- Type: Theater
- Architectural style: Neo-Classical
- Location: Plaza de la Vigía in Matanzas, Matanzas, Cuba
- Construction started: 1860
- Completed: 1863
- Inaugurated: April 6, 1863

Design and construction
- Architect: Daniele Dell'Aglio

The Sauto Theater is a neoclassical theater in Matanzas, Cuba. It opened in 1863 and was declared a National Monument in 1978.

== History ==
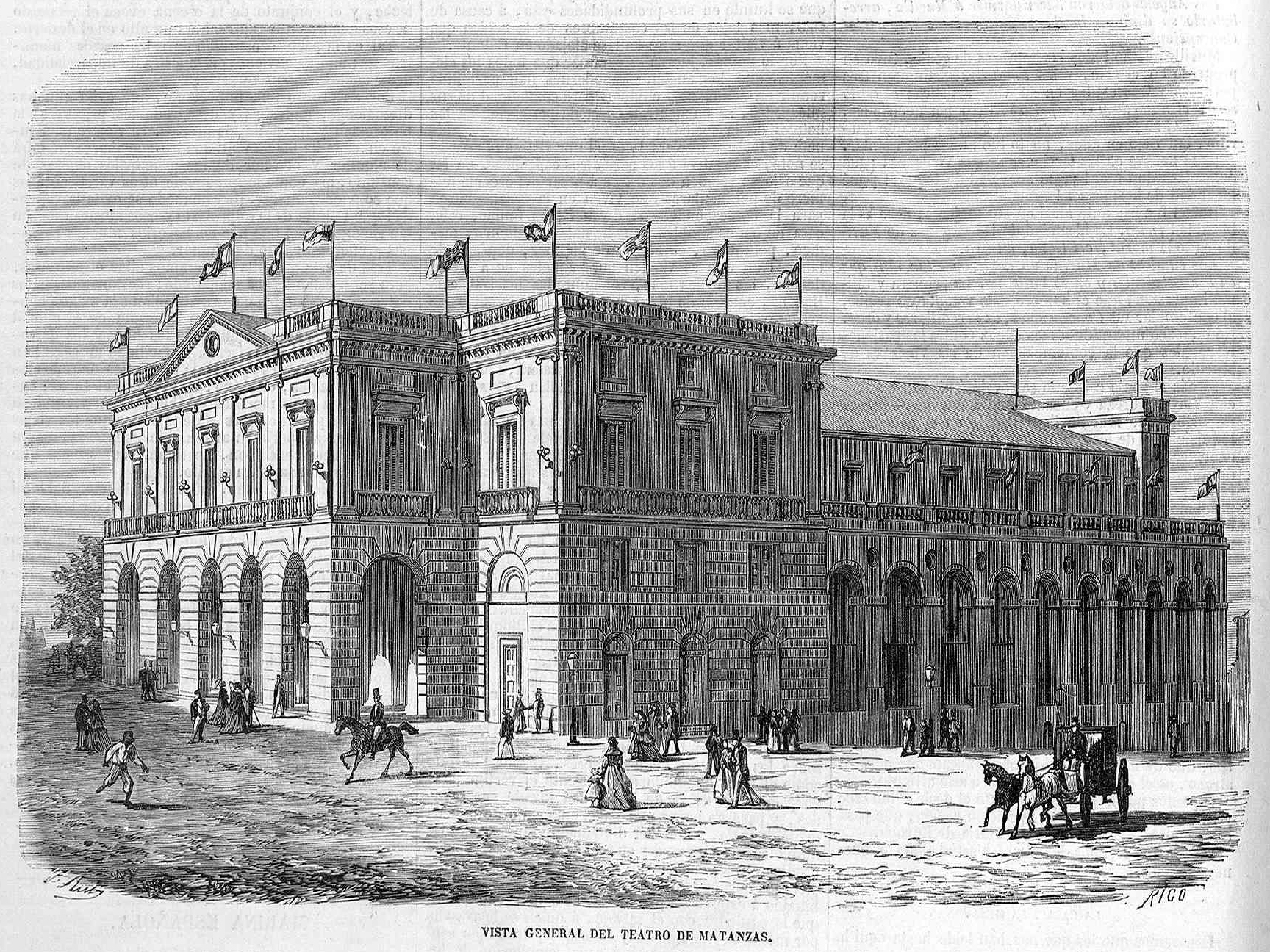
Sauto Theater in 1866, El Museo Universal

The theater opened in 1863 as the Teatro Esteban, named after the Civil Governor of Matanzas at the time, Pedro Esteban y Arranz. Soon it adopted the last name of Ambrosio de la Concepción Sauto, a patron of the arts who contributed much to its construction.

Due to the proximity of Matanzas to Havana, the Sauto Theater was visited regularly by the great performers who appeared in Havana. The Sauto attracted world famous performers such as French actress Sarah Bernhardt (in Camille in 1887), Russian dancer Anna Pavlova in 1945, Cuban composer José White Lafitte, Italian opera singer Enrico Caruso, and Spanish guitarist Andrés Segovia.

The theatre was declared a National Monument in 1978. It had been renovated in the 1960s and again in the 1980s, but by the 2010s, it needed a deeper renovation plan The Teatro was closed for renovations between 9 February 2010 and 2018.

== Description ==
The U-shaped 775-seat theatre is almost entirely covered with wood-panelling. It has three balconies, and its floor can be raised to convert the auditorium into a ballroom. The original theater curtain is a painting of the Puente de la Concordia over the Yumurí River. The lobby is graced by Carrara marble statues of Greek goddesses and the main hall ceiling bears paintings of the muses.

Two rivers (the Yumuri and the San Juan) flow below the building.

Considered the most elegant and functional of 19th-century Cuban theatres, it has become a symbol of the city, so much so that the great Mexican muralist Diego Rivera once said, "I recognize Matanzas by the Sauto."

It forms, together with the Junco Palace of the Provincial Museum and the La Vigía building of the Provincial Council of Fine Arts, the Pedro Esquerré Gallery Museum, the Historical Ensemble of the Plaza de las Armas. The theater is a sub-venue of the International Ballet Festival and Mayo Teatral. It presents programmes about five days a week.

== See also ==
- Circuba
