= María Magdalena Campos Pons =

Cuban-born American artist

María Magdalena Campos-Pons
- Born: August 22, 1959; Matanzas, Cuba
- Education: Escuela Nacional de Arte, Havana; Instituto Superior de Arte, Havana; post grad studies at Massachusetts College of Art and Design, Boston
- Known for: Photography, installation, performance, painting, drawing, sculpture, audiovisual collaboration
- Spouse: Neil Leonard

María Magdalena Campos-Pons (born July 22, 1959) is a Cuban-born artist based in Nashville, Tennessee. Campos-Pons works primarily in photography, performance, audiovisual media, and sculpture. She is considered a "key figure" among Cuban artists who found their voice in a post-revolutionary Cuba. Her art deals with themes of Cuban culture, gender and sexuality, multicultural identity (Cuban, Chinese, and Nigerian) as well as interracial family (Cuban-American), and religion/spirituality (in particular, Roman Catholicism and Santería).

== Early life and education ==
Campos-Pons was born in Matanzas, Cuba, in 1959 and grew up in a sugar plantation town called La Vega, Calimete in Cuba. Her paternal great-grandparents were Yoruba. She also has Chinese and Hispanic heritage. Her African ancestors, who were brought over by sugar plantation owners in the late 19th century, passed down traditions from Africa that influenced and became part of Campos-Pons's art. The African side of her family worked as slaves on sugar plantations and as domestic servants. The Chinese side of her family worked as indentured servants in sugar mills.

When she was young, Campos-Pons relates that during a trip to the National Cuban Museum of Fine Art, she distinctly felt that black Cubans were conspicuously missing from the art. She did not feel as though black Cubans were equally represented.

Campos-Pons has described much of her art education as very traditional, rooted in drawing and sculpture. She trained at the Escuela National de Arte in Havana between 1976 and 1979. From 1980 to 1989, she attended Havana's Instituto Superior de Arte (ISA). The ISA allowed students to be exposed to international artistic movements and develop art that drew from Cuba's unique "mixed traditions and cultures." Her ISA painting professor Antonio Vidal, a Cuban abstractionist, had a lasting impact on her work as a painter and she presented his work, along with her work with Neil Leonard at documenta 14 in Kassel, Germany.

Campos-Pons conducted her post graduate studies at Massachusetts College of Art and Design in 1988. While there, she created her first film that was scored by composer, saxophonist, Neil Leonard, whom she married in 1989. Before moving to Boston in 1991 to live with Leonard, she took a fellowship in Banff, Alberta. The artist also taught at the School of the Museum of Fine Arts at Tufts University. Since 2017, she has lived in Nashville, Tennessee.

== Career ==
María Magdalena Campos Pons at the Dakar Biennale in 2004.

Between 1986 and 1989 Campos-Pons was professor of Painting and Aesthetic at the Instituto Superior de Arte. She started exhibiting internationally in 1984. In the late 1980s, her art work gained "international recognition" with her abstract paintings dealing with female sexuality. Her work coincides with the rise of the New Cuban Art movement. The New Cuban Art movement began as a reaction against the repressive aspects of the Cuban state and the introduction of conceptual art. The movement was less focused on technical skill and more on creating an art that was genuinely Cuban. A large part of this artistic movement was the introduction of Afro-Cuban presence, both as artists and within the art itself. Humor and spirituality were major themes in New Cuban Art. Her early work, often consisting of separate, shaped canvases, suggested fragmentation of the female self and referenced Afro-Cuban myths. She also explored reproductive rights and feminism through her art.

Campos-Pons work often revolves around feminist ideologies. In an interview with Lynne Bell, she stated: "My work in Cuba looked at issues of sexuality, women's place in society, and the representation of women in the history of art". As there was no larger feminist movement in Cuba, it was only through the expression of art through artists like Campos-Pon and others that feminism was kept in the spotlight and popular consciousness.

In the 1990s, she explored her family's ties to slavery and the Santería tradition carried over by her Yoruba family members. Santería is a spiritual practice which was developed by African slaves in Cuba by combining influences from Yoruba and Roman Catholic religious systems. Santería is often referred to as a "woman's religion" as it is a religion shaped by women and practiced largely by women. Campos-Pons uses Santería as a theme in her art to identify her Nigerian ancestry and Cuban heritage. She explores the rituals and symbols of Santería in some of her work from this time period. The Seven Powers Come by the Sea (1992) and The Seven Powers (1994) are installations that address slavery and make mention of various Yoruba gods and goddesses. During the 1990s sound became increasingly important in Campos-Pons' work and Leonard created electronic sound for all of her videos and installations. Sound for the installations often used Leonard's music incorporating fragments of Campos-Pons voice and field recordings, often heard via speakers that surrounded visitors.

After 1994, there was a shift in Campos-Pons's work, and it became somewhat ethnographic." This work is largely autobiographical and has tended to examine her ancestors' relationship with slavery and the sugar industry. Her work investigates "a felt history," through the intersection of "non-spoken narratives" and "resilient culture". She started using large-format photographs which were often arranged into diptychs, triptychs or other configurations. These works are reminiscent of works by Lorna Simpson and Carrie Mae Weems.

In the early 2000s, she returned to elements of abstraction and minimalism that were reminiscent of her early work, and admittedly influenced by her Cuban professor Antonio Vidal.

According to Campos-Pons' artist statement, her work "renders elements of personal history and persona that have universal relevance...My subjects are my Afro-Cuban relatives as well as myself...The salient tie to familiar and cultural history vastly expands for me the range of photographic possibilities." Campos-Pon is interested in showing "crosscultural" and "crossgenerational" themes dealing with race and gender as "expressed in symbols of matriarchy and maternity." Campos-Pons says: "Of merging ideas, merging of ethnicities, merging of traditions... I am as much black, Cuban, woman, Chinese. I am this tapestry of all of that, and the responses to that could be very complicated and could include even anguish and pain." Other ideas that her work explores includes exile, immigration, memory and Cuba itself.

Her art has been shown in scores of solo and group exhibitions, including solo shows at the Museum of Modern Art in New York City; the Venice Biennale; the Johannesburg Biennial; the First Liverpool Biennial; the Dakar Biennale in Senegal; and the Guangzhou Triennial in China. Campos-Pons's work is in the collections of the Smithsonian Institution, the Art Institute of Chicago, the National Gallery of Canada, the Victoria and Albert Museum, the Museum of Modern Art, The Museum of Fine Arts, the Pérez Art Museum Miami, and the Fogg Art Museum.

Campos-Pons teaches at Vanderbilt University, Nashville, Tennessee, where she is the Cornelius Vanderbilt Endowed Chair of Fine Arts. In 2020, and as a result of the nationwide social unrest, she launched "Engine for Art, Democracy and Justice", which is defined as a Vanderbilt University "trans-institutional series of virtual conversations and artistic collaborations focused on healing at a time of significant social unrest."

Her diptych photograph, The House was included in the 2022 exhibition Afro-Atlantic Histories at the National Gallery of Art.

== Collaboration with Neil Leonard ==
Between 1988 and 2018, Maria Magdalena Campos-Pons and Neil Leonard created thirty-eight audio visual works together. By the time they met in 1988, Leonard had created sound for video installations and performances by Tony Oursler, Constance De Jong and Sam Durant. After meeting Leonard, sound became increasingly important in Campos-Pons's practice. She collaborated with Leonard to incorporate spoken word, music and field recordings into the work, and expand her practice to include time-based presentation. Leonard called on leading practitioners of Cuban religious music to play for their installation, video and performances including Los Muñequitos de Matanzas, Los Hermanos Arango, Ramon Garcia Perez (Afrocuba de Matanzas), Roman Diaz (Yoruba Andabo) and Oriente Lopez to perform with them.

Leonard created electroacoustic compositions for Campos-Pons' first film and videos, Rito de Iniciación (1988) and Baño Sagrado (1990) created as a result of a residency at Western Front, Vancouver. From 2010-2017, Campos-Pons created their most mature collaborations, balancing a sonic/visual content and ideas, and integrating the audio sources into sculptural components. During this period, Leonard focused on how global marketing impacted how we listen. His work with Campos-Pons included recordings and performances made in collaboration with butchers, bartenders, street criers, former dock workers and folkloric ensembles. Leonard and Campos-Pons' Installations and processions of this period were co-authored (commissioned, planned and executed as a team), including "Llego Fefa,"11 Bienal de Havana; "Habla Madre," Guggenheim Museum; "Alchemy of the Soul," Peabody Essex Museum; "Identified," Smithsonian Institution National Portrait Gallery, "53+1=54+1+55. Letter of the Year," 55th Venice Biennale; "Matanzas Sound Map" and "Bar Matanzas," documenta 14. These pieces shifted the focus from Campos-Pons' biographical narrative to the Campos-Pons' and Leonard's interests in exploring the invisible threads connecting disparate cultures in the Americas. Art critic Holland Cotter describes Leonard's composition for the Cuban Pavilion at the 2013 Venice Biennale as a "haunting, rhythmic, chantlike score, secular spiritual music for a New World". Leonard's composition for their performance "Identified" (2016) at the Smithsonian National Portrait Gallery featured Leonard performing with multi-Grammy winning trumpeter Terence Blanchard, a folkloric Cuban ensemble and a jazz orchestra comprising students of the Duke Ellington School for the Arts. Musicians were located in the main atrium, stairwell and galleries and created a series of locations with unique sonic signatures that Campos-Pons wandered thought during the performance.

== Art ==
The following are some examples of some of Campos-Pons' art:

- "53+1=54+1+55. Letter of the Year" from 2013, by María Magdalena Campos-Pons and Neil Leonard.

This work of art was displayed in the Cuban Pavilion during the Venice Biennale of 2013. The work comprises 100 bird cages, 55 video players and 18 audio speakers. "Letter of the Year" addresses issues of home, migration, the necessity of finding and redefining the meaning of permanency and locality. Letter of the Year plays with two key sounds in Cuba today.

Video interviews in the birdcages document the reconstruction of a dialogue between Cuban residents and their family members who live abroad. Outside the cages one hears recordings of street criers, known as pregoneros, a reflection of the increased liberalization of small businesses that exists within a void of corporate control. In an accompanying guerilla performance in Piazza San Marco, Campos-Pons led a procession dressed in a "neo-Byzantine" costume combining elements of Chinese, Spanish and Afro-Caribbean attire, while Leonard performed with a hybrid ensemble of U.S., Cuban and Scottish musicians. the work was a joint production by Galleria Pack (now Galleria Giampaolo Abbondio) and Federico Luger Gallery, both from Milan.

- "Spoken Softly with Mama", from 1998, by Maria Magdalena Campos-Pons with sound by Neil Leonard (Nashville Scene).

"Spoken Softly with Mama"combines elements of sculpture, painting, photography, performance, sound, and video to explore her African/Cuban roots and to address themes of gender, race, family and history."Unfolding layers of history and experience, Campos-Pons brings to light the ephemeral qualities of everyday lives and untold stories. The artist's life and work involve a continuous engagement with her mother, sisters, family, and neighbors in Cuba. By extension, her work refers to the generations of Africans transported there in centuries past to work on sugarcane and tobacco plantations who transcended their oppression through the strength of their religious and cultural practices," says Sally Berger, Assistant Curator, Department of Film and Video, who first showed the work at the Museum of Modern Art in 1998. The installation features an immersive quadrophonic soundtrack by Neil Leonard. The work was purchased by the National Museum of Canada, Ottawa.

- "The One That Carried Fire", from 2011, by Maria Magdalena Campos-Pons (Studio International)

This work explores the creation of gender identity, and in particular deals with the construction of femininity. The One That Carried Fire consists of organic lines and shapes of flowers painted in bright reds and pink, alluding to female reproductive organs. At the bottom is Campos-Pons' self-portrait, whose natural hair holds a glowing orb connecting her to the burst of color and flowers, not only a physical connection with her femininity, but also a symbol of familial ties to her cultural heritage.

- Matanzas Sound Map from 2017, by María Magdalena Campos-Pons and Neil Leonard.

"Matanzas Sound Map" created for Documenta 14, comprises projected video, 10 discreet channels of audio (asynchronous with video). Cast glass, blown glass, handmade paper, coconut tree bark, coconuts shells, Calea stone Matanzas. The work explores the sonic landscape of Matanzas, from the harbor neighborhoods where iconic musical forms were born to remote estuaries where one imagines Cuba as it sounded before human intervention. The installation creates an aural cartography made in collaboration with sugar growers, musicians, musicologists and scientists.

== Public collections (selection) ==
Their work is included in the collection of several public institutions globally, including:

- Pérez Art Museum Miami
- Tufts University Art Galleries
- Museum of Fine Arts, Boston
- Museum of Modern Art, New York
- Smithsonian Institution
- Whitney Museum of American Art
- Art Institute of Chicago
- National Gallery of Canada
- Victoria and Albert Museum
- Fogg Art Museum, at Harvard University

== Awards ==
Campos-Pons has received many awards and recognitions, including the "Mention of Honor", in 1986 in the XVIIIème Festival International de la Peinture, Château Musée, Cagnes Sur Mer, France. In 1990 Painting Fellowship, The Banff Centre for the Arts, Alberta, Canada; in 1992 Foreign Visiting Artist Grant, Media Arts, Canada Council, Canada; in 1994 Bunting Fellowship, Mary Ingraham Bunting Institute, Radcliffe Research and Study Center, Cambridge, MA; and in 1995 Art Reach 95 Award, National Congress of Art & Design, Salt Lake City, Utah.

- 2023: MacArthur Fellow
- 2021: $50,000 Pérez Prize
- 2018: $25,000 Anonymous Was a Woman Award
- 2012: Woman of Color Award Boston, MA
- 2011: Woman of Courage Boston MA
- 2011: Hispanic Alianza Award Nashville TN
- 2009: The Jorge Hernandez Leadership in the Arts Award, MA
- 2007: Rappaport Prize MA
- 1997: The Louis Comfort Tiffany Foundation Grant, NY
- 1995: Art Reach 95 Award, National Congress of Art & Design, Salt Lake City, UT
- 1995: Bunting Fellowship, Radcliffe College at Harvard, Cambridge, MA
- 1995: New England Foundation for the Arts, Regional Fellowship, MA US
- 1992-1991: Foreign Visiting Artist Grant, Media Arts, Canada Council Painting
- 1992-1991: Fellowship, The Banff Centre, Alberta, Canada
- 1990: Painting Fellowship, The Banff Centre, Alberta, Canada
- 1989: Medal of Honor, City of Guanabacoa, Cuba
- 1985: Symposium of Scientific Studies, Research Award, Higher Institute of Art, Havana, Cuba

== Solo exhibitions ==
- 2023: María Magdalena Campos-Pons: Behold, Brooklyn Museum, J. Paul Getty Museum and Frist Art Museum
- 2021: The Rise of the Butterflies, Galerie Barbara Thumm, Berlin, Germany
- 2021: Sea and Self, Haggerty Museum of Art, Marquette University Milwaukee, Wisconsin
- 2020: New Viewings #25 Curated by Octavio Zaya, Galerie Barbara Thumm, Berlin, Germany
- 2020: In The Garden, curated by Francesca Pasini, Galleria Giampaolo Abbondio, Milan, Italy.
- 2019: Sea and Self, The Center for Women in the Arts and Humanities, Rutgers University, New Brunswick
- 2018: Like the lonely traveller: Video Works by María Magdalena Campos-Pons, Visual Arts Center, The University of Texas at Austin
- 2018: Notes on Sugar: Works by María Magdalena Campos-Pons, Christian Green Gallery, The University of Texas at Austin
- 2017: Matanzas Sound Map, documenta 14, Athens (co-commnission with Neil Leonard)
- 2017: Bar Matanzas, documenta14, Kassel (co-commnission with Neil Leonard)
- 2013: Water, WIZARD GALLERY, Milan
- 2011–2012: Journeys & Mama/Reciprocal Energy, First Center for Visual Arts (performance with Neil Leonard), Nashville
- 2010: Sugar, Smith College Museum of Art
- 2007: Maria Magdalena Campos-Pons: Everything Is Separated by Water, Bass Museum, Miami and Indianapolis Museum of Art (in collaboration with Neil Leonard)
- 2006: I Am Here, curated by Sergio Risaliti, Galleria Pack (now Galleria Giampaolo Abbondio), Milan, Italy (performance in collaboration with Neil Leonard)
- 2005: Back Yard, Dreams, Julie Saul Gallery, New York
- 2005: New Work, Bernice Steinbaum Gallery, Miami
- 2004: Threads of Memory, Dak'Art, the Biennial of Contemporary African Art, 6th edition (in collaboration with Neil Leonard)
- 2004: Elevata, Howard Yezerski Gallery, Boston
- 2004: Talking Pictures, Bernice Steinbaum Gallery, Miami
- 2004: Something New, Something Old, Schneider Gallery, Chicago
- 2003: Interiority or Hill Sided Moon, La Marrana, Montemarcello, Italy (in collaboration with Neil Leonard)
- 2003: One Thousand Ways to Say Goodbye, Henie Onstad Kunstsenter, Oslo, Norway, (in collaboration with Neil Leonard)
- 2002–2003: María Magdalena Campos-Pons, North Dakota Museum of Art, Grand Forks
- 2002: M.M. Campos-Pons, Galleria Pack (now Galleria Giampaolo Abbondio), Milan, Italy
- 2001: Nesting, Schneider Gallery, Chicago
- 2000: Nesting, Howard Yezerski Gallery, Boston
- 1998: Unfolding Desires, Hallwalls, Buffalo
- 1998: Spoken Softly with Mama, National Gallery of Canada, Ottawa,(in collaboration with Neil Leonard)
- 1998: History of People... Part I, "A Town Portrait," Lehman College, NJ
- 1998: M.M. Campos-Pons, Sustenance, Martha Schneider Gallery, Chicago
- 1997: Abridor de Caminos, Martha Schneider Gallery, Chicago
- 1997: M.M. Campos-Pons, New Work, Ambrosino Gallery, Coral Gables
- 1997: When I am not Here. Estoy Alla, The Caribbean Cultural Center, New York
- 1996: M.M. Campos-Pons, New Work, Martha Schneider Gallery, Chicago
- 1994: Recent Work, Miami Dade Community College Gallery, Miami
- 1994: History of People Who Were Not Heroes, Bunting Institute of Radcliffe College, Harvard University, Cambridge, MA
- 1993: Let me Tell You, INTAR, Latin American Gallery, New York
- 1993: Racially Inscribed Body, Akin Gallery, Boston
- 1992: Como el Cuerpo de un Hombre es un Arbol ... / ... How the Body of a Person is a Tree ..., Gallery La Centrale/Powerhouse, Montreal, Canada
- 1991: A Woman at the border/Una Mujer en la Frontera, SOHO 20 Gallery, New York
- 1991: Amuletos/Amulets, Burnaby Art Gallery, B.C., Canada
- 1990: A Woman at the Border/Una Mujer en la Frontera, Presentation Room JPL Building, Banff Centre for the Arts, Canada
- 1989: Isla/Island, Castillo de la Fuerza/Castle of Royal Force, Havana, Cuba
- 1988: Erotic Garden or Some Annotations on Hypocrisy/Jardin Erotico, Kennedy Building Gallery, Massachusetts College of Art and Design, Boston
- 1985: Acoplamientos/Coupling, Gallery L, Havana, Cuba

== Commissions ==
On April 9, 2026, the Obama Foundation announced that it had commissioned Campos-Pons to create a work for the Obama Presidential Center. Campos-Pons’s work Still Holding the Scent of Flowers, will be a mixed-media installation of the White House Rose Garden.
