= Parades Commission =

Northern Ireland public body

- Formation: 1 April 1998
- Type: Non-departmental public body
- Headquarters: Andras House; 60 Great Victoria Street; Belfast; BT2 7BB
- Chair: Anne Henderson
- Staff: 13 (2024/25)
- Website: www.paradescommission.org

The Parades Commission is a quasi-judicial non-departmental public body responsible for placing restrictions on any parades in Northern Ireland it deems contentious or offensive. It is composed of seven members, all of whom are appointed by the Secretary of State for Northern Ireland. Restrictions it can impose include a prohibition on music being played, re-routing parades to avoid contentious areas, or banning certain participants based on previous breaches of its determinations. Its rulings are usually enforced by either parade stewards or the police, though there are disputes as to whether this is done to the letter of the law in certain areas.

Parade organisers and participants are liable to arrest and prosecution for breaching any of the commission's rulings, although no-one has been charged since the commission was established in 1998. A section 6(7) offence has a maximum punishment of six months imprisonment or level five on the standard scale.

The commission was set up after the large-scale civil strife that followed the Drumcree conflict over an Orange Order parade in Portadown. It has come under strong criticism from the Order. The Grand Lodge of the Order has a policy of non-engagement with the commission, although some private and district lodges, particularly those with contentious parades, have agreed to talk to it.

== Legislation ==
Public Processions (Northern Ireland) Act 1998 (Note: Section 19(1).)
- Act of Parliament
- Parliament of the United Kingdom
- Long title: An Act to amend the law relating to public processions in Northern Ireland; to provide for the establishment and functions of the Parades Commission for Northern Ireland; and for connected purposes.
- Citation: 1998 c. 2
- Territorial extent: Northern Ireland (Note: Section 19(5).)

Dates
- Royal assent: 16 February 1998
- Commencement: 2 March 1998 (Note: Section 19(2)–(4). The Public Processions (Northern Ireland) Act 1998 (Commencement) Order 1998.)
Other legislation
Amends	House of Commons Disqualification Act 1975

Status: Amended

Text of statute as originally enacted

Revised text of statute as amended

The commission acts under the Public Processions (Northern Ireland) Act 1998 (c. 2). The purpose of the legislation was to remove Secretaries of State of Northern Ireland from the process of deciding whether a parade should go ahead.

The 1998 act was amended by the Public Processions (Amendment) (Northern Ireland) Order 2005. The 2005 order amended the 1998 act to include supporters of parades and rather than just participants and organisers of parades. The 2005 order also amended the 1998 act to give the commission authority over parades-related protests.

== Controversies ==
=== 2026 Garvaghy Road dispute ===
On 25 September 2026, the Parades Commission authorised the Orange Order's request to march down Garvaghy Road, a street with a predominantly nationalist population. The decision was highly controversial, with locals' request to bring about an injunction denied in the early hours of 27 September.

Hundreds of protesters and politicians, including First Minister Michelle O'Neill, blocked the street, preventing the march from going ahead. The Commission's decision to approve the protest faced questioning from Nationalist politicians, with Matthew O'Toole describing it as "inexplicable".

== Commissioners ==
As of September 2026, the commissioners are:

- Professor Evelyn Collins (chair)
- Derek Wilson
- Nicola Rountree
- Pauline Leeson
- Rachel Quigley

A sixth member of the commission, Billy Gamble, resigned in August 2026.

== See also ==
- List of Government departments and agencies in Northern Ireland
