= Quinta de Bellamar =

Building in Matanzas, Cuba

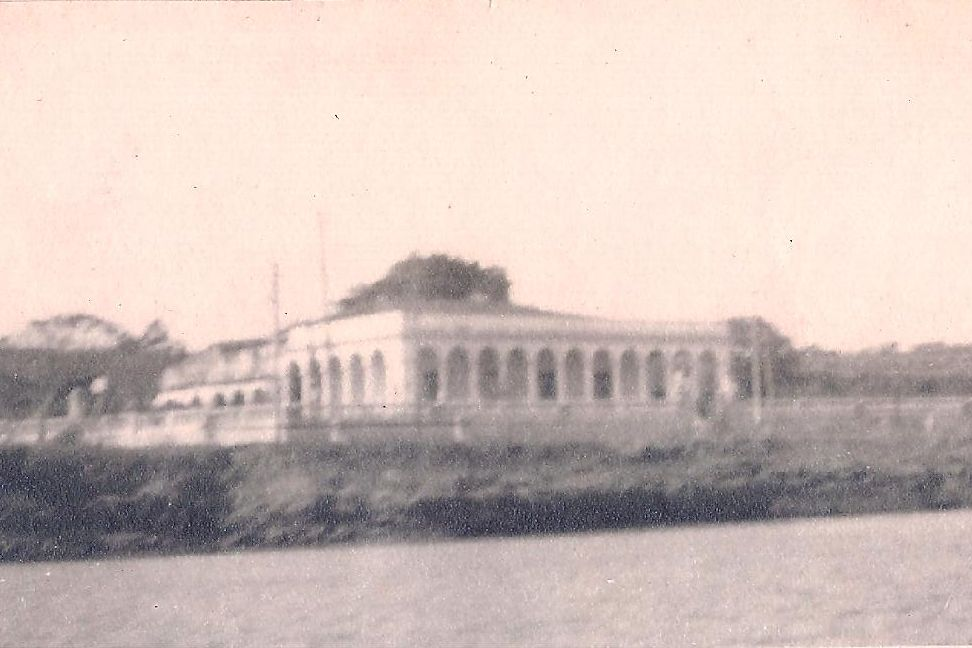
Taken in 1920.

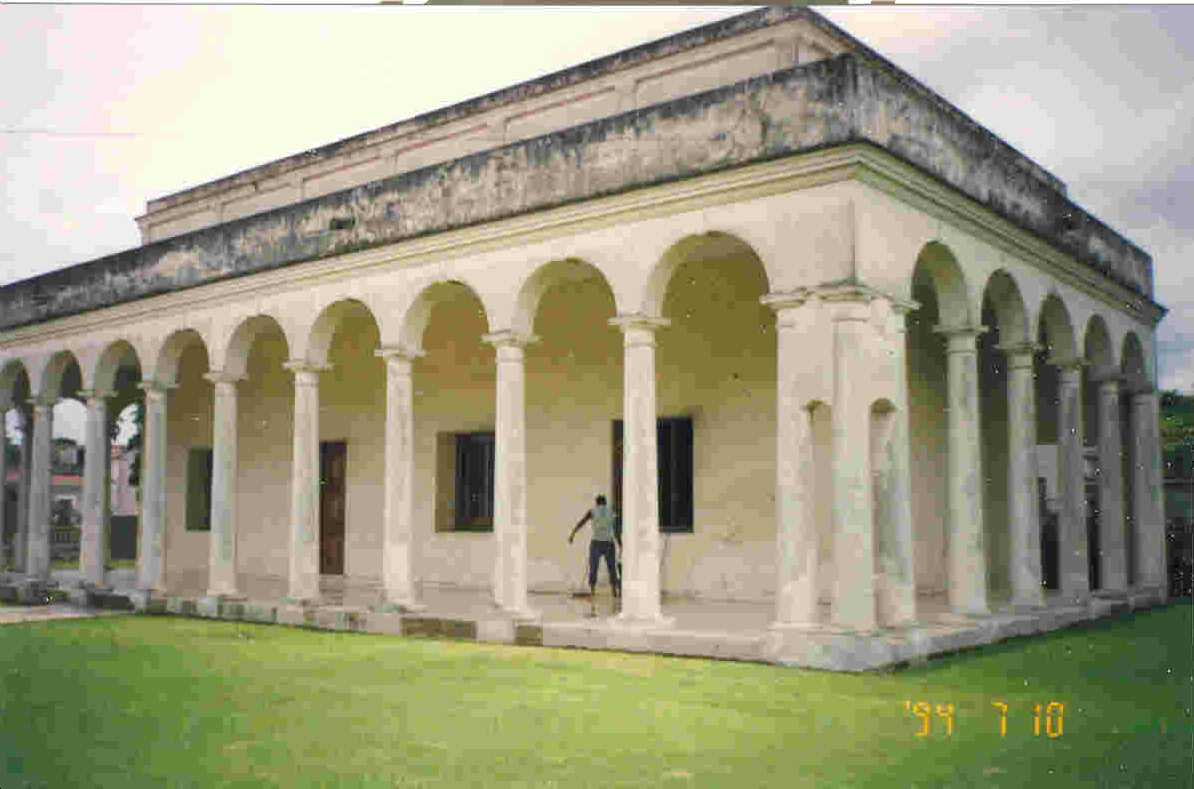
Taken in July 1994.

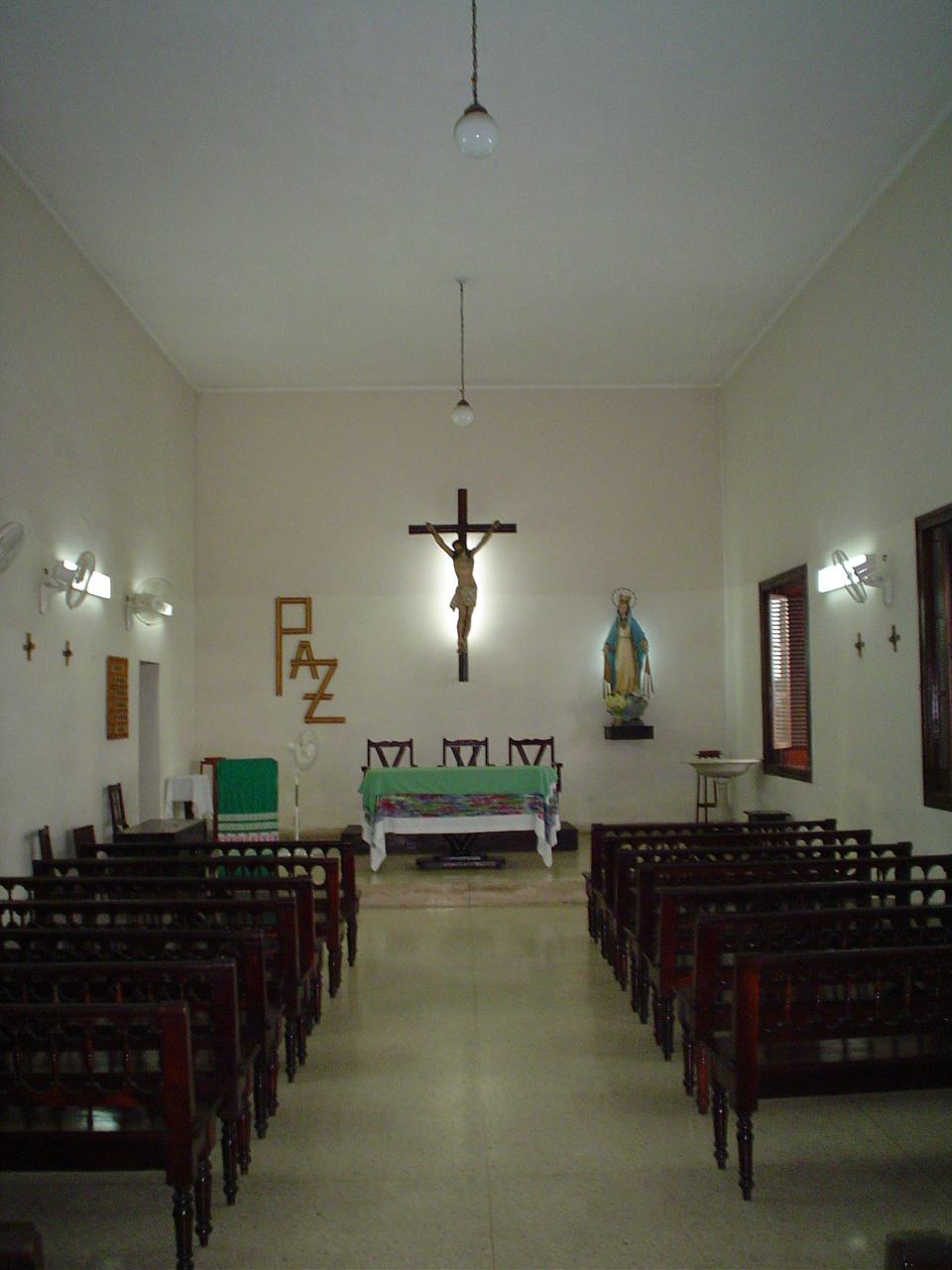
Inside the Church in former living room. Taken in August 2007.

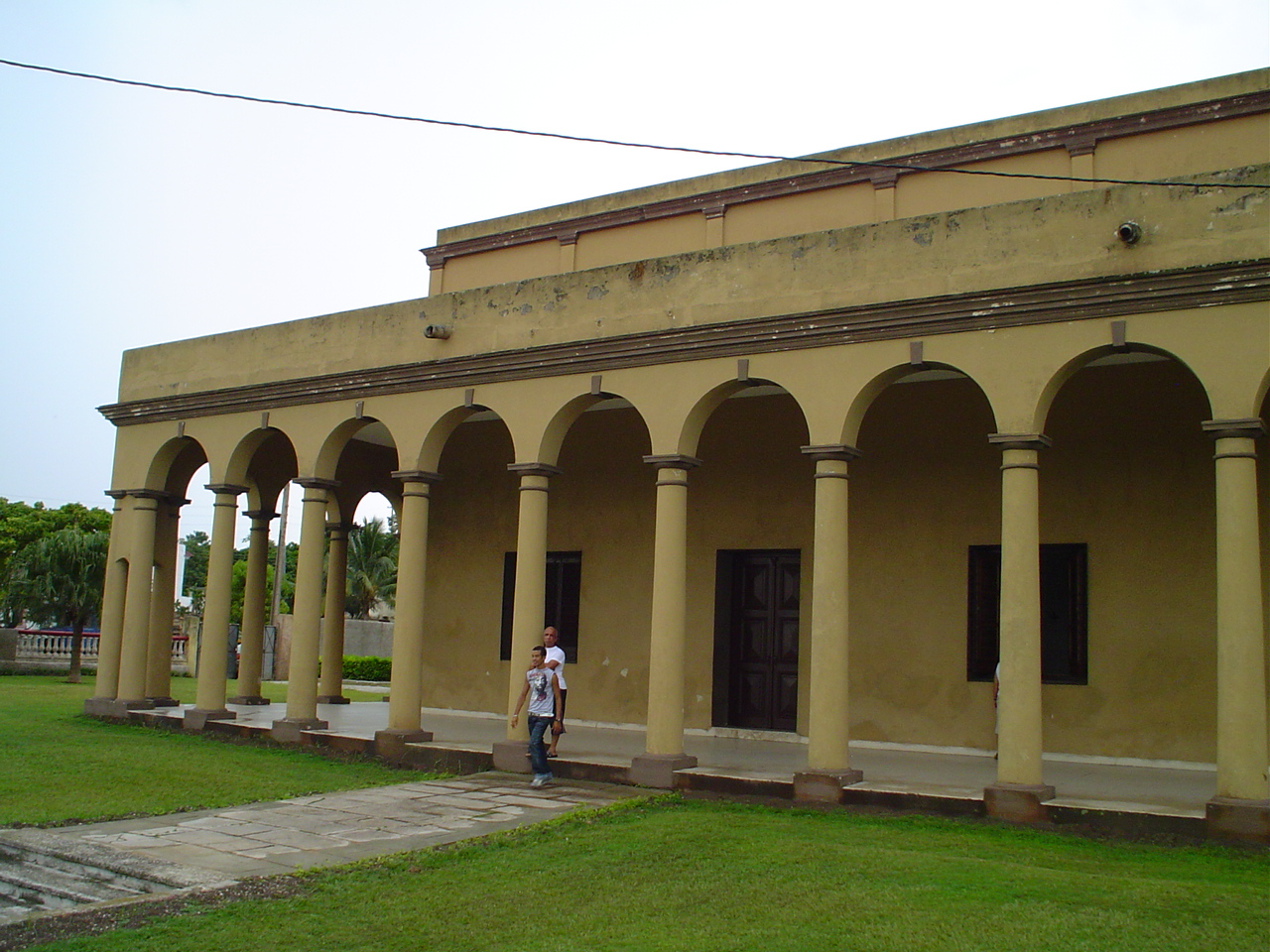
Taken in August 2007.

La Quinta de Bellamar (The Villa of Bellamar) was the one of largest homes in Matanzas. It is located on the Bay of Matanzas in Cuba. It was located on the Via Blanca in the neighborhood of Bellamar outside of the City of Matanzas.

The house was built in the 18th century and was purchased by the Tamargo family (Miguel Luis Tamargo-Bautista) at the turn of the 20th century and used as their summer home. In 1956, the Tamargo family sold the house to the Catholic Church and most of the house was torn down. The only part that remains of the original house is its front facade and the living room which is now the actual church. The Quinta is so large that it can be seen from across the bay.

It is now known as the Iglesia La Milagrosa of the Diocese of Matanzas. It is located at: Calle 129 # 22602, Esquina 226, Reparto La Playa, Matanzas, Cuba.
