= Matanzas =

Municipality in Cuba

Matanzas San Carlos y San Severino de Matanzas
- Municipality
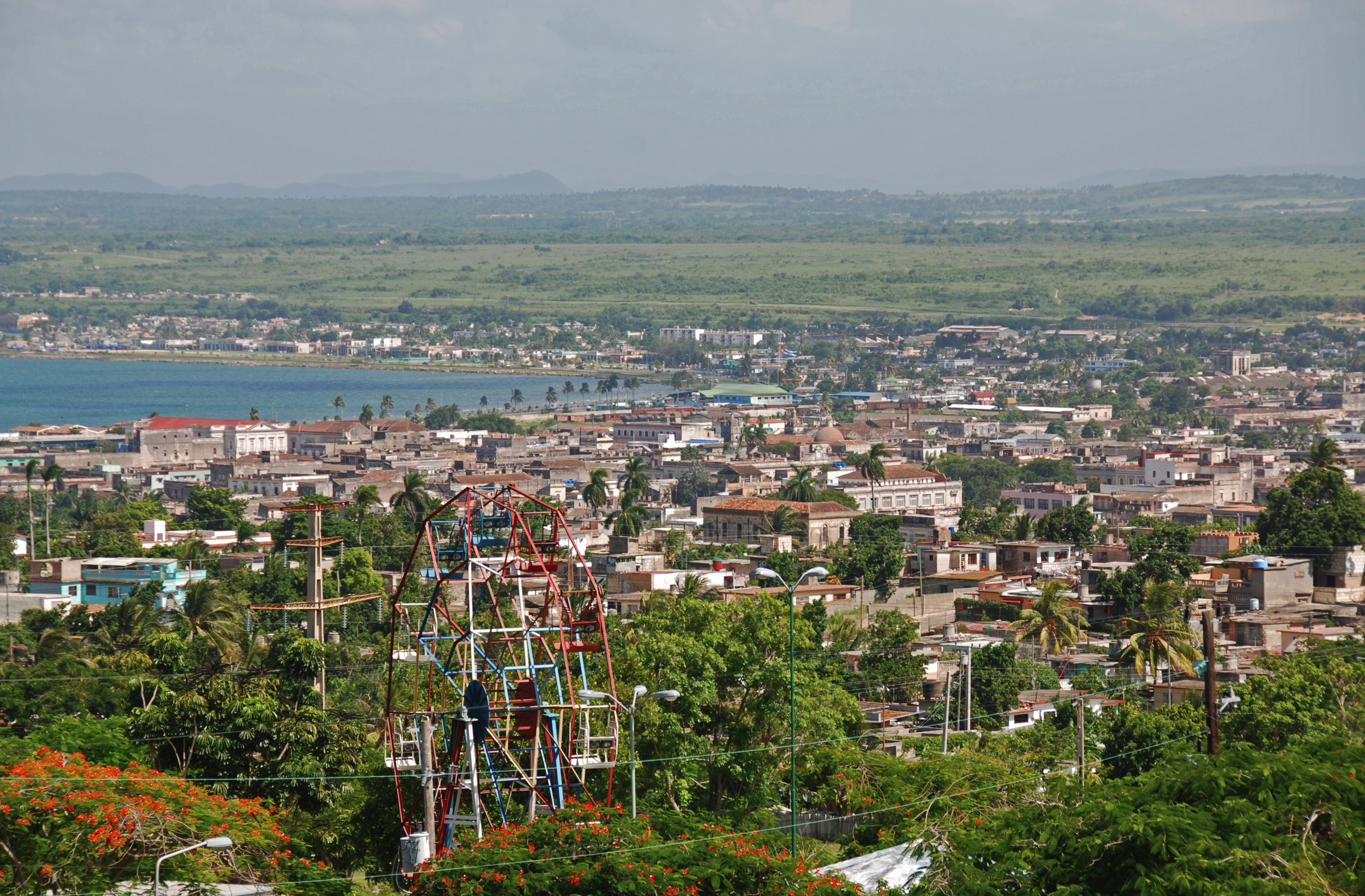
- The city and bay of Matanzas

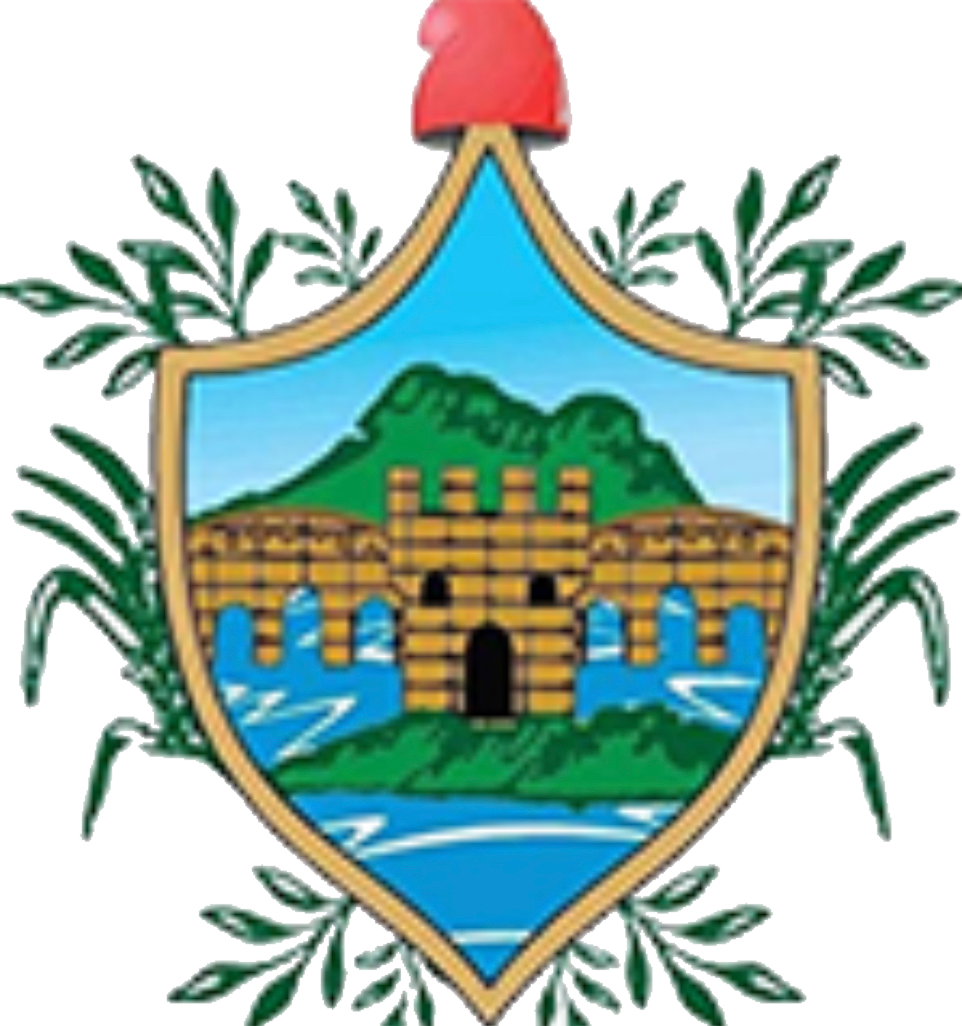
- Seal
- Nicknames: La Atenas de Cuba; Venice of Cuba; City of Bridges
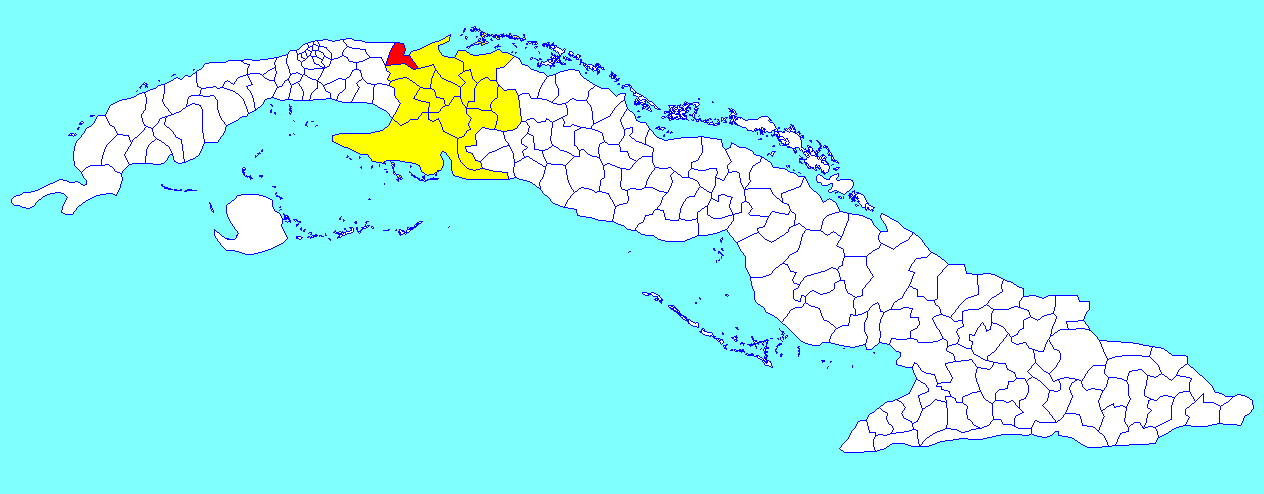
- Matanzas municipality (red) within Matanzas Province (yellow) and Cuba
- Coordinates: 23°03′4″N 81°34′31″W
- Country: Cuba
- Province: Matanzas
- Settled: 1572
- Founded: 1693
- Established: 1695

Area
  - Municipality: 317 km^{2} (122 sq mi)
- Elevation: 20 m (66 ft)

Population (2022)
  - Municipality: 163,631
  - Density: 516/km^{2} (1,340/sq mi)
  - Urban: 151,555
  - Rural: 12,076
- Demonym: Matancero/a
- Time zone: UTC-5 (EST)
- Postal code: 40100
- Area code: +53 52

Matanzas (Latin American Spanish: [maˈtansas]; Lucumi: Ayá Áta) is the capital of the Cuban province of Matanzas. Known for its poets, culture, and Afro-Cuban folklore, it is located on the northern shore of the island of Cuba, on the Bay of Matanzas (Spanish Bahia de Matanzas), 102 kilometres (63 mi) east of the capital Havana and 32 kilometres (20 mi) west of the resort town of Varadero.

Matanzas is called the City of Bridges, for the seventeen bridges that cross the three rivers that traverse the city (Rio Yumuri, San Juan, and Canimar). For this reason it was referred to as the "Venice of Cuba." It was also called "La Atenas de Cuba" ("The Athens of Cuba") for its poets.

Matanzas is known as the birthplace of the music and dance traditions danzón and rumba.

== History ==
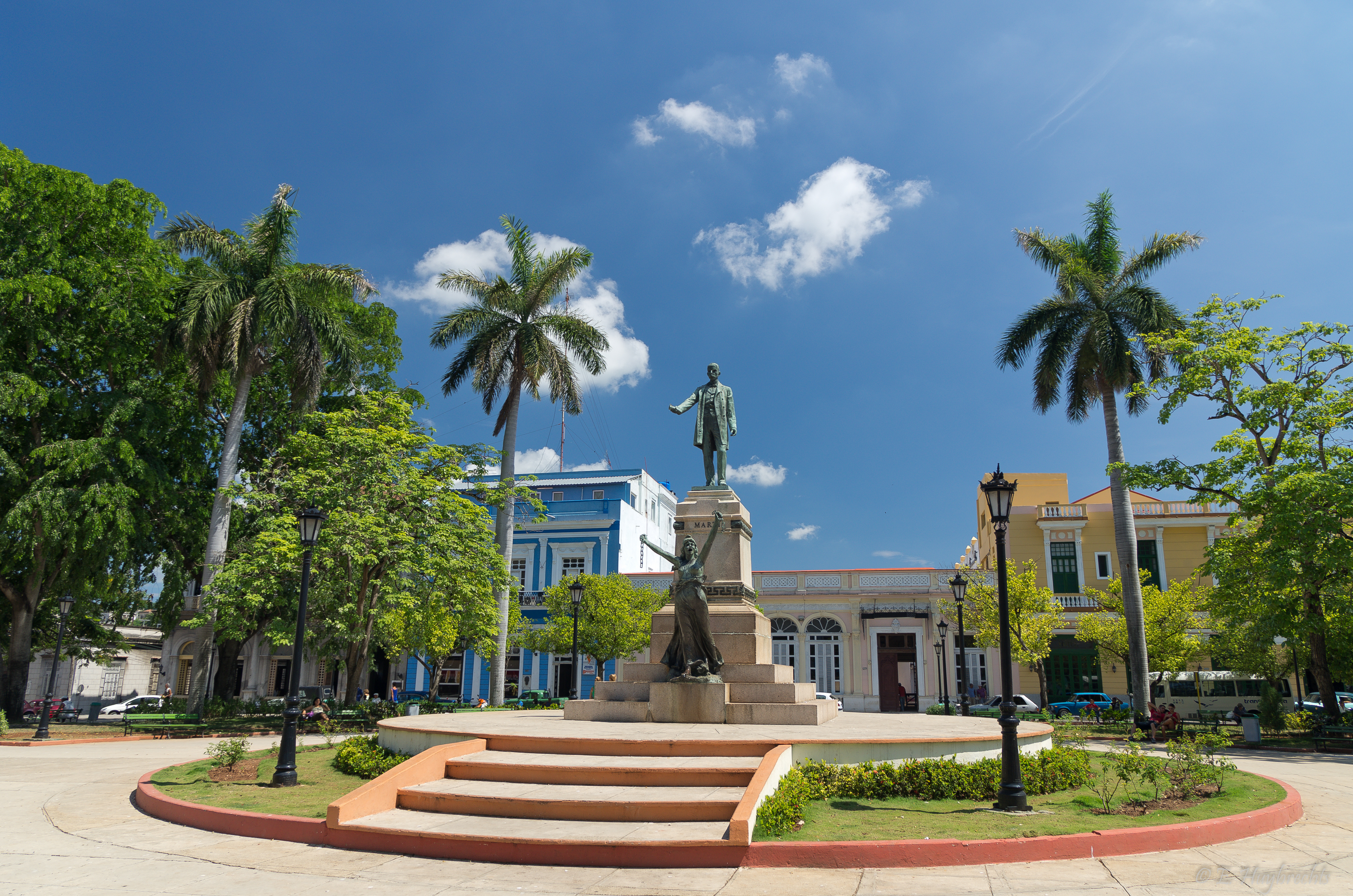
Libertad Square in Matanzas city

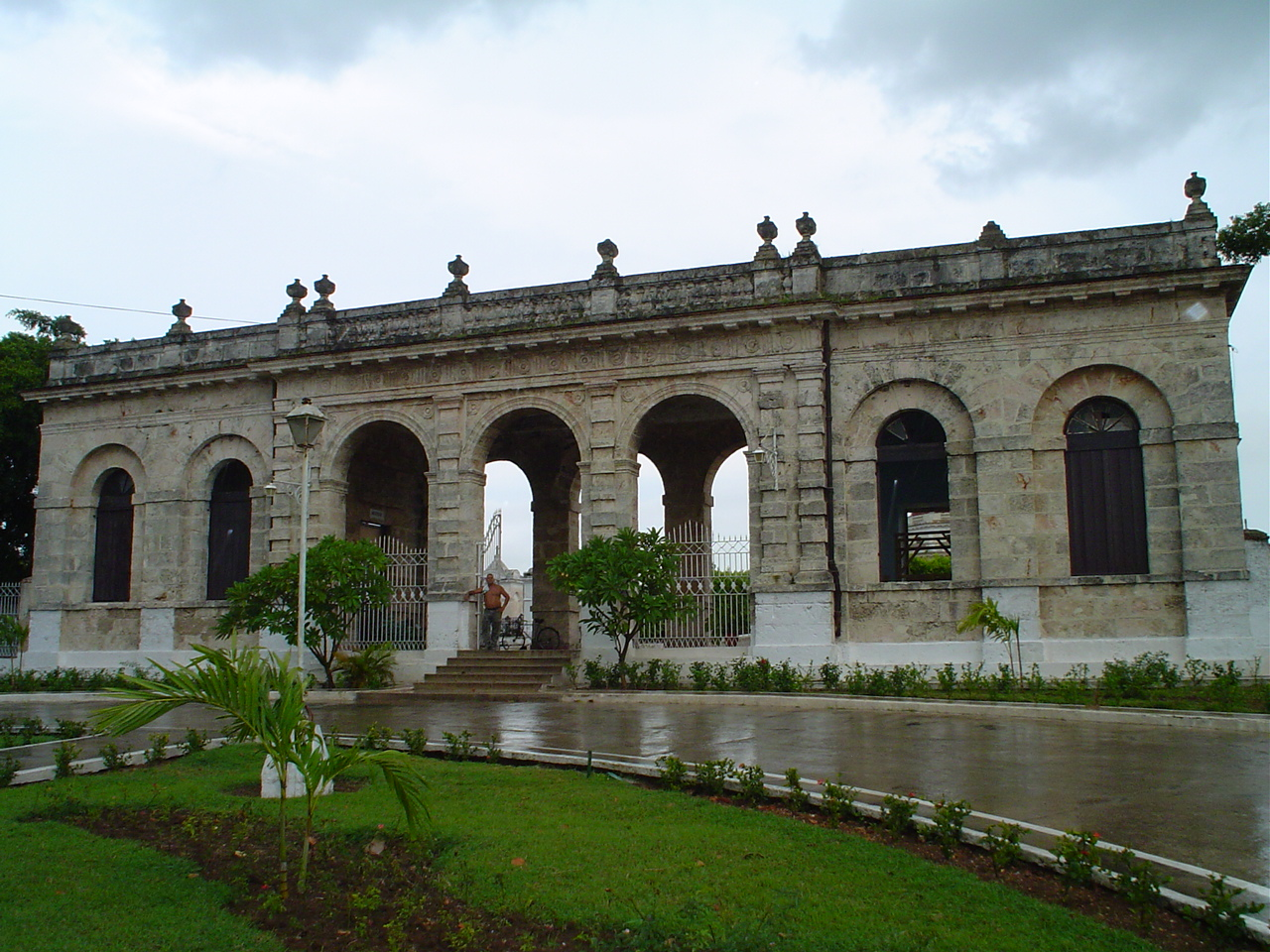
Necropolis de San Carlos Borromeo

Matanzas was founded on October 12, 1693, as San Carlos y San Severino de Matanzas. This followed a royal decree ("real cédula") issued on September 25, 1690, which decreed that the bay and port of Matanzas be settled by 30 families from the Canary Islands.

Matanzas was one of the regions that saw intensive development of sugar plantations during the colonial era. Consequently, many African slaves were imported to support the sugar industry, particularly during the first half of the nineteenth century. For example, in 1792 there were 1900 slaves in Matanzas, roughly 30% of its population. In 1817, the slave population of Matanzas had grown to 10,773, comprising nearly 50% of the overall population. By 1841, 53,331 slaves made up 62.7% of the population of Matanzas. Census figures for 1859 put the Matanzas slave population at 104,519. Matanzas was the site of several slave insurrections and plots, including the infamous Escalera conspiracy_{(es)} (discovered in late 1843, see also Year of the Lash). Due to the high number of both slaves and, importantly, free Afro-Cubans in Matanzas, the retention of African traditions is especially strong there. In 1898, Matanzas became the location of the first action in the Spanish–American War. The city was bombarded by American Navy vessels on 25 April 1898, just after the beginning of the war.

=== Name origin ===
The name Matanzas means "massacre" and refers to a putative slaughter in 1510 at the port of the same name, in which 30 Spanish soldiers tried to cross one of the rivers to attack an aboriginal camp on the far shore. The Spanish soldiers had no boats, so they enlisted the help of native fishermen. However, once they reached the middle of the river, the fishermen flipped the boats, and due to the Spanish soldiers' heavy metal armor, most of them drowned. Only two women—one said to be the beautiful María de Estrada—survived, the result of being taken by a Cacique. De Estrada is said to have later escaped the "power of the Cacique" and married Pedro Sánchez Farfán in the city of Trinidad. According to municipal historian Arnaldo Jimenez de la Cal, "[i]t was the first act of rebellion of natives in Cuba."

== Geography ==
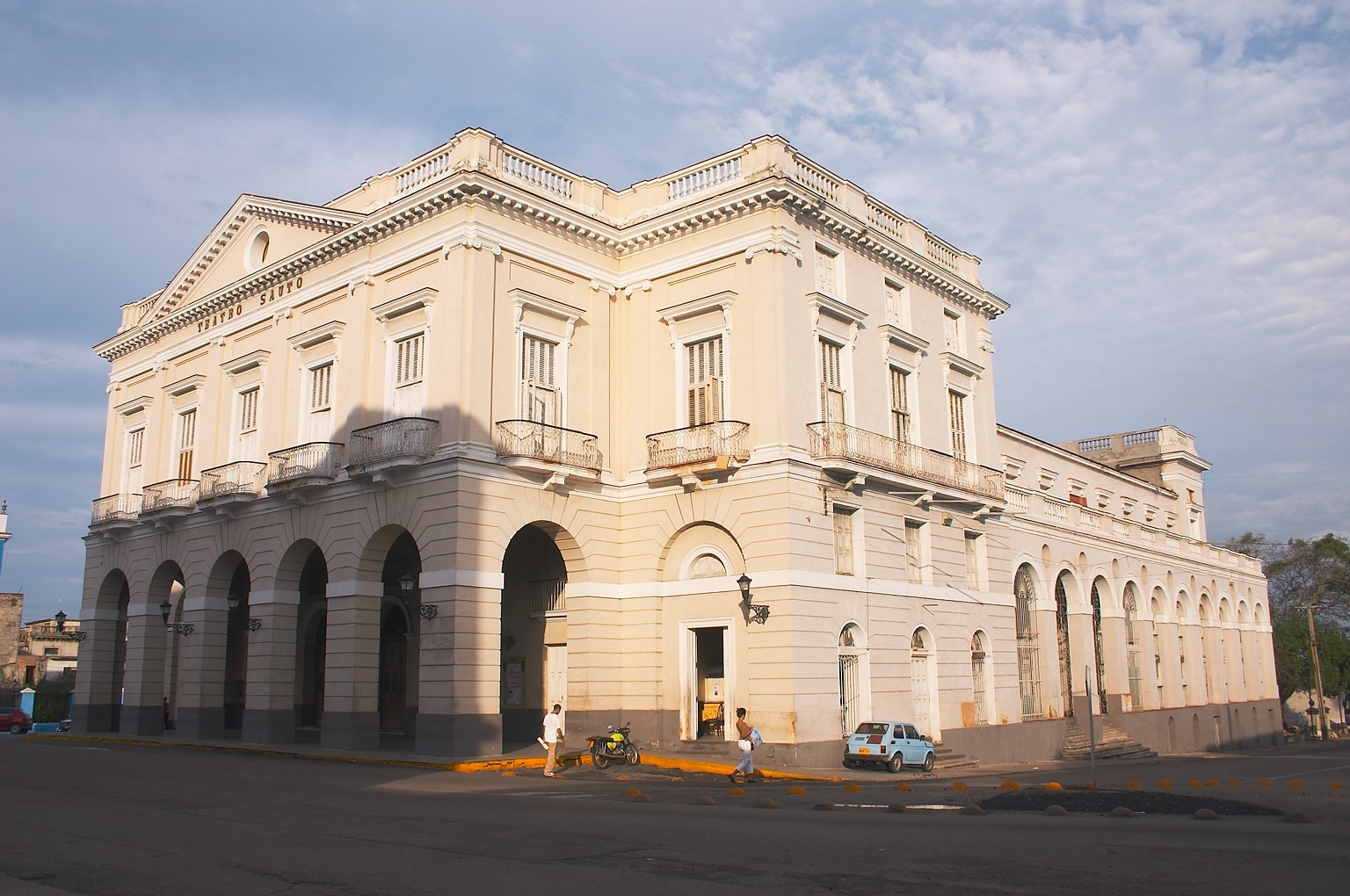
Sauto Theater

The city is located on the north shore of the island of Cuba, on all three sides of the Bay of Matanzas. The bay cuts deep in the island, and three rivers flow in the bay inside city limits (Rio Yumuri, San Juan, and Canimar). To the south-east, the landscape rises into a hill called Pan de Matanzas, divided from the Atlantic coast by the Yumuri Valley and a coastal ridge.

The city of Matanzas is divided into four neighborhoods: Versalles, Matanzas, Playa and Pueblo Nuevo. The municipality is divided into the barrios of Bachicha, Bailén, Barracones, Bellamar, Camarioca, Cárcel, Ceiba Mocha, Colón, Corral Nuevo, Guanábana, Ojo de Agua, Refugio, San Luis, San Severino, Simpson y Monserrate, Versalles and Yumurí.

== Demographics ==
In 2022, the municipality of Matanzas had a population of 163,631. With a total area of 317 km^{2} (122 sq mi), it has a population density of 520/km^{2} (1,300/sq mi).

== Transportation ==
=== Air ===
Matanzas is served by Juan Gualberto Gómez Airport, 15 km east of the city.

=== Rail ===
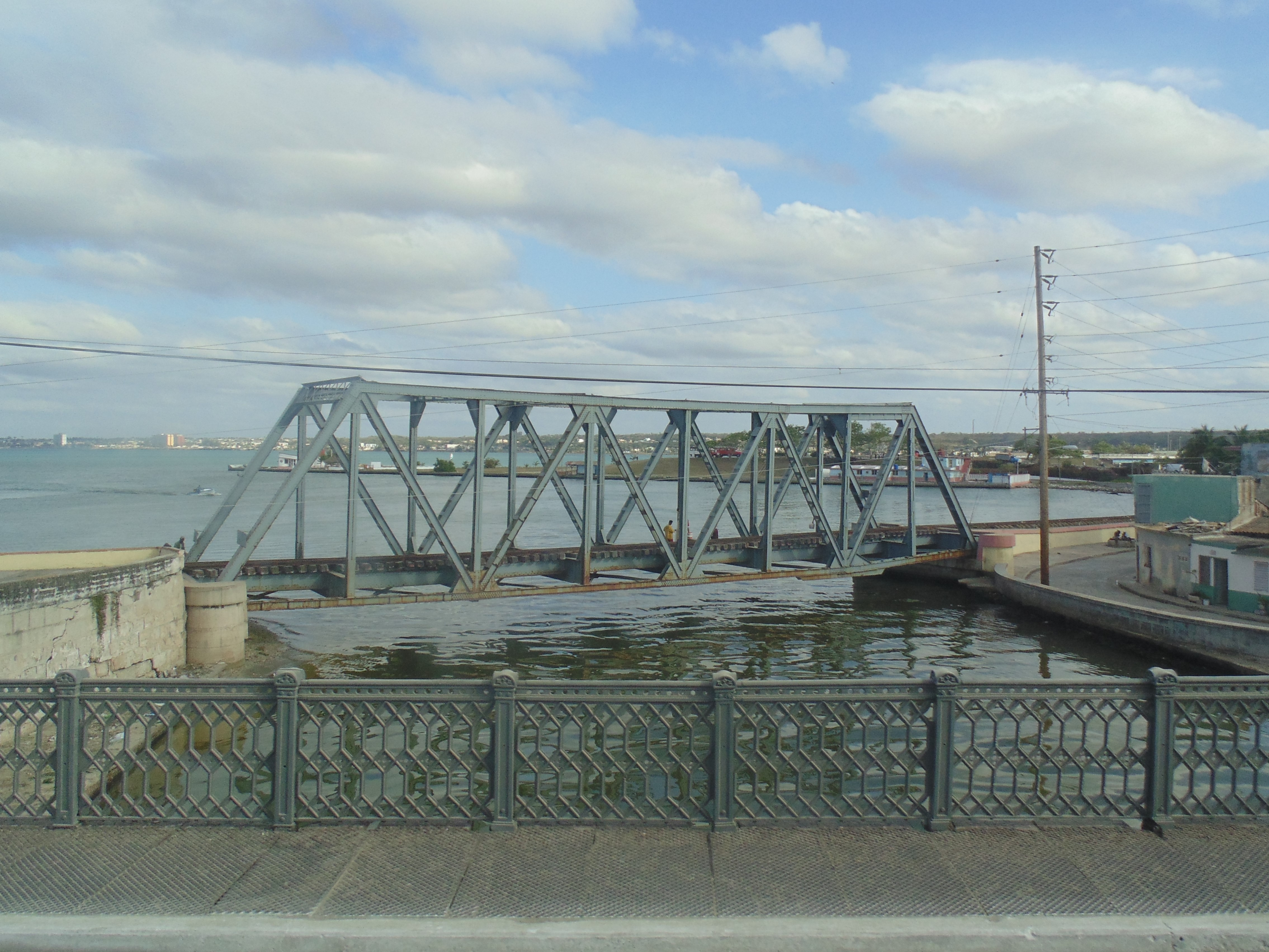
Rail bridge crossing the Yumuri River

The city has two railway stations. The main station is on the main line from Havana to Santiago de Cuba. The electrified Hershey train operates by a different route to Havana from a separate station in the barrio of Versalles.

=== Buses ===
Matanzas is also served by Viazul and Astro buses.

=== Tramway ===
After two failed attempts Matanzas had a tramway in 1916 (initially as Ferrocarril Eléctrico de Matanzas, then as city owned Compañía de Servicios Públicos de Matanzas in 1918 and Compañía de Tranvías de Matanzas in 1926). In 1952 it acquired tramcars from Havana Electric Railway, but converted with buses by new owners Omnibus Urbanos SA in 1954.

=== Roads ===
The Via Blanca highway connects the city with both Havana in the west and Varadero in the east.

== Education ==
The University of Matanzas is the province's high learning education institution.

== Attractions ==
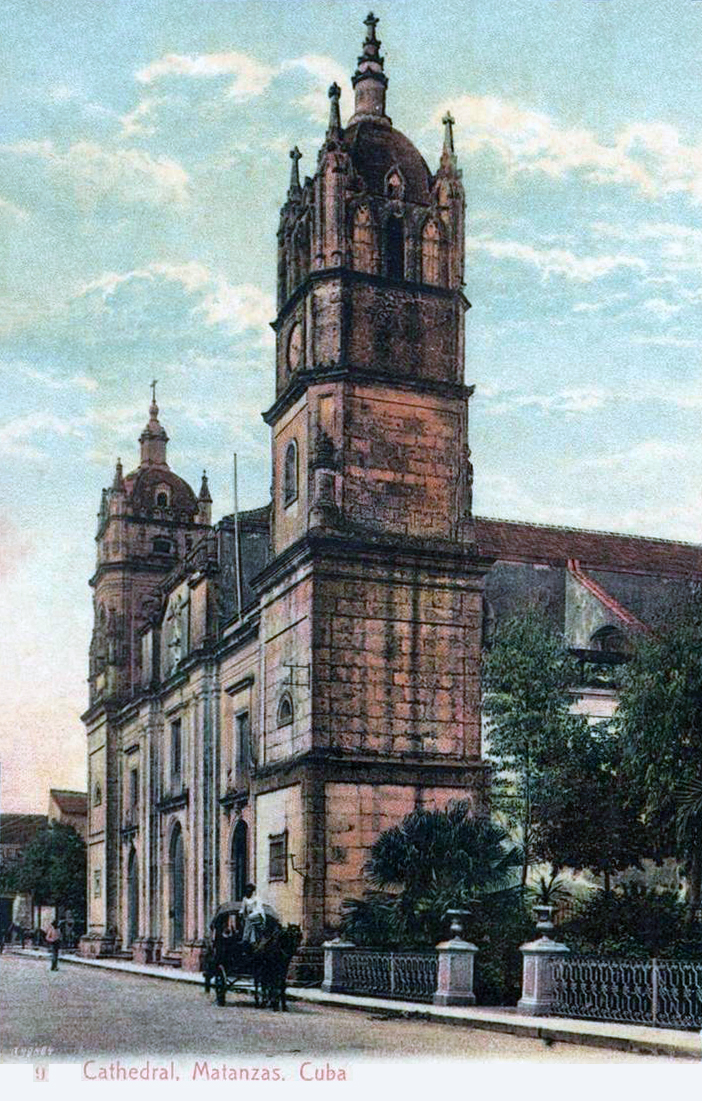
San Carlos Cathedral of Matanzas, in a postcard of 1908

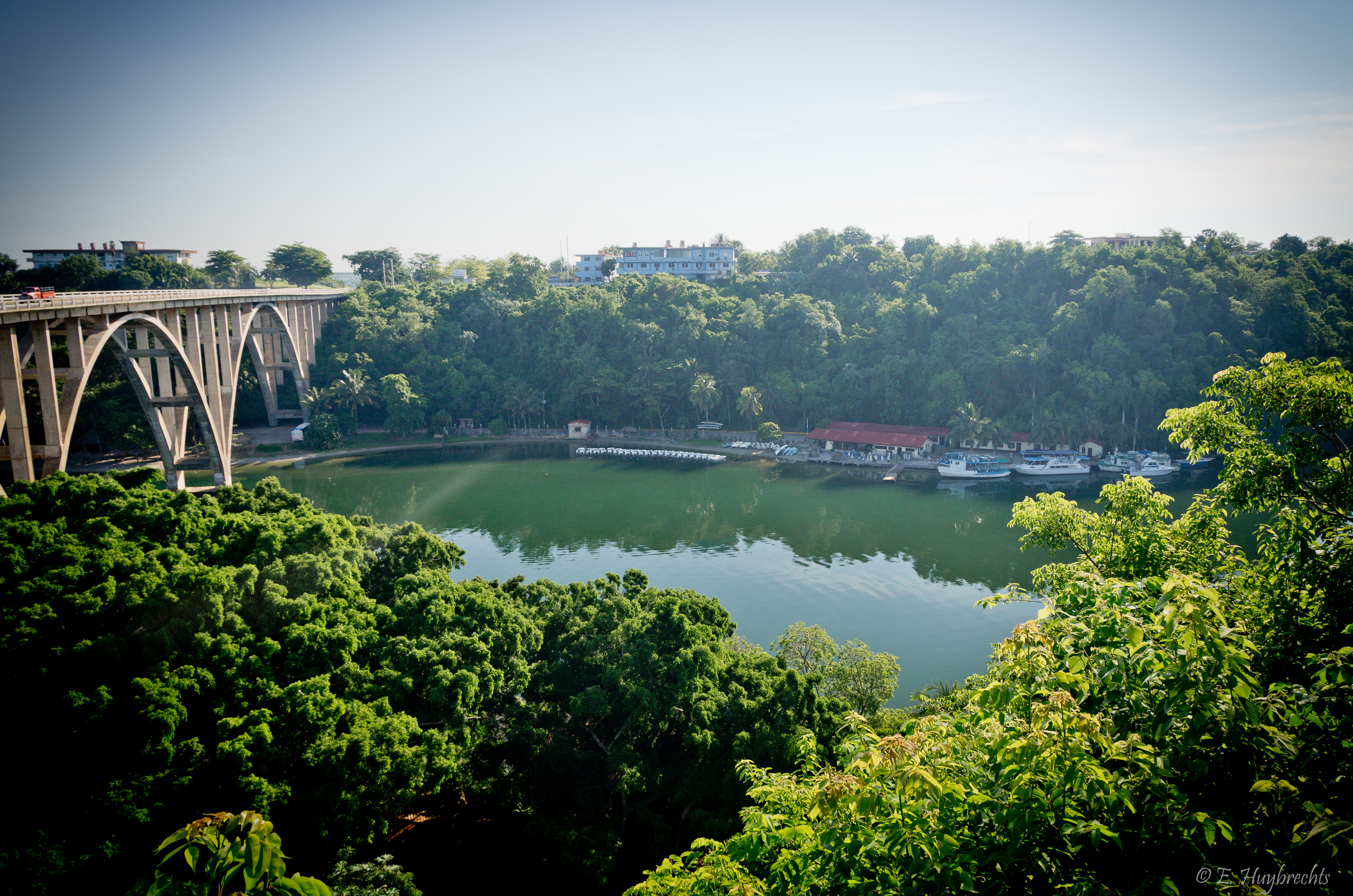
Canimar bridge, over Canimar river in Matanzas

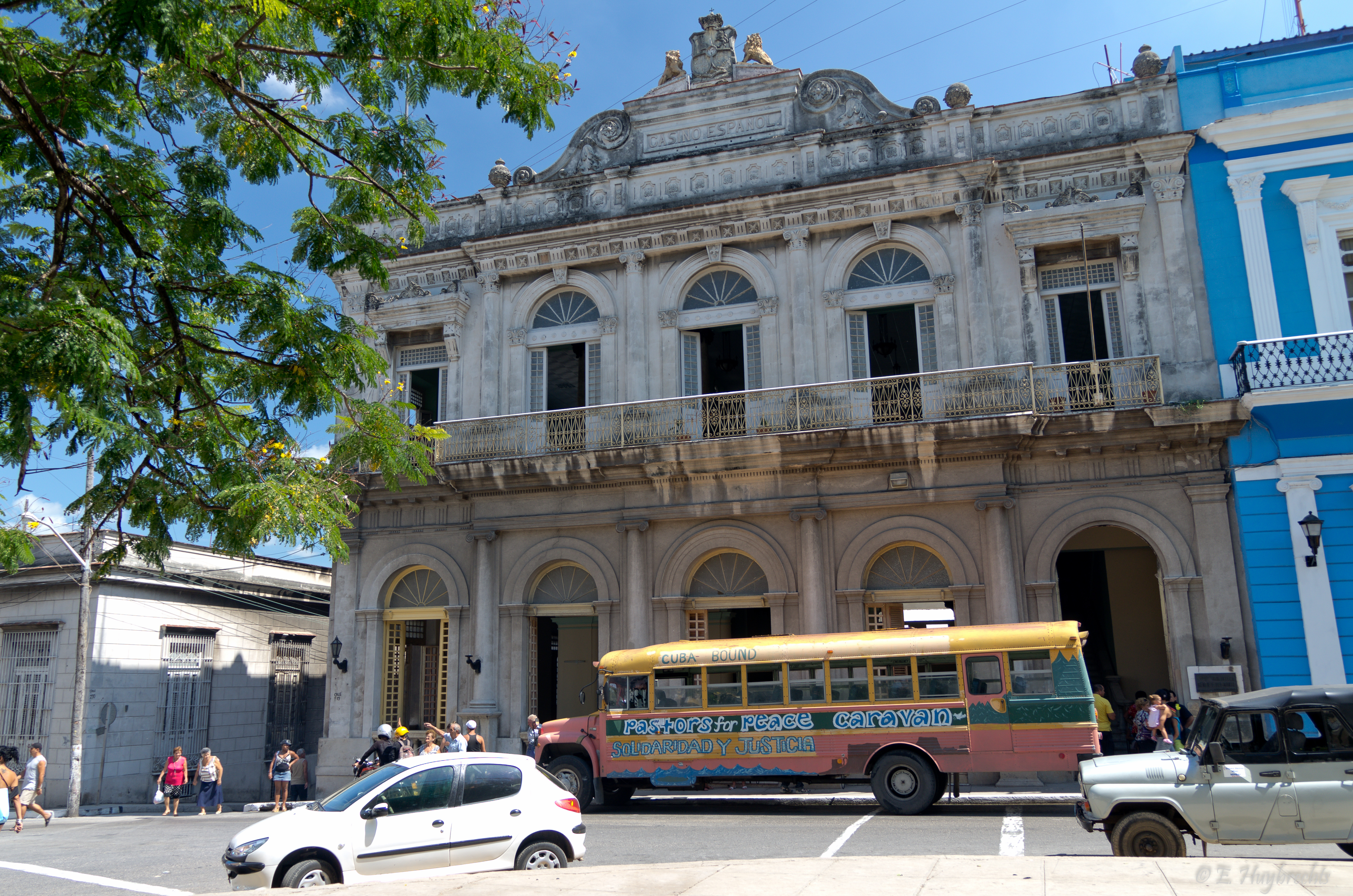
Matanza's Spanish Casino

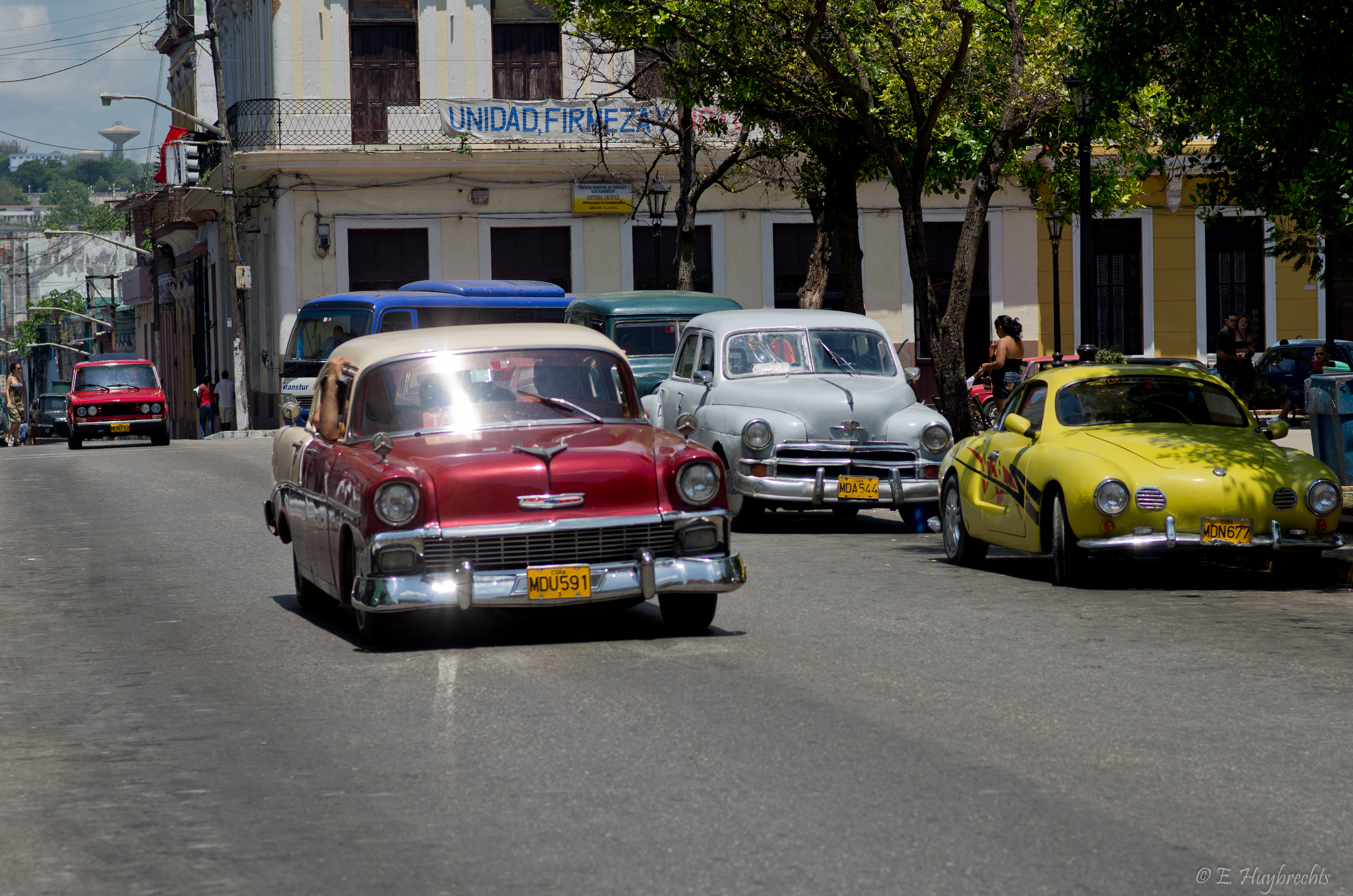
Vintage cars cruising a plaza in Matanzas

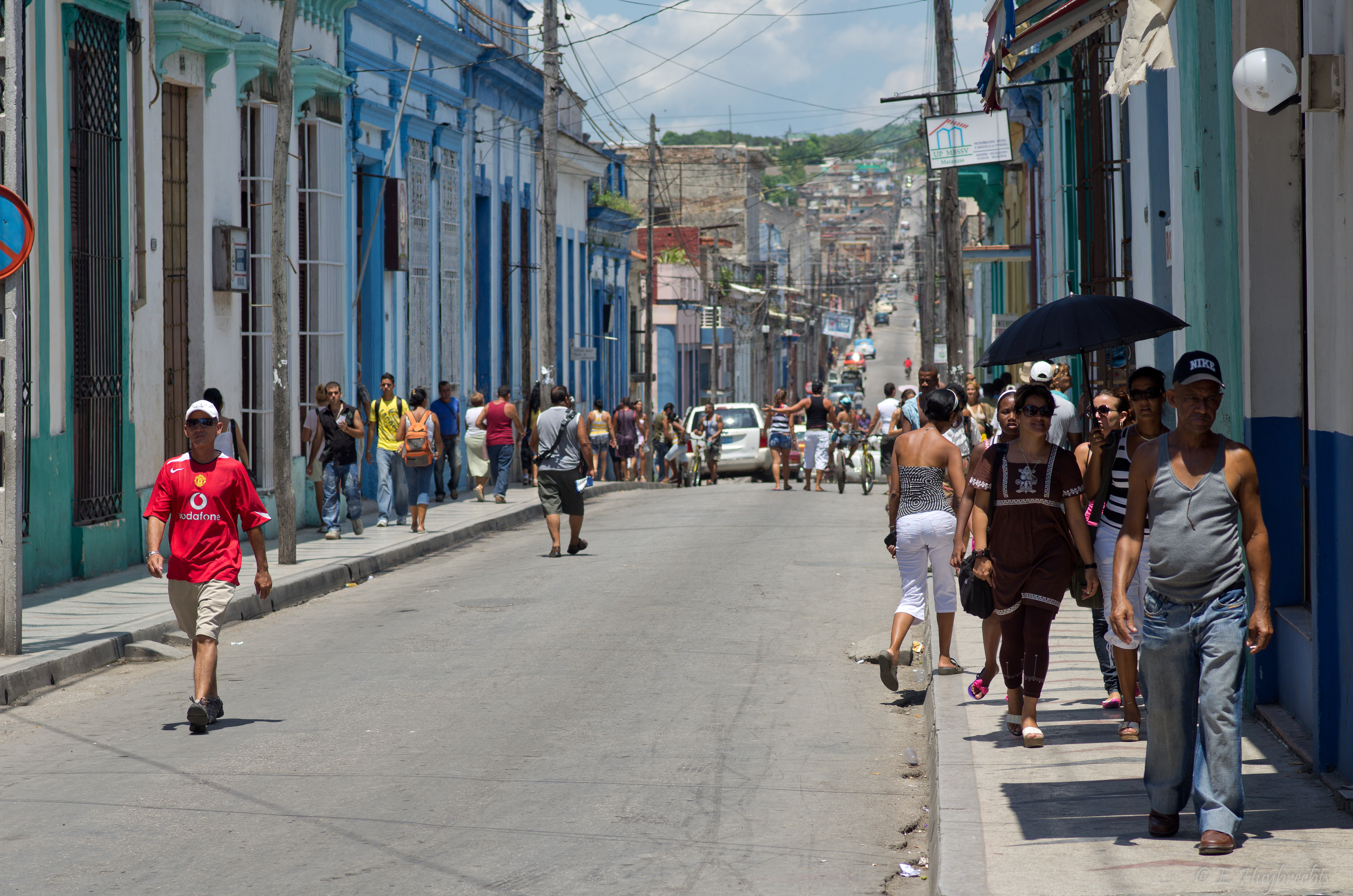
Street scene in Matanzas

- Pharmaceutical Museum - established in 1882
- Museo Historico Provincial de Matanzas - Provincial History Museum
- El Consejo Provincial de Artes Visuales at the Galería Pedro Esquerré, shows exhibitions of contemporary art.
- Sauto Theater - Teatro Sauto - Opened in 1863, the theatre hosts plays, opera, ballet, and symphonic concerts. It is a National Monument of Cuba.
- Catedral San Carlos De Borromeo
- Nearby Bellamar caves, also a National Monument of Cuba.
- Boating on the Canimar River
- Matanzas bridges
- Casino Español - Now being restored (May 2008).
- Matanzas High School (Palm Coast)
- Necropolis de San Carlos Borromeo
- Quinta de Bellamar, heritage house and church

=== Monuments ===
The Aqueduct of Matanzas, today a national monument, was built in 1870 and is still providing the city with water from the spring Manantial de Bello. An ingenious construction built 1912 exploited and till 1912 by Fernando Heydrich and Company.

== Notable people ==
- Eufemio Abreu - Former Major League Baseball player
- Bernardo Benes - exiled Cuban born lawyer, banker and civic leader in Miami
- Maria Magdalena Campos-Pons - Afro-Cuban Artist-photography, performance, audiovisual media, and sculpture, born in Matanzas in 1959
- José Cardenal - Former Major League Baseball player
- Leo Cárdenas - Former Major League Baseball player and 5-time All-Star was born in Matanzas in 1938
- Rafael Cruz - Born in Matanzas in 1939; Evangelistic preacher and father of U.S. Senator Ted Cruz
- Martin Fox, gambling operator and owner of the Tropicana Club.
- Guillermo Heredia - Major League Baseball player
- Felipe de Jesús Estévez - Bishop of the Diocese of Saint Augustine
- William R. King - 13th Vice President of the United States, was sworn into office near Matanzas in 1853
- Carlos Lamar - Olympic fencer was born in Matanzas in 1908
- Héctor Lombard - Mixed martial artist, born in Matanzas in 1978
- Sonora Matancera - is a Cuban/Afro-Cuban band
- Joseph Marion Hernández (1788 – 1857), Floridano who served as the first delegate from the Florida Territory. He was also the first Hispanic American to serve in the United States Congress and a member of the Whig Party (1822 – 1823)
- Richard Maurice - Film director and union organizer, born in Matanzas in 1893
- Monguito - was a Cuban vocalist, bandleader, producer and composer
- Los Muñequitos de Matanzas - rumba ensemble
- Nestor Pérez - former professional baseball player and the current manager of the Florida Complex League Braves
- Israel Pickens - third governor of the US state of Alabama, died in Matanzas in 1827
- Pérez Prado - Mambo bandleader and composer was born in Matanzas.
- Rafael Soriano - painter who was part of the third generation of Vanguard Artists
- Javier Sotomayor - High Jump current World Record Holder, 8'1/2" in 1993, and Olympic Champion, Barcelona, Spain, 1992.
- Anne Kingsbury Wollstonecraft - botanist, naturalist, botanical illustrator, and women's rights advocate, lived in Matanzas in the 1820s.
- Joseph White - Franco-Afro-Cuban violin virtuoso was born in Matanzas on New Year's Eve 1835 (He died in Paris in 1918)

== See also ==
- List of cities in Cuba
