= Anne Henderson (public servant) =

Chair of the Parades Commission of Northern Ireland

Anne Isobel Henderson OBE is chair of the Parades Commission of Northern Ireland. She was born in Ballymena, but has lived most of her life in Belfast. She is married to Charles Henderson, and they have three children. She was trained as an accountant, and served previously as Vice Chair of the Northern Ireland Housing Executive from 2004 to 2012. She is a member of the audit committee of Queen's University Belfast.

Henderson was appointed Officer of the Order of the British Empire (OBE) in the 2021 Birthday Honours for public service and services to peacekeeping in Northern Ireland.
