= Frist Art Museum =

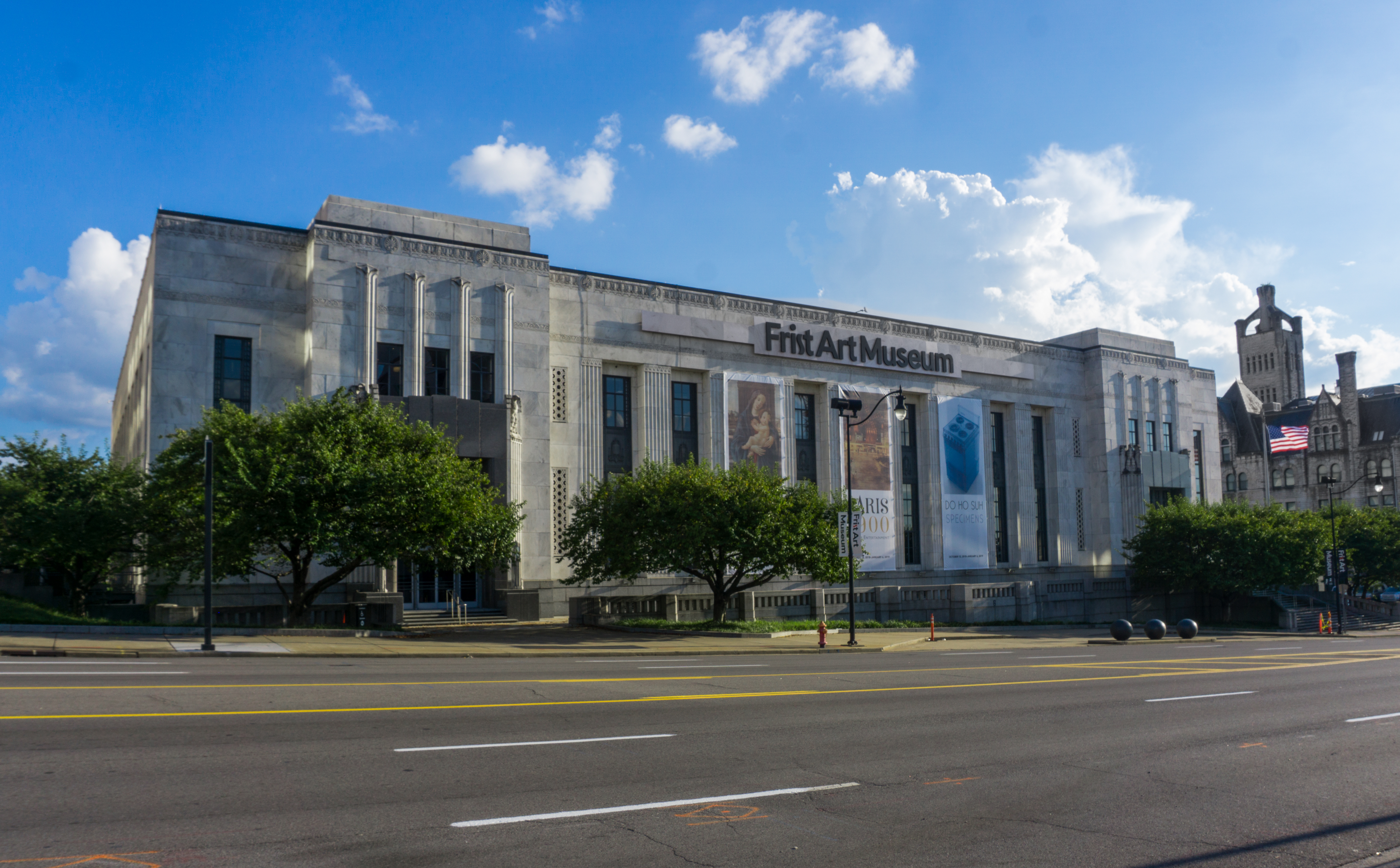
- Nashville's Art Deco-style Frist Art Museum
- Established: 2001
- Location: 919 Broadway; Nashville, TN 37203 (United States)
- Type: Art Center, Art museum
- Visitors: 200,000
- Directors: Seth Feman, PhD
- Website: www.fristartmuseum.org
- US Post Office
- U.S. National Register of Historic Places
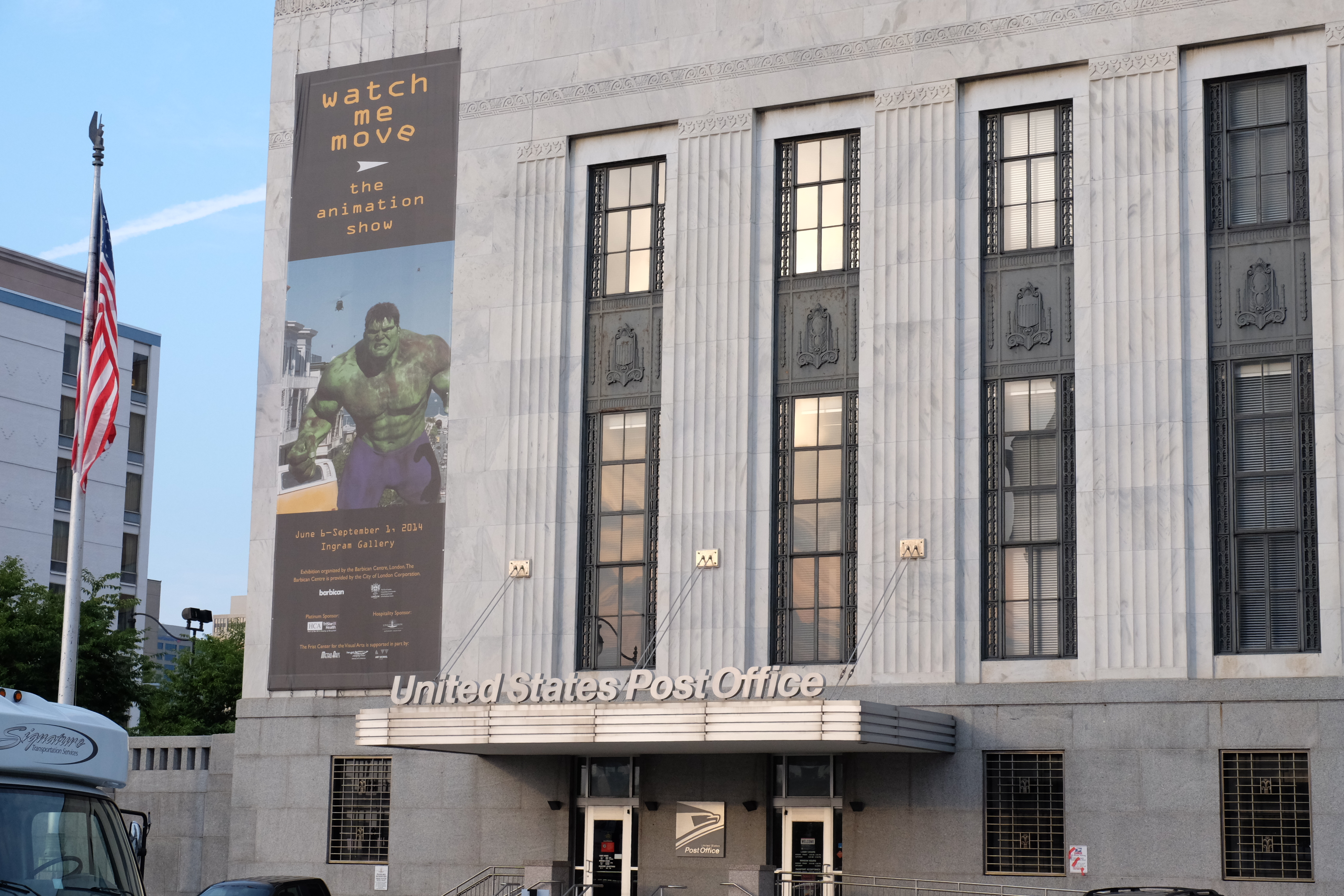
- Section still used as post office

- Location within Tennessee Location within the United States
- Location: 901 Broadway, Nashville, Tennessee
- Coordinates: 36°9′28″N 86°47′2″W
- Area: 2.5 acres (1.0 ha)
- Built: 1932
- Architect: Marr & Holman
- Architectural style: Moderne, Art Deco
- MPS: Marr and Holman Buildings in Downtown Nashville TR (AD)
- NRHP reference No.: 84000580
- Added to NRHP: November 15, 1984

The Frist Art Museum, formerly known as the Frist Center for the Visual Arts, is an art exhibition hall in Nashville, Tennessee, housed in the city's historic U.S. Post Office building, which is listed on the National Register of Historic Places.

== History ==
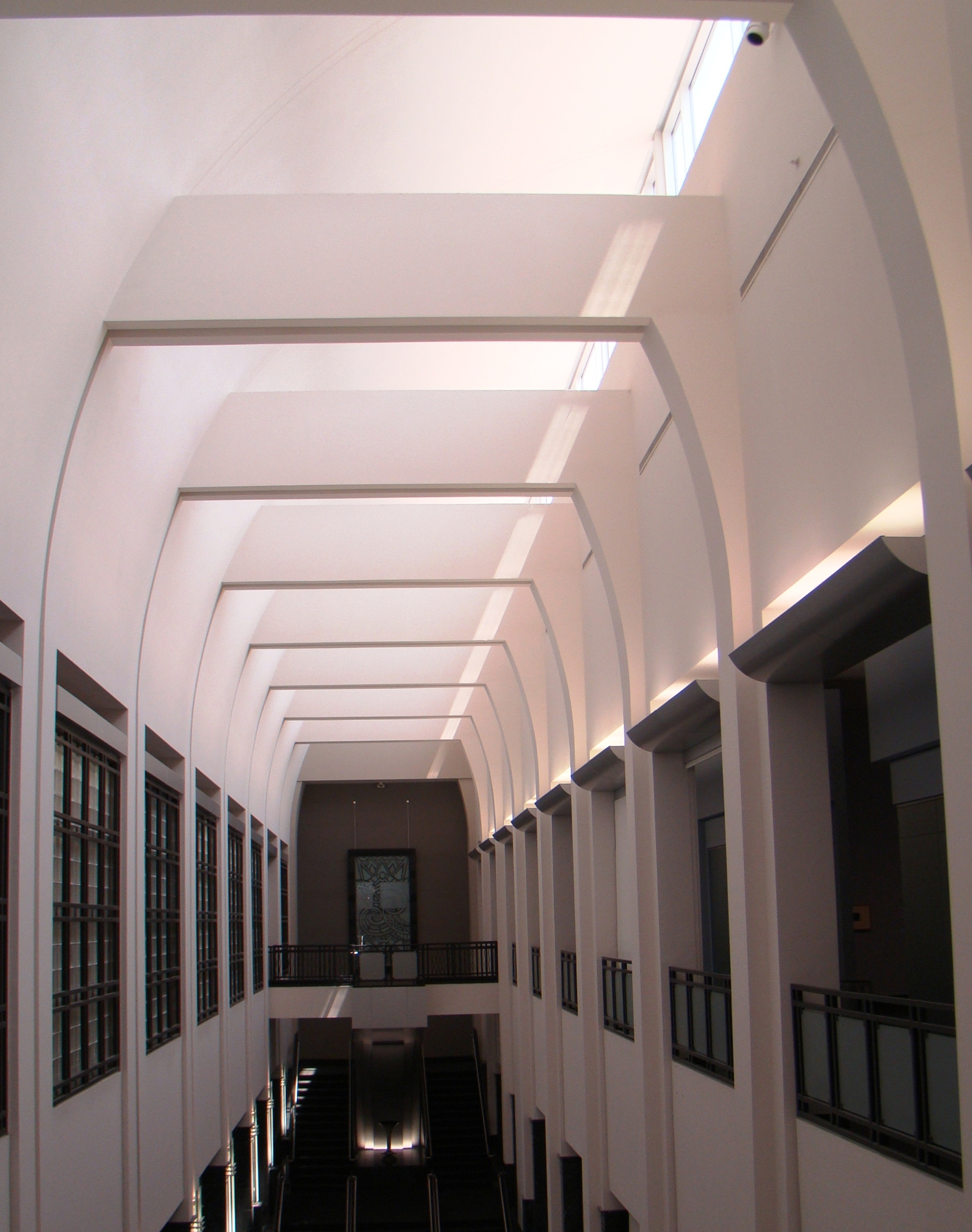
Interior

The museum is housed in a white marble building that was built in the 1930s to serve as Nashville's main post office. Designed by Marr & Holman Architects, it was built in 1933-34 for $1.5 million. Its location near Union Station was convenient for mail distribution, since most mail at that time was moved by train.

By the 1980s, downtown was no longer a good location for postal distribution. When a new main post office was built near the airport in 1986, the historic old facility became a downtown branch using only a small portion of one floor.

In the early 1990s Thomas F. Frist, Jr., and his family, through the charitable Frist Foundation, identified the post office building, an example of Art Deco and Stripped Classicism style, as a good location for a proposed downtown art museum. The Foundation implemented a public-private venture between the foundation, the U.S. Postal Service, and the city of Nashville. In 1999 the City of Nashville acquired the building from the U.S. Postal Service for the purpose of creating the Frist Center for the Visual Arts, paying $4.4 million. The city contributed $15 million toward renovating the building, and the Frist Foundation and Frist family contributed $25 million for the renovation and to start an endowment for the art museum. The city owns the building but granted the Frist a 99-year lease for $1 per year. A renovated post office branch was opened in the basement in 1999.

The art center opened in April 2001 with approximately 24,000 square feet (2,200 m^{2}) of gallery space presenting visual art from local, state and regional artists, as well as major U.S. and international exhibitions.

On April 2, 2018, the Frist announced that it changed its name from The Frist Center of the Visual Arts to The Frist Art Museum. The change became legally effective April 1, 2018.

The post office branch remains open and has its own separate entrance on the western end of the building.

== Exhibition and program information ==
As a non-collecting museum, the Frist does not have a permanent collection; rather, the center focuses on creating exhibitions as well as securing traveling exhibitions from around the country and the world.

Information regarding past, current and future exhibitions is found on the Frist's website. Each exhibition page contains detailed information about exhibition-related programs and an array of resources, including gallery guides, audio guides, videos and additional information from varying sources.

Martin ArtQuest (MAQ) is a permanent interactive gallery space at the Frist Art Museum. The MAQ space consists of: a drawing station, a painting station, a printmaking station, a zoetrope station, a shadow theater, a stop-motion animation tool, an interactive Everbright wall composed of color-changing dials, a collaborative textile-weaving installation using a large six-sided art deco grid, a full-body-animated digital painting experience, and a sound pattern station which allows visitor to manipulate frequencies with sand on metal plates. MAQ is run by the Frist's Educational department, which is led by Anne Henderson, who is the Director of Education and Community Engagement.
