= Anne Henderson (educator) =

American museum educator

Anne Henderson is an American museum educator known for her work with children and school programs at The National Gallery of Art. She also worked at the Southern Methodist University at the Meadows Museum and is currently the Director of Education and Community Engagement at the Frist Art Museum.

== Early life and education ==
Anne Henderson was born in Pampa, Texas, a small town in the Texas panhandle. She grew up going to museums in the area, such as the White Deer Museum and the Panhandle Plains Historical Museum. She graduated with a B.A. in English and a minor in Art History from Baker University in Baldwin City, Kansas in 1982. Anne Henderson was later accepted at the University of Texas at Austin and graduated with a M.A. in Art History in 1985. At the University of Texas at Austin, Henderson began working as a docent at the Archer M. Huntington Art Gallery, which was later renamed the Jack S. Blanton Museum of Art.

== Meadows Museum at Southern Methodist University ==
In 1985, Henderson was hired at Southern Methodist University Meadows Museum in Dallas, TX as the Curator of Education. The Meadows Museum holds a substantial Spanish Art collection, which was all given by one collector, Algur H. Meadows. At the Meadows Museum, Henderson carried on docent training and multiple visit programs with school children. Additionally, Henderson also curated an exhibition centered around French artist Rose Bonheur, which eventually traveled to the National Museum for Women in the Arts in 1988.

== The National Gallery of Art ==
Anne Henderson was hired at The National Gallery of Art in Washington D.C. in 1990 as the Senior Educator for School Programs. In 1992, Henderson piloted a high school seminar program at the gallery, which paired 14 high school students with teachers. Once in the museum, each student participated in “behind the scene tours, gallery discussions, and lectures” for eight Saturday mornings. At the end of the program, each student gave presentations at an awards reception. This program is still active today, although it has been renamed “Museum Makers: Exploring Art and Museums.”

Henderson also created the program titled “Art Around the Corner” in 1994 at the National Gallery, which started as “an extension of the multiple visit programs” at the museum. In its first year, the program brought in 136 fifth and sixth grade students “for lessons that integrated looking, critical thinking, and writing skills.” This program is also still active today at the National Gallery and was awarded the Mayoral Award in 2002.

== Frist Art Museum ==
Anne Henderson started at the Frist Center for Visual Arts in 2000. The non-collecting museum was renamed to “Frist Art Museum” in 2018. At the museum, Henderson was hired as the Director of Education and Community Engagement and is still employed at the institution. As a part of her position, Henderson assisted in building the Martin ArtQuest (MAQ) space in the museum. The MAQ space consists of: a drawing station, a painting station, a printmaking station, a zoetrope station, a shadow theater, a stop-motion animation tool, an interactive Everbright wall composed of color-changing dials, a collaborative textile-weaving installation using a large six-sided art deco grid, a full-body-animated digital painting experience, and a sound pattern station which allows visitor to manipulate frequencies with sand on metal plates.

During her time at the Frist, Henderson was also very active with Tennessee Art Education Association (TAEA). She was TAEA President from 2011 to 2013

== National Art Education Association (NAEA) ==
Anne Henderson was the Museum Division Director for the National Art Education Association (NAEA) in 2007–2008. She was also a NAEA Board Member in 2009. Anne Henderson also received the following awards from the NAEA:

- National Art Education Association (NAEA), Regional Award (Virginia), Museum Education Division (1997)
- National Art Education Association (NAEA), National Award, Museum Education Division (2010)
- National Art Education Association (NAEA), Regional Award (Tennessee), Museum Education Division (2014)
