= Fabiana Barreda =

Argentine artist

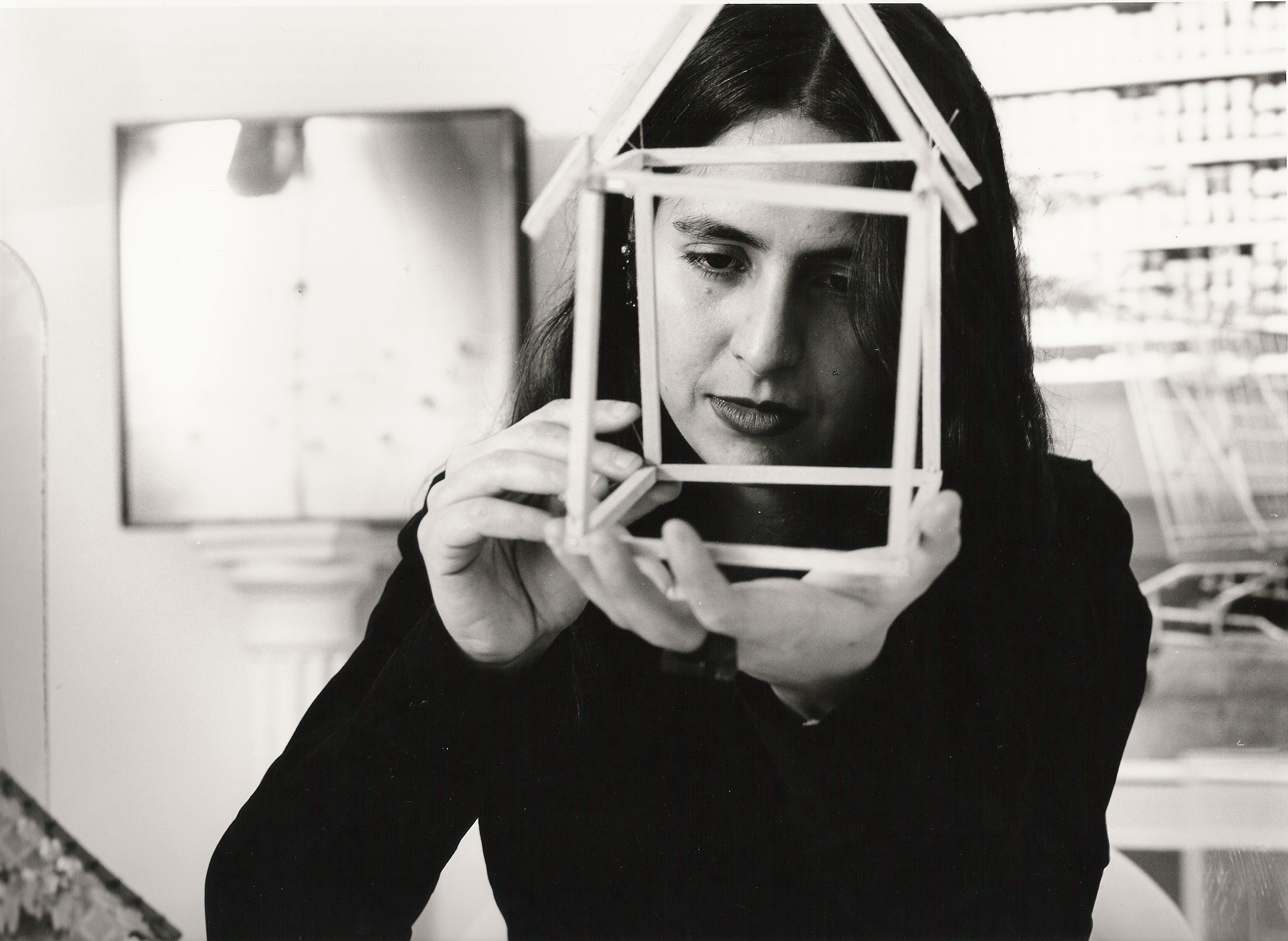
Fabiana Barreda

Fabiana Barreda (Buenos Aires, Argentina. July 27, 1967) is an Argentine photographer, performer, installationist and multimedia artist. Her work specializes in the body, desire and politics of gender. She has participated in national and international exhibitions, being the most important ones in places such as Museum of Modern Art (New York, USA), New York University (USA), International Architecture Biennale Rotterdam (Netherlands), Telefónica Foundation of Madrid (Spain) and Museum of Monterrey – MACO (Mexico).

== Biography and education ==
She is the daughter of the art critic Rosa Faccaro and the archaeologist Luis Federico Barreda Murillo, and the mother of Vladimir Zantleifer Barreda. She studied Psychology at the University of Buenos Aires, where she directs the Art Gallery of the Faculty of Psychology, with the aim of showing the work of young artists. At the end of her university career, she dedicated her interests to the artistic area and studied psychoanalysis, philosophy and art history. In 1996 she obtained a grant from the Antorchas Foundation to participate in a workshop for artists named "Taller de Barracas".

== Career and artistic work ==
From the beginning, the theme of desire was outlined as one of her artistic concerns, for which she approached her work using paradoxes as a procedure for creation. She has participated in solo and group exhibitions, both in Argentina and abroad since 1992. In 1996 she held her first solo show exhibition, "Aura", held in 1996 at the Recoleta Cultural Center (Buenos Aires), Barreda created a series of photo-performances, erotic and mystical self-portraits. With these pieces she addressed the union of the body and technology through photos illuminated in backlight, creating a light installation in a sacred site such as the historic Recoletos Convent, transformed into a cultural place. From there, she made a series of performances and videos building interdisciplinary projects between art and science. Video installations are a recurring medium in her work.

Since 1998, Barreda has addressed the theme of home in her work. Conceptually she developed the house as a symbolic structure of various aspects of the human being, her relationships, her emotions, and her culture, using various materials such as translucent acrylic, light boxes, photography and incorporating new technology. In 2001 she exhibited Proyecto Habitat: recyclables at New York University, curated by Julio Sánchez.

The show Moonwalk, was made up of two series Architecture of Desire and Cosmic Architecture, including five video installations, seven objects structured with LED lights and a total of 21 photo-performances, addressing the time to which modern man is exposed as creator of civilization and its link with a spiritual quest.

Within the development of her artistic work, Barreda constantly crosses between technology and other disciplines such as architecture, psychology, sociology and biopolitics. In this sense, in 2001 marked by the global crisis after the fall of the Twin Towers and the Argentine economic crisis, she developed the series "Arquitectura de Azúcar" narrating social and historical fragility through the construction of national building icons with the use of sugar as raw material. It was exhibited and obtained the Third Mention of the Banco Nación Award, in which it was judged and curated by Jorge López Anaya, Marcelo Pacheco, Fernando Farina, Laura Buccellato and Clorindo Testa, along with the specialists Dan Cameron from the New Museum, North American and Aracy Amaral, Brazilian.

The multimedia installation "Proyecto Hábitat Arquitectura de Azúcar Casa Rosada – A house for the Casa Rosada", features a series of backlights where the Casa Rosada (Argentine government palace) is attacked by godzillas, similarly to the Twin Towers. In the center, a Casa Rosada of sugar under an acrylic dome stands as a desire for persistence in the face of any adversity. Ideological force gives consistency to that emblem of a nation made of sugar. A pink human-scale house, symbolizing the Government House, houses inside the sugar model, the photographs on screens, giving from the art a positive look on an extreme moment. It is rebuilt each time it is installed as a metaphor for Argentina and the world, where the subject gets up every day and rebuilds her project of life and nation. The exhibition anticipates and coincides with the moment of the corralito in December 2001. This piece, as a symbol of that historical moment, is part of the heritage of the Buenos Aires Museum of Modern Art (MAMBA).

Barreda presented the exhibition "El Final del Eclipse" in 2001, with the Habitat Project: recyclables, carried out at the Fundación Telefónica de Madrid with the curatorship of Jose Jiménez, shows that it travels in Latin America and Europe. It is a thesis on Latin American conceptual art, in which Barreda's installation reflects on the social and political processes in Latin America, from a critical, reconstructive and poetic perspective. The work is narrated with seven large backlights, which address other artists in the show such as: Liliana Porter, Cildo Meireles, Jorge Macchi, Pablo Reinoso, Augusto Zanela, José Damasceno, Eduardo Kac, Ernesto Neto, Rosãngela Rennó, Tunga, Adriana Varejão, Alfredo Jaar, María Fernanda Cardoso, Nadín Ospina, Carlos Garaicoa, Ernesto Leal, Marta María Pérez Bravo, Gustavo Artigas, Abraham Cruzvillegas, Yolanda Gutiérrez, César Martínez, Pablo Vargas Lugo, Luis Camnitzer and Meyer Vaisman. She presented this project in 2017 in the International Biennial of Contemporary Art of South America, BIENALSUR, at the Brazilian Embassy. The curator was Cristina Rossi and was organized by the Universidad Tres de Febrero – UNTREF.

Barreda presented the Habitat Project at the Havana Biennial in 2001, with the "Smart Station" concept, intelligent architecture and home automation, through various media, such as the photographic installation of subways and airports in different global metropolises and their social and technological metaphors. She developed the work from the theoretical perspective of Marc Auge, Walter Benjamin, Michel Foucault, Jacques Lacan and Jacques Derrida.

In 2002 Barreda presented the works Architecture of Water, Architecture of Sand and Architecture of Light in the exhibition "Dreams of water. Sand houses", which consisted of ecological installations on architecture as a metaphor for subjective and social regeneration from nature. Photos of castles, sea foam and snail eggs, the town hall under water with grass growing inside.

With the Habitat Project: Utopia and Deconstruction at Fundación Telefónica (Telefónica) curated by Corinne Abadi in 2004, she worked with the house and the occupied territories from the image. In the multimedia exhibition, she developed the series "Arquitectura del Deseo", an emotional modulor of photoperformances where she wrote about the body, and presented an architectural thesis from Xul Solar and Gordon Matta-Clark to Amancio Williams with his work "Casa del Puente". Acrylic models with emblems of national architecture such as the Cabildo de Buenos Aires crossing with the Madí movement, make up the pieces of the exhibition.

In 2007, Barreda presented the multimedia installation Habitat Project: Utopia and Deconstruction within the End of the World Biennial in Ushuaia, Tierra del Fuego. The work included a tribute to Le Corbusier's Curutchet House, in an acrylic model with portable DVD players, along with video projections. In it, she developed the relationships between body architecture and feminism through a tribute to "La casa de cristal" by Italian architect Lina Bo Bardi.

With several of the models and video installations that make up the Habitat: Utopia Project, she participated together with other artists in the exhibition "Utopian reality" at the South Korean Embassy in 2011. Throughout her artistic career, the theme of mysticism through the figure of the warrior and martial arts is a constant. Barreda presented in 2011 the multimedia installation "Argentina Skateland and the Tattoo of Eros". In the video the tattoos and drawings are on the bodies of two protagonists: a spiritual skater warrior who falls in love with the allegorical woman of the pyramid of May (monument in the central square of Argentina). With the support of the Embassy of Japan, in 2012 she participated in "Satori", an art and technology exhibition on Japanese culture in a Japanese garden, in homage to Sei Shōnagon, Murasaki Shikibu Bushido, Matsuo Bashō, Dàodé Jīng, Peter Greenaway and text by Amalia Sato editor of Tokonoma magazine and based on the practice of kung fu, iado and kendo.

The MAR Museum in Mar del Plata was the setting for the exhibition "Horizons of Desire" in 2014, curated by Rodrigo Alonso. The artist presented the multimedia installation Hogar Modulor, "My home are the lines of my hand", a fluorescent acrylic house, photographs and models with video installations inside. Barreda calls that house a playful therapeutic architectural object, which is part of a performance where the viewer holds it in her hand. Then, this installation was presented with Tramando by Martin Churba, at fashion week and in the National Museum of Decorative Arts, Buenos Aires.

In 2015 she participated with the Sound Body – Reactable Alphabet at the Sónar Festival within the Espacio Pla exhibition, held at the Usina del Arte. There she presented an installation with the Sound Body app for Apple iPad. The intersections between ecology and technology are also territories Barreda explores. In 2015, she participated in the exhibition "Volatile happiness" curated by Rodrigo Alonso at the Parque de la Memoria Museum, where she took up the 1999 series, "Proyecto Hábitat: Reciclables", a series of photo-performances where the author appears in a costume made with plastic packaging. Food, which she made during the economic crisis of 2001 and with which she carried out a series of urban actions in which she represented a nomadic character who circulates through the supermarkets called "Circuit of Consumption", "Circuit of Garbage" and "Urban Circuits "in symbolic neighborhoods like Constitución and La Boca as an ecological designation. In 2016 she exhibited together with Martín Bonadeo, Augusto Zanela and Gonzalo Lauda, called Grupo Fractal, the Ecological Project in the national technological park, Tecnópolis, as part of the activities of the Ministry of Environment and Sustainable Development of Argentina. The work consisted of four domes representing the four elements of nature, which were viewed from Google Earth due to its light installation, indicating the intention of art to protect the environment.

Barreda explored interactivity in social networks and its implementation in the art world. In 2019, after winning a Grant for the Creation of the National Endowment for the Arts for the development of the Transmodernism project, she developed pieces in lenticular technology, 3D objects, videos and filters for Instagram and Facebook, along with a prototype of an augmented reality app with interactivity with the user, UX. She developed a digital avatar of herself to create a biopolitical digital space of existence. With this project, Barreda researched the relationships between the body, architecture, society and technology. She developed a digital avatar of herself to create a biopolitical space of digital existence.

In 2020 Barreda participated in the immersive experience of the art and technology exhibition of Tarjeta Naranja, a company that belongs to Banco Galicia, with the curatorship of Florencia Battiti and Daniel R. Fischer and in the Photo London selection.

Barreda's work is represented in the collections of the Museum of Latin American Art of Buenos Aires, MALBA with the work Home Module, my home are the lines of my hand (2004) that belongs to "Proyecto Hábitat", Museum of Modern Art of Buenos Aires, the BA Art Foundation, New York University and the Museo Castagnino de Rosario. Some of her works are in the collection of the Ministry of Education of Argentina with the piece Knowledge, Hypatia Biblioteca del Maestro (2017), whose name refers to the Greek mathematician and philosopher Hipatia, as a tribute, including prominent authors such as Pizarnik, Foucault, and Spinoza. With this piece that was exhibited at The Night of the Museums, she reflected on the importance of preserving the cultural heritage through the technique of video mapping. In addition to public collections, her work is part of the following private collections: Jerry Speyer, Mariano Marcondes Ferraz, Fabio Szwarcwald, Frances Reynolds.

Barreda's work participated in the Latin American photography circuit from the Schneider Gallery in Chicago. On March 8, in the context of women's day, she won a 2022 edition visual arts acquisition award Premio 8M, granted by the Argentine state for the preservation of art made by women and dissidents outside the patriarchal system.

== Prizes and awards ==
Barreda has received the following distinctions:

- Photographer of the Year Award from the Argentine Association of Art Critics (1999).
- Leonardo Award for Photographer of the Year awarded by the Museum of Contemporary Art of Buenos Aires (2000)
- Honorable Mention of the Banco Nación Award, Argentina (2001)
- Acquisition of the Habitat Project – Sugar Architecture: Casita de Tucumán de Azúcar. Castagnino de Rosario + Macro Museum. 2001
- Diploma of Merit in Visual Arts-Installation awarded by the Konex Foundation, Argentina (2002)
- Chandon Buenos Aires Photo Award. Buenos Aires, Argentina (2007)
- Citi Creative Woman Award + University of Palermo. Buenos Aires, Argentina (2015)
- New Facilities and Alternative Media Award Selection for Sound Body – Reactable Alphabet, application for iPad support (Apple) and electronic system created by the Pompeu Fabra University. National Hall. Palais de Glace (2015)
- Visual Arts Acquisition Award Premio 8M (2022)

== Biennals ==
- Selection at the VII Biennial of Havana, Cuba (2000)
- Selection at the International Architecture Biennale Rotterdam, Holland (2003)
- End of the World Biennial in Ushuaia, Argentina (2007)
- Biennial of Contemporary Art of South America, BIENALSUR, Argentina (2017)

== Scholarships ==
- Grant from Fundación Antorchas to participate in the Barracas Workshop, Argentina (1996). With this grant she developed the exhibition "Aura" at the Centro Cultural Recoleta, where she presented light boxes, photo performances, about the body, the sacred and memory. She developed a series of experimental photographs and quotes to Martin Chambi through an apocryphal family album.
- Salzburg Global Seminar of Schloss Leopolskrom, Austria (1999). With this scholarship she presented her work "Aura" in Austria at an interdisciplinary congress about dance, music and visual arts. From there she developed a series of works on the body and experimental music.
- Grant from the National Endowment for the Arts, Argentina (2001). With the Grant from the Fondo Nacional de las Artes she developed her work "Proyecto: Reciclables" a series on urban actions, photo-performances, video – performances and objects.
- Grant subsidy to the Creation of the Antorchas Foundation, Argentina (2002)
- Grant for the creation of the National Fund for the Arts for the work Proyecto Habitat Transmodernismo, Argentina (2019)

== Curator ==
Barreda's path in curatorship began in 1987. Together with Julio Sánchez, she curated the exhibition El Margen de lo Mínimo at the Centro de Arte y Comunicación (CAyC) directed by Jorge Glusberg. Since 2010 she has been curating the gallery of the Ricardo Rojas Cultural Center, UBA, where she developed exhibitions on neo-feminism and technology, among which are "Expanded Body Deconstruction", "Extreme Body Sensitivity Digital" among many others In 2016, she curated "Body & Desire", a collective exhibition at the Arte x Arte Fundación Alfonso y Luz Castillo gallery, in which 100 works by 65 artists were exhibited on the potential of the body as a political-erotic subject and its link with technology. The exhibition included works by renowned national and international photographers, such as Nan Goldin, Humberto Rivas, Cindy Sherman, Mariano Sardón, Sofía López Mañán, Marcos López, Erwin Olaf, Robert Mapplethorpe, Shen Wei and Janine Antoni. Also, in 2018, together with Joseph Kugielsky and Matias Roth, she curated the collective exhibition Infinito at the Jewish Museum of Buenos Aires, in which artists such as Liliana Porter, Joseph Kosuth, Luis Benedit, Mildred Burton, Luis Felipe Noé, Pedro Roth and Graciela Sacco participated.

== Academic activity ==
Barreda's teaching career has included the subjects of Art Psychology at the National University of Tres de Febrero and Contemporary art at the University Institute of Art and Biodesign in the Interactive Design Master at the School of Design and Urbanism of the University of Buenos Aires. She gave seminars in the careers of Clothing Design, Psychology and Architecture at the University of Buenos Aires as well as lectures, including a face-to-face meeting in the exhibition Robert Mapplethorpe, Eros and Order, the training course "Infraleves: photography from Duchamp to Gabriel Orozco" and the round table "Cartography of our photography" (2010), which were held at the Museum of Latin American Art, MALBA.

== Publications ==
In 1998 Barreda edited the book La Ciudad Subterránea, a photographic essay with texts by Marc Augé, Clorindo Testa, Marcelo Pacheco and Jorge López Anaya with the presentation of Inés Katzenstein. From this editorial project arises an alternative publication entitled Habitat Project Manifesto that he made in 2001 that is part of the universe of the Habitat Project work project. In 2018, it is part of the artistic catalog of the Ministry of Education of the Nation of the Argentine Republic. In 2019 she participated in the exhibition "Artists' Books from Latin America, Printed Matter" that took place at the Museum of Modern Art in New York – MoMa, an initiative that aims to show the work of the "artist's book" as an entity of work. Several of her publications have been donated to the library of the Ibero-American Institute of Prussian Cultural Heritage.

== See also ==
- Andrés Waissman
- Sergio Castiglione
- Liliana Porter
- Eduardo Kac
- Rosângela Rennó
- Carlos Garaicoa
