= Quisqueya Henríquez =

Cuban-born Dominican artist (1966–2024)

- Born: 1966; Havana, Cuba
- Died: 30 March 2024 (aged 58); Santo Domingo, Dominican Republic
- Other name: Quisqueya Henriquez
- Education: Universidad Autónoma de Santo Domingo, Instituto Superior de Arte
- Movement: Conceptual art

Quisqueya Henríquez (1966 – 30 March 2024) was a Cuban-born Dominican multidisciplinary contemporary artist. She worked in the mediums of sculpture, photography, sound art, installation art, video art, and collage. Henríquez's work has been included in many international exhibitions and biennials.

== Biography ==
Quisqueya Henríquez was born in 1966 in Havana, Cuba, and lived in Santo Domingo, Dominican Republic from the time when she was a child. She studied at the Universidad Autónoma de Santo Domingo (Autonomous University of Santo Domingo; UASD); and studied from 1987 to 1992 at the Instituto Superior de Arte (ISA) in Havana.

Henríquez emerged as an avant-garde in the late-1980s. Henríquez's work addresses issues such as conventions of race, ethnicity, and gender encountered in Caribbean and Latin cultures. Her notable performance work includes "De él Helado de agua de mar Caribe" (2002), where ice cream was made with Caribbean sea water (a fundamental ingredient to the work), whey, rum, coconut oil, blue color, and stabilizers.

In 2007, Bronx Museum of the Arts held the mid-career survey exhibition of her work titled, "Quisqueya Henríquez: The World Outside: A Survey Exhibition 1991–2007", which travelled in 2008 to the Miami Art Museum (now Pérez Art Museum Miami). The survey commented on Latin American modernist art and its relation to European traditional art historical movements and featured sculpture, installations, collage, and video.

Her work can be found in museum and public collections including El Museo del Barrio in New York City, New York; the Museum of Contemporary Art, North Miami in Miami, Florida; the Pérez Art Museum Miami in Miami, Florida; Ninart Centro de Cultura in Mexico City, Mexico; and the Rhode Island School of Design Museum in Providence, Rhode Island.

Henríquez died on 30 March 2024, at the age of 58 of stomach cancer.

== Exhibitions ==
=== Solo exhibitions ===
- Artists Space, New York City, New York;
- the Mattress Factory, Pittsburgh, Pennsylvania;
- Museo Rufino Tamayo, Mexico City, Mexico;
- The Contemporary Museum, Baltimore, Maryland
- "Quisqueya Henriquez: Intertextualidad" (2006), David Castillo Gallery, Miami, Florida
- "Quisqueya Henríquez The World Outside: A Survey Exhibition 1991–2007" (2007–2008, traveling), Bronx Museum of the Arts, New York City, New York, and the Miami Art Museum (now Pérez Art Museum Miami)

=== Group exhibitions ===
- "Miami: Human Nature", New Museum (1995–1996), New York City, New York;
- "Defining the Nineties: Consensus-making in New York, Miami, and Los Angeles" (1996), Museum of Contemporary Art, North Miami, Miami, Florida;
- INSITE 97 (1997), San Diego, California;
- "No Lo Llames" performance at El Museo del Barrio, New York City, New York;
- "Island Nations: New Art from Cuba, the Dominican Republic, Puerto Rico, and the Diaspora" (2004), RISD Museum of Art, Providence, Rhode Island;
- 23 Bienal Nacional (2005), Santa Domingo, Dominican Republic
- "This Skin I’m In: Contemporary Dominican Art from the Permanent Collection" (2007), El Museo del Barrio, New York City, New York.
- "Infinite Island: Contemporary Caribbean Art" (2007–2008), Brooklyn Museum of Art, New York City, New York; included Quisqueya Henríquez, Alexandre Arrechea, Ewan Atkinson, Nicole Awai, Mario Benjamin, Terry Boddie, Charles Campbell, Keisha Castello, Chris Cozier, José Cruz, Annalee Davis, Maxence Denis, Jean Ulrick Désert, Roberto Diago, Satch Hoyt, Deborah Jack, Hew Locke, Miguel Luciano, Tirzo Martha, Ibrahim Miranda, Melvin Moti, Santiago Rodríguez Olazábal, Steve Ouditt, Raquel Paiewonsky, Ebony Patterson, Marta María Pérez Bravo, Jorge Pineda, K. Khalfani Ra (also known as Makandal Dada), Veronica Ryan, Storm Saulter, Colectivo Shampoo, Arthur Simms and Peter Omer
- "Beyond the Supersquare" (2014–2015), Bronx Museum of the Arts, New York City, New York; included Quisqueya Henríquez, Alexandre Arrechea, Carlos Garaicoa, and Los Carpinteros
