= Arrechea =

Arrechea or Arretxea is a Basque surname. Notable people with this surname include:

- Alexandre Arrechea (born 1970), Cuban artist
- Carlos Arrechea (born 1990), Cuban actor
- Hernando Arrechea (born 1943-2009 died), Colombian hurdler
- Yovanny Arrechea (born 1983), Colombian footballer
