= Mauricio Alejo =

Mexican artist (born 1969)

Mauricio Alejo (born 1969 in Mexico City) is an artist based in New York and Mexico City. His work revolves around photographs and videos recordings of everyday objects, sometimes either cut or painted, set up in absurdist arrangements. He has participated in a total of 57 exhibitions, with his most notable participations being at the Bronx Museum of the Arts, Miami Art Central, the Museo Nacional Centro de Arte Reina Sofía, and the 8th Havana Biennial. He has also participated in solo exhibitions, biennials, and art fairs, mostly in Mexico (a total of 27 times) and the United States (a total of 12 times). Mauricio Alejo's first certified exhibition was Fotofest 2000, The Eighth International Month of Photography, at the FotoFest Biennial in Houston, TX, in 2000. Mauricio Alejo’s work has been in at least one museum collection, at Daros Latinamerica in Zurich.

He has participated in group exhibitions at the Bronx Museum of the Arts, Miami Art Central, Museo Nacional Centro de Arte Reina Sofía and the 8th Havana Biennial.

== Type of Art ==
Mauricio Alejo often likes to make art based on the simplicity of everyday objects. His type of work can range from a simple photo of a blanket to a beautiful piece focusing on an everyday object. His type of work is meant to bring peace to your mind and show how everyday objects can be used for any type of art. His art is meant to be playful and bend your mind to see our perception of the objects used. Alejo often likes to have his work represent a calm state of mind and add a spin to what can often be seen as the mundane aspects of our day-to-day lives. “I hope to bring the items into a new narrative that doesn’t obey their functionality," said the photographer. He often collects objects that embody his personal memories, as they allow him to cast doubt on dogmatic opinions on space and meaning by creating unusual narratives with objects that are not fascinating but that become interesting in their randomness and absurdity.
