= H Committee of Human Vindication =

Art collective by Rodrigo Azaola

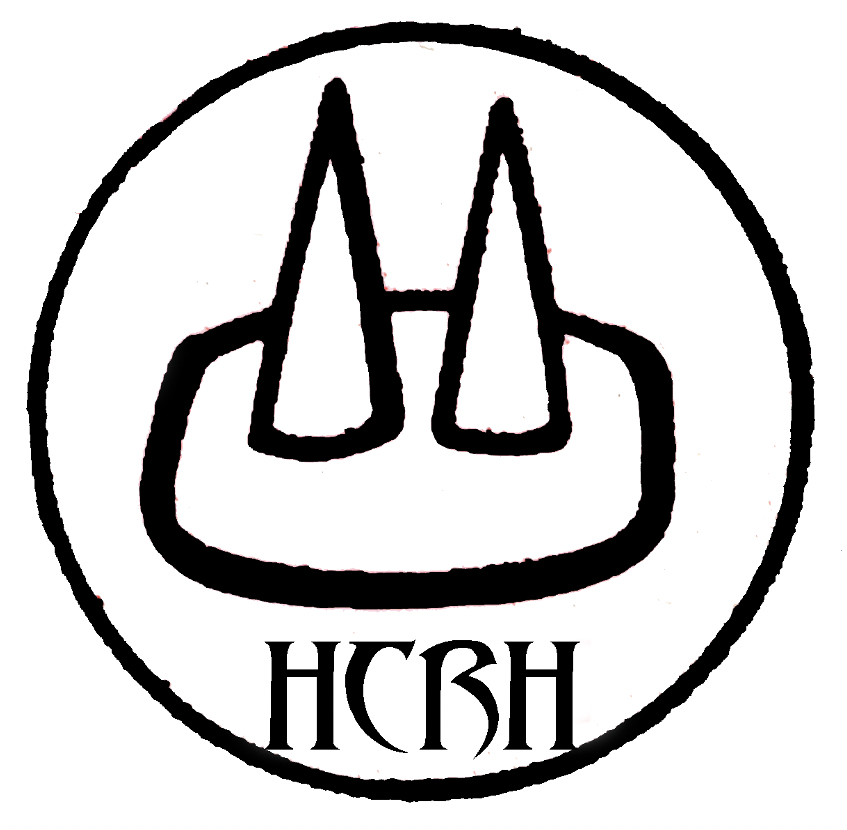
HCRH logo

The H Committee of Human Vindication (Spanish: H Comité de Reivindicación Humana), better known by its initials HCRH, is a Mexican art collective founded by Rodrigo Azaola, Artemio Narro and Octavio Serra that operated as a phantom and universal pseudo-organization, supposedly founded in 1947. The HCRH created numerous conferences, texts, actions, editorial projects, music, radio programs and artworks that utilize a highly ironic and intellectual language for "ridiculing the hollow pomposity of institutional culture." The public art activities of the HCRH, in festivals for example, were produced between 1996 and 2004, a period in which globalization and neoliberal politics in Mexico were incipient and the market-driven art world was consolidated.

Its work has been shown at various venues including: Museo Jumex, Mexico City; Havana Biennial, Cuba; Witte de With Center for Contemporary Art, Rotterdam; CCA Wattis Institute for Contemporary Arts, San Francisco; National Centre of Contemporary Arts, Moscow; Museo Carrillo Gil, Mexico City; Centre d'Art Santa Monica, Barcelona; Ex-Teresa, Mexico City; Americas Society, New York; Museo Tamayo, Mexico City; among others.

In 1999, the HCRH created one of its more notable actions: The Universal Destitution Campaign, which consisted of a letter sent by fax to several Mexican political and cultural personalities, ordering them to abandon their posts on the grounds of unsatisfactory performance. The extensive list of recipients included presidential candidates, politicians, social activists, artists, writers, art critics and journalists.The campaign ended up with officials from the Ministry of Interior visiting the HCRH members' homes.

Another campaign by the HCRH was the massive distribution of stickers (1998–1999) in Mexico City that read, "When injustice is law, resistance is a must." In 2002, the ephemeral and phantasmagoric nature of their work materialized in an image of the HCRH logo, drawn with salt on the entrance floor of the Carrillo Gil Museum, and which the passage of visitors and workers of the museum blurred as they stepped in."

For the 7th Havana Biennial (2000) the HCRH created a free ice cream distribution project, as well as the distribution of hundreds of books, among them: Brave New World by Aldous Huxley, Gulag Archipelago by Aleksandr Solzhenitsyn and 1984 by George Orwell.

The HCRH also organized several academic conferences with fictitious international scholars in different universities and museums – such as Universidad Iberoamericana, Universidad Intercontinental, Museo Rufino Tamayo and Faculty of Arts and Design (formerly known as the Escuela Nacional de Artes Plásticas or ENAP). They also created numerous fictional radio programs that were transmitted on XEUN-FM, the radio station of the National Autonomous University of Mexico.

While the work of the HCRH is mostly intangible and ephemeral, they created a number of architectural drawings and blueprints for fictional urbanization plans, such as the Children Vineyard (a chain of orphanages built along the Northern Hemisphere wine regions), the Payoff Memorial, the Air Crash Memorial (as part of the 1998 project NY AWAKE: "long before the collapse of the twin towers, 'monuments unequivocally indicate that Man learns from his own history, and —contrary to popular belief— he enjoys repeating it") and The Museum of Good (2003).

Conceptualized as a spherical building, The Museum of Good is a two-faced institution. In one side, everything that throughout human history may be considered as culturally good and kind it's collected and exhibited. In the other side, all things considered as shameful and ignominious are represented.The fictitious architectural model refers to the dual character of cultural institutions, not only as places of knowledge, but also as systems that operate according to political and cultural ideologies, occasionally financed by questionable corporations, for which art serves as a tool to achieve political and economical aims. The Museum of Good was last exhibited in 2016 at the Jumex Museum.

In 2019, the monograph HCRH: Septuagésimo Aniversario 1947–2017 was published by Alumnos 47 Foundation. The book was edited by Rodrigo Azaola and Eva Posas.

Rodrigo Azaola and Artemio Narro are fellows of the National System of Artistic Creators of the National Fund of Culture and Arts (FONCA).
