= Melvin Moti =

Dutch photographer and video artist

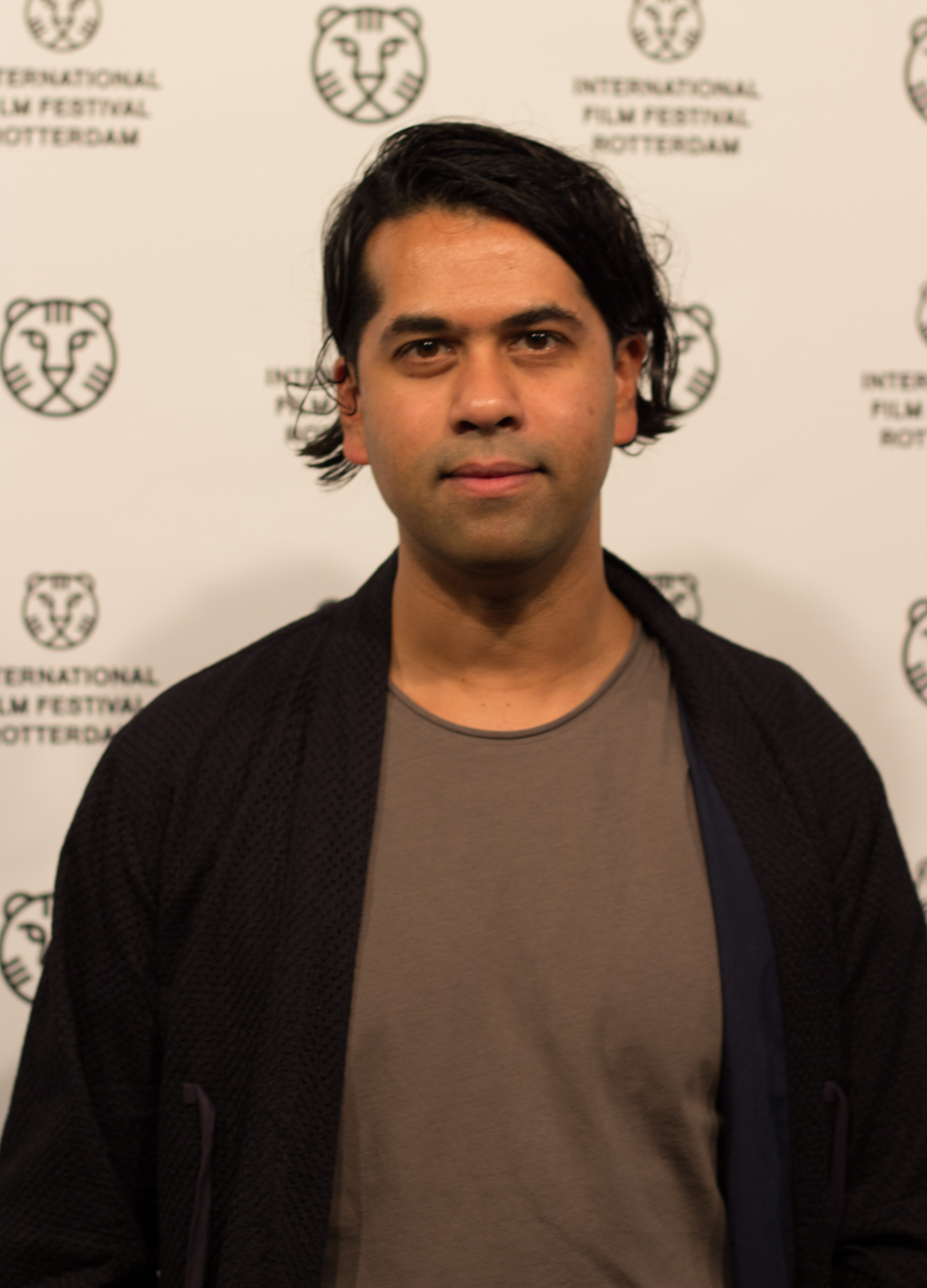
Melvin Moti at the International Film Festival Rotterdam, 2020

Melvin Moti (born 1977) is a Dutch contemporary video and media artist who examines neurological, scientific and historic processes in relation to visual culture. His work explores ideas of human experiences of spirituality, space, time and consciousness.

== Life and work ==
Moti was born in Rotterdam and studied audiovisual design (16- and 8mm films) at the Academie voor Beeldende Vorming in Tilburg from 1995 to 1999. After graduating, Moti continued his education at De Ateliers in Amsterdam between 1999 and 2001. In 2001, Moti was nominated for the Pontprijs, the Tilburgprijs and the Montevideo Award. In 2006, Moti lived and worked in both Rotterdam and Berlin, and had a residency at Künstlerhaus Bethanien. Moti has had solo exhibitions at Mudam (Luxembourg), WIELS (Brussels), Galleria Civica (Trento), the Stedelijk Museum (Amsterdam) and the Museum für Moderne Kunst (Frankfurt). Over the last years he has produced several films along with artist books, objects and drawings.

In his works, Moti researches neurological, scientific and historic aspects of visual culture to infuse his artworks with meaning. Moti views his practice as creating a void to be filled with the viewer's consciousness. Moti states himself that his works engage with “sensory experiences as an important source of information", and that he "creates relationships between what people see and what they think".

== Selected art projects ==
Some of Moti's most frequently exhibited works include:

=== No Show (2004) ===
In No Show, the viewer is tempted to use his own imagination: in this film, the spectator hears a tour being conducted at the Leningrad Hermitage, alongside static images of emptied museum galleries. During the Second World War, the Hermitage was evacuated of artworks due to the imminent threat of bombing. No Show tells the story of a young museum employee who allegedly continued to give tours during that period. The film's narrator describes the absent works of art in great detail to attempt to evoke vivid pictures.

=== The Black Room (2005) ===
Moti's first solo exhibition in a museum, The Black Room, features a montage of two disparate elements: footage of frescos from the Villa Agrippa near Pompeii and a sound track consisting of an imaginary interview with the surrealist poet Robert Desnos. In the interview, based on a variety of historical sources, a female voice interrogates “Desnos” about the famous “période des sommeils” just before the launch of Surrealism in 1922-23. The interviewer voices her concern about the possible mental health issues as a result of the surrealist’s experiments with ‘sleep-writing’, a form of self-hypnosis during which the subjects recorded poems, texts and images. Desnos refutes these ideas and engages in conversation with the interviewer, while the video projection slowly shows details of the Pompeian frescoes.

=== Miamilism (2008) ===
Miamilism is a text based work that takes actress Mia Farrow as the focal point. It presents the cover of an issue of Life magazine illustrated with a faded photograph of Farrow. The magazine is concurrent with Roman Polanski’s film Rosemary's Baby (1968), and conceptually, the fading of the portrait is analogous to the way Farrow’s character develops in the film: Appearing increasingly pale throughout the film.

In the cover of the Life magazine, Farrow’s skin has become pale as a result of exposure to light. The yellow and red hues in the ink fade, while her eyes appear to become greener over the years.

=== The Prisoner's Cinema (2008) ===
In this work Moti examines abstract, colourful images that can appear as an effect of visual deprivation. When a person stares at a flat, monochrome surface for an extended period of time, the brain responds to the lack of visual stimuli by producing a colourful and abstract pattern of lights. Moti’s film explores this mental process through depicting his own pattern of colours.

=== From Dust to Dust (2010) ===
From Dust to Dust is a Gesamtkunstwerk of an art book, a film and objects, exhibited at the Wiels in Brussels. The exhibition features a carved-wood bookstand holding Moti’s artist book Dust, which lies open at a colour reproduction of the Peacock Room (1876-7) by James McNeill Whistler (now in the Freer Gallery, Washington), as an early example of installations (called arrangements by Whistler). The walls of the exhibition space are lined with different shades of patterned fabrics. The main piece, again titled Dust, is a 12-minute digital animation of whirling dust particles. Finally, there are two drawings which underwent an artificial ageing treatment to look more than a century old, and the Portrait of Mary Barnadiston (ca. 1755) by Sir Joshua Reynolds. Due to the paints used in the portrait, Mary Barnadiston's skin tone have faded.

=== Spectral Spectrum (2015) ===
Spectral Spectrum is an exhibition developed by Moti for the ABN AMRO Art Award. Moti explores ideas about time, space, perception and consciousness. His starting point was the early work of the Dutch artist JCJ Vanderheyden (1928-2012). Vanderheyden painted curved and crooked horizons onto narrow piles of wood, depicting the view from an airplane window and referring to an infinite empty space. The airplane window itself appears in part, but also functions as a frame lending itself to the image before the painting is completed. When spectators would tilt their heads, the world moved in a similar fashion, foregrounding perspective and perception within the works. In his displaying of Vanderheyden's works in the context of his own work and in combination with the work from the ABN AMRO collection, Moti combines Vanderheyden's ideas about consciousness with his own.

The Spectral Spectrum exhibition is divided into four themes: “Experiments with Time”, “Space and Consciousness”, “The Creation of Myths”, and “Space and Absence”. Vanderheyden's experiments with time and consciousness acquire spatial and visual form in the context of Moti's work.

==== Experiments with Time ====
In “Experiments with Time”, Moti introduces a time line in the exhibition by including works by the English painter Sir Joshua Reynolds (1723-1792) and the work of the Dutch artist Steven Aalders (1959), and juxtaposing them with his own work Miamilism (2008). In his work, Reynolds often used a transparent layer of lake pigments in order to enhance the skin tone in his portraits. However, lake pigments are not colourfast; as a result, the skin tone in Reynold's early work has faded in comparison to the rest of the painting, which was painted with colourfast paints. This created different effects during the ageing of the work, interpreted by Moti as a ‘passing of time’. Moti's own work Miamilism underwent a similar treatment, with Mia Farrow's skin tone becoming increasingly pale throughout the years.

==== Space and Consciousness ====
In “Space and Consciousness” Moti presents two works: Relief R72-43 (1972) by Dutch artist Jan Schoonhoven (1914-1994) and an excerpted page from a book by Philipp Franz Balthasar von Siebold (1796-1866) entitled Nippon: Archiv our Beschreibung von Japan und dessen Neben- und Schutzländern, jetzo mit den südlichen Kurilen, Sachalin, Korea und den Liukiu- Inseln.

Von Siebold was one of the first westerners to lecture on western medicine in Japan, researching Japanese flora and fauna. The page from his book used in Moti's exhibition shows Zen priests during zazen (a form of meditation), the practitioner subdues his will and surrenders to the changing environment inside and outside the body. Through sensory experiences, he concentrates on everything that has form changes, and how change does not assume fixed form. During zazen the texture of time and space becomes perceptible.

Relief R72-43 by Schoonhoven is a work consisting of a grid of lines and narrow gaps of paper maché. Depending on how light falls on the work, it can vary between having a rigid texture or appearing to be a monochrome work.

==== The Creation of Myths ====
For “The Creation of Myths” Moti created a series of four drawings, Secret Seals (2015), based on a book of nineteenth-century documents containing illustrations of secret hand gestures that inspire strength and meditation. These hand gestures are supposedly used by Japanese Shingon Buddhists, to codify the cosmic function of body, speech and spirit.

==== Space and Absence ====
In fourth final part of Spectral Spectrum, “Space and Absence”, Moti explores consciousness. He presents a work by the Dutch artist Lidwien van de Ven (1963), whose work focuses on subjects such as politics and religion. Her photographs depict events that might seem familiar from journalism - however, they present things that fall outside the context of news stories and explore the invisible side of reporting by the media. By using van de Ven's photographic work, Moti attempts to explore a gap between looking and understanding, and challenges perception and reason.

== Exhibitions ==
=== Solo exhibitions ===
- 2014 - MAM Project 021, Mori Art Museum, Tokyo, Japan
- 2012 - One Thousand Points of Light: Melvin Moti, National Museum of Scotland, Edinburgh, United Kingdom
- 2007 - Docking Station: Melvin Moti - E.S.P., Stedelijk Museum, Amsterdam, the Netherlands
- 2005 - The Black Room, Stedelijk Museum, Amsterdam, the Netherlands

=== Group exhibitions ===
- 2019 - Istanbul Biennial, Istanbul, Turkey
- 2014 - Yokohama Triennial, Yokohama, Japan
- 2013 - Venice Biennale, Venice, Italy
- 2004 - Something Happened, Stedelijk Museum Bureau Amsterdam at the KunstRAI, Amsterdam, the Netherlands
- 2002 - Early Works, De Ateliers, Amsterdam, the Netherlands

== Awards ==
- 2006 Charlotte Köhler Award, Amsterdam, the Netherlands
- 2006 J.C. van Lanschot Award, Den Bosch, the Netherlands
- 2007 Karl-Ströher Award, Frankfurt, Germany
- 2008 Dolf Henkes Award, Rotterdam, the Netherlands
- 2015 ABN AMRO Art Award, Amsterdam, the Netherlands
