= René Francisco =

Cuban artist

- Born: 1960 (age 64–65); Holguín, Cuba
- Education: Instituto Superior de Arte
- Occupation: Visual artist

René Francisco (born 1960, Holguín, Cuba) is a Cuban contemporary artist living in Havana.

== Biography ==
He entered the ISA (Instituto Superior de Arte) as a student in 1977, graduated in 1982, and studied until 1989, when he became a professor. He is very popular due to his unorthodox teaching methods, he sometimes leaves the Institute and the classes happen outside.

Rene Francisco's determination to create interaction between students and professors led him to create Galería DUPP, Desde una Pedagogía Pragmática (through a pragmatic pedagogy) in 1989. René Francisco talks admiringly and expansively about the ISA, which isn't for him only a school to learn to paint, but a school of ideas, where the professors try to shape the students. More than a few of Francisco's former students, such as Alexandre Arrechea, Wilfredo Prieto and Duvier del Dago Fernandez, have gone on to achieve artistic prominence on their own.

René Francisco is an artist who has done a lot for the cause of conceptual art and community development. His commitment to El Romerillo, one of Havana's most notorious slums, extends beyond artistic interest. In 2003 he received a grant from a foundation in Berlin that he decided to use to give an art project to the foundation and help residents of El Romerillo at the same time. He renovated Rosa Estévez's house and his Casa de Rosa pictures were exhibited in Berlin late in 2003. In 2004, René Francisco turned the yard of Marcelina Ochoa, who everyone in El Romerillo called “Nin”, into a garden. He also provided her medical treatments. He exhibited his documentation of El Patio de Nin at the 52nd Venice Biennial in 2007.

René Francisco's studio is filled with extremely interesting paintings. Paint has been layered on canvas with a spatula, using a painstaking, pointillist technique. Most of the paintings have sociological and political themes. One of them shows masses of indistinguishable faces in black-and-white. Another shows seamstresses sewing flags in a mass of red, blue and white.
