= Rosângela Rennó =

Brazilian artist (born 1962)

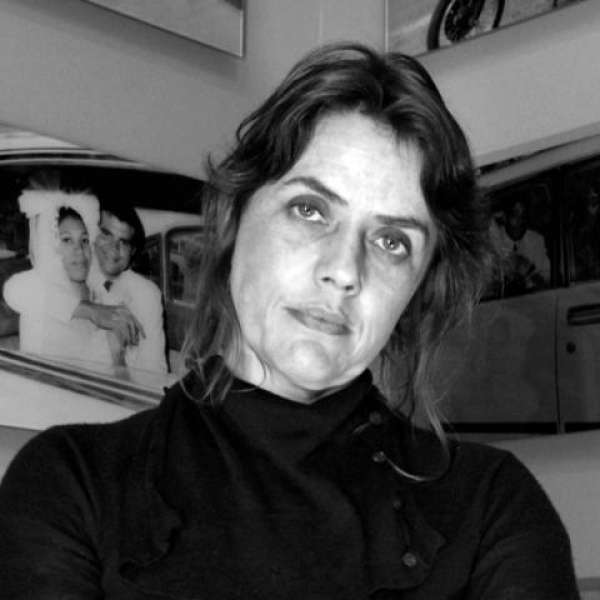
- Born: November 19, 1962 (age 63); Belo Horizonte, Minas Gerais, Brazil
- Education: Bachelor in Architecture from UFMG, and in Arts from Escola Guignard. PhD from USP.
- Known for: photography, appropriation, installation
- Awards: The Paris Photo, Aperture Foundation PhotoBook Awards 2013 - First PhotoBook and PhotoBook of the Year. Mário Pedrosa Award, Associação Brasileira de Críticos de Arte – ABCA 2008. Porto Seguro Photography Award 2008. Jabuti Award, 2004. Marc Ferrez Photography Award (IBAC/FUNARTE), 1992.
- Website: http://www.rosangelarenno.com.br/

Rosângela Rennó Gomes (Belo Horizonte, MG, 1962) is a Brazilian artist who lives and works in Rio de Janeiro. Her work consists of photographic images from public and private archives that question the nature of an image and its symbolic value. With the use of photographs, installations and objects, she appropriates and sheds new light on an anonymous body of photographs and negatives found mostly in flea markets, family albums, newspapers and archives. Rennó's interest in discarded images and habit of collecting were decisive in establishing her work strategies.

Rennó aims to generate interest in what she calls “the little stories of the downtrodden and the vanquished” (Rennó, 2004). These stories include the “inglorious” episodes of history, the shameful events of the past that successive Brazilian political regimes would like to gloss over, which she says can be found or uncovered in the “lowest categories of the image”: vernacular photography, identification shots, portraits. Rennó does not take photographs herself instead she recycles existing photographs of this kind.Rennó's decision to recycle photographs is influenced by the ideas of Czech photo-theorist Vilém Flusser who lived for many years in Brazil as well as the German photographer and theorist, Andreas Muller Pohle. In particular, Muller Pohl's idea of ‘an ecology of images’ informs Renno's practice of conserving and recycling images that already exist.

== Life and career ==
=== Education ===
Rennó graduated with a bachelor's degree in architecture from the Federal University of Minas Gerais in 1986, and in Fine Arts by the Guignard School, in 1987.

She obtained her doctorate degree in 1997 from the University of São Paulo's School of Communication and Arts. Her thesis was an artist book based on her 1996 series, Scar (Cicatriz) of reproductions of photographic negatives from the archives of the São Paulo Penitentiary Museum.

=== Artistic career ===
Rosângela Rennó began her artistic career in 1980. Her first group show was in 1985 at the IAB Gallery in Belo Horizonte, MG and her first solo exhibition, Anti-Cinema, was four years later, in 1989, at the Corpo Gallery also in Belo Horizonte. She soon obtained national and international recognition.

By the end of the 1980s, her work reflected the feminine and domestic universes, making use of family photos, reconstructing and remixing the artists' own memories.

When she began her graduate studies in 1988, she developed a photographic series based on discarded strips of negatives found near film editing studios on the University of São Paulo campus.

In 1989, Rennó moved from São Paulo to Rio de Janeiro and shifted her focus from the private/domestic sphere to the public sphere. She started working with negatives and forgotten photo identification images acquired from popular studios.

In the early 1990s, she started collecting and working with written descriptions of photographs instead of the actual images. Around this time Rennó also started using photographs found in public and private archives.

Rennó participated in multiple group and individual exhibitions, including two editions of the São Paulo Biennial in 1994 and 2010, two editions of the Mercosul Biennial (1997 and 2004), the Venice Biennale (1993), and the Havana Biennial in 1997. She received grants and fellowships from various cultural institutions, including the Centro Nacional de Pesquisa Tecnológica, in 1991; the Fundação Nacional de Artes, in 1992; Civitella Ranieri Foundation, in 1997; Vitae Foundation, in 1998, and the Guggenheim, in 1999.

==== Curatorship ====
Rennó joined the curatorial team of the Museum of Art of São Paulo in 2014, organizing an exhibition about the Foto Cine Clube Bandeirante in 2016. As of that year, her contract has not been renewed.

== Selected works ==
=== Universal Archive ===
Universal Archive (Arquivo Universal) (1992-) is a work in progress made up of written descriptions of photographs from newspaper articles. The artists characterizes the work as "images without images", and has used it as the basis of multiple series.

=== 2005-510117385-5 and A01 [cod. 19.1.1.43] - A27 [s|cod.23] ===
2005–510117385–5 and A01 [cod.19.1.1.43] — A27 [s|cod.23] are the first and second iterations in a series of artist books about the theft of historic photography collections from Brazilian public archives.

The title of 2005–510117385–5 (published in 2010) comes from the criminal inquiry number corresponding to the 2005 theft of 946 works, including 751 photographs, from the Aloísio Magalhães Room of the Brazilian National Library. The book is composed of life-size reproductions of the verso of the 101 photographs that were recovered.

A01 [cod.19.1.1.43] — A27 [s|cod.23], published in 2013, documents the empty interiors of the archival photo storage boxes after the theft of more than half of the photographic albums by Augusto Malta at the Archives of the City of Rio de Janeiro. The title is a reference to the classification of the albums in the archive.

== Collections ==
=== In Brazil ===
- Joaquim Nabuco Foundation, Recife, Brasil
- Museum of Modern Art Aloisio Magalhães (MAMAM), Recife, Brasil
- Museum of Art of Brasília, Brasília, Brasil
- Museum of Art of Pampulha, Belo Horizonte, Brasil
- Inhotim Institute, Inhotim, Brasil
- Museum of Modern Art of Rio de Janeiro (MAM RJ), Gilberto Chateuabriand Collection, Rio de Janeiro, Brasil
- Museum of Modern Art of São Paulo (MAM SP), São Paulo, Brasil
- Pinacoteca do Estado de São Paulo, São Paulo, Brasil
- Museum of Art of São Paulo (MASP), Pirelli Collection, São Paulo, Brasil

=== International ===
- Centre Georges Pompidou, Paris, France
- Tate Modern, London, England
- Culturgest, Lisbon, Portugal
- Fundação Caloustre Gulbenkian, Lisboa, Portugal
- Centro Galego de Arte Contemporáneo (CGAC), Santiago de Compostela, Spain
- Museo Nacional Centro de Arte Reina Sofia, Madrid, Spain
- Museo de Arte Contemporáneo de Castilla y León (MUSAC) Castilla y León, Espanha
- Museo de Cáceres, Cáceres, Spain
- Museo Extremeño e Iberoamericano de Arte Contemporáneo (MEIAC), Badajoz, Spain
- Stedelijk Museum voor Actuele Kunst (SMAK), Gent, Belgium
- Fondazioni Cassa de Risparmo de Modena, Italy
- Daros Latinamerica, Zurich, Switzerland
- Museum of Moderna Art (MOMA), New York, US
- Art Institute of Chicago, Chicago, US
- Latino Museum, Los Angeles, US
- Museum of Contemporary Art (MOCA), Los Angeles, US
- Orange County Museum of Art, Newport Beach, US
- Guggenheim Museum, New York, US
- Western Sydney University, Australia
