= Jose Emilio Fuentes Fonseca =

Cuban artist

Jose Emilio Fuentes Fonseca (JEFF)
- Born: 1974 (age 51–52); Cuba
- Movement: Outsider Artist

Jose Emilio Fuentes Fonseca (JEFF) is an artist who was born in Cuba in 1974. He came to live in Havana at 7 years old. He is frequently referred to as a "Naïve" or "Outsider" artist, since he principally works on themes such as childhood and childishness with a visible passion for toys and children’s art.

== Life and career ==
Jeff was raised by his grandparents and spent his childhood separated from his parents in Oriente Province. When he was 9 years old, his brother found a stick of dynamite and brought it home. Jeff lost 3 fingers. Jeff’s experience has influenced his art. Sailboats made of jagged, rusty metal, or wooden trains transporting severed limbs are some of the toys he created.

JEFF began studying art at age 13. When he was age 21, got a grant from the Ludwig Foundation of Cuba (LFC) to produce his Landscape at 21 installations. In 1994, his first solo exhibition at Havana’s Museo Municipal de Alquízar Álvaro Reinoso Valdez with El Rostro Innocente (in English: The Innocent Face) he received his first recognition as a significant artist. El Rostro Innocente installation featured a classroom full of broken chairs in which on the back of each chair was a pair of lead wings and paintings of fetuses with congenital birth defects covered the classroom walls.

JEFF was a guest artist of the Havana Biennial from March 27 to April 30, 2009. He created a herd of 12 metal elephants, which he moved from place to place throughout the city during the night.

== Awards and recognition ==
Year	Awards
1993	"Mencion en el Salon Prov. Eduardo Abela"
1996	Ludwig Foundation of Cuba (LFC) prize
1999	"A.H.S Antonia Eiriz’s prize"
2000	"La curaduria a la mejor curaduria del año" for "Con un pesar abstraido"

== Collective exhibitions ==
Year	Exhibitions
1993	"Salon Provincial Aristides Fernandez Güines"
1994	"ENA una vez" (IV Bienal de La Habana)
1995	"Molino rojo"
1996	"Espuelas afiladas"
1998	"Festival del Performance Ana Mendieta"
1999	"La Epoca" "Con un mirar abstraido" "Pintura"
2000	"Con un pensar abstraido" "Lo que se sabe no se pregunta" "Intercambio sin ser conocido" "VII Bienal de la Habana"
2001	"Intercambio sin ser conocido"
2002	"De tal palo tal astilla"

== Solo exhibitions ==
Year	Exhibitions
1994	"El Rostro Inocente" (The Innocent Face)
1996	"Paisaje a los 21 anos" (Landscape at 21)
1997	Performance "La zorra y el cuervo"
1998	"Cuidado con el niño"
2000	"Mama soy yo!"
2001	"Mucha Suerte"
