= Duvier del Dago Fernandez =

Cuban artist (born 1976)

Duvier del Dago Fernandez (born 1976) is a Cuban visual artist. He is from Zulueta, in the central Cuban province of Villa Clara. He was a student of the famous contemporary artist René Francisco Rodriguez at Havana’s Cuban Institute of Art. He also participated in two Havana Biennial exhibitions (in 2000 and 2006).

== Biography ==
Passionate with drawings, Duvier del Dago Fernandez entered the art school of Trinidad, before graduating from the prestigious Instituto Superior de Arte (ISA) in Havana.

The first project he participated in was the DUPP Gallery, with his professor René Francisco Rodríguez.

From 1999 to 2002, Duvier del Dago Fernandez started to work with another artist, Omar Moreno. They worked together under the name of Omarito & Duvier, exhibiting in Cuba and abroad.

Duvier del Dago Fernandez started to make three-dimensional models of some of his drawings in order to make them look as real as possible. It was the genesis of his current creations.

== Installations ==
Duvier del Dago Fernandez’ installations usually start with small drawings on semi-transparent nylon. Then, without the use of any computer or 3-D program, he translates them into spatial objects. He creates a spatial 'connect the dots' system, using cotton thread and a series of hooks on wooden panels. This creates a visual effect that makes his creations look like holograms.

One of his first holograms was the Reproducer (2001). Then, he created a lot of similar installations: Castles in the Air (2004), Bungalow (his project for the 2006 Havana Biennial), The Strange Case of the Ideal Onlooker (2006) and Plastic Girl (2007) exhibited in Madrid.

In 2008, he organised a personal exhibition called “El salto” at the Nina Menocal Gallery situated in Mexico.
