= Yolanda Gutiérrez =

Mexican and German dancer and artist (born 1970)

- Born: 1970 (age 55–56); Mexico City, Mexico
- Education: National Autonomous University of Mexico
- Known for: Dancer, choreographer and installation artist
- Movement: Postcolonialism
- Website: https://www.yolandagutierrez.de/

Yolanda Gutiérrez (born 1970) is a Mexican and German dancer, choreographer and installation artist.

== Early life and education ==
Gutiérrez was born in 1970 in Mexico City, Mexico, and was raised in Cuernavaca, Mexico. She studied contemporary dance in Mexico City, achieving a degree from the National School of Visual Arts at National Autonomous University of Mexico (MUAC). She also studied New Dance and Performance in Hanover, Germany. She lives in Hamburg, Germany.

== Career ==
In 1993, Gutiérrez won the Jóvenes Creadores fellowship from Mexico's National Fund for Culture and the Arts in the category of sculpture. She exhibited at the 5th Havana Biennial in Havana, Cuba in 1994.

In 2004, Gutiérrez participated in the exhibition El Arte de América Latina en la Transición al Siglo XXI (Latin American Art in the Transition to the Twenty-First Century) in Santiago, Chile.

In 2015, Gutiérrez worked on the community project "Recrea Xonacayucan," which focused on creating ecological artworks at San Felipe Xonacayucan Park in Atlixco, Mexico, with 200 local public school children. The project was funded by the National Fund for Culture and the Arts (Fonca) of Conaculta. Following this project, she was invited to exhibit an installation at the Royal Botanical Garden in Hamilton, Canada, during the 2015 Pan American Games.

Gutiérrez has studied Mayan herbalism with traditional doctor Mario Euan. They collaborated in the creation of a botanical garden in Xul, Yucatan, Mexico. She also studied organic farming at the Uyiíts Kaán peasant school in Mani, Yucatan, Mexico.

Gutiérrez is an artist fellow of the Käte Hamburger Research Centre global dis:connect. She is the founder and curator of the artistic collective Bismarck Dekolonial, which invites artists from the former German colonies of Namibia, Cameroon, Togo, Rwanda and Tanzania to perform in Hamburg at historical sites linked to Germany's colonial past. She was invited to the Netherlands to create a postcolonial city walk through Amsterdam. She also choreographed the Urban Bodies project in Munich, Germany, through her artistic platform Shape the Future.

Gutiérrez's installation art works have been exhibited at Museo Universitario Contemporáneo de Arte (MUAC) in Mexico City, Mexico, the World Bank in Washington D.C., United States, and the Universidad Politécnica de Valencia in Valencia, Spain.
