= Sergio Castiglione =

Argentine photographer

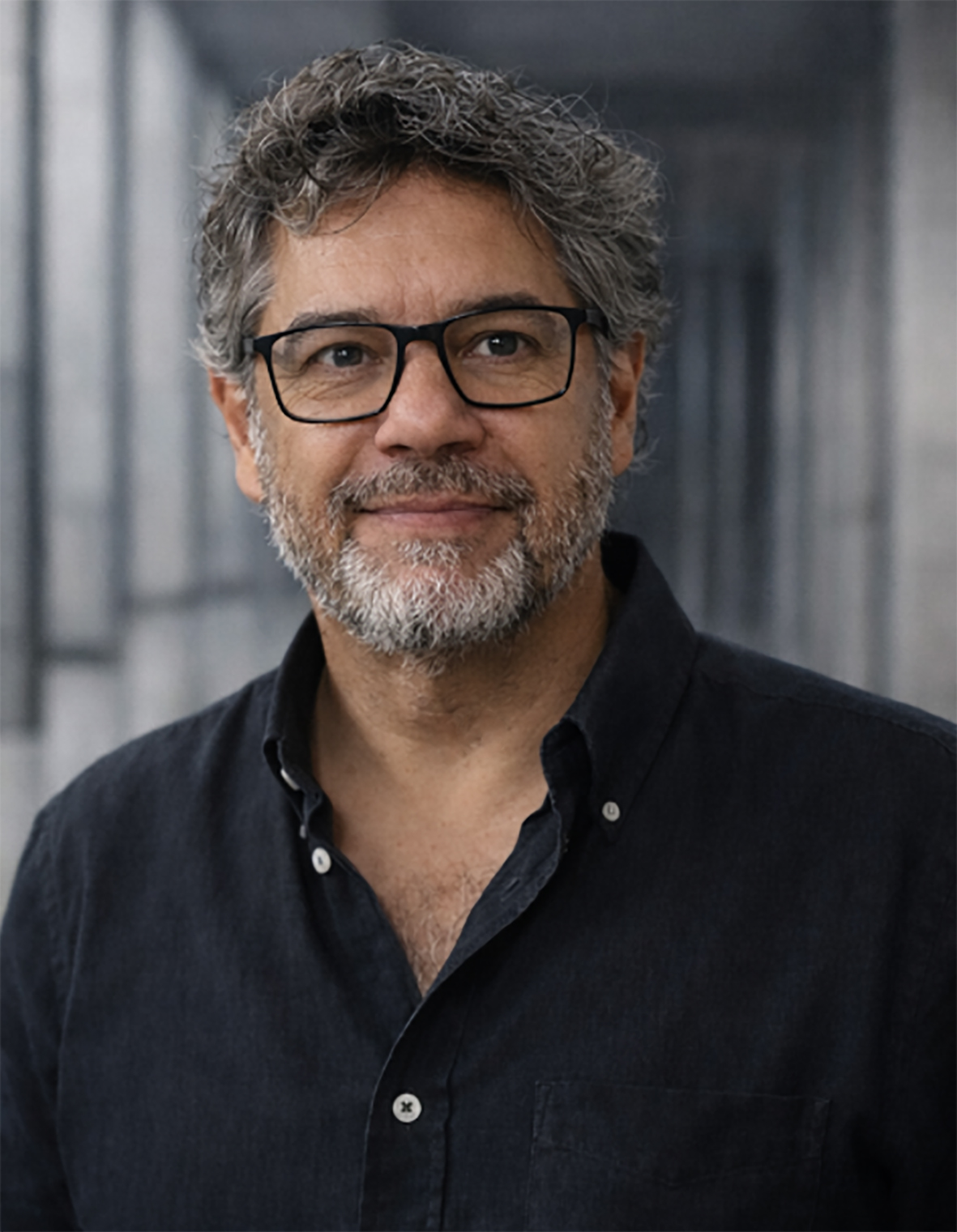
- Born: 1965 (age 60–61); Buenos Aires, Argentina
- Occupation: Photographer

Sergio Castiglione (born 1965) is an Argentine architect and photographer whose work focuses on urban landscape, architecture, travel, and the representation of time in contemporary cities. He has exhibited his work in Argentina and internationally.

== Biography ==
Sergio Castiglione was born in Buenos Aires, Argentina. He participated in a large number of activities related to creative art and culture. While at the University of Buenos Aires, he was assistant curator for the exhibition of the 50th anniversary of the National Academy of Fine Arts (MNBA) (1985) and, later on, assistant curator of the Palanza Award (1986), working for architect Alberto Bellucci in both cases. As architecture reporter Castiglione wrote for El Cronista, La Nación, Summa magazine, and D&D (1986–1990), among others, and was appointed correspondent in Europe and the USA as member of a team led by Carlos L. Dibar. Between 1993 and 1999 Sergio Castiglione served as publisher of Arquis, University of Palermo's School of Architecture news magazine, and some issues of Casas magazine. He was also co-author of a book called Estancias Argentinas (1996) published with Hernán Barbero Sarzábal. In 1997, Sergio Castiglione was curator of the exhibition "Madera, Acero y Piedra – Arquitectura y Diseño Finlandés de los 90" ("Wood, Steel and Stone – Finnish Architecture and Design of the 90s") opened at the MNBA by the President of Finland, Martti Ahtisaari, during an official visit to Argentina.

Presently, Castiglione practices equally as photographer and architect and participates in real estate developments. Since 1990 he has lived in Italy, Malta and the USA. He visited over two hundred cities all over the world documenting constructions and city landmarks. He currently lives and works in Buenos Aires.

== Education ==
Sergio Castiglione received his degree in architecture from the Faculty of Architecture, Design and Urbanism, University of Buenos Aires (1989); his M.Arch. in Architecture from Syracuse University, New York, USA (1993); and his MBA in Construction and Real Estate from the Pontifical Catholic University of Argentina/Technical University of Madrid (1996). In the field of photography, Mr. Castiglione participated in different courses, seminars and clinics on works of artists at Temple University, Philadelphia, USA, Andy Goldstein Photo School, Buenos Aires, as well as with Rodolfo Lozano, Miguel Zurraco, Grace Bayala and Fabiana Barreda.

== Still photography series ==
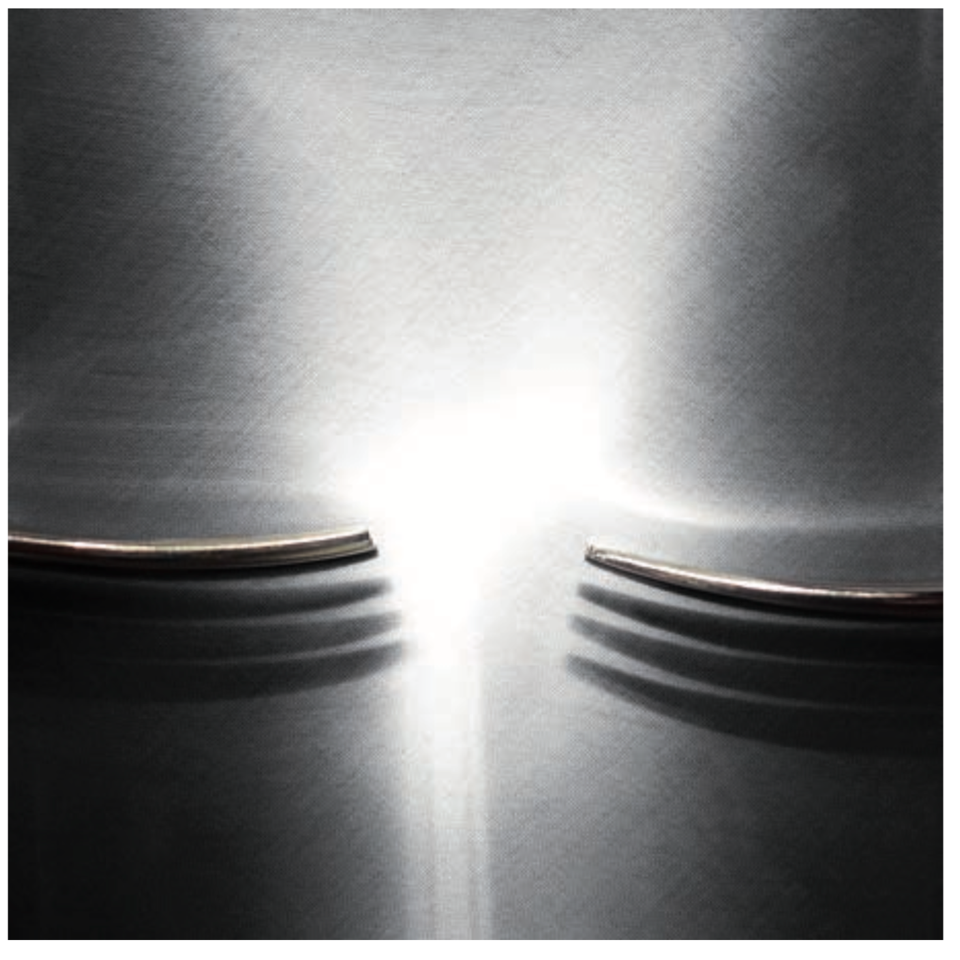
Simple but Complex Connections

=== Simples Relaciones Complejas ===
Simples Relaciones Complejas (Simple but Complex Connections) of 2012 is where he discards his characteristic urban landscape. This study was shot in the intimacy of his home using everyday utensils such as a fork, a knife and a spoon on a white tablecloth. He peruses the existential condition through an intense description of human relationships in today's world.

Right up front, this series looks like a black and white photo study; however, these are color photographs of practically single-color objects. Looking up close, color can be discovered in sparkling lights and reflections of the sky on the silverware.

Simples Relaciones Complejas was exhibited in several art centers including Art Hotel, Buenos Aires (2012), Consigo Art gallery, San Pablo (2013) and Centro Cultural Recoleta, Buenos Aires (2015).

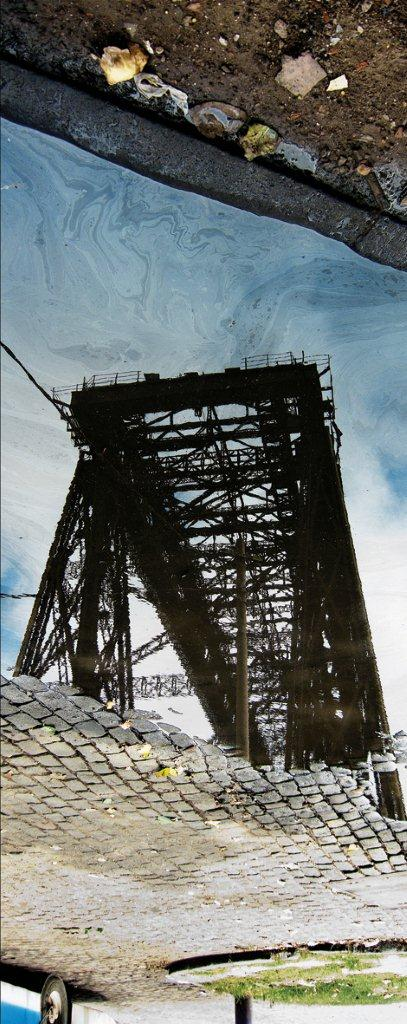
District 04: La Boca

=== Segments (2013–present) ===
Segments is an ongoing photographic series begun in 2013. Each image is composed from segmented shots captured at different moments from a fixed vantage point, creating a visual record of how light and time transform the built environment. As of 2026, the series spans nearly 70 cities in over 30 countries. In Fall 2026, Oscar Riera Ojeda Publishers will release Segments: Cities in Time, Light and Motion (ISBN 978-1-946226-85-3), a 180-page hardcover monograph with texts by Alejandro G. Roemmers, Victor Deupi, and Fabiana Barreda.

=== Espejos Urbanos – Otra forma de mirar Buenos Aires ===
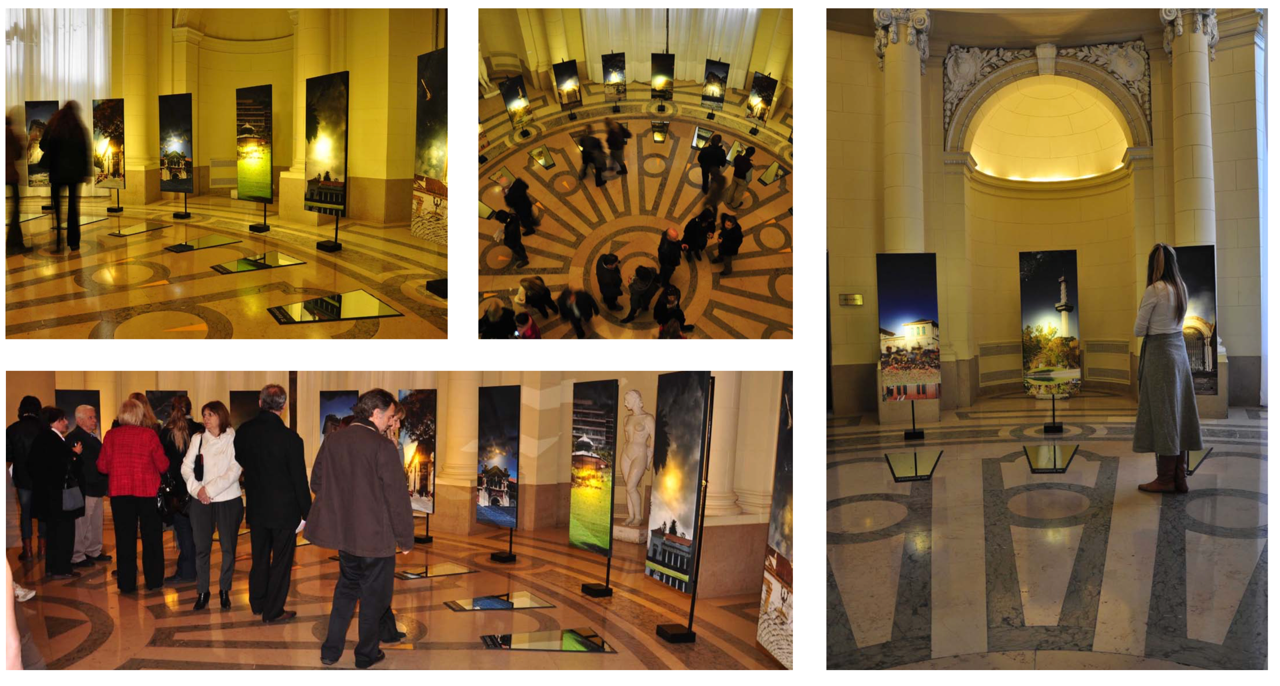
Urban Mirrors

One of Castiglione’s photographic series, Espejos Urbanos – Otra forma de mirar Buenos Aires (Urban Mirrors, a different way to see Buenos Aires) comprises works which are a singular tour along the architectural landmarks of the fifteen districts of the city of Buenos Aires. The author decided to capture buildings, bridges and monuments through their reflections on water, ponds, fountains or just puddles. The stated intent behind this series is to provide an alternative view of Buenos Aires in order to highlight often overlooked views and events, as well as to encourage preservation of the unique character of the city.

First exhibited in the Honor Hall at the Legislative Palace of the city of Buenos Aires (2012), the photographs toured the city along places such as the Museum of Architecture and Centro Cultural Recoleta (2013). In 2014 the exhibition visited several museums and art galleries in Rio de Janeiro, Porto Alegre and Florianopolis in Brazil. In 2015 it was displayed in New York and Atlanta in the USA and 2016 was the turn of Miami, USA and Milan, Italy.

In 2015 a book named after the exhibition was published with the fifteen works together with short descriptions of the architectural sites selected. The reviews were written by Luis Grossman, Carlos Dibar, Fabiana Barreda and Grace Bayala. Antefixa Ediciones was in charge of publishing this book under the Patronage Law of the Government of the city of Buenos Aires.

== Exhibitions ==
- Argentina – Art Hotel; El Baldío Móvil Art Center (2011); Legislature Building of the city of Buenos Aires; Fundación Ctibor of the city of La Plata; District 2 – Recoleta; Open Office (2012); MARQ, Buenos Aires Architecture and Design Museum of Buenos Aires; El Cubo Art Center; Centro Cultural Recoleta; Live In; Fundación Cherry Breitman (2013); Hit 1 Art Center; El Ojo Errante Art Club; Hopening Art Fair; Art Hotel; Plaza Castelli (2014); Centro Cultural Recoleta, Cassará Art Center (2015); Arte Espacio San Isidro, Buenos Aires Stock Exchange Building, Art Galleries from districts 4 and 13, Buenos Aires, Architecture Association art gallery (2016).
- Brazil – Consigo Art Gallery, San Pablo (2013), Museo de la Imagen y Sonido of Santa Catarina, Florianopolis, Communications Museum, Porto Alegre, Antonio Berni Art Gallery, Rio de Janeiro, (2014).
- Italy – Palazzo Ducale, Lucca, (2014); Palazzo Orlando, Livorno and M.A.C, Milan (2016)
- United Arab Emirates: 5th Ras Al Khaimah Fine Arts Festival, Ras Al Khaimah; World Art Dubai, Dubai (2017).
- USA – (e)merge Art Fair, Washington DC (2014); Consulate of Argentina in New York, Consulate of Argentina in Atlanta (2015); "Urban Mirrors" at Wynwood 28 Art Gallery, Miami (2016); Art Palm Beach, Palm Beach; Art Wynwood, Miami (2017); "Momentum: Intersections in Sports" at Embassy of Argentina in Washington (2019).

== Books and publications ==
=== Publications ===
- Estancias Argentinas
- Espejos Urbanos – Otra forma de mirar Buenos Aires
- Momentum – Intersecciones en el deporte
- Segments: Cities in Time, Light and Motion

== Awards ==
- Photo project Intersections, nominated a cultural work under the Law of Patronage of the Government of the city of Buenos Aires (2016).
- Espejos Urbanos – Otra forma de mirar Buenos Aires (Urban Mirrors, a different way to see Buenos Aires), a book declared of Cultural Interest by the Legislature of the city of Buenos Aires (2015)
- "Ventanas al Futuro de la Arquitectura 2014 a la Fotografía" ("Windows to the Future of Architecture 2014 to Photography") award sponsored by Parex Group and CAyC
- Espejos Urbanos – Otra forma de mirar Buenos Aires (Urban Mirrors, a different way to see Buenos Aires), a book nominated a cultural work under the Law of Patronage of the Government of the city of Buenos Aires (2014).
- Espejos Urbanos – Otra forma de mirar Buenos Aires (Urban Mirrors, a different way to see Buenos Aires), an exhibition declared Appreciated by the Legislature of the Government of the city of Buenos Aires (2013)
