= Carlos Garaicoa =

Cuban artist (born 1967)

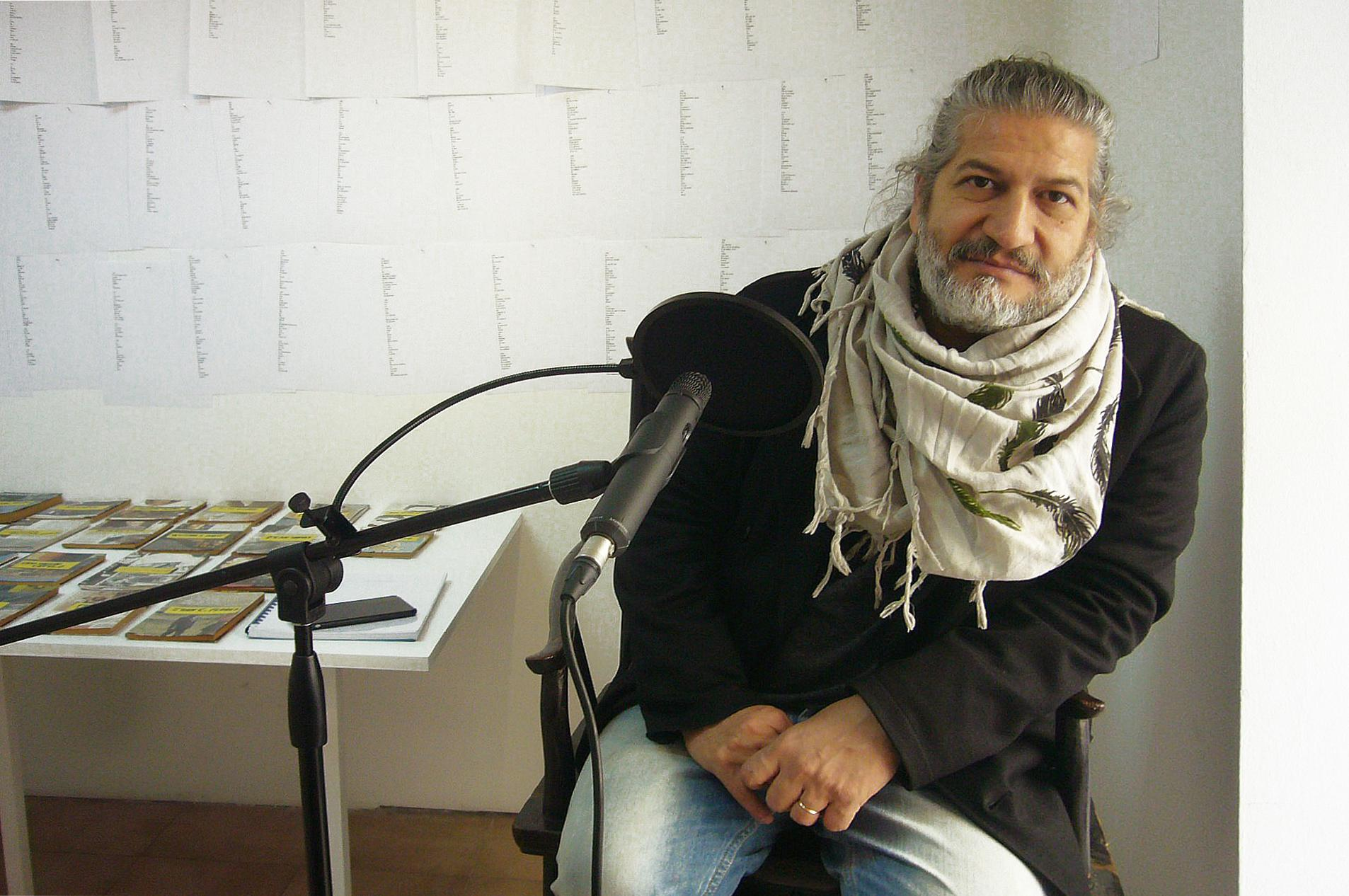
- Garaicoa in 2016
- Born: 1967 (age 57–58); Havana, Cuba
- Education: Instituto Superior de Arte
- Occupation: Contemporary artist

Carlos Garaicoa (born 1967) is a Cuban contemporary artist, specializing in photography and installations. Garaicoa became a prominent Cuban artist in the nineteen-nineties after a massive exodus of artists who had played a decisive role in the Cuban art movement of the nineteen-eighties. His pieces often carry social and political commentaries about life in Havana. Garaicoa's work is known to draw on post-modernist theory to connect aesthetics to meaning within urban spaces and architecture.

The Cuban artists of this time period included Alexandre Arrechea, Marcos Castillo and Dagoberto Rodríguez, Fernando Rodríguez, and Sandra Ramos. Theses artists are known for incorporating 'artisanal techniques' such as carpentry into their works. Garaicoa often analyzes and draws on architecture as an artisanal technique. Garaicoa along with the other artists of the time period were the first to emphasize using the city of Havana as a central space for their art.

== Early life ==
Born in Havana (Habana Vieja) in 1967, Carlos Garaicoa saw the effects of socialism on his neighborhood's development as he was growing up. During the Cold War and after the fall of European socialism, many buildings in Cuba remained unfinished, and modernization stagnated, leaving architecture in ruin and decay. As a teenager, although he was interested in architecture and art, he was formally trained in engineering and thermodynamics at the Vibora technical institute. After these studies, Garaicoa served four years of mandatory service in the Cuban army as a draughtsman, then enrolled in the painting department at el Instituto Superior de Arte (ISA) from 1989 to 1992. Due to the open nature of instruction at the ISA, he became interested in architecture within the context of art. Additionally, Garaicoa was interested in breaking down the strict definitions of literature, media, and art, and instead, using all three within his work. However, during his time in art school, Garaicoa was drafted back into the army but refused to re-enlist. Garaicoa was barred from presenting his thesis, and thus, never earned his degree from the ISA. He has since been offered an honorary degree, but refuses to accept it.

== Career ==
=== Early installations ===
Carlos Garaicoa began his career in the 1990s, as Cuba was thrust into economic depression by a lack of support from the USSR, combined with the US embargo. This was a difficult time for artists, but Garaicoa persevered by gaining international recognition through social commentary and political discourse in his art. In Carlos Garaicoa's earliest works, he did not focus on one medium due to his belief that it was too restricting, as well as his interest in the intersections of theory, reality, and art. To disrupt these barriers, as well as those between the artist and the spectator, Garaicoa's first pieces were anonymous installations placed in the street or alterations made to public spaces, like buildings and walls. Inspired by the international art circles of the 1950s and 1960s, Garaicoa titled these installations as "happenings," which relied on public engagement.

His first piece, Suceso en Aguiar 609 (Happening in Aguiar 609) (1990), took place in Garaicoa's apartment building in Havana when he sent notes to all of the residents with an ambiguous message that the building, and the residents' lives, would change. He then posted signs with information about the installation, added strips of nylon throughout the building to separate floors from one another, secretly took photos of his neighbors' reactions, and requested that residents deliver their opinions about the project. The thoughts he received were extremely diverse, with some spectators deeming it as art, and others writing it off as pointless and arbitrary. He remained anonymous the entire time and never revealed his intentions for the project.

As Garaicoa continued these happenings, he increasingly used photography in urban spaces. In his piece 39 (1991), Garaicoa fixed a wooden paddle with the number 39 to a column and hung a picture of the paddle with a list of possible explanations for the number, forcing spectators to question the relevance and importance of the message. In Homage to the Six (1992), Garaicoa installed a similar piece, with the number six written on a column without explanation, and took photos of passerby. He later developed prints of the photos he took at the installation site with the word "six" written in Spanish and a column painted at the bottom of the image. His documentation was meant to serve as a criticism of the tendency of society to process messages without challenging them, as so many people walked by without noticing the installation.

=== Exhibitions and notable pieces ===
==== Continuidad de una arquitectura ajena (Continuity of Somebody's Architecture) (2002) ====
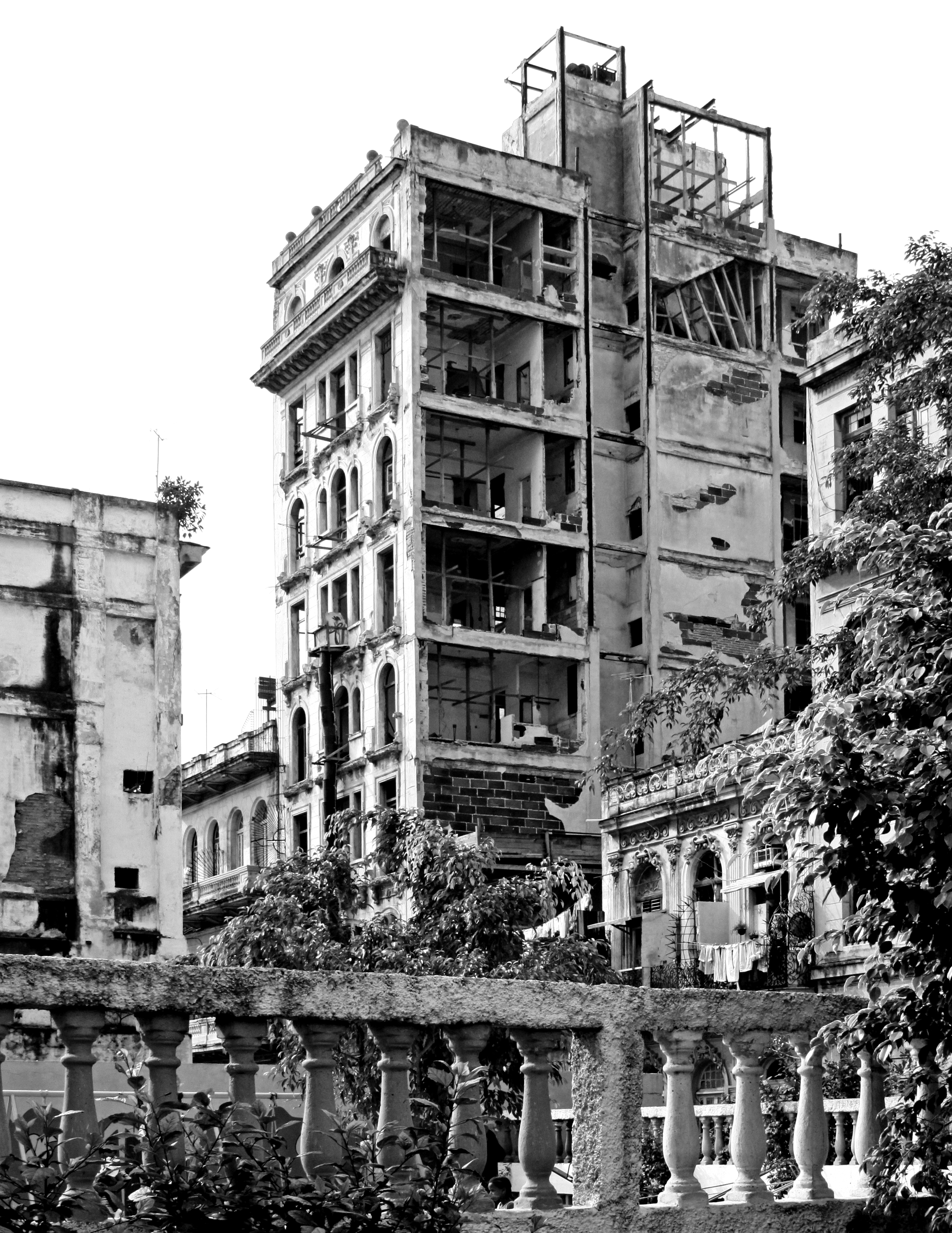
A decaying building in Havana, like those that Garaicoa documented for Continuity of Somebody's Architecture.

Continuity of Somebody's Architecture was an installation produced to be featured in an art show, Documenta 11, in Kassel, Germany. While all of pictures included Continuity of Somebody's Architecture were taken in Havana, they were produced in New York, which speaks to the universal scope of this piece. This work is critical of how architecture and construction reflect political projects. In Havana, Garaicoa personally witnessed the many architectural projects that were abandoned after the collapse of socialism, which left colonial ruins to coexist with the ruins of the 20th century. This historical moment is what inspired Garaicoa to come up with the name, Continuity of Somebody's Architecture, because the buildings were abandoned in the middle of construction, and his installation completes these projects. Garaicoa heavily researched each Microbrigade building he documented, finding the original architectural plans, to discover what was intended. He then worked with professionals to build maquettes of the ideal, finished building and displayed them against photographs of the actual structures. The images of incomplete, crumbling buildings, therefore, symbolize the decay of Utopian dreams, such as communism, while the multimedia elements represent the reconstruction of new social aspirations.

==== La Internacional (The International) (2005) ====
In 2005, Garaicoa produced a series of large scale black and white photographs of stores and restaurants that capture the nature of Havana's consumerist past and present. The shops in the images are juxtaposed against the lives of the less fortunate. These photographs have become a staple of Garaicoa's work, representing his artistic style and political critique of poverty and capitalism in Cuba.

La Internacional is representative of Garaicoa's style from this time, as it features a black and white photograph with a building named "La Internacional" overlaid with yellow and white thread. With strategic pin placement, the store name becomes intertwined with Garaicoa's words to form a message in Spanish: "La Internacional. Arriba, Abajo, A un lado. Sin lugar, los pobres del mundo.” This translates to: "The International. Up, Down, To the side. Without place, the poor of the world."

==== Overlapping (2010) ====
Overlapping was an exhibit by Carlos Garaicoa at the Irish Museum of Modern Art. The gallery of various art forms explores how architecture, politics, and culture intersect within Havana. In each piece, Garaicoa illustrates how political scars and complex landscapes are tied to one another. Garaicoa used an earlier series of photographs, taken in Havana, and overlaid them with drawings of unfinished buildings at the same sites. The pieces are meant to critique capitalist consumption and the incomplete socialist revolution of the 20th century.

Minimo is not Minimal (Los trucos de Mr. S. L.) (Minimo is not Minimal (Mr. S.L.'s tricks)) I, III, and IV (2010) are central to the exhibit. The pieces continue to draw upon themes explored by Garaicoa in the past. In Minimo is not Minimal, Garaicoa juxtaposes an idealized minimal structure with the broken I-beam found in Havana. The use of images from Havana, Beijing, and Shanghai show that Garaicoa believes there is a connection between modern sculptures and modern socialist states. Garaicoa highlights the erosion of political idealism through the ruin of modernist architecture.

Another piece in the exhibit, Ciudad doblada (roja) (Bend City (Red)) (2010), was an intricate sculpture made of 96 small, folded pieces of paper. Bridges, pyramids, buildings and arches pop up out of each red city-block. The sculpture forces the viewer to examine the difference between the individual structures and then the congregate of all of them, a model of how socialism is an overarching structure composed of individuals

==== Yo nunca he sido surrealista hasta el día de hoy (2017) ====
Carlos Garaicoa's Yo nunca he sido surrealista hasta el día de hoy (I've never been surrealist until today), was displayed at the Museum of Architecture, Art and Technology in Lisbon. The installation emphasizes the importance of rethinking one's position as a citizen, and questioning the current political and economic crises that are occurring within the urban landscape.

The model airplane crashing into the tree is symbolic of humanity's relationship with conflict, the economy, and ecology. The plane shows the destructive impact humans have had on all of these. Garaicoa chose to reference Surrealism because of the movement's political background, and re-orientation of how society could relate to reality.

The exhibit examines geopolitics and reframes the relationship between center and periphery. Garaicoa believes that the center-periphery distinction is a question of perspective, and that in contemporary times there has been a power shift in which the visions, art, and culture of the periphery is becoming more prominent.

=== Cuban influence ===
Carlos Garaicoa has been influential in developing Cuba's art scene by drawing international and private sector attention to his work, and consequently, other artists on the island. The visibility of Cuban artwork has created more opportunities for Cuban artists to work abroad and learn from their experience. Garaicoa is passionate about creating a stable environment for artists and culture, rather than commercial interests, to thrive, and was involved in the opening of the Galleria Continua’s Havana space. The gallery represents one of the first institutions for Cuban artists to present their work that is not a touring exhibit. In 2015, Carlos Garaicoa created the Artista x Artista program as another means to support the growth of Cuban art. Garaicoa provides international artists a grant to live in Havana for one month paid and in exchange, take young artists from Cuba abroad to develop new ideas, train, and share the art community beyond borders.

Garaicoa was also heavily influenced by the Cuban Revolution, and much of his work criticizes the duality between communism and over-consumption in Cuba, especially within architecture. However, his pieces are often abstract or minimal, with little or no explanation of their purpose, in order to force viewers to construct their own meaning and think critically about his art. His art has been featured in many prominent exhibitions at museums such as the Museum of Contemporary Art in Los Angeles, the Solomon R. Guggenheim Museum, the Tate Modern, and the Bronx Museum of the Arts.
