= Steven Aalders =

Dutch artist

- Born: 4 July 1959 (age 67); Middelburg, Netherlands

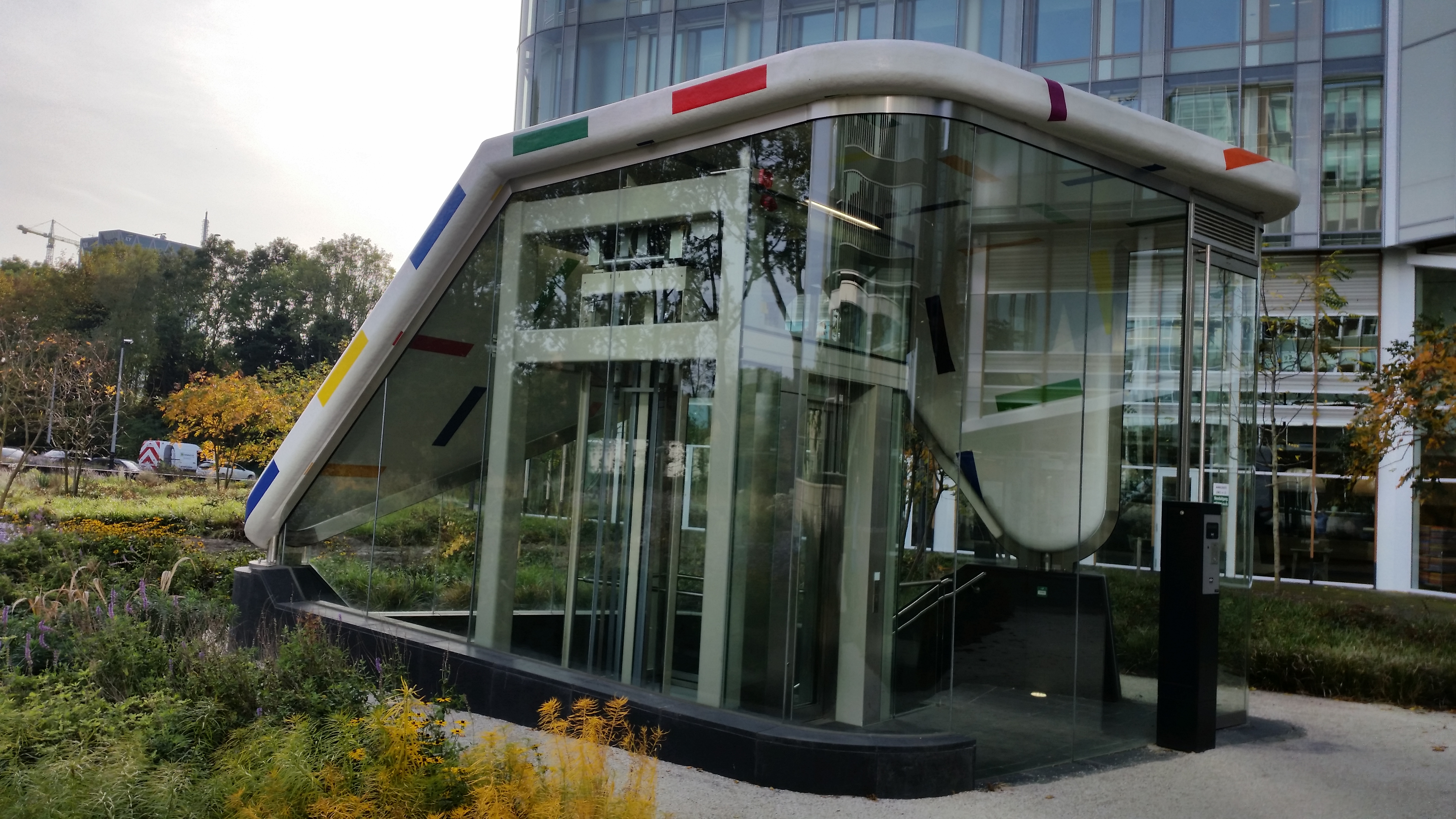
A work of art by Steven Aalders forms the roof of an elevator shaft to the underground parking of Stibbe

Steven Aalders (born 4 July 1959) is an abstract artist, known for his minimal geometric oil paintings.

== Biography ==
Steven Aalders was born on 4 July 1959 in Middelburg, in the Netherlands, and grew up in Amsterdam. He studied at the Gerrit Rietveld Academy in Amsterdam (1979-1982), Croydon College of Art in London (1982-1983) and Ateliers 63 in Haarlem (1983-1985). After winning the Royal Award in Painting in 1986 he worked in Barcelona for a year. In 2011 he undertook a residency at the Josef Albers Foundation in Bethany, Connecticut and in 2017 at the Van Doesburghuis in Meudon, Paris.

Aalders lives and works in Amsterdam.

== Exhibitions ==
Aalders had his first gallery solo show at Jurka Gallery in Amsterdam in 1987, and has exhibited regularly since then, particularly at the Slewe Gallery in Amsterdam. In 2002 he had his first single artist exhibition at a museum, entitled Vertical Thoughts at the Stedelijk Museum voor Aktuele Kunst in Ghent, Belgium. In 2010 followed his exhibition Cardinal Points at the Kunstmuseum Den Haag (formerly known as the Gemeentemuseum, The Hague). Parallel to this exhibition he published his book Cardinal Points, which presented an overview of more than fifteen years of work, with essays by Rudi Fuchs, Thomas Lange and Aalders himself. In 2020 he made an installation at the Van Gogh Museum in Amsterdam, in which he referred to Van Gogh's painting Harvest. In 2021/2022, his exhibition 'Seasons' was on view at the Kröller-Müller Museum, on which occasion a catalogue is published in collaboration with Hatje Cantz, with an overview of ten years work. In 2017 the book The Fifth Line. Thoughts a Painter, was published by Koenig Books, in which Aalders' thoughts on art and particularly abstract art and its relation to the world are discussed in a series of interviews.

== Work ==
Aalders makes abstract oil paintings, influenced by the modernism of Mondrian and the American Minimal Art. His work is an attempt to embody the essence, to create light and space through paint. Also to remap the tradition of history of art. Modernist serial principles such as repetition and uniformity are linked to age-old concepts of depicting time and place. His use of colour reflects various colour concepts from the past. In his paintings he expresses the rhythm of life. In addition to his painting practice he has also written various texts on art and artists for newspapers, magazines and catalogues.

Aalders is represented by Slewe Gallery, Amsterdam and Walter Storms Galerie in Munich.

== Collections ==
His paintings have been collected internationally by both private and public collections, such as the Stedelijk Museum Amsterdam, Kröller-Müller Museum, Otterlo, Museum Voorlinden, Wassenaar, Museum Kurhaus Kleve, AkzoNobel Art Foundation, ABN AMRO Bank Art Collection, BPD Art Collection, Over Holland Art Collection, Thoma Art Collection, Chicago amongst others.

== Publications (selection) ==
2021: Steven Aalders, Seasons, Kröller-Müller Museum, Otterlo / Hatje Cantz, Berlin (texts: Rudi Fuchs and Steven Aalders; design: Irma Boom)

2017: Steven Aalders, The Fifth Line. Thoughts of a Painter, Koenig Books, London. (design: Irma Boom)

2010: Steven Aalders, Cardinal Points, Gemeentemuseum The Hague (texts: Benno Tempel, Rudi Fuchs, Thomas Lange and Steven Aalders; design: Irma Boom)

2009: Steven Aalders, Place (Black, Brown, Beige, Grey & Ash), Mondriaanhuis, Amersfoort, NL (design: Irma Boom)

2002: Steven Aalders, Vertical Thoughts, S.M.A.K., Ghent (texts: Jan Hoet, Pietje Tegenbosch; design: Irma Boom)

== Commissions ==
Aalders did several commissions. In collaboration with Reiach and Hall Architects in Edinburgh he designed an art work 'Frieze' for the Scottish National Blood Transfusion Service in Edinburgh and a design for the glass panels for the Nuclear Archive, Wick in Scotland in 2017. In collaboration with Group A, Rotterdam, Aalders made a design for the roof of the entrance parking lot Beatrixpark Beethovenstraat in 2016. In 2019 he made a pictorial installation at Huize Frankendael in Amsterdam.
