= Los Carpinteros =

Cuban art collective

- Formation: Havana, Cuba, 1992
- Region served: Worldwide
- Official language: Spanish

Los Carpinteros is a Cuban artist collective founded in Havana in 1992 by Marco Antonio Castillo Valdes, Dagoberto Rodriguez Sanchez, and Alexandre Arrechea (who left the group in 2003). In 1994 they decided "to renounce the notion of individual authorship and refer back to an older guild tradition of artisans and skilled laborers” in an attempt to emphasize their belief that art always, to some extent, involves collaboration. Both Valdes and Sanchez were born in Cuba and live and work between Havana and Madrid. They have exhibited in Cuba, Europe and North America, and have received a number of awards.

== Career ==
In their work the artists incorporate aspects of architecture, design and sculpture to create installations and drawings that “negotiate the space between the functional and the nonfunctional", where they derive their “inspiration from the physical world” and express their interest in the intersection of art and society in a humorous manner. Los Carpinteros create a response to places, spaces and objects, how they have been conceived, built, used and abandoned.

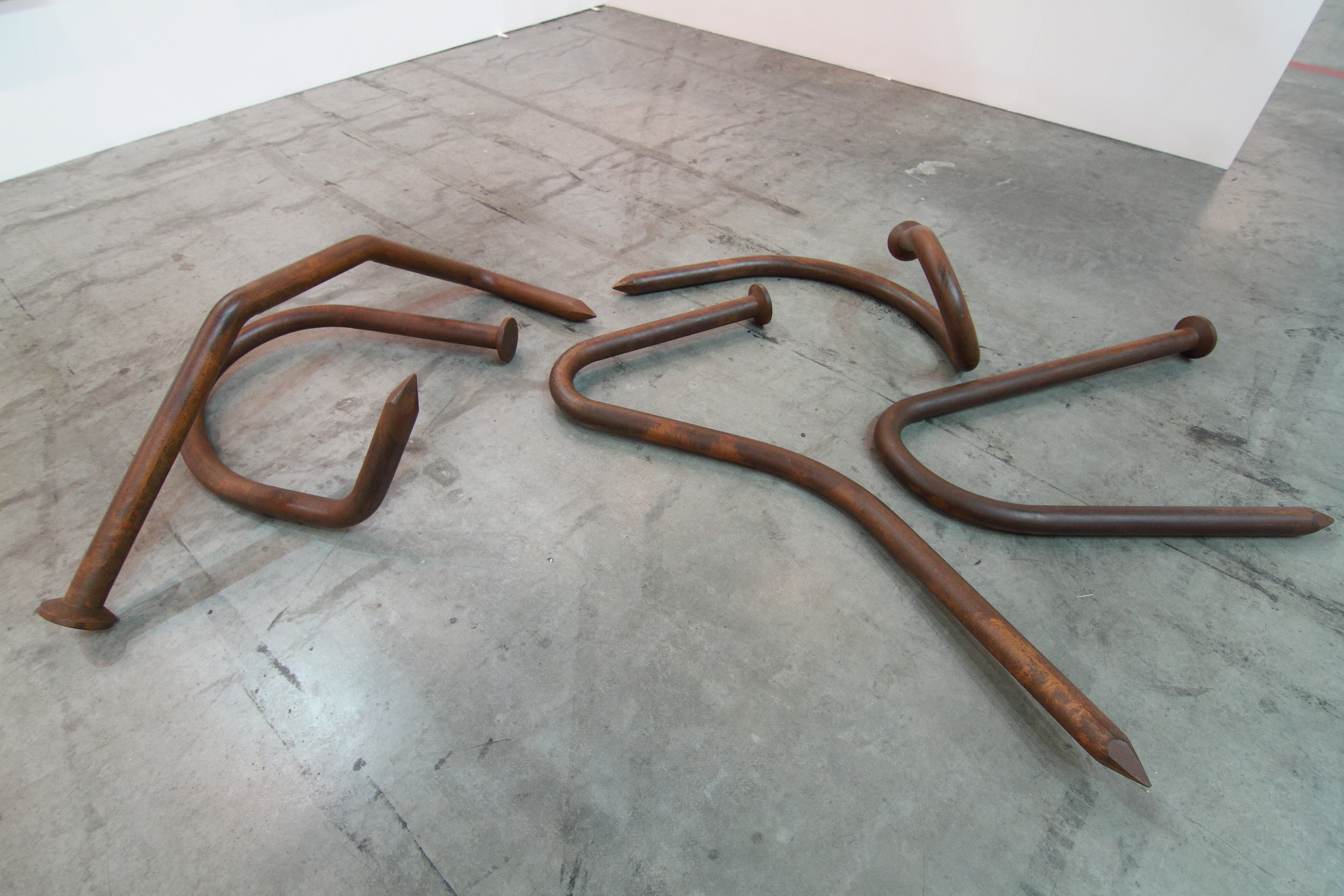
Los Carpinteros - Clavos Torcidos

Between personal exposures are those made in the 90s in the ' "Centro de Arte 23 y 12" Cuba. They have been exhibited at "The New Museum of Contemporary Art" and the "Contemporary Arts Center" in Cincinnati, Ohio; "Grant Selwyn Fine Arts" in Los Angeles, CA; at the International Contemporary Art Fair ARCO'98 in Madrid; and Art Basel Miami where for the 2012 edition of the fair they built the "Güiro Art Bar". They held their first solo exhibition in Asia, 'Heterotopias', at Edouard Malingue Gallery in 2013.

== Collections ==
Los Carpinteros works are included in the following permanent collections:

- Pérez Art Museum Miami, Florida
- Museum of Modern Art, New York
- Museum of Fine Arts, Houston
- Los Angeles County Museum of Art, California
- Tate Modern, London
- Reina Sofia Museum, Madrid
