= Alexandre Arrechea =

Cuban artist

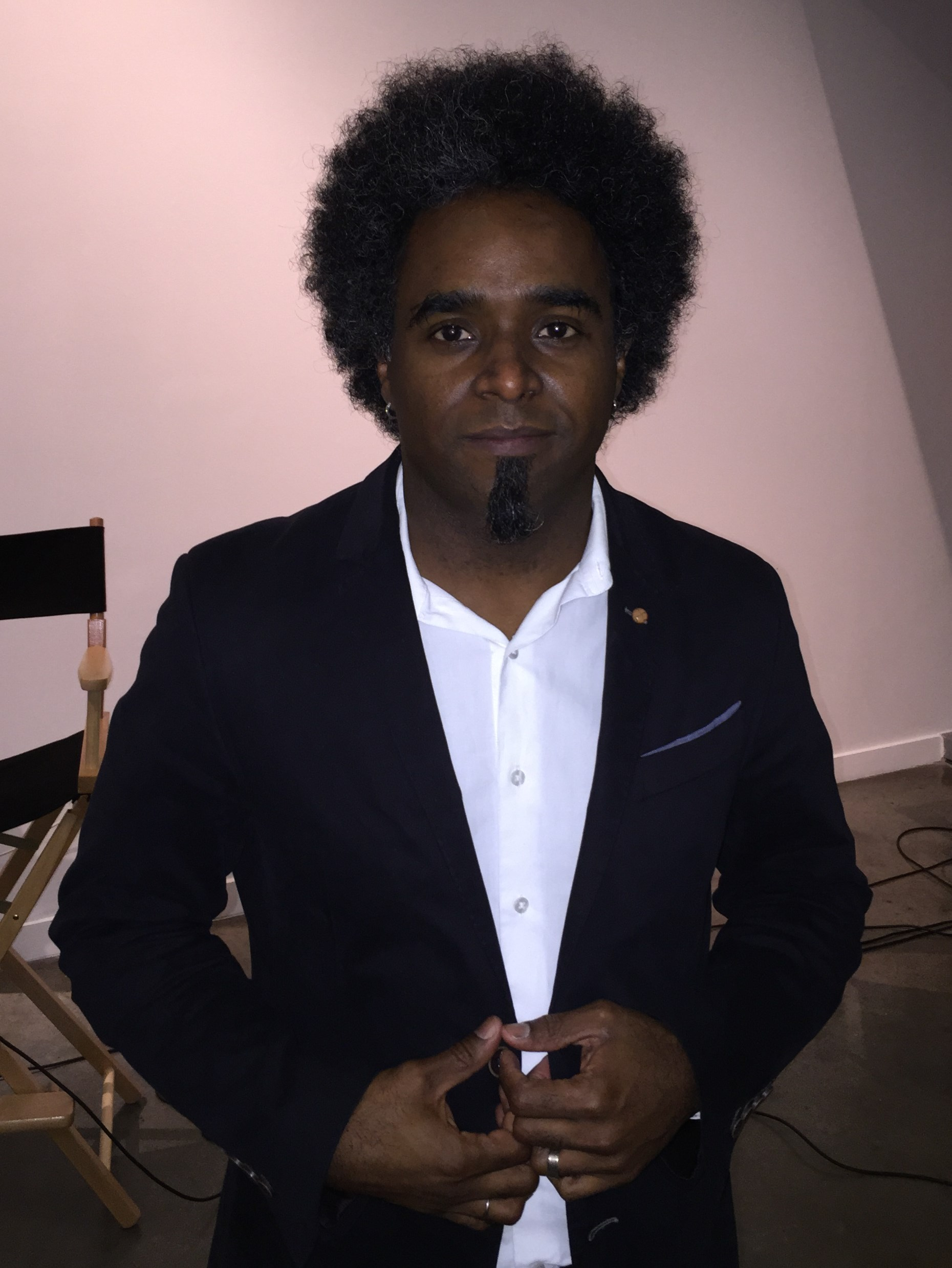
- Born: 1970 (age 55–56); Trinidad, Cuba
- Education: Instituto Superior de Arte, Havana
- Known for: Contemporary Art

Alexandre Arrechea (born 1970, Cuba) is a Cuban visual artist. His work is in the collections of the Museum of Modern Art New York (MoMA), New York, the Museum of Latin America Art (MOLAA), California, the Pérez Art Museum Miami, Florida, the Studio Museum in Harlem, New York, among others. Arrechea's work explores the themes of power and its associated networks of hierarchy, surveillance, control, prohibition, and subjugation. He lives between Madrid and Miami.

== Early life and education ==
Arrechea was born in Trinidad, Cuba in 1970. Arrechea graduated from the Instituto Superior de Arte (ISA) of Havana in 1994.

== Work ==
For twelve years, he was a member of the art collective Los Carpinteros, until he left the group in July 2003 to continue his career as a solo artist. His public art invites active spectator participation, which enhances the viewer's engagement and reflection. The work arises out of human actions and reactions in the face of contemporary versions of the worldview already described by Jeremy Bentham in the 18th century. The eye of power watches everything and everyone, and everyone watches everyone else and themselves.

For the 10th Havana Biennial (March 27 – April 30, 2009), Arrechea worked on a project named La habitación de todos (The Room of All), which is a sculpture of a house that expands or contracts according to, respectively, the rise or fall of the Dow Jones Industrial Average. More recently he has worked on a public art project in New York City, involving video projections on buildings. His work was showcased in the 2005 Venice Biennale.

The interdisciplinary quality of Arrechea's work reveals a profound interest in the exploration of both public and domestic spaces. This quest has led him to produce several monumental projects like “Ciudad Transportable” (2000), “The Garden of Mistrust” (2003-2005) and “Perpetual Free Entrance” (2006). Arrechea has been represented by the Casado Santapau Gallery in Madrid since 2006.

In 2026, Alexandre Arrechea's work was featured in the Get in the Game: Sports, Art, Culture, which traveled from the San Francisco Museum of Modern Art, California, to the Pérez Art Museum Miami, Florida.

== Los Carpinteros ==
Arrechea made his name thanks to the art collective Los Carpinteros, composed of Marco Antonio Castillo Valdés and Dagoberto Rodríguez Sánchez. The three artists began working behind their collective moniker back in 1994, and they became rapidly successful. The New York Museum of Modern Art acquired several of their drawings for the museum's permanent collection.

Arrechea decided to leave Los Carpinteros in July 2003, to begin a solo career. His first individual project was El Jardin de la Desconfianza (The Garden of Mistrust), an epic installation in Los Angeles that required two years of work (2003-2005). The central piece of the work was a whitewashed aluminum tree whose branches were outfitted with video cameras which recorded spectators and broadcast them on the Internet. His public art often involves concepts of power and its network of hierarchies, surveillance, control, prohibitions and subjection. The spectator's participation in the work adds to its contemplation.

== Personal life ==
He lives between Madrid and Miami, with his wife, Cuban art historian Marlene Barrios de Arrechea and their two children.
