= Havana Biennial =

Contemporary art exhibition in Cuba

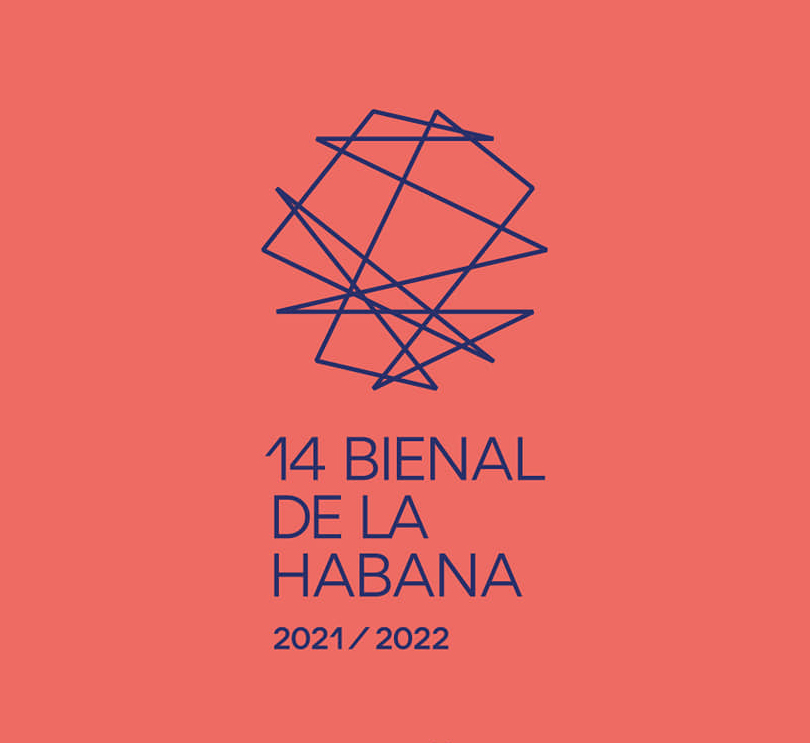
- Logo of 14th Bienal de La Habana since 2021
- Begins: 1984
- Frequency: Biennial, every two years
- Location: Havana, Cuba
- Country: Cuba
- Most recent: 2021-2022
- Next event: 2025
- Organiser: Centro de Arte Contemporáneo, Wifredo Lam
- Website: http://wlam.cult.cu

The Bienal de La Habana was a traditional Latin, Caribbean event, originated in Havana, Cuba, that aims to raise awareness to promote contemporary art and giving priority to Latin-American and Caribbean artists.

The event was founded in 1984. It takes place in Havana (Cuba) every two years. It principally aims at promoting the developing world in contemporary art circles, giving priority to Latin American and Caribbean artists, although artists from all over the world submit works.

Since its first edition in 1984, the Biennial event has had central themes, among them tradition and contemporary times, challenges, art, society and reflection, man and memory, life with art and urban life. Works emphasize mainly paintings and other two-dimensional displays, using a variety of techniques.

== History ==
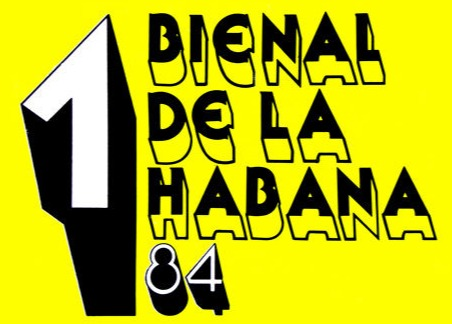
Logo of 1st Bienal De La Habana in 1984.

=== 1st Bienal de La Habana ===
First Chair of the Organizing Committee: Marcia Leiseca

The event was established in 1984. This edition exhibited artists only from Latin America and the Caribbean. It was attended by 800 artists from 22 countries, with the collaboration of numerous historians and critics from almost the entire continent of Latin América. The event focused on themes such as tradition and contemporaneity, challenges, art, society and reflection, man and his memory, art and urban life. The artists' works included a wide variety of techniques and trends such as photography, video art, installations and performances. It had a competition in the genres of painting, engraving, drawing and photography.

The Wifredo Lam Grand Prize was awarded to artist Arnold Belkin. Artists such as Carmelo Arden Quin, José Gamarra, Carlos Alonso, Horacio García Rossi, Adolfo Patiño, Ever Astudillo, Roberto Fabelo, Omar Rayo, León Ferrari, Fernell Franco and Tomás Sánchez participated.

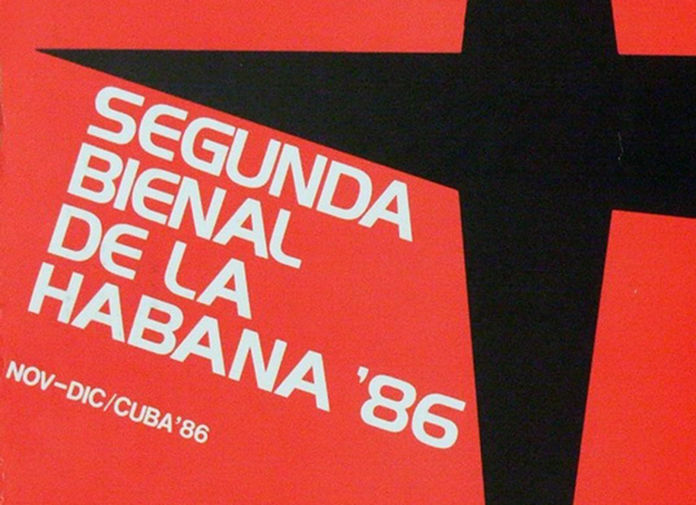
2nd Bienal de La Habana in 1986.

=== 2nd Bienal de La Habana ===
Director: Llilian Llanes

Held in 1986, it sought a broader curatorial work and extended its scope including the presence of artists from Africa, the Middle East and Asia. Some 700 artists from 56 countries participated. The main objective of this edition was to position the event in the Third World. It also consolidated itself as a meeting place for "non-Western" artists.

The artists awarded in this biennial were José Bedia Valdés, Carlos Capelán, Alberto Chissano, Jogen Chowdury, Joaquín Lavado (Quino), Lani Maestro, Manuel Mendive, Antonio Ole, Marta Palau, José Tola, and Juan Manuel Ugarte Eléspuru.

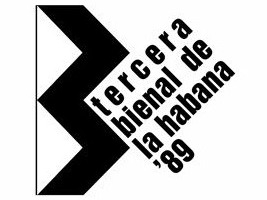
3rd Bienal de La Habana in 1989.

=== 3rd Bienal de La Habana ===
Subject: Tradition and Contemporaneity in the plastic arts and the Third World environment.

Director: Llilian Llanes

When the third edition of the event was held in 1989, it was decided to readjust the open character that characterized it in its foundational stage, implementing, from then on, a curatorial criterion under premises previously defined by the organizing team. After this date, the artists from different countries and geographical areas are expressly selected by the curators of the event, by virtue of the organic articulation of their work with the thesis being worked on each occasion. This Biennial proposed as part of its thesis the interrelations between the so-called high art and popular art.

Nearly 300 artists from 41 countries participated in the Biennial.

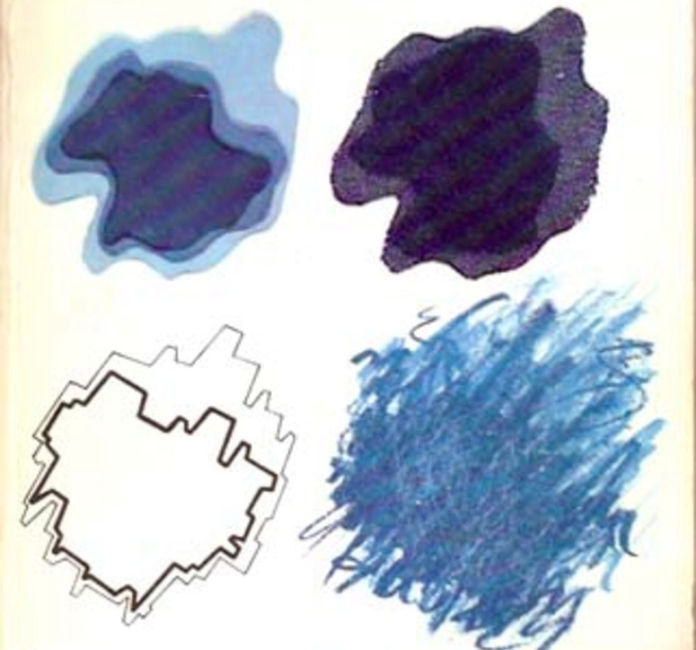

=== 4th Bienal de La Habana ===
Subject: Challenge to Colonization

Director: Llilian Llanes

Held in 1991, it served as an exceptional space for reflection on the meaning of colonization and neo-colonization, not only of the contents of our societies and cultures, but also of the languages and instruments used today. This Biennial was held in the context of the controversy generated by the celebration of the V Centenary of the Discovery of America.

Nearly 200 artists from 45 countries participated in the Biennial.

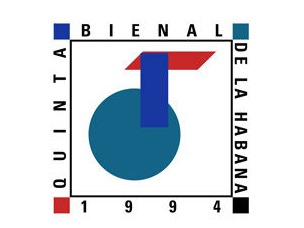

=== 5th Bienal de La Habana ===
Subject: Art, Society and Reflection

Director: Llilian Llanes

This edition of the Biennial, inaugurated in 1994, was intended to highlight the close links between artistic production and contextual conflicts, as a quality consubstantial to a whole area of contemporary art in our regions. Particular themes were worked on, such as: the physical and social environment; the different expressions of marginality and power relations in the sphere of art; the phenomenon of migrations and intercultural processes; the conflicts of human beings living in "the periphery of postmodernity"; and cultural appropriations and crossbreeding.

Nearly 200 artists from 43 countries participated in the event.

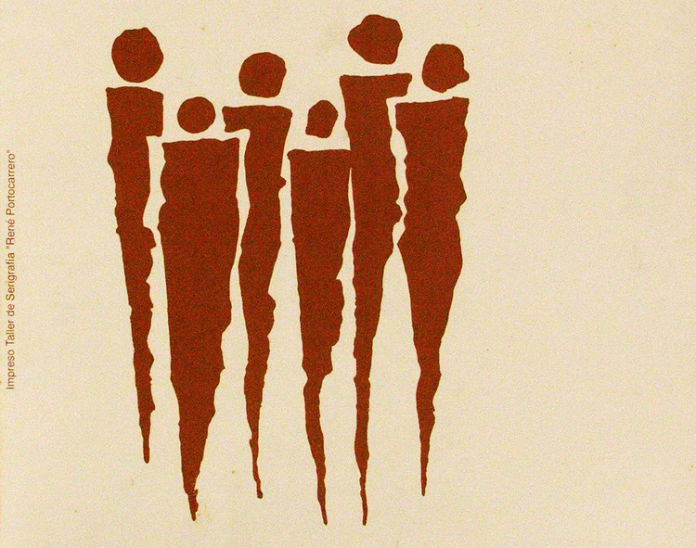

=== 6th Bienal de La Habana ===
Subject: The individual and his memory

Director: Llilian Llanes

This event, which took place in 1997, showed the work of a significant group of artists who had appealed to different registers of memory with the purpose of reaffirming their human and social condition. The crisis of ethical and spiritual values, as well as existential conflicts, were reflected in projects through the oversizing of the body and the use of objects that assume a symbolic connotation and reveal a sense of belonging or explain their evocative capacity.

It was attended by 170 artists from 41 countries.

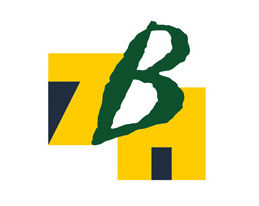

=== 7th Bienal de La Habana ===
Subject: One closer to the other

Director: Nelson Herrera Ysla

Held from November 2000 to January 2001. More than 171 artists from 43 different countries participated in this edition of the biennale, among them Nadín Ospina, Francis Alÿs, Susan Hiller, Julieta Aranda, Tania Bruguera, Diana Domingues, H Committee of Human Vindication, Jean-Pierre Raynaud, Rafael Lozano-Hemmer, Los Carpinteros, César Martínez Silva, Teresa Margolles, Miguel Calderon, Santiago Sierra, among others. Numerous events were held in various public places in the city exploring interpersonal relationships and modes of communication between human beings.

Their objective was to reflect on the impact of technological advances in the phenomenon of communication in different spheres, which have undoubtedly generated new individual and social behaviors, since the art system itself has been affected by this circumstance, given that new supports have appeared for the circulation of works, as well as for their commercialization. This has influenced the relationship between the artist and the public, the artist and the community, and the city, and has redefined the integration of art into the daily habitat.

Urban interventions were carried out in several sites in the historic zone of the capital and its modern zone through graphic mural projects and the realization of works in semi-abandoned spaces that allowed the participation of members of the community or neighborhood where they were carried out. Also, for the first time, an International Meeting of Art Students was held at the headquarters of the Higher Institute of Art of Havana.

==== Selected projects ====
- Helio Oiticica: Beyond Space, organized by the Fundaçao Memorial da América Latina and the Proyecto Hélio Oiticica.
- Jean-Michel Basquiat, at Casa de las Américas.
- La Gente en Casa (People at Home), Cuban Art from the sixties to the nineties, at Museo Nacional de Bellas Artes,.
- Extramuros - Actions and Performances, at various locations, November 17 and 18, 2000.

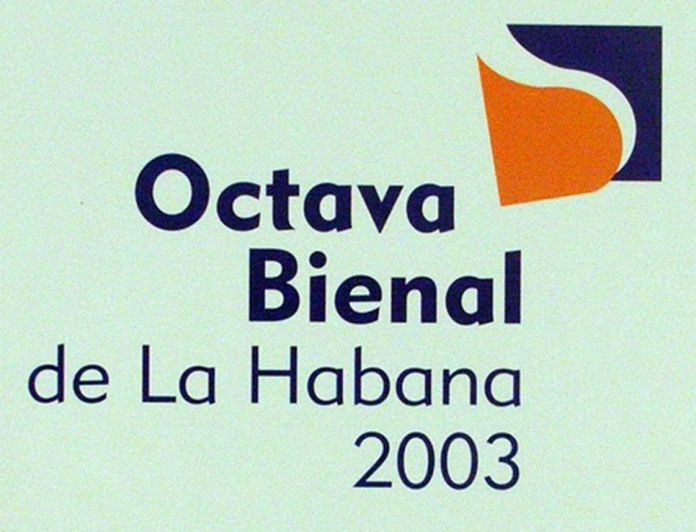

=== 8th Bienal de La Habana ===
Subject: Art with life

Director: Hilda María Rodríguez

The eighth edition of the Biennial was convened for the year 2003, under the spirit of Art with Life, to provoke reflections on daily life, its conflicts and bounties, the problems and semblances of our cities, the role of art in the territories of coexistence, in short, the possible relations between art and life, including all its possible fractures.

Lapses in the schedule were due to funding challenges. The 8th Biennial of 2002 was delayed an entire year, resuming in November 2003. This event showcased art within the social landscape, outside of traditional institutions. Artists normally unable or unwilling to participate with large institutions engaged diverse audiences by bringing art out of the museum and into the streets. Noteworthy artists to have "activated" the urban space include Mitchell Sipus and Fabiana de Barros.

It was attended by 150 artists from 48 countries.

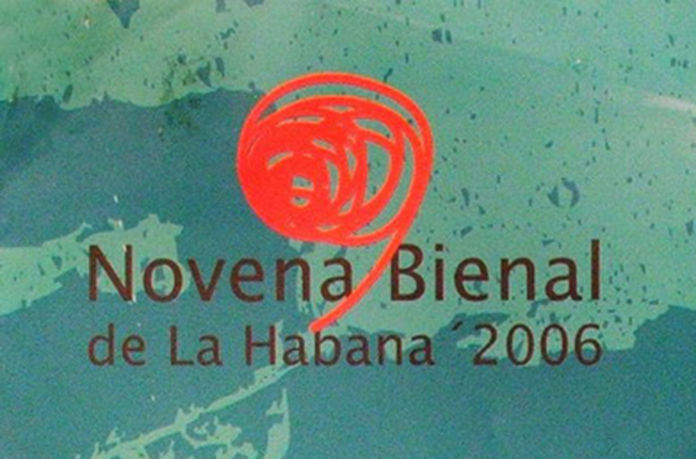

=== 9th Bienal de La Habana ===
Subject: Dynamics of urban culture

Director: Rubén Del Valle

Held in 2006, this edition was intended to draw attention to contemporary visual culture, which owes much to the popular components in the urban scenario, architecture and graphic elements that produce a complex web of relationships, coherent in some cases, chaotic in others, but undoubtedly essential in the landscape of everyday life. Topics such as demographic implosion, traditions and informal economy, urban transformations operated by real estate companies associated with tourism, the multicultural city, accelerated urbanization, uncontrolled urban growth, advertising saturation, poverty and gentrification, ruralization, and culinary culture and identity were developed. There were also urban interventions in streets, bus stops and, to a lesser extent, interactive ones such as the itinerant project Museo Peatonal (Pedestrian Museum).

113 artists from 49 countries participated in the event.

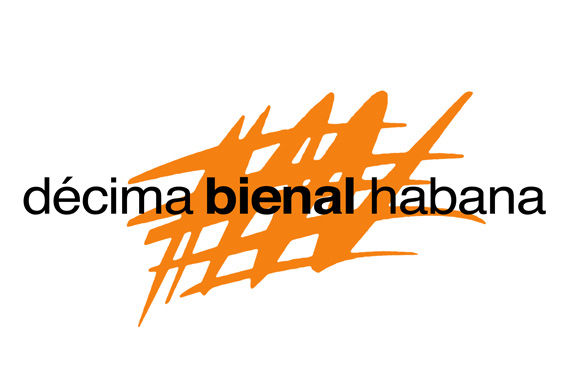

=== 10th Bienal de La Habana ===
Subject: Integration and Resistance in the global era

Director: Rubén Del Valle

It was held from March 27 to April 30, 2009, within the framework of the 25th anniversary of the event. Experts from the Wifredo Lam Contemporary Art Center reviewed more than 400 proposals submitted by artists from 44 nations. For the first time, the organisers decided to include western countries.

The 10th edition added conferences, workshops, master classes, documentaries and video screenings. The artists transformed the city into a showcase of contemporary art, taking over all available urban spaces and municipal galleries.

Common topics included the tensions between tradition and contemporary reality, challenges to the historical processes of colonization, the relationships between art and society, individuals and memory, the effects of technological development on human communication and the dynamics of urban culture.

The curators for this 2009 Biennial were Margarita González, Nelson Herrera Ysla, José Manuel Noceda, Ibis Hernández Abascal, Margarita Sánchez Prieto, José Fernández Portal and Dannys Montes de Oca Moreda.

==== Selected Cuban Artists Projects ====
- Jose Emilio Fuentes Fonseca (JEFF) – Herd of elephants
- Mario M. González – Collective exhibition on the global theme “Flag” with around 200 artists
- Wilfredo Prieto – Star in the sky of Havana
- Liset Castillo – Archaeology of Power
- Yoan Capote – Open Mind
- René Francisco Rodriguez – Interpret
- Alexander Beatón – The Permanent Race
- Duvier del Dago Fernandez – The Black Box
- Los Carpinteros – Fluido

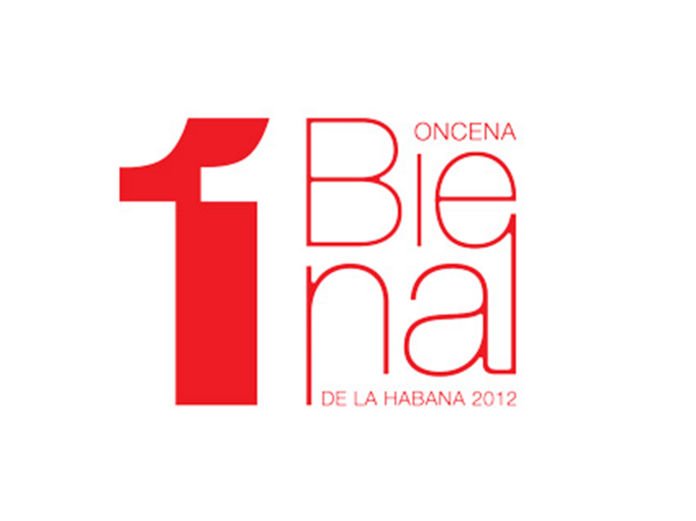

=== 11th Bienal de La Habana ===
Subject: Artistic Practices and Social Imaginaries

Director: Jorge Antonio Fernández Torres

The 2012 edition, under the theme "Artistic Practices and Social Imaginaries", brought together more than 115 artists from 43 countries, with contemporary art representatives from Mexico, Guatemala, Spain, Colombia, Ecuador, Argentina, Brazil, Nicaragua and Panama, among others.

In this edition the main interest was to reflect on the basis on which social networks are constituted and become a space for socialization where information is shared and contents are generated. It was essential to foster dialogues between insiders and outsiders, to work with live art and to permanently involve the spectator. The Cuban context and public spaces would become a temporary laboratory for artistic experimentation.

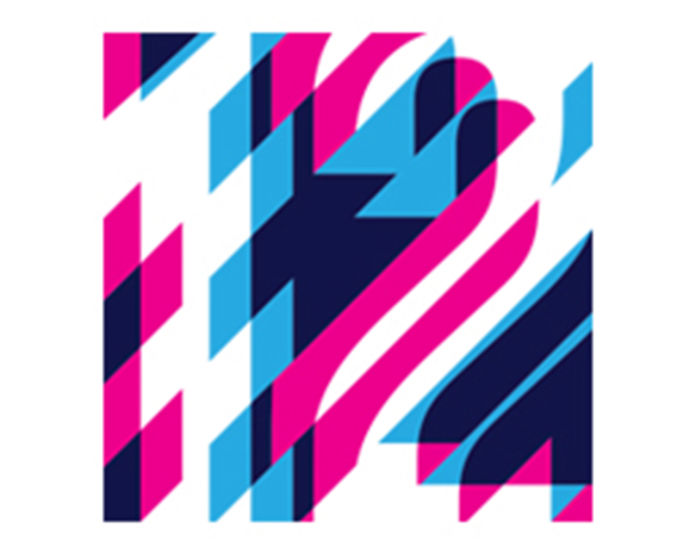

=== 12th Bienal de La Habana ===
Subject: Between the idea and the experience

Director: Jorge Antonio Fernández Torres

For the 12th edition, held between May 22 and June 22, 2015, the theme "Between Idea and Experience" was proposed as a journey through the history of the biennial itself. It aspired to settle in those interstices of the city that would facilitate the work on the aforementioned assumptions. These ideas broadened the dissimilar views on the role and functions of curatorship in the different scenarios, on the relevance or not of a theme presiding over the dynamics of the work itself and the environment in which it is produced, or on the intervention generated by each creative process according to the place and the situation for which they were conceived.

Large-scale and popular outdoor events were organized, such as "Zona Franca", located in La Cabaña, and "Detrás del muro", which took over Havana's seafront. In addition, there was a collateral exhibition that included more than a hundred interventions throughout the city and about 50 open studios, a modality that allowed artists to share their creative space, perhaps escaping a strict curatorship, and the audience to participate in that art.

Artists:

Hundreds of artists have participated in the different editions of the Havana Biennial, such as Antoni Muntadas, Marta Palau Bosch, León Ferrari, Liliana Porter, Arnold Belkin, Fernell Franco, Oscar Muñoz, Ernesto Neto, Marco Maggi, Nelson Ramos, Luis Camnitzer, Lacy Duarte, Andrea Goic, Tania Bruguera, José Bedia, Rubén Alpízar Quintana, William Kentridge, Nicholas Hlobo, Jorge Pablo Lima, Geranio Rodríguez, Juvenal Ravelo, Nadín Ospina, Rachel Valdés among many others.

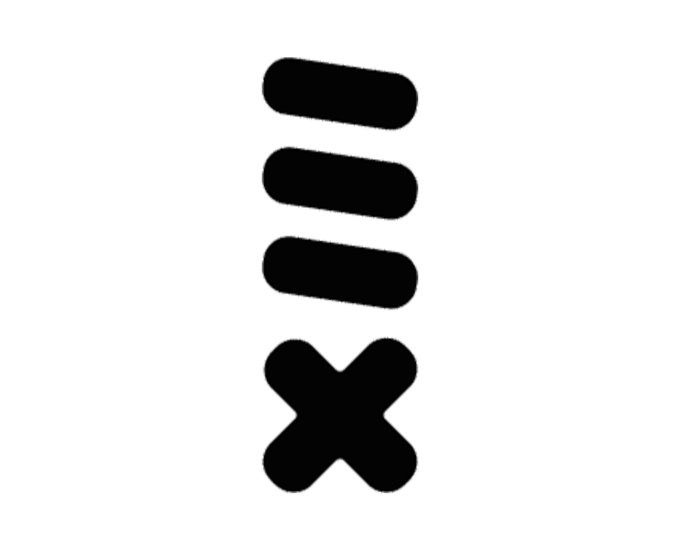

=== 13th Bienal de La Habana ===
The 2018 Bienal was canceled due to impact of Hurricane Irma and rescheduled for April 12 - May 12, 2019

Subject: The Construction of the Possible.

Director: Jorge Alfonso

For the first time ever, The Havana Biennial also took place in other Cuban cities, including Matanzas, where Intermittent Rivers took place. As an invited artist to the 13th Havana Biennial, María Magdalena Campos-Pons took the opportunity to initiate a project that would revitalize the artistic community of Matanzas.It has been actively supported by the Wifredo Lam Center, as well as institutions in Matanzas, such as Provincial Council for Visual Arts, the Galería Pedro Esquerré and an international curatorial team that includes Octavio Zaya, Salah M. Hassan, Annie Aguettaz, and Selene Wendt.

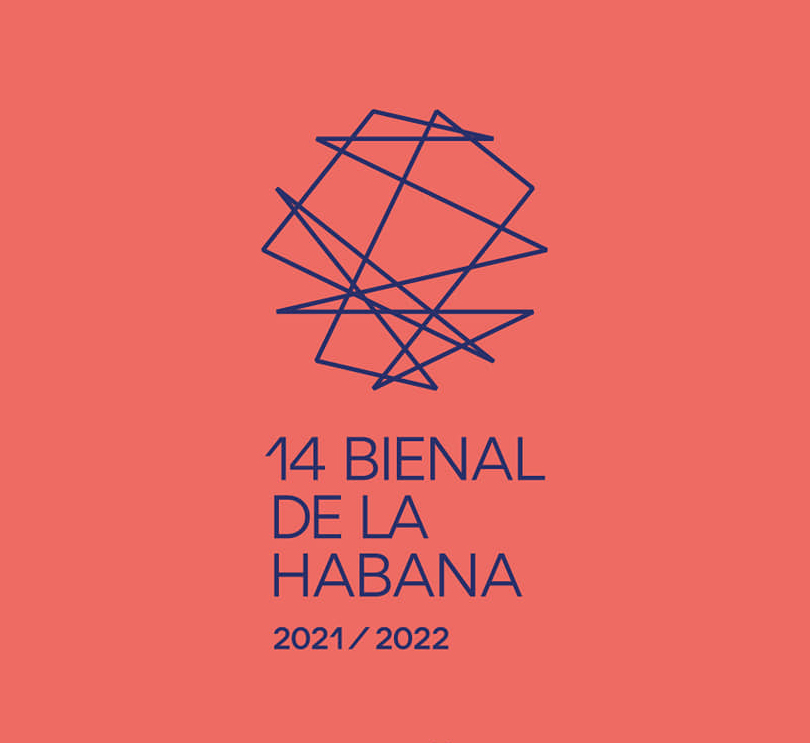

=== 14th Bienal de La Habana ===
Theme: Future and Contemporaneity

Director: Nelson Ramírez de Arellano.

This edition ran for almost six months, from November 12, 2021 to April 30, 2022, marking a first for the festival. The event was split into three stages, called the "Experiences".

Experience 1: Preamble (November 12 to December 5, 2021).

Experience 2: Havana of the Biennial (December 6 to March 24, 2022)

Experience 3: Back to the future (From March 25 to April 30, 2022)
