= The Ludwig Foundation of Cuba =

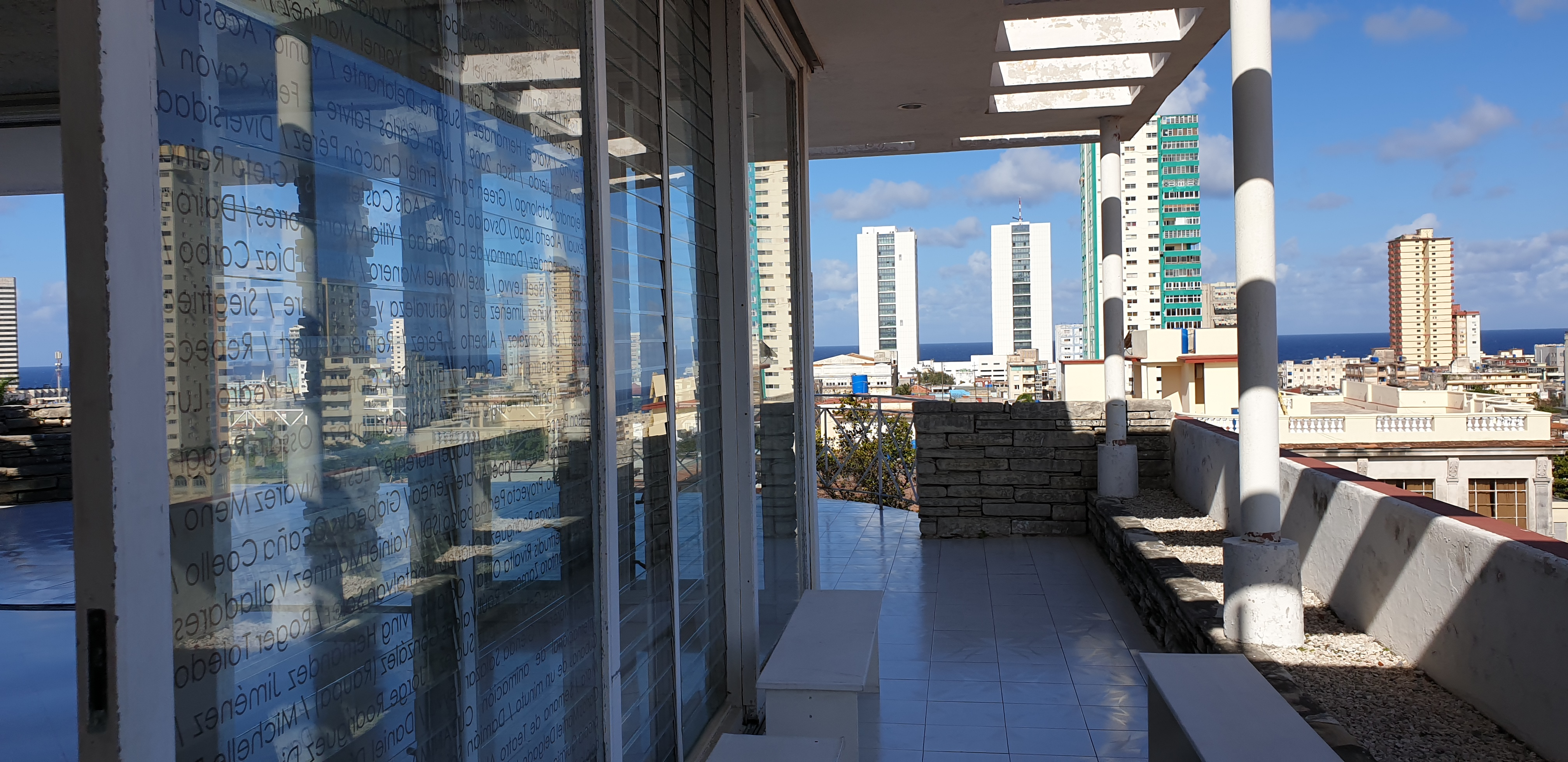
- Established: 1995
- Location: Havana, Cuba
- Coordinates: 23.138492°N 82.393889°W
- Type: Art Foundation
- President: Helmo Hernández

The Ludwig Foundation of Cuba (LFC) is a non-governmental, non-profit institution located in Havana, Cuba, created with the mission of protecting and promoting Cuban artists in Cuba and internationally.

== History ==
After seeing an exhibition of Cuban Art in Düsseldorf, the art patrons and collectors Peter and Irene Ludwig began to interest themselves in contemporary Cuban art. They made many visits to Cuba and formed an important collection of Cuban art, including artists Belkis Ayón Manso, José Braulio Bedia Valdés, Los Carpinteros, Antonio Eligio Fernández, Kcho, and Marta Mariá Pérez Bravo. This couple of world-renowned European private collectors developed the idea to create a museum in Havana with support from their foundation, the Peter and Irene Ludwig Foundation located in Aachen. This German Foundation has links with over twenty public museums based in Europe and Asia. However, the creation of such a Project became impossible at the time, so they decided that a foundation with the mission of protecting and promoting Cuban artists in Cuba and abroad would be the idea. Thus, Ludwig's commitment and cooperation allowed the new foundation, the first in South America, to respond to the enormous economic difficulties of the island, which had previously caused the emigration of artists and the weakening of cultural institutions.

Created in 1995 as an autonomous, non-governmental, and non-profit public entity, the Ludwig Foundation of Cuba is today an important center that helps protect, preserve and promote the work of contemporary Cuban artists in and outside of Cuba. It is administered by the American Friends of the Ludwig Foundation of Cuba (AFLFC), and is directed by its current president Helmo Hernández.

== Exhibitions and events ==
Cuban artists have been able to forge significant connections with their counterparts throughout the world thanks to the Foundation's exhibitions and cultural exchanges. Although the institution's initial focus was on the visual arts, it quickly started experimenting with the performing arts. From architecture, dance performances to mobile app development and from theatrical readings to graphic design, the Foundation works to educate, promote and protect the work of Cuba's emerging artists. They organize exhibitions at their headquarters as well as in other museums, as was the case of the Gerardo Rueda exhibition at the San Francisco Convent in Havana in 1999. Among the artists exhibited at the Foundation we find María Elena González, José Manuel Fors, Charly Nijensohn, Esterio Segura Mora, Grupo ABTV, Keith Anthony Morrison, Alberto Sarrain and Juan Carlos Alom, who collaborated in the large visual event : “Uno de cada clase” in 1995. In May 2022 the Foundation showed the exhibition Vest + Menté with the recent work on paper and screen by the Swiss-Cuban artist Daniel Garbade, curated by Nuria Delgado and Alejandro Baro.

International artists such as Glenda León, René Peña, Juan Carlos Alom and Lázaro Saavedra participated in the First National Festival of Video Art in Havana (2001) organized by the Foundation.
