= Château des Adhémar =

Castle in Montélimar, Drôme, France

- Montélimar, Drôme, France
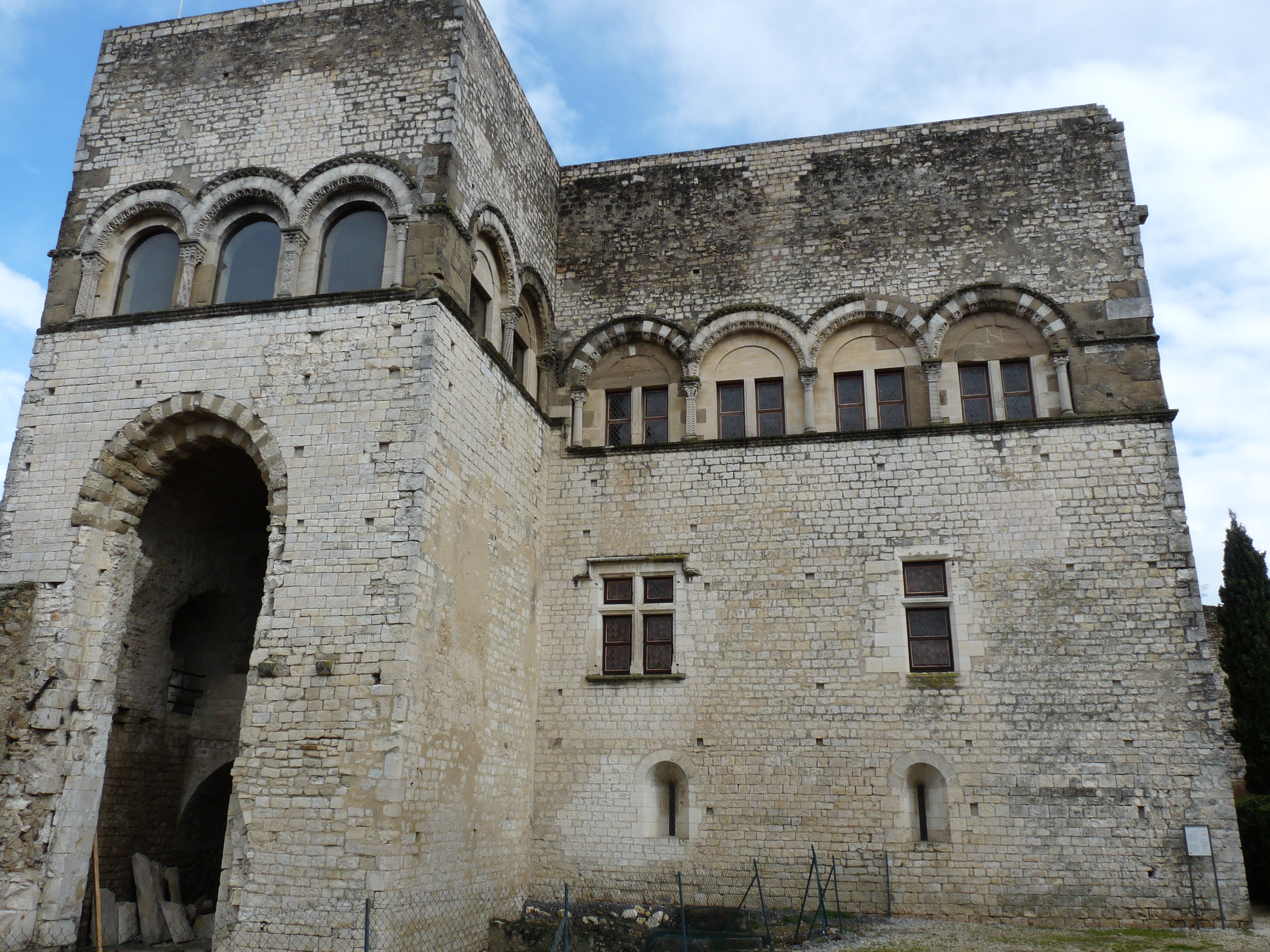
- View of the west facade

Site information
- Owner: Département de la Drôme
- Open to the public: Yes
- Condition: Preserved

Location
- Coordinates: 44°33′33″N 4°45′16″E

Site history
- Built: 12th century
- Built by: Adhémar family

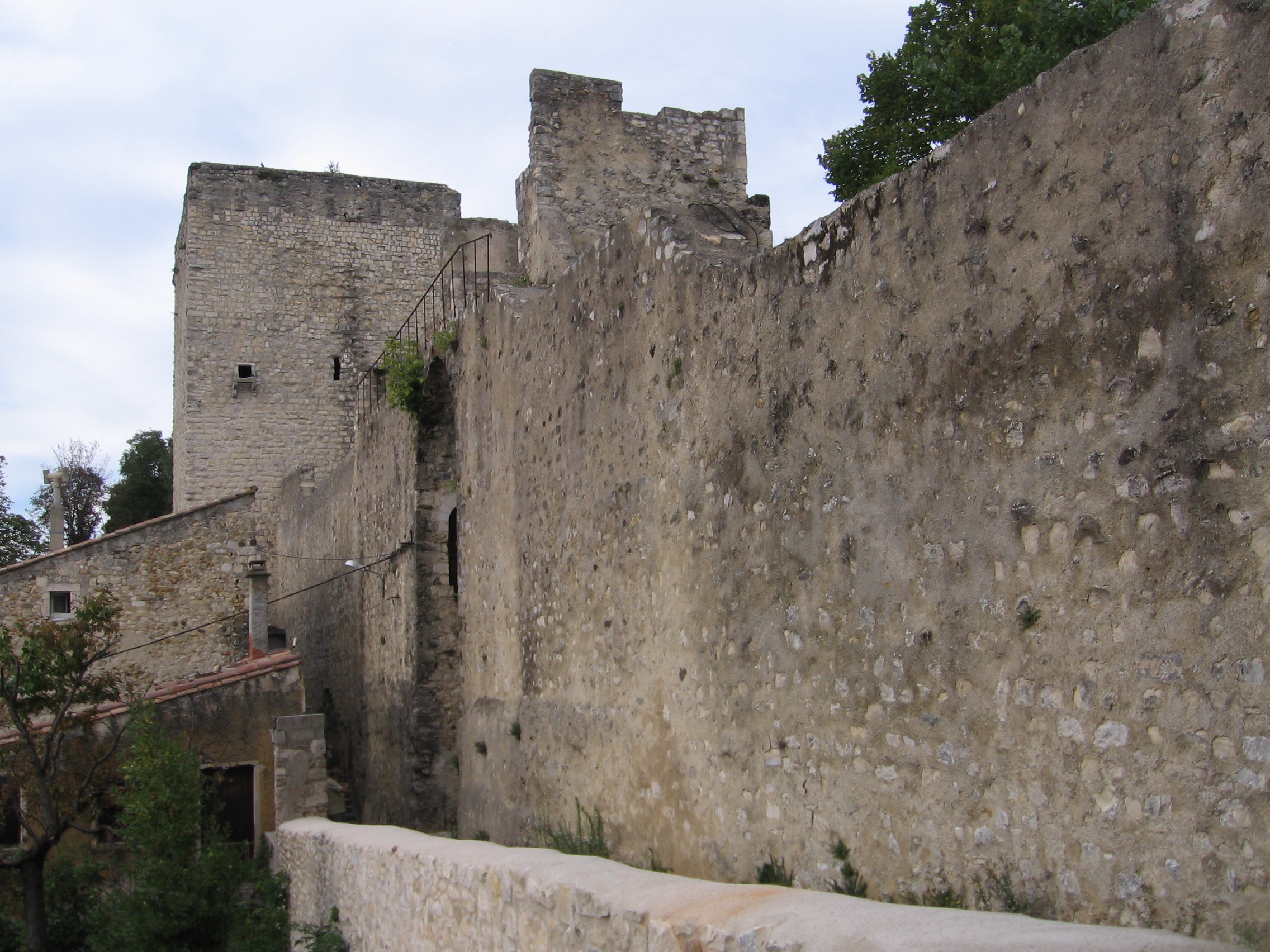
Rampart between the château and the Narbonne tower

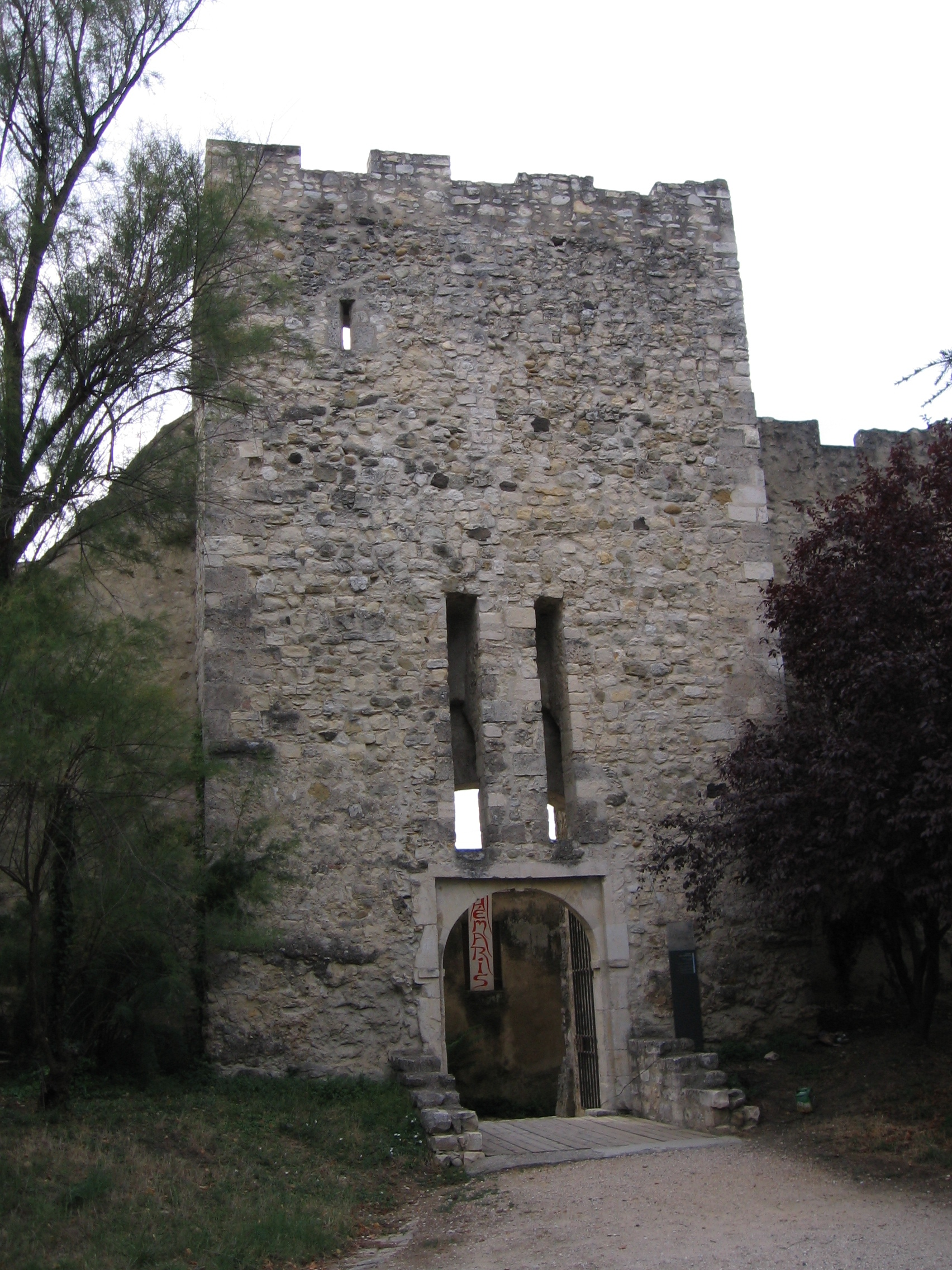
Entrance

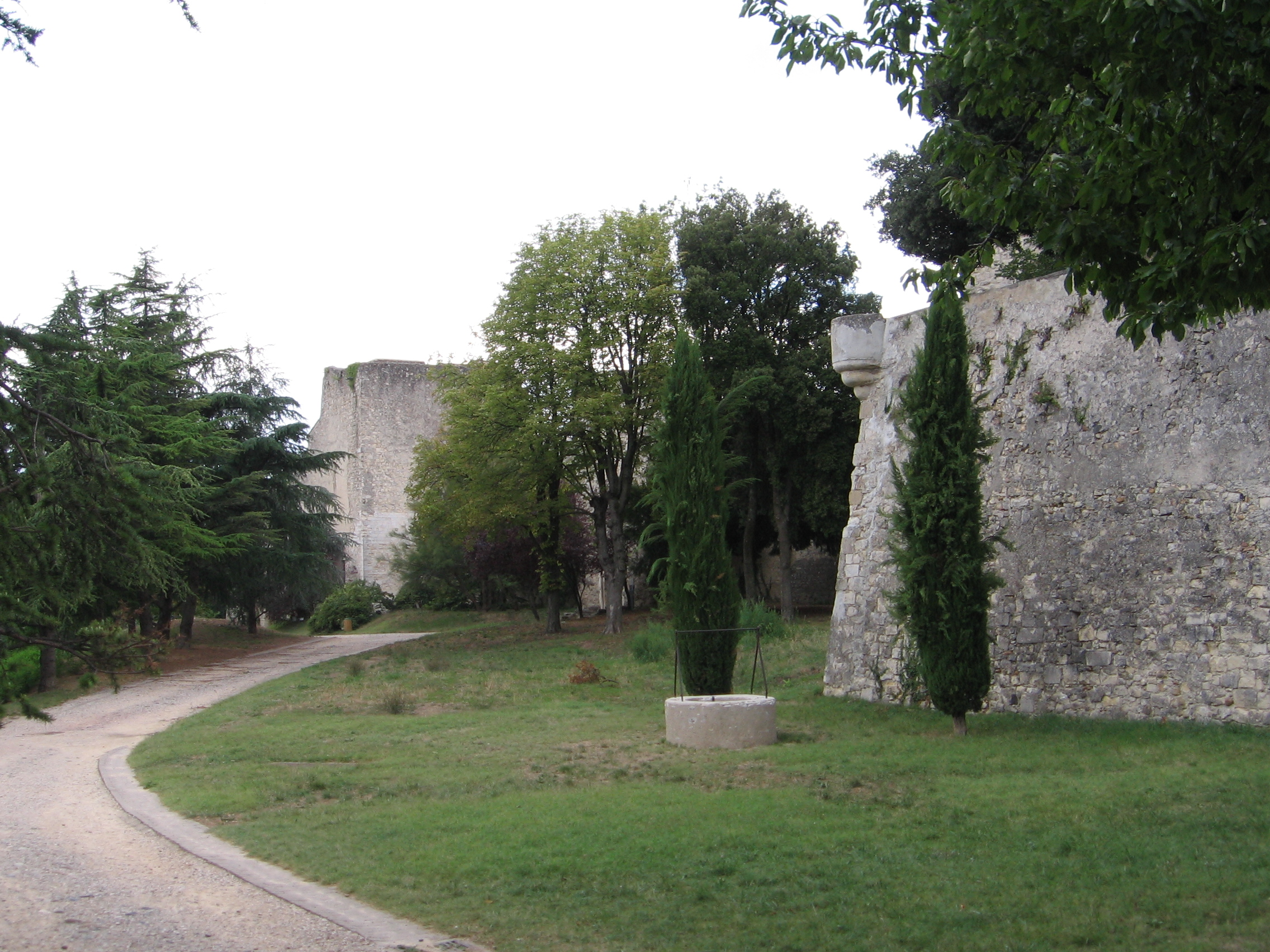
Castle walls

The Château des Adhémar is a castle, later converted to a Renaissance style château, in the French town of Montélimar in the Drôme département. It is located on a hill in the centre of the town.

== History ==
Its origins are found in the 11th century when the first castle was built by the Count of Toulouse, the Duke of Narbonne. Little of this remains.

In the second half of the 12th century it became the property of the Adhémar de Monteil family, lords of Rochemaure, later lords of Grignan, then at the height of their power. The palace they built substantially exists today.

In the 14th century, it was taken by the papacy, joining the Pope's castles until 1447, when Montélimar was returned to the kingdom of France. The site of many armed conflicts, especially during the Wars of Religion, the castle suffered much damage and was transformed into a citadel, then back to a pleasant residence with the return of more peaceful times. In the 15th century it was used as a prison.

In the middle of the 16th century, Louis Adhémar rebuilt in the Renaissance style. During the French Revolution, the castle was partially destroyed.

The castle was a prison again between 1791 and 1926, a use which has meant that it remained practically intact.

== Architecture ==
The château is considered to be one of the last examples of Romanesque castle architecture, having a fortified curtain wall, round walk, keep, a house and chapel, combining social, family, political and religious life in one. Only the Narbonne tower is outside the first wall, some metres to the north. Of the original 12th-century residential buildings, only the palace remains. There are three large rectangular rooms reached through a monumental doorway. The spectacular decoration of the lodgings is concentrated on the first floor gallery, with no fewer than nine semicircular arches with sculptured columns. This series of windows extends the full length of the building.

The keep has three floors. The austere architecture, with thick walls, reminds visitors of the castle's medieval origins.

The castle has been listed as a monument historique by the French Ministry of Culture since 1889.

== Contemporary art ==
The property of the Département de la Drôme since 1947, the Adhémar’s castle is a monument historique and was a contemporary art centre from 2000 to 2017. This centre worked with artist projects linking both a high standard of proposals and a real firmly fixed territorial spot. A new Museum of Contemporary Art recently opened in former barracks in the north of the city centre. The aim of the centre of contemporary art through the three castles of the Drôme general council (Adhémar at Montélimar, Grignan, Suze-la-Rousse) is to match contemporary creation and cultural heritage. Since its creation, about a fifty temporary exhibitions has been performed with renowned national artists, even international and younger ones.

Besides the contrast between medieval architecture and the various forms of present creation, the castle originality is expressed by the artists who have to keep in mind the important heritage of the place. Thus, each artist develops a strategy in their creation to emphasize, to refute, to express, to reveal or to conceal the powerful architectural presence of the Adhémar’s castle.

== Exhibitions ==
- 2001 : André Morin, Alberto Giacometti, Ange Leccia, Laetitia Benat, Nicolas Delprat
- 2002 : Danielle Jacqui, Daniel Buren, Ivan Fayard, Patrick Tosani
- 2003 : Krijn de Koning, Felice Varini, Jean-Luc Moulène, Damien Beguet
- 2004 : Virginie Litzler, Alexandre Ovize, Nicolas Prache, Sarkis, Adam Adach, Stéphane Calais
- 2005 : Delphine Balley, Clare Langan, Christine Laquet, Stéphanie Nava, Tadashi Kawamata, Françoise Quardon, Pierre David
- 2006 : Alina Abramov, Armand Jalut, Aurélie Pétrel, Bernhard Rüdiger, David Renaud, Philippe Durand
- 2007 : Eoin Mc Hugh, Le Gentil Garçon, Marie-José Burki, Etienne Bossut
- 2008 : Cécile Hesse, Gaël Romier, Sophie Lautru, John Armleder, Lilian Bourgeat, Christine Rebet
- 2009 : Jean-Louis Elzéard, Magali Lefebvre, Sarah Duby, Xavier Veilhan, Jean-François Gavoty, Loris Cecchini, Yvan Salomone, Delphine Gigoux-Martin, Gilles Grand, Benjamin Seror
- 2010 : Julien Prévieux, Pierre Malphettes, Delphine Balley, Yan Pei Ming
- 2011 : Victoria Klotz, Ann Veronica Janssens, Betty Bui, Eric Rondepierre
- 2012 : Guillaume Bardet, Olga Kisseleva, Emmanuel Régent, Marie Hendriks
- 2013 : Mehdi Meddaci, Guillaume Bijl, Mat Collishaw, Glenda León

== See also ==
- List of castles in France
