= René Peña =

Cuban photographer (born 1957)

- Born: René de Jesus Peña Gonzalez; 1957 (age 68–69); Havana, Cuba
- Education: University of Havana
- Occupation: Photographer

René de Jesus Peña Gonzalez (born in 1957 in Havana) is a Cuban photographer.

His photographs have been in exhibitions in Cuba (Havana), Spain, and the United States (Seattle, Pennsylvania, New York City).

== History ==
René Peña graduated from the University of Havana with a specialization in English.

He took his first pictures with his family camera at the age of eight years but has never had any formal training. His work focuses on the duality between human inability to escape institutionalization and human desire for individualism. Peña's photography is characterized by stark contrasts, between black and white, subject and background, subject and object.

Peña's need for contrast is also reflected in his place of residence. He inhabits the Cerro neighbourhood of Havana which is home to a mostly poor African-Caribbean population, despite having been an enclave of Havana's richest families in the 19th century.

Although sometimes compared to Robert Mapplethorpe, Peña cites as his influences photographers Eduardo Moñoz Ordoqui and Marta Maria Perez Bravo (both of whom focus on black-and-white photography).

As of late, Peña has been experimenting with colour photos, as well as with digital cameras.

== Solo exhibitions ==
- René Peña: Fotografías, Fototeca de Cuba, Havana (2002)
- René Peña: Introspectiva, Casa de los Tiros, Granada, Spain (2002)
- Manmade Materials, Suyama Space, Seattle.
- Black + White in Color (w/ Cirenaica Moreira). Couturier Gallery. Los Angeles, USA. (2012)

== Collective exhibitions ==
- Cuba 1960-2000 Sogno e realtà, Fondazione Italiana per la Fotografia, Turin, Italy (2002)
- Latin American Artist Photographers from the de Lehigh University Art Gallery Collection, Lehigh University, Pennsylvania (2001)
- Passionately Cuban, University Art Museum, State University of New York at Albany, New York (2001).
- Queloides: Race and Racism in Cuban Contemporary Art, Havana-Pittsburgh-New York City-Cambridge, Ma. (2010-2012)
- Drapetomania: Grupo Antillano and the Art of Afro-Cuba (2013)
- First national Festival of Video Art at The Ludwig Foundation of Cuba (2001)

== See also ==
- List of Cuban artists
- List of photographers
