= Ferdinand Cheval =

French postman known for building the sculpture of a castle on his own

Coordinates: 45°15′23″N 5°1′43″E

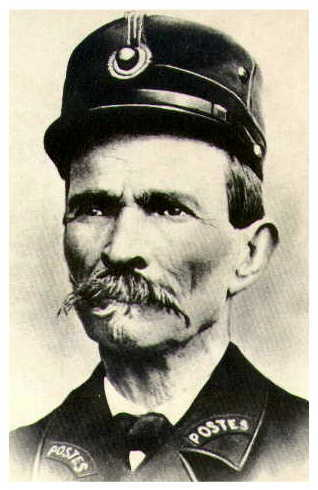
- Born: 19 April 1836; Charmes-sur-l'Herbasse, Drôme, France
- Died: 19 August 1924 (aged 88)
- Burial place: Hauterives cemetery
- Other name: Facteur Cheval
- Occupations: Mail carrier, artist
- Years active: 1879–1924
- Notable work: Le Palais idéal
- Spouse(s): Rosaline Revol (1858–1873); Claire-Philomène Richaud (1879–1914)
- Children: 3

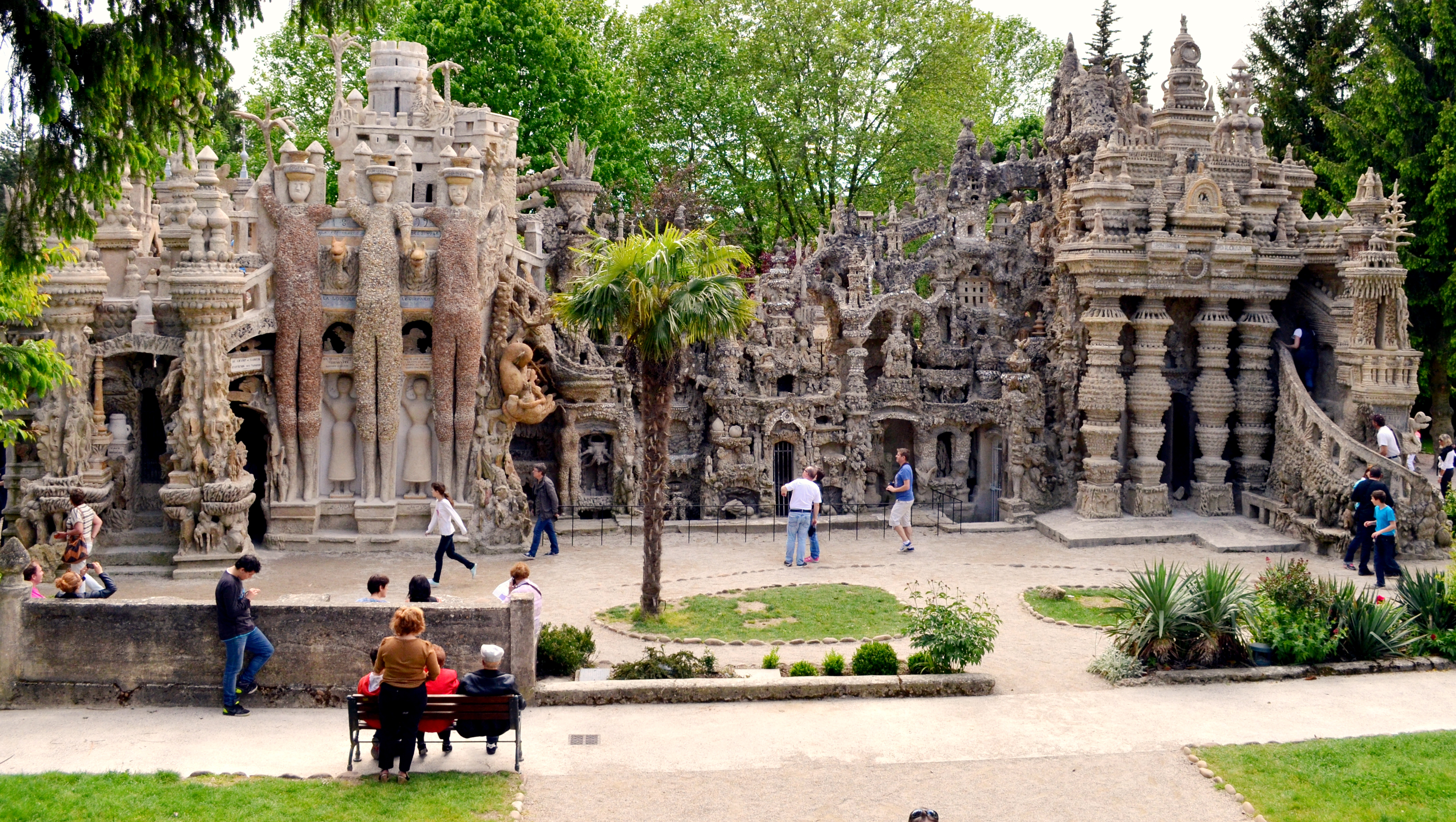
The east façade of Cheval's Palais idéal, 2014

Ferdinand Cheval (French pronunciation: [fɛʁdinɑ̃ ʃəval]; 19 April 1836 – 19 August 1924), often nicknamed Facteur Cheval ("Mail Carrier Cheval"), was a French mail carrier who spent 33 years building Le Palais idéal (the "Ideal Palace") in Hauterives, in southeastern France. It is regarded as an extraordinary example of naïve art architecture.

== Origins ==
Cheval was born in Charmes-sur-l'Herbasse to a poor farming family. He left school at age 13 to become a baker's apprentice, but eventually became a mail carrier.

In 1858, he married his first wife, Rosaline Revol. They had two sons, Victorin Joseph Fernand (1864) and Ferdinand Cyril (1867). Victorin died after only a year, in 1865. Rosaline herself died in 1873. Five years later, Cheval met and married Claire-Philomène Richaud. Her dowry included the land on which the Palais Idéal stands today. In 1878, she gave birth to their daughter, Alice-Marie-Philomène, who died in 1894 at the age of 15. Alice's death hit Cheval the hardest and she was the last child he would have. 18 years later, his son Cyril and second wife Claire died within two years of each other, in 1912 and 1914, respectively.

== Palais idéal ==
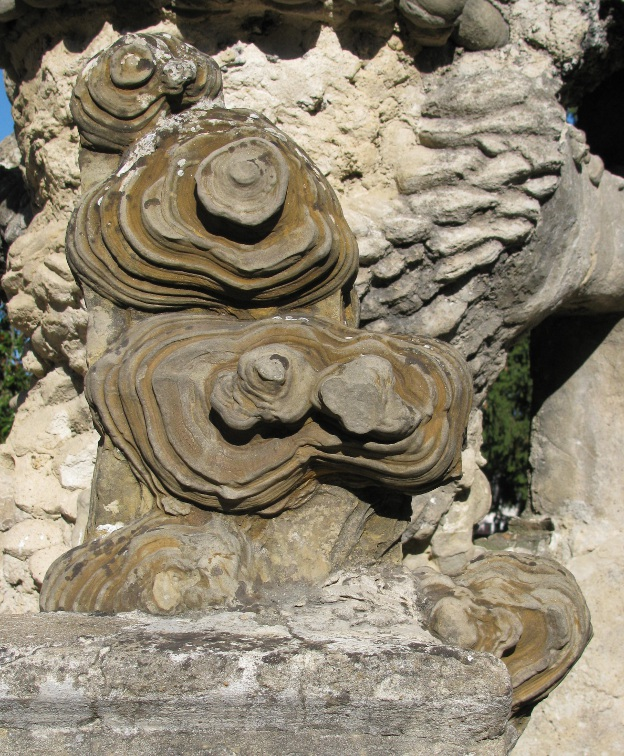
The starting point: the unusually-shaped stone that Cheval initially tripped over.

Cheval began building the Palais Idéal in 1879 when he was 43. He reported:

"I was walking very fast when my foot caught on something that sent me stumbling a few metres away, I wanted to know the cause. [Previously, in] a dream, I had built a palace, a castle or caves, I cannot express it well [...] I told no one about it for fear of being ridiculed and I felt ridiculous myself.

"Then fifteen years later, when I had almost forgotten my dream, when I wasn't thinking of it at all, my foot reminded me of it. My foot tripped on a stone that almost made me fall. I wanted to know what it was [...] It was a stone of such a strange shape that I put it in my pocket to admire it at my leisure.

"The next day, I went back to the same place. I found more stones, even more beautiful, I gathered them together on the spot and was overcome with delight [...] It's a sandstone shaped by water and hardened by the power of time. It becomes as hard as pebbles. It represents a sculpture so strange that it is impossible for man to imitate, it represents any kind of animal, any kind of caricature.

"I said to myself: since Nature is willing to do the sculpture, I will do the masonry and the architecture."

For the next 33 years, Cheval picked up stones during his daily mail rounds and carried them home to build the Palais idéal. At first, he carried the stones in his pockets, then switched to a basket. Eventually, he used a wheelbarrow. He often worked at night, by the light of an oil lamp. He spent the first 20 years building the outer walls.

The palace materials mainly consist of stones (river washed), pebbles, porous tufa and fossils of different shapes and sizes. When visitors arrive at the palace, the first thing they see is the southern facade, approximately 26 metres (85 feet) long and up to 10 m (33 ft) high. The decoration resembles aspects of both the Royal Pavilion in Brighton, England and Antoni Gaudí's Sagrada Família. Cheval did not travel and had even given himself the title of peasant, so even though some qualities of his work resemble those pieces of art, he had never seen them.

In his essay on the achievement, John Berger writes: “Cheval himself called his Palace a temple to nature. Not a temple to the nature of travellers, landscapists, or even Jean-Jacques Rousseau, but to nature as dreamt by a genius expressing the vision of a class of cunning, hardened survivors.”

Three giant stones, each with doll-like faces, standing about 10.5 metres high, serve not only as decoration but as a support system for the Barbary Tower, with a line of cement swans leading up to a spiral staircase. The three giant stones were named after Vercingétorix, Archimedes and Julius Caesar, the names of each hand-carved by Cheval into each individual figure.

The north façade exhibits a long path dotted with large openings to provide plentiful light leading into the heart of the palace itself. This façade is strikingly forest-like: walls are coated in moss and massive seaweed. The ceiling's swirling patterns of pebbles and shells outline the chandeliers. Upper walls are lined with horizontal bands that have animals carved into them, Egyptian style. Other animals on the north façade include two ostriches (presumably mother and father) and an ostrich chick, a 1.2 m (3.9 ft) tall camel, flamingos, octopuses, lions, dragons, and a polar bear.

The east façade took the longest to build, 20 years. It includes the Temple of Nature, an Egyptian style temple-like structure supported by large, thick sandstone columns. It includes two waterfalls called the Source of Life and the Source of Wisdom.

The Palais is a mix of different styles, with inspirations from Christianity to Hinduism. Cheval bound the stones together with lime, mortar and cement.

The palace is sprinkled with short quotes and poems, hand-carved by Cheval himself. Some examples being "If you look for gold you will find it in elbow grease.", "The Pantheon of an obscure hero." "The work of one man", "Out of a dream I have brought forth the Queen of the World", "This is of art, and of energy", "The ecstasy of a beautiful dream and the prize of effort", "Dream of a peasant", "Temple of Life", and "Palace of the Imagination". Perhaps the most iconic phrase he inscribed on the wall reads "1879–1912 10000 days, 93000 hours, 33 years of struggle. Let those who think they can do better try."

== Burial ==
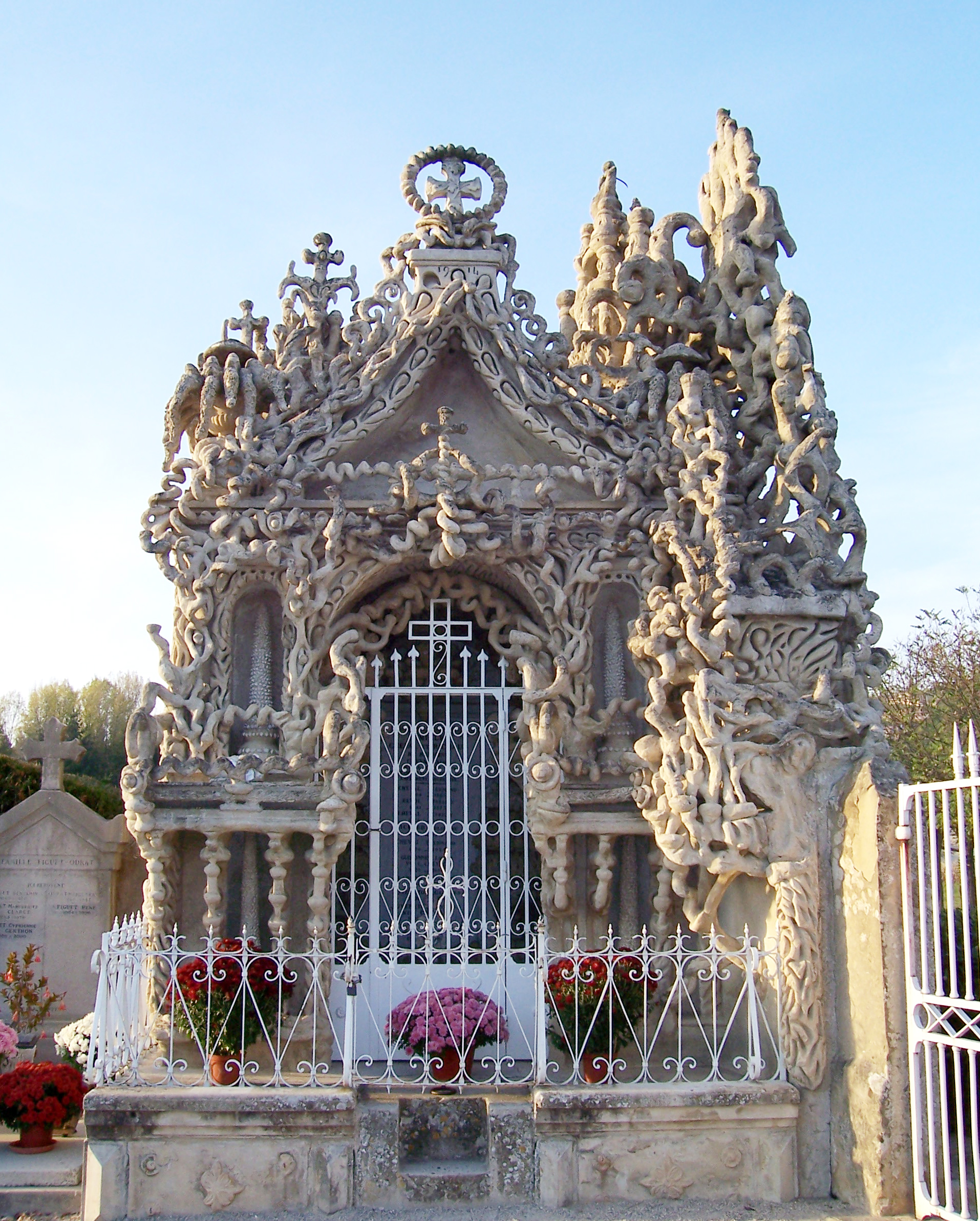
Cheval's mausoleum

Cheval also wanted to be buried in his palace. When, however, the French authorities prohibited that, he spent eight more years building a mausoleum for himself in the Hauterives cemetery. He died on 19 August 1924, about a year after he had finished building it, and is buried there.

== Recognition ==
Just before his death, Cheval received recognition from figures including André Breton, Robert Doisneau, and Pablo Picasso. His work is commemorated in an essay by Anaïs Nin. In 1932, the German artist Max Ernst created a collage titled The Postman Cheval. The collage belongs to the Peggy Guggenheim Collection and is on display there. In 1958, Ado Kyrou produced Le Palais idéal, a short film about Cheval's palace.

After admiring Cheval's work, Picasso created a series of drawings telling a narrative, in a cartoon fashion, which is now recognized as Facteur Cheval sketchbook in 1937. Picasso drew him as a twisted, hybrid-like creature (or beast), carved with the initials of the French postal service (P.T.T.) on his skin, dressed in typical postman's attire, holding masonry tools and a letter. The creature was standing in front of his creation. In the drawing, Picasso took a humorous route, sketching Cheval's body in the shape of a horse and his head as a bird. Picasso did this to make of pun on Cheval's name and career, given birds are messengers (as Cheval was a postman) and Cheval means horse in French.

In 1969, André Malraux, the minister of Culture, declared the Palais a cultural landmark and had it officially protected. In 1986, Cheval was put on a French postage stamp.

In 2018, French director Nils Tavernier released the feature film L'incroyable histoire du facteur Cheval (English: The Ideal Palace) about Cheval's life and work, with Jacques Gamblin starring as Cheval.

In 2018 Will Varley included the song "The Postman" about Cheval and the Palais Idéal on his studio album Spirit of Minnie.

== Gallery ==
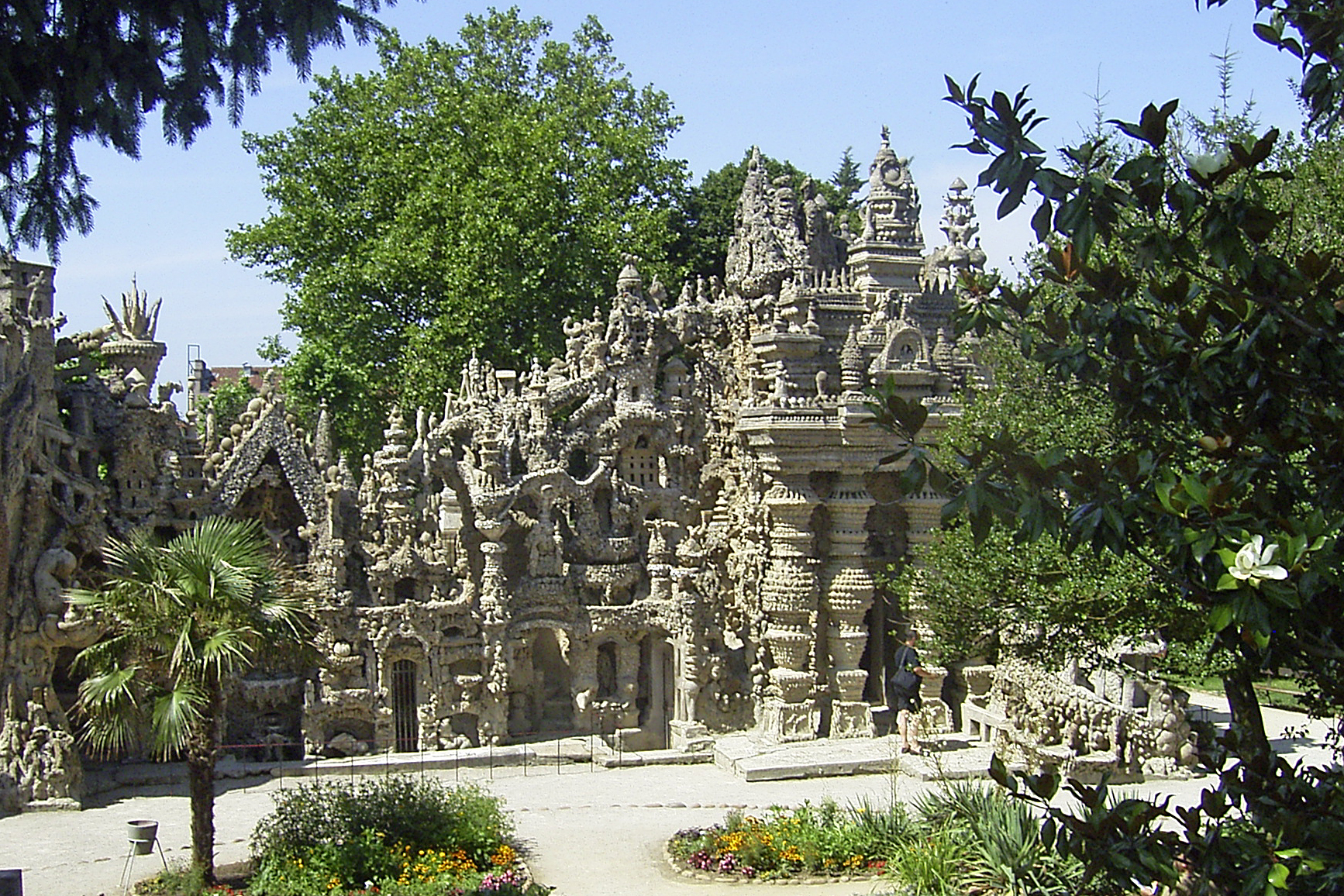
Palais idéal

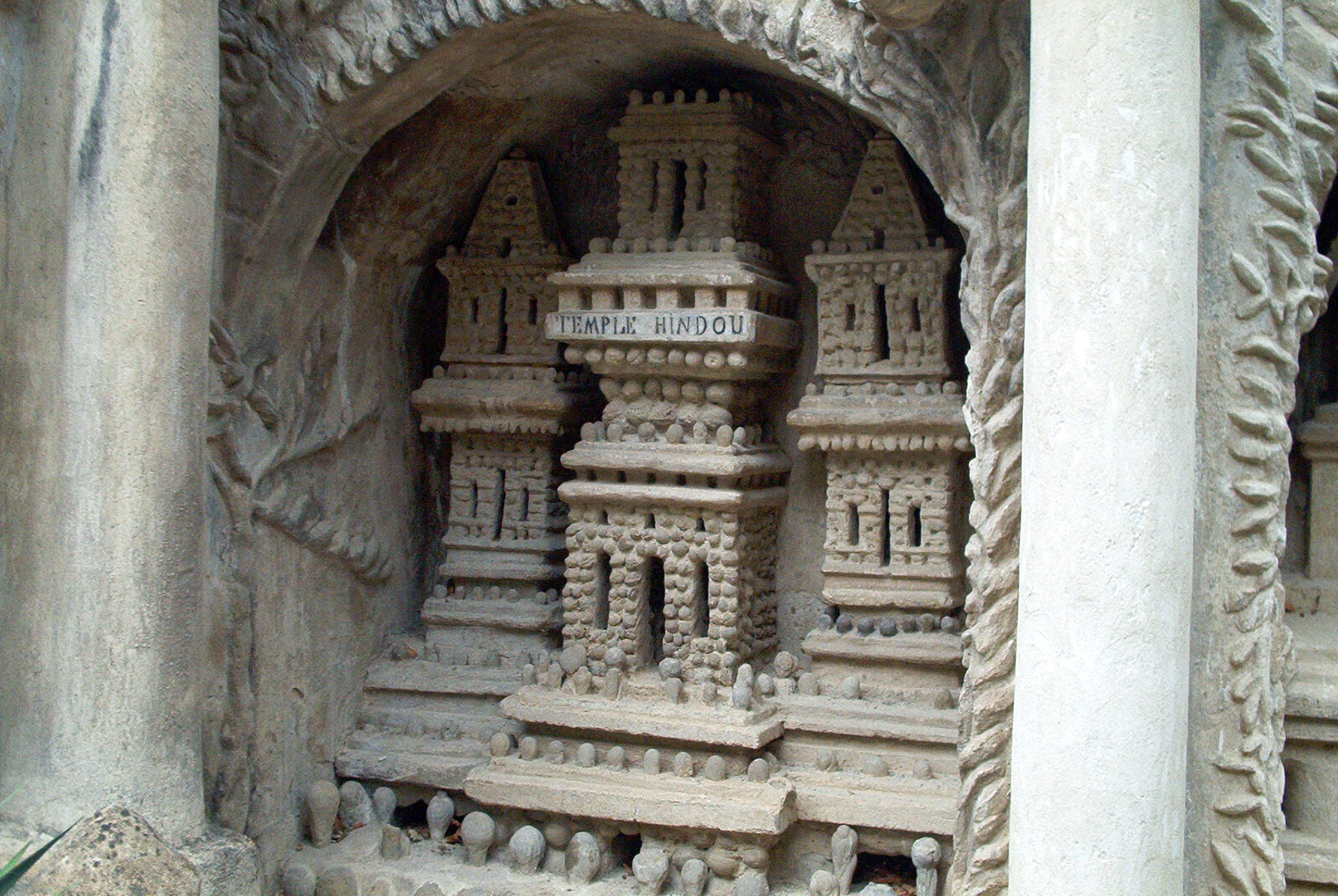
Hindu temple

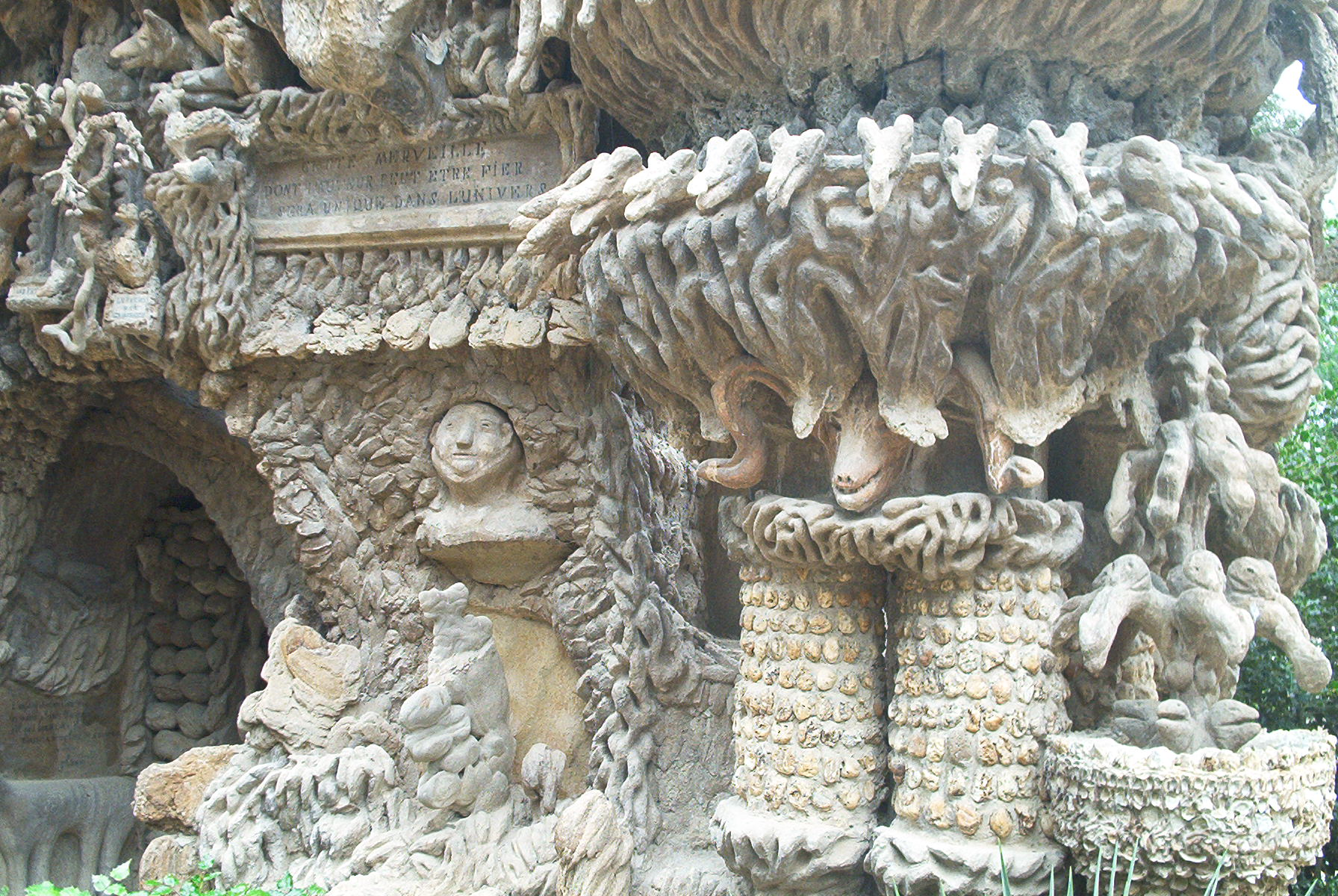
Detail of north front

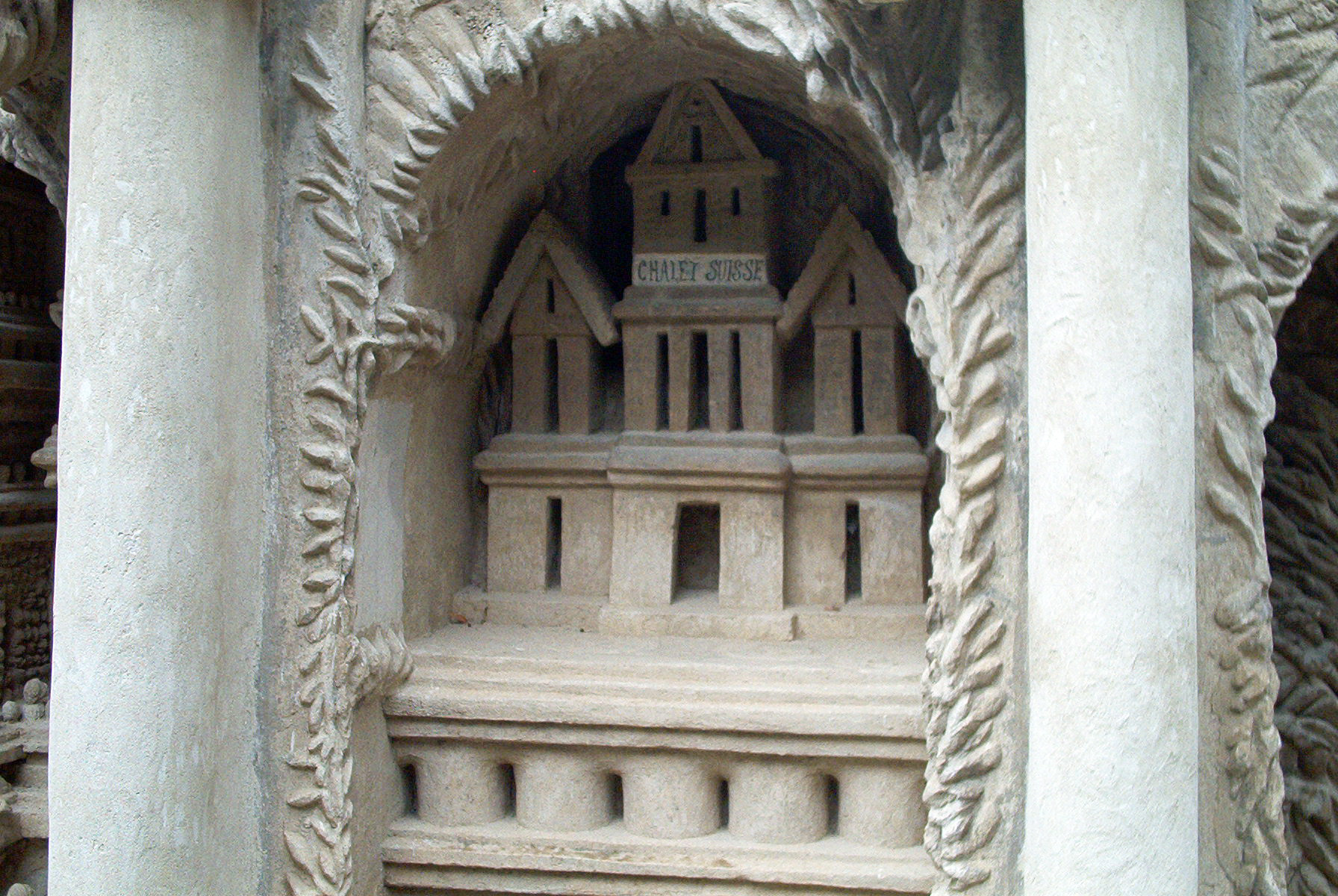
Swiss chalet

== See also ==
- Visionary environments
- Naïve art or outsider art
- Simon Rodia
  - Watts Towers
- Friedensreich Hundertwasser
  - KunstHausWien
  - Waldspirale
- Mary Nohl
  - Art Environment or Fox Point Art Yard
- Bunleua Sulilat
  - Buddha Park
  - Sala Keoku
- Nek Chand
  - Rock Garden of Chandigarh
- Edward Leedskalnin
  - Coral Castle
- Justo Gallego Martinez
- Bishop Castle
- Temple of All Religions
- Danielle Jacqui
