= Elliot and Erick Jiménez =

Cuban-American artist duo (born 1989)

Elliot & Erick Jiménez
- Born: 1989 (age 36–37); Miami, Florida, U.S.
- Occupations: Fashion Photographers, Visual Artists
- Website: elliotanderick.com

Elliot & Erick Jiménez (born 1989 in Miami, Florida) are identical twin brothers and visual artists working between contemporary art and fashion. Their artwork draws on syncretic Afro-Cuban religious traditions and spiritual beliefs, while paying homage to artists such as the late Cuban artist Belkins Ayón and ethnographers in the likes of Lydia Cabrera. Their photographs offer a painterly quality, mixing nature and surrealist elements, and expands into sculpture and mixed media. The Jiménez brothers have been living and working between South Florida and New York City for over a decade.

== Early life and education ==
Elliot and Erick Jiménez are identical twins, raised by Cuban immigrants in Miami. The duo started their interest in photography after receiving their first camera at age 15; and went on to take their first photography course in high school. Although the brothers started photographing professionally separately, they soon realized they shared a joint interest.

== Work ==
Elliot and Erick Jiménez photographic work goes back and forth from fashion photography to visual art. In 2023, the duo photographed Puerto Rican musician Bad Bunny for the cover of Time Magazine, the first issue to be released in Spanish in the publication's one hundred year history. Their fashion work has been featured in Vogue and Harper's Bazaar Italy, among others. They've also collaborated with celebrities like Selena Gomez and Karol G.

Their art installation Blue Chapel (Rejection, Acceptance, Advocacy, Interdependence), was featured in the exhibition Surrealism and Us: Caribbean and African Diasporic Artists since 1940, on view at the Modern Art Museum of Fort Worth in Texas in 2024. Other installations include Red Chapel, featured at WSA in Duet, 2025, and Where Fertile Land Grows featured at Ford Foundation Gallery in Never The Same River, 2026.

In 2025, the Jiménez brothers held their first major institutional exhibition at the Pérez Art Museum Miami, Florida. The show Elliot and Erick Jiménez: El Monte, curated by Maritza Lacayo, expands on the duo's interest in Afro-Cuban religious practices, particularly in its syncretic aspects of Yoruba, Catholicism, and Spiritism. The solo show brings photographic work that draws on the artist's Cuban-American and the ritualistic Lucumí upbringing.

=== Awards ===
Elliot and Erick Jiménez are the recipients of the 2024 CINTAS Foundation Fellowship in Photography, South Arts Fellowship, the Florida Prize People’s Choice Award 2023, the CHANEL Artist Award Program with the Tribeca Film Festival, Emerging Photographers of the year for the Latin American Fashion Awards 2023, Oolite Creator Award, by Oolite Arts in South Florida.
