= Esterio =

Esterio is a male Spanish given name. Notable people with the name include:

- Esterio Caraballo (born 1913), Cuban baseball player
- Esterio Segura Mora (born 1970), Cuban artist

== See also ==
- Esterino
