= Alom =

Alom or ALOM may refer to:

- Alom (surname)
- Advanced Lights Out Manager, a Sun Microsystems's out-of-band management implementation
- Álom.net, a 2009 Hungarian romantic comedy film
- Három álom, a 2011 album by Hungarian singer Zoli Ádok
- Alom, the Maya sky god
