= Esterino =

Esterino is a male Italian given name. People with the name include:

- Esterino Montino (born 1948), Italian politician
- Lino Esterino Garavaglia (1927–2020), Italian prelate of the Catholic Church

== See also ==
- Esterio
