= José Manuel Fors =

Cuban artist (born 1956)

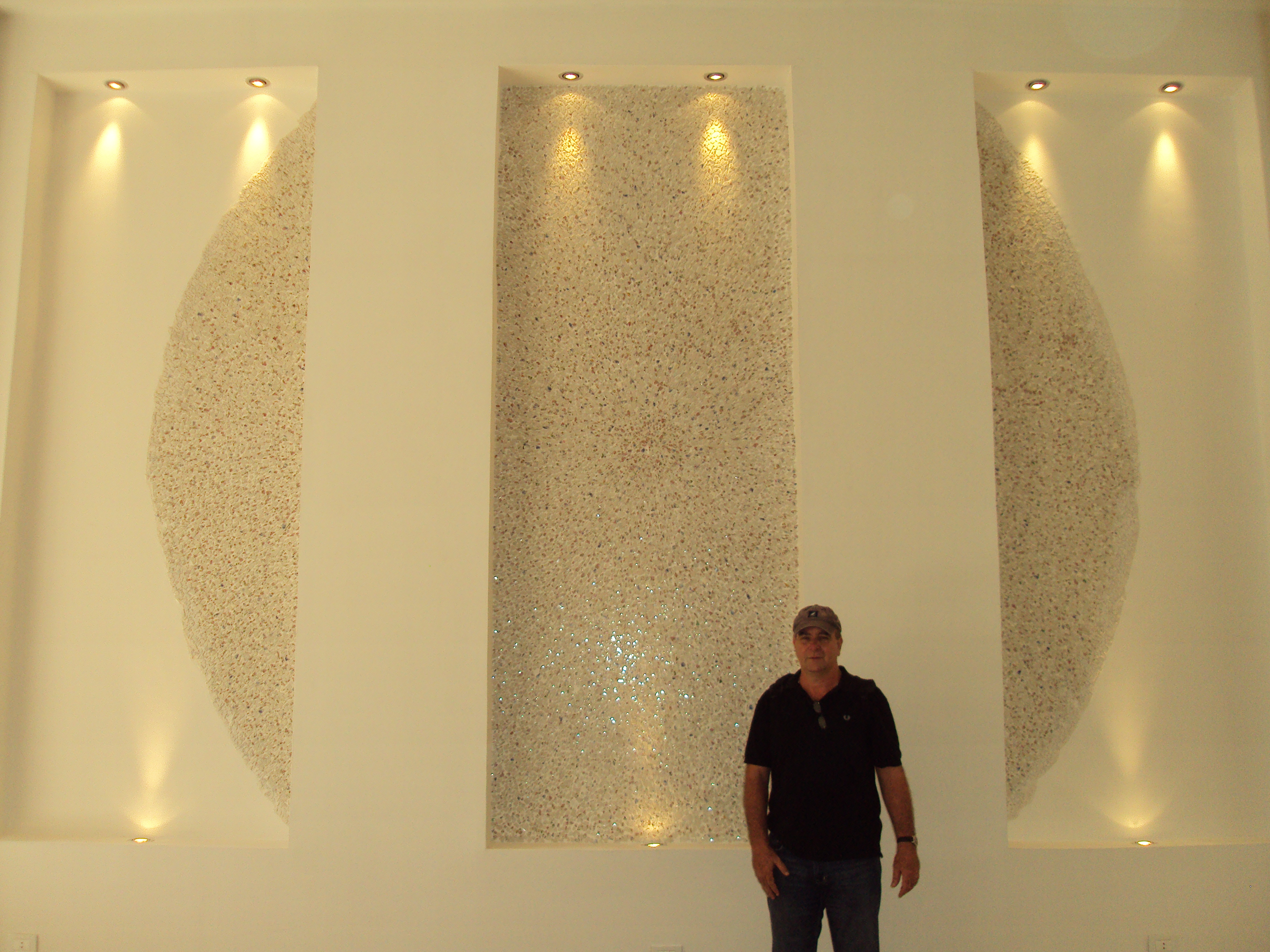
José Manuel Fors in front of one of his creations.

José Manuel Fors is a contemporary Cuban artist born in Havana in 1956. His work is principally based on installations and supported by photography. His first artistic forays, during the early eighties, were part of what has been coined "The Renaissance of Cuban Art". His artwork has been shown in renowned museums and galleries in the United States, Europe and Cuba.

== Biography ==
José Manuel Fors graduated from the Academy of Art San Alejandro in 1976. He then studied at the Institute of Museology in Havana from 1983 to 1986 and, at the same time, worked as museographer in the National Museum of Baux-Arts.

In 1981, Fors participated in one of the most important shows in Cuban artistic renewal, called Volume I. Subsequently, he switched from material abstraction to installations as his primary art form. His first personal exhibition, "Accumulations" (1983), thus set the stage for some of his most recurrent topics and methodologies as an artist.

Fors is often considered a photographer, despite the fact that he infrequently engages in photographic work and, in some cases such as in the early versions of "Fallen Leaves", it is merely documentary support. Furthermore, the photographs he usually uses in his installations are employed to reveal his interest in memory as topic in his work. In addition, their creations are inspired by the literature of some of the most important Cuban writers, mainly Eliseo Diego and Dulce Maria Loynaz, whose verses title some of Fors' artworks.

== Body of work ==
=== Collections ===
- National Museum of Fine Arts. Havana, Cuba
- Casa de Las Américas. Havana, Cuba
- Fototeca de Cuba. Havana, Cuba
- Los Angeles County Museum of Art 9 (LACMA) Los Angeles, CA, USA
- Museum of Contemporary Art (MOCA) Los Angeles, CA, USA
- The Museum of Fine Arts. Houston, Texas, USA
- Museum of Art. Fort Lauderdale, FL, USA
- University of Virginia Art Museum. Charlottesville, USA
- Jordan Schnitzer Museum of Art. University of Oregon, Eugene, USA.
- Fundación Museo de Bellas Artes. Caracas, Venezuela
- Museo Las Américas. Managua, Nicaragua
- The Pilara Foundation. San Francisco, California, USA.
- Farber collection
- CIFO
- Rubin Collection

=== Personal exhibitions ===
- Acumulaciones. Casa de la Cultura de Plaza. Havana, Cuba. 1983
- Golpes de vista. Provincial Museum. Villa Clara, Cuba. 1988
- La tierra. Centro Provincial de Artes Plásticas y Diseño. Havana, Cuba 1988
- Trabajos Fotográficos. Fototeca de Cuba. Havana, Cuba 1992
- El paso del tiempo, proyectos naturalezas conjuradas. Centro Wifredo Lam. Havana, Cuba. 1995
- Desde la tierra. II Jornada Fotográfica de Mérida. La Otra Banda Gallery. Mérida, Venezuela. 1996.
- Proyecto el voluble rostro de la realidad. Fototeca de Cuba. Fundación Ludwing de Cuba. Havana, Cuba. 1996.
- Los retratos. Fortaleza del Morro. VI Bienal de La Habana. Havana, Cuba. 1997
- Boy Cott Art Gallery. Brussels, Belgique. 1997
- Las ventanas. La Acacia Gallery. Havana, Cuba. 1997
- Verso Photo Gallery. Tokio, Japan. 1997
- Foto- Installatles. Geukens & De ViI Contemporary Art. Knokke- Zoute, Belgique.1998
- José Manuel Fors, Cuban Photographer. Couturier Gallery. Los Angeles, CA, USA 1999
- Salón Nacional de Fotografía. Centro de Desarrollo de las Artes Visuales, Havana. Cuba 1999
- José Manuel Fors, Cuban Photographer. Couturier Gallery. Los Angeles, CA, USA 2000
- Beyond Cuba, Mirages of Absence. José Manuel Fors y Rogelio López Marín (Gory) Beadleston Gallery. New York, USA 2001
- Grimaldis Gallery. Baltimore, MD, USA 2001
- Fallen Leaves. Couturier Gallery. Los Angeles, CA, USA 2002
- Los Objetos. Geukens & De ViI Contemporary Art, Knokke- Zoute, Belgique 2003
- Largas Cartas. Couturier Gallery. Los Angeles, CA, USA 2004
- Las Cartas. Casa de Las Américas. Latinoamerican Gallery. Havana, Cuba 2004
- Boy Cott Art Gallery. Brussels, Belgique 2005
- Círculos. Fototeca de Cuba. Havana, Cuba 2006
- Historias Circulares. National Museum of Fine Arts. Havana, Cuba 2006
- Objeto Fotográficos. Auditorio de Galicia. Santiago de Compostela, Spain 2006
- Objetos. La Casona Gallery. Havana, Cuba 2008
- Fragmentos. Pan American Art Projects. Miami FL, USA 2011
- Ciudad Fragmentada. KCI Gallery. Krause Center for Innovation. Foothill College, CA, USA 2012
- Pormenores. XI Bienal de la Habana, Fortaleza de La Cabaña. Havana, Cuba 2012
- Entre la Sombra y en la Pared. Villa Manuela Gallery. Havana, Cuba 2014
- El peso leve de todo lo creado. XII Bienal de La Habana. Fortaleza de la Cabaña. Havana, Cuba 2015
- Wide Shadow. Couturier Gallery. Los Angeles, CA, USA 2016
- Palimpsesto. National Museum of Fine Arts. Havana, Cuba 2017
- XIII Bienal de la Habana. National Museum of Fine Arts. Havana, Cuba 2019
- Candies. Pan American Art Projects. Miami FL, USA 2019

=== Collective exhibitions ===
2015

Contaminación. National Museum Fine Arts. Havana, Cuba.

Photography in Cuba Today. Chazen Museum. Madison, Wisconsin, USA.

Lens Work: Celebrating LACMA's Experimental Photography at 50. Los Angeles, USA.

2013

Almacenes Afuera. National Museum of Fine Arts. Havana, Cuba.

A Sense of Place. Pier 24. San Francisco, CA, USA.

Del otro lado del espejo. Servando Gallery. Havana, Cuba.

CUBART: Contemporary Cuban Art. Pan American Art Projects. New York, USA.

2012

Estado Actual. Muestra colectiva de las vanguardias cubanas. La Acacia Gallery. Havana, Cuba.

Las Metáforas del Cambio. Habana Factory. Collateral XI Bienal de la Habana, Cuba.

2011

50 en los 50. La Acacia Gallery. Havana, Cuba.

Urbanitas. Pan American Art Projects, Miami, Florida, USA. Art Miami 2011.

2010

Madrid Mirada, 14 Artistas Latinoamericanos. Fototeca de Cuba, Havana, Cuba.

Cuba Avant-Garde: Arte Contemporáneo cubano de la Colección Farber. University of Miami Lowe Art Museum. Florida, USA.

Encuentros. Sala Retiro, Caja Madrid, Spain.

2008

Rodeado de agua: Expresión de Libertad y aislamiento en el arte cubano contemporáneo. Boston University Art Gallery. USA.

CUBA Art History From 1868 To Today. The Montreal Museum of Fine Arts, Canadá.

2007

Cuba Avant Garde: Arte Contemporáneo cubano de la Colección Farber. Harn Museum of Art, Gainesville, Florida, USA

Cuba Avant Garde: Arte Contemporáneo cubano de la Colección Farber. Museo Ringling, Tampa, Florida, USA

Habanart à Québec. Québec, Canadá Homing Devices. Contemporary Art Museum, Tampa, USA

2006

Centro Cultural Banco do Brasil, São Paulo, Rio de Janeiro, Brasilia, Brasil.

2005

Documenting Poetry: Contemporary Latin American Photography. Maier Museum of Art. Virginia, USA.

No Island is an Island: Contemporary Cuban Art, Sawhill Gallery, James Madison University, Harrisonburg, VA.

Contemporary Art and the Art of Survival. Natalie and James Thompson Art Gallery, San José State University. San José, California, USA.

2002

Shifting Tides: Cuban Photography After the Revolution. Museum of Contemporary Photography, Chicago, USA.

2001

Four Cuban Photographers. Couturier Gallery, Los Angeles, Ca.

Shifting Tides: Cuban Photography after the Revolution, Los Angeles County Museum of Art (LACMA) Los Angeles, CA, USA.

Shifting Tides: Cuban Photography After the Revolution. Grey Art Gallery. New York University. New York, USA.

2000

Vigovisións. IX Fotobienal. Vigo, Pontevedra, España.

Subasta Humanitaria, Arte Cubano Contemporáneo. Casa de las Américas. Havana, Cuba.

1999

La huella múltiple. Centro de Desarrollo de las Artes Visuales. Havana, Cuba.

Metáforas / Comentarios. Artistas de Cuba. State University of San Francisco, CA, USA. Lo real infatigable. Fundación Ludwig de Cuba; Centro de Desarrollo de las Artes Visuales, La Habana.

1998

¿Cómo es Possible ser Cubano? La Maison de l'Amérique Latine. Paris, France.

Fragmentos a su Imán. Casa de Las Américas. Havana, Cuba.

1996

Fotografía Cubana. Fotocentre. Unión de Periodistas de Rusia. Moscú, Rusia.

1995

Relaciones peligrosas. Centro de Desarrollo de las Artes Visuales. Havana, Cuba.

Vestigios. Ego: un retrato possible. Centro de Desarrollo de las Artes Visuales. Havana, Cuba.

I Salón Nacional de Arte Cubano Contemporáneo. National Museum of Fine Arts. Havana, Cuba.

Visioni, Fotografía Cubana de los 90. Spazio Italia. Milano, Italia

1994

X Abril Mes de la Fotografía. Mérida, Yucatán, México.

1993

La Nube en Pantalones. National Museum of Fine Arts. Havana, Cuba.

Plástica Cubana Contemporánea de los Ochenta. Museo Universitario del Chopo, México.

1992

Fotografía Cubana Contemporánea. Exposición itinerante. Firenze, Italia.

1991

Nuevas Adquisiciones Contemporáneas. Muestra de Arte Cubano. National Museum of Fine Arts. Havana, Cuba.

IV Bienal de La Habana. L Gallery. Havana, Cuba.

1989

49th International Photographic Salon of Japan. Tokio, Osaka, Nagoya, Kyoto, Sapporo, Fukuoka, Japan.

III Bienal de La Habana. National Museum of Fine Arts. Havana, Cuba.

1988

Jóvenes Fotógrafos. Centro Provincial de Artes Plásticas y Diseño. Havana, Cuba. Pintura Cubana Contemporánea.

1987

El Árbol y la Vida. National Museum of Fine Arts. Havana, Cuba.

Visiones del paisaje. Galería de la Universidad de Los Andes. Mérida, Venezuela

1986

Pintura Cubana Actual. Galería Nacional de Arte Contemporáneo. San José, Costa Rica.

II Bienal de La Habana. National Museum of Fine Arts. Havana, Cuba

1985

De lo Contemporáneo. National Museum of Fine Arts. Havana, Cuba.

1984

Manipulación y Alteración de la Imagen Fotográfica. Consejo Mexicano de la Fotografía. México DF, México.

Concurso Internacional de Carteles de Cine. 23 y M Gallery. Havana, Cuba.

1983

Encuentro de Jóvenes Artistas Latinoamericanos. Casa de Las Américas. Havana, Cuba.

1982

Premio de Fotografía Cubana. 23 y M Gallery. Havana, Cuba.

1981

Volumen I. Centro de Arte Internacional. Havana, Cuba.

Trece Artistas Jóvenes. Havana Gallery. Havana, Cuba.

Sano y Sabroso. 23 y M Gallery. Havana, Cuba.

Cuban Posters, Drawing and Graphics From Cuba. New Delhi, India.

1980

Salón de Pintura Carlos Enríquez. Centro de Arte Internacional. Havana, Cuba.

1979

Pintura Fresca. Artist's Residence. Havana, Cuba.

Pintura Fresca. Cienfuegos Art Gallery. Cienfuegos, Cuba.

1978

Exposición Colectiva de Dibujos. Havana Gallery. Havana, Cuba.

== Awards Selection ==
2016: National Plastic Art Awards

2007: Teaching Special Category as Consultant Teacher, Instituto Superior de Arte, Havana, Cuba.

2001: Award to the Artistic Merit. Instituto Superior de Arte. Havana, Cuba.

1999: Award of the National Culture. Culture Ministry. Havana, Cuba.

1989: Gold Medal. 49th International Photographic Salon of Japan. Tokyo, Japan.
