= Glenda León =

Cuban artist (born 1976)

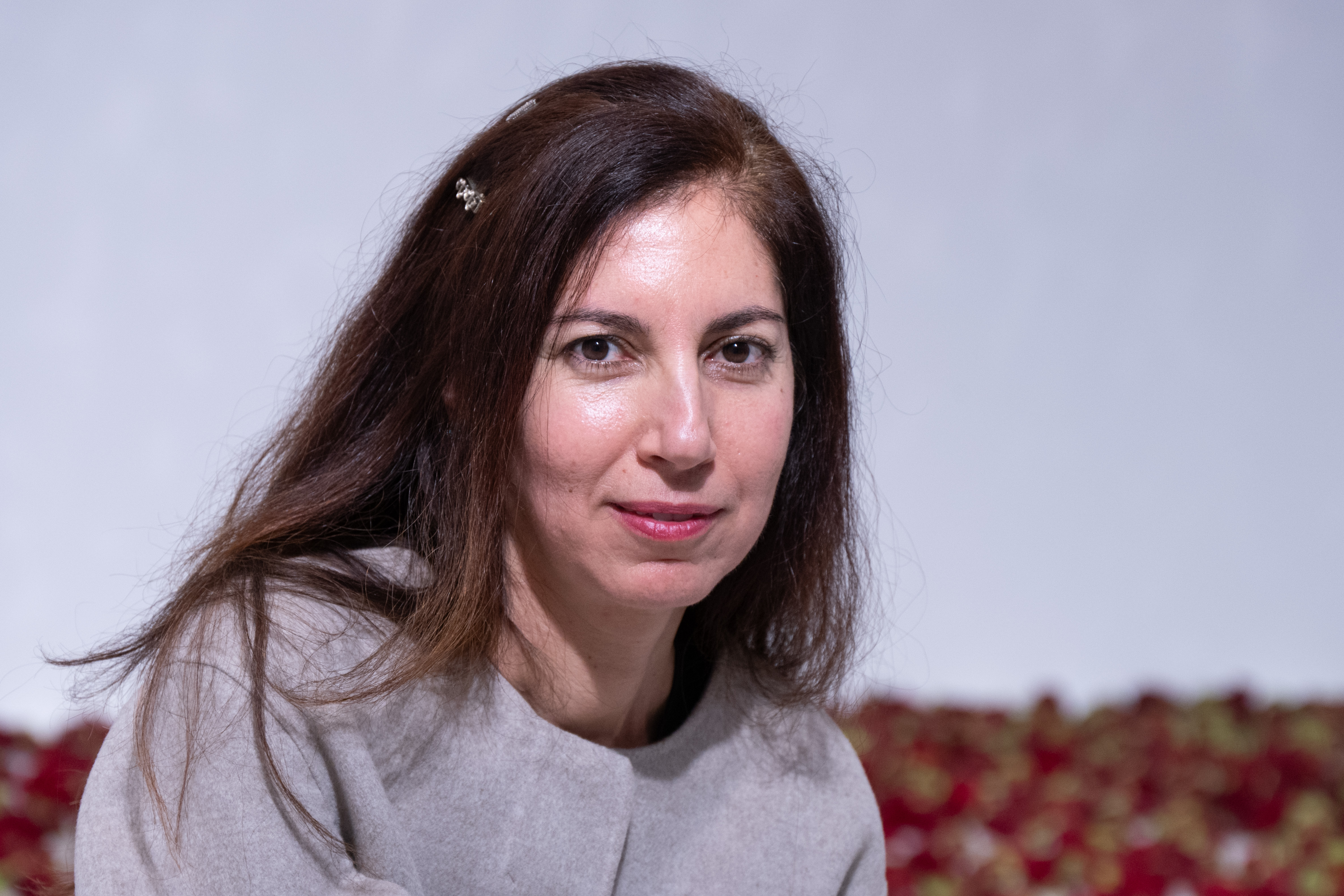
- Born: 1976 (age 49–50); Havana, Cuba
- Known for: Installation art, drawing, photography, public art, video art, artist's books
- Website: www.glenda-leon.com

Glenda León is a Cuban artist born in Havana, in 1976.

León received a graduate degree in visual arts from the Instituto Superior de Arte (ISA) in Havana, while also graduating from the Academy of Media Arts Cologne in Cologne, Germany in 2007. She is noted for her body of work spanning from drawing to video art, including installation, objects, and photography. León is "interested in interstices between visible and invisible, between sound and silence, between ephemeral and eternal." She is currently based in Havana and Madrid.

== Awards ==
Her internationally acclaimed work has received prizes such as The Pollock-Krasner Foundation Award and residencies like Couvent des Recollets, in Paris and Fonderie Darling, in Montreal. Additional international prizes include the Latin American Roaming Art (LARA) award.

== Public collections ==
Her works belong to the permanent collections of the Centre Georges Pompidou, Montreal Museum of Fine Arts, Museo Nacional de Bellas Artes de La Habana, Museum of Fine Arts, Houston, Art Gallery of Ontario, The Hammer Museum, and the Pérez Art Museum Miami.

== Artistic career ==
León began her Visual Art studies at 12 years old and started showing at a professional level in the year 1999. She also studied Classical Ballet and Philology at the University of Havana, where she got a BA in Art History. The very beginning her work appeared new, in the context of Cuban art, because of her peculiar approach to conceptualism. The use of natural and artificial flowers, texts, sounds and materials like hair and chewing gum were part of her first works. For example, her work titled "Chewed Line from Chewed Ideas series" is a photograph of a piece of gum stretched over a wide distance, creating the effect of abstracting the object.

León has exhibited in the Havana and Venice biennials since 2012. Some of her best known installations are Interpreted World, Lost Time and the videos Inversion, Every Breath and Destiny. Her work has been published and reviewed by different art magazines and newspapers such as Bomb Magazine, ArtNexus, ArtForum, ArteCubano among others.

A recurring theme in Léon's work is the juxtaposition of the natural and the artificial. In 2004, Léon conducted a large-scale outdoor installation in Montréal, entitled "Esperanza (Out of Season)", in which she adhered fake branches and leaves to the trees in a public park - a work that only became visible with the passing of the season, as the trees' leaves slowly and naturally dropped away, revealing the imitation branches in stark contrast. Léon reprised this project for Site Santa Fe's 2014 Biennial of the Americas, "Unsettled Landscapes."

Many of Léon's works concern the aesthetics of sound, working with "the space where sound and the visual merge," as she describes it. Her 2012 solo exhibition at Magnan Metz in New York, Listening to Silence, focused on the relationship between the visual world and musical compositions, in a series of works made by superimposing empty musical scores over photographs of nature, suggesting that the visual patterns found in the world - the arrangement of birds in the sky, drops of rain on a sheet of glass, the result of a game of dice - could be "played" like music.

In 2013, she produced a major solo exhibition at the Château des Adhémar, in Montélimar, France, where she exhibited various works on paper, sculptures, and installations, including "Wasted Time," a large pile of sand with an hourglass at the top, representing lost time.

In 2013 she took part in the Cuban Pavilion at the 55th Venice Biennial, where she showed a project entitled Music of the Spheres, a spherical glass music box suspended from the ceiling that played a 30-second, looped composition whose musical notes relate to the position of the planets in the Solar System on a given day.

Every Sound Is a Shape of Time, a collections-based exhibition at the Pérez Art Museum Miami in 2024, curated by Franklin Sirmans, borrowed its title from an artwork by León, who exhibited alongside seventeen other modern and contemporary artists and their artworks collected for over three decades, from the museum founding to the present.

== Exhibitions ==
=== Selected solo exhibitions ===
- 2016: Galeria Juana de Aizpuru, Madrid, Spain
- 2020: Changwon Sculpture Biennale
- 2015: Centro Atlántico de Arte Moderno
- 2021: Arte Contemporánea de Vigo
- 2020: Museo Extremeño e Iberoamericano de Arte Contemporáneo
- 2022: Aichi Triennale
- 2021:15th Cuenca Biennial
- 2021: Guangzhou Image Triennial
- 2018: Dakar Biennale
- 2021: Pilar Juncosa and Sotheby’s Biennial Award for Artistic Creation
- 2020: DKV Prize
- 2005 & 2020: Pollock-Krasner Foundation Grant

=== Selected group exhibitions ===
- 2015: Havana Biennal, Havana, Cuba
- 2014: SITElines 2014: Unsettled Landscapes, Site Santa Fe, Santa Fe, NM
- 2013: 55th Venice Biennale, Venice, Italy
- 2000: First National Festival of Video Art at The Ludwig Foundation of Cuba
- 2023: Protection No Longer Assured at Espacio SOLO - Colección SOLO museum.
