= Juan Carlos Alom =

Cuban photographer

- Born: December 1964 (age 61); Havana, Cuba
- Occupations: Photographer, filmmaker.
- Years active: 1990–
- Known for: Photographing, filmmaking

Juan Carlos Alom (born December 1964) is a Cuban photographer and filmmaker.

== Biography ==
Juan Carlos Alom was born in December 1964 in Havana, Cuba. He has been active since the beginning of the 1990’s. Alom worked with a distinctive visual language in his photos, which empathized symbolism, improvisation, and an overall connection to Cuba’s culture and landscapes.

In 2023, Alom was the Mellon Artist in Residence at Hemisphere Institute, from the Hemispheric Institute of Performance & Politics New York University.

== Education ==
In 1989, Juan Carlos Alom received a formal education at two institutions: The Studio of Restoration of Photographic Images at the Cuban Photographic Library, and the Studio of Manipulated Photography at the Cuban Photographic Library. One year later in 1990, he also attended the Semiotic Studio of Urban Environment at the International Institute of Journalism. These schools were located in Havana, where he studied restoring film negatives and photographic images. He studied under a photographer named Gerardo Suter, which is where he learned the importance of symbolism in photos, which would later become one of the most defining aspects of his work.

== Nacimiento de una Tierra (Birth of a Land) ==
Alom’s work mainly centered around Afro-Cuban religious practices. One of his series, titled Nacimiento de una Tierra(Birth of a Land) from 2010, details a ritual held by an all male religious secret society known as the Abakuá. In an interview with Iberia Pérez González, Alom describes that the ritual was held in memory of two members of the brotherhood that had passed, and he was asked to document the ritual in order to share it with members located in the United States. In the series, Alom captures the intricate connection between music, dance, and spiritual symbolism illustrated in the ritual. Something important worth noting is Alom’s authenticity, with him respecting the secrecy of the Abakuá’s practices, embracing the limitations of documenting these secret practices.

== El libro oscuro (The Dark Book) and The Special Period ==
Another important series Alom worked on is El libro oscuro (The Dark Book) which was shot from 1991 to 1995. For Cuba, the 1990’s was known as “The Special Period.” Up to this point, Cuba’s economy had been relying on the Soviet Union, and when the Soviet Union collapsed in 1991, Cuba’s economy was severely effected. Resources like film and other photographic materials were very scarce, so Alom was forced to ration the resources he had. He learned how to use expired film and X-Ray chemicals to continue his work. Due to the properties of old film, his pictures appeared much darker and dreamlike. The main focus of “The Dark Book” centered around Afro-Cuban Myths.

== Artistic style ==
Most of Alom’s photos are made using black-and-white film rather than color film. In an interview, Alom reveals why: It was the type of film he used when he started his photography journey, and he admired its simplicity. Black and white film was easy to come by and it was faster to develop than color film. Alom preferred to spend as little time as possible on developing, giving him more time to focus on his goal.

== Solo exhibitions ==
Alom's work has been exhibited in Latin America, the Caribbean, North America, Europe, and South Africa.

- 2013 – 1989-2012 Fotografías de Juan Carlos Alom, BuzzArt, Miami
- 2009 – Esperamos en el Monte Claro, Galería Villa Manuela, Havana, Cuba
- 2003 – Ritual a la Ceiba. 8th Havana Biennial, Cuba
- 2001 – Shifting Tides: Cuban photography after the Revolution. Tim B. Wride, Los Angeles County Museum of Art, Los Angeles
- 2001 – Sombras Espesas. Throckmorton Gallery, New York City.
- 2000 – Sombras Secretas, Throckmorton Fine Art, New York City
- 1998 – Iturralde Gallery, West Hollywood, California
- 1996 – " The Dark Book/El Libro Oscuro. Juan Carlos Alom", Throckmorton Fine Art, Inc., New York City
- 1996 – "El voluble rostro de la realidad ", Centro de Desarrollo de las Artes Visuales(CDAV), Havana
- 1995 – "Arenas Movedizas" together with Luis Gómez this was part of a very large visual event "Una de Cada Clase" organized by Ludwig Foundation in Cuba
- 1990 – "Laura", Fototeca de Cuba, Havana

== Group exhibitions ==
- 2024 – "Attitüde", Fabian & Claude Walter Galerie, Zurich
- 2020 – Allied with Power: African and African Diaspora Art from the Jorge M. Pérez Collection, Pérez Art Museum Miami
- 2004 – "Mapas Abiertos, 100 Años de la Fotografía Latinoamericana", Fundación Telefónica, Madrid, Spain
- 2004 – "Mapas Abiertos, 100 Años de la Fotografía Latinoamericana"; Palau de la Virreina, Barcelona, Spain
- 1999 – "Queloides", Centro de Desarrollo de las Artes Visuales, Havana, Cuba
- 1999 – "Latinoamérica 92", Kuntbysningen, Denmark

== Screenings ==
- 2009 – Experimental video and video art: Artists from Cuba. Museo D'Antioquia, Colombia
- 2009 – Diario. Salle Zero, Alianza Francesa, Havana, Cuba.
- 2008 – Habana Solo. Visionarios, Audiovisual en Latinoamérica, São Paulo: Itaú Cultural, Brazil
- 2008 – Las ciudades invisibles, Videos sobre Arte, Arquitectura y Ciudad. Colegio Territorial de Arquitectos, Valencia, Spain
- 2007 – Ultramar, Videoartistas hispanoamericanos. Centro Cultural São Paulo, Brazil
- 2007 – Habana Solo. Ambulante Gira de Documentales, Mexico
- 2006 – Fast Forward III, 28 Festival Internacional del Nuevo Cine Latinoamericano, Havana, Cuba
- 2004 – Presentación de Habana Solo, 15 min en película de 16 mm. Video Marathon. Museo del Barrio, New York City
- 2004 – Pabellón Cuba, 35 mm b/n 54´. 8th Havana Biennial, Cuba.
- 2004 – Iroko. 16 mm b/n 15´. Ciudadela La California. 8th Havana Biennial, Cuba.
- 2003 – 17e Encontres video art plastique. Wharf Centre d'Art Contemporain de Basse Normandie, France

== Collections ==
- Pérez Art Museum Miami, Florida
- Los Angeles County Museum of Art, California
- Walker Art Center, Minneapolis
- Ludwig Forum for International Art, Germany
- Fototeca de Cuba, Havana
- IF, Milan, Italy
- Bronx Museum, New York City
- FOTOFEST, Houston, Texas
- Southeast Museum of Photography, Daytona Beach, Florida

== Publications ==
- Osvaldo Salas, Roberto Salas, & Gregory Tozian. Fidel's Cuba: A Revolution in Pictures; (Atria Books/Beyond Words 1999); ISBN 978-1-56025-245-0
- José Veigas-Zamora, Cristina Vives Gutierrez, Adolfo V. Nodal, Valia Garzon, Dannys Montes de Oca. Memoria: Cuban Art of the 20th Century; (California/International Arts Foundation 2001); ISBN 978-0-917571-11-4
- José Veigas. Memoria: Artes Visuales Cubanas Del Siglo Xx; (California Intl Arts 2004); ISBN 978-0-917571-12-1
