= Queloides =

Queloides is an ongoing cultural and curatorial project in Cuban art that seeks to highlight the persistence of racist stereotypes and ideas of racial difference in Cuban society and culture. Initiated in 1997 by artist Alexis Esquivel and by art critic Omar Pascual Castillo, who organized the exhibit Queloides I Parte, the project was later led by the late art critic Ariel Ribeaux Diago, who organized two important additional exhibits: Ni músicos ni deportistas (“Neither musicians nor athletes,” 1997), for which he wrote an award-winning essay, and Queloides (1999). Queloides or keloids are raised scars that, as many in Cuba believe, appear most frequently on the black skin. The title makes reference to the scars of racism, on the one hand, and to persistent popular beliefs that there are "natural" differences between whites and blacks.

The main purpose of these exhibits was to initiate a public conversation around topics that had been taboo in Cuban public spaces for decades. As Alexis Esquivel (2005) explained, “I, as well as other colleagues had many questions and concerns about racial prejudice in Cuba, and I was convinced that through art we could express a valuable and instructive point of view... In Queloides we paid attention to… a non-romanticized vision of the daily existence of Cuban blacks… The artists focused on the black person as a marginalized individual faced with economic disadvantages, traumas, and self reflection.”

Although these were groundbreaking cultural events that addressed issues of race and discrimination in Cuban society, they received very little coverage in the Cuban press and were quickly forgotten. In 2010 historian Alejandro de la Fuente and artist Elio Rodríguez Valdés organized a new edition of the exhibit, titled Queloides: Race and Racism in Cuban Contemporary Art. This exhibit opened at the Centro Wifredo Lam in Havana in April 2010 and was later presented at the Mattress Factory Museum in Pittsburgh, The 8th Floor Gallery in New York City, and the Neil L. and Angelica Zander Rudenstine Gallery at the W.E.B. Du Bois Institute for African American Research at Harvard University. The Cuban media ignored the exhibit again, but Queloides received widespread press coverage outside Cuba, including favorable reviews in leading art journals such as ArtNews, Art in America, ArtDaily and ArtNexus. The Pittsburgh Post-Gazette called it "a ground-breaking exhibition" and listed it as number four in the " year's best art" in the city in 2010. In 2011 the important Cuban journal Artecubano published its own review of Queloides.

Referring to Queloides: Race and Racism in Cuban Contemporary Art, literary scholar Ana Belén Martín-Sevillano (2011) has written: "The impact of the Queloides sequence in the cultural field has made the term synonymous with the racial debate in Cuba. Designed with a comprehensive and inclusive view, one of the exhibit's major achievements has been to include representative artwork that covers the diverse array of techniques and strategies used in contemporary Cuban art to address the complexity of the cultural and social processes of racialization. Furthermore, the 2010 Queloides exhibit included the work of three women artists who had not participated in the previous shows: Belkis Ayón, Maria Magdalena Campos Pons, and Marta María Pérez Bravo. The work of these artist offers a compelling approach to issues of race and gender."

== Sources ==
de la Fuente, Alejandro (2008). "The New Afro-Cuban Cultural Movement and the Debate on Race in Contemporary Cuba," Journal of Latin American Studies 40:4 (November), 697–720.

de la Fuente, Alejandro, ed (2011). Queloides: Race and Racism in Cuban Contemporary Art. Pittsburgh: Mattress Factory. ISBN 978-0822961529

Casamayor Cisneros, Odette (2011). "Queloides: Inevitables, Lacerantes. En torno a la exposición Queloides: Raza y Racismo en el Arte Cubano Contemporáneo," Artecubano 2:22-26.

Esquivel, Alexis (2005). “Queloide, la cicatriz dormida (Keloid, the Dormant Scar),” in Judith Bettelheim, Afrocuba Works on Paper 1968–2003. San Francisco: San Francisco State University. ISBN 978-0295984766

Fernandes, Sujatha (2006). Cuba Represent!: Cuban Arts, State Power, and the Making of New Revolutionary Cultures. Duke University Press. ISBN 978-0822338918

Martín-Sevillano, Ana Belén (2011). "Crisscrossing Gender, Ethnicity and Race: African Religious Legacy in Cuban Contemporary's Women's Art," Cuban Studies 42:136-54.
