= Alom (surname) =

Alom is a surname. Notable people with the surname include:

- Hero Alom, Bangladeshi freelancer music video model and actor active on social media
- Juan Carlos Alom (born 1964), Cuban photographer and experimental filmmaker
- Nelson Alom (born 1990), Indonesian footballer
- Nerius Alom (born 1994), Indonesian footballer
- Saiful Alom, Bengali politician
