= Hauterives =

- Commune
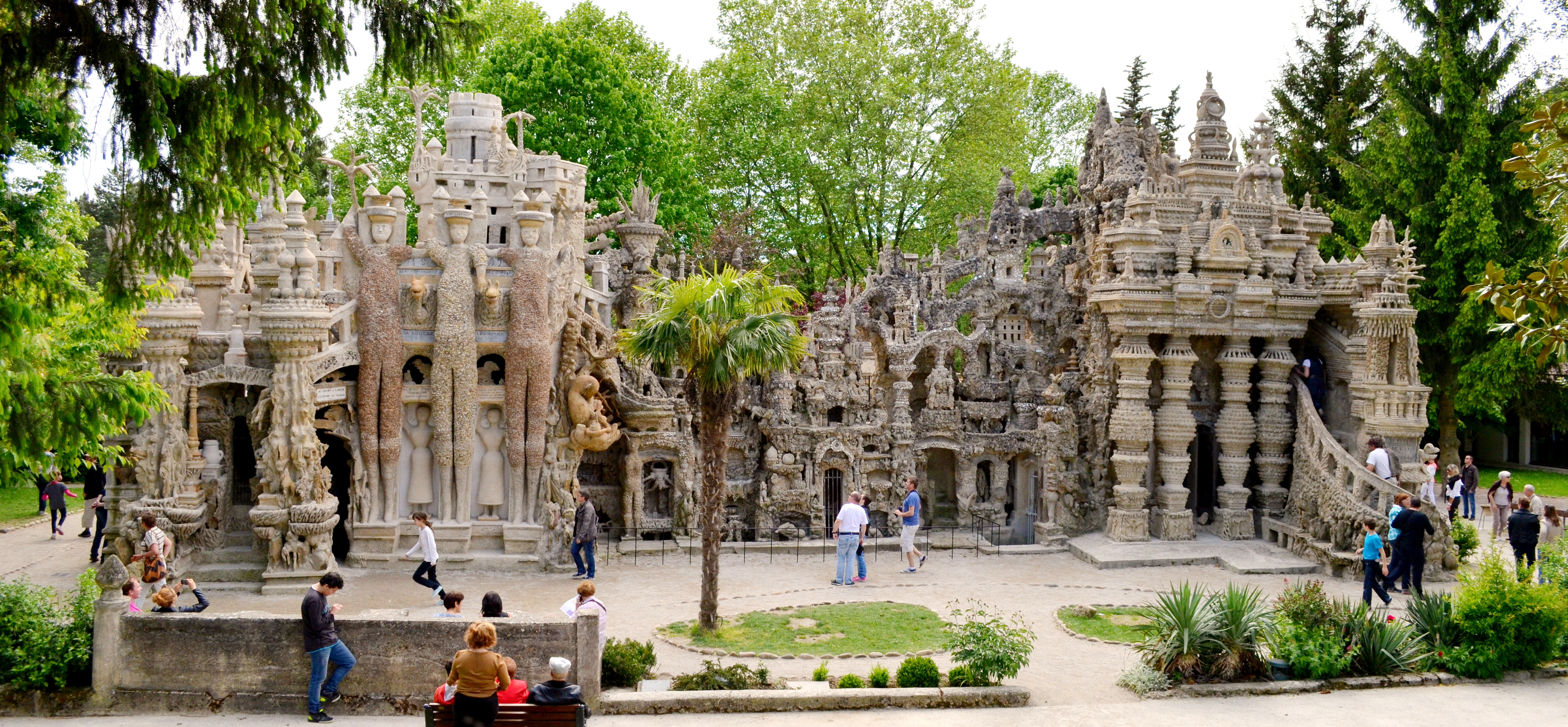
- Cheval's "Palais Idéal"

- Coat of arms
- Location of Hauterives
- Location within France Location within Auvergne-Rhône-Alpes
- Coordinates: 45°15′22″N 5°01′38″E
- Country: France
- Region: Auvergne-Rhône-Alpes
- Department: Drôme
- Arrondissement: Valence
- Canton: Drôme des collines

Government
  - Mayor (2020–2026): Florent Brunet
- Area^{1}: 30.51 km^{2} (11.78 sq mi)
- Elevation: 346 m (1,135 ft)
- Highest elevation: 506 m (1,660 ft)
- Lowest elevation: 269 m (883 ft)
- Population (2023): 1,904
  - Density: 62.41/km^{2} (161.6/sq mi)
- Time zone: UTC+01:00 (CET)
  - Summer (DST): UTC+02:00 (CEST)
- INSEE/Postal code: 26148 /26390
- ^{1} French Land Register data, which excludes lakes, ponds, glaciers > 1 km^{2} (0.386 sq mi or 247 acres) and river estuaries.

Hauterives (French pronunciation: [otʁiv]) is a commune in the Drôme department in southeastern France. It is home to Ferdinand Cheval's self-made Palais idéal.

== Geography ==
The Galaure flows southwest through the middle of the commune.

== Population ==
Historical population
Year	Pop.	±% p.a.
1968	1,123	—
1975	1,081	−0.54%
1982	1,096	+0.20%
1990	1,202	+1.16%
1999	1,333	+1.16%
2007	1,558	+1.97%
2012	1,759	+2.46%
2017	1,895	+1.50%
2023	1,904	+0.08%
Source: INSEE

== See also ==
- Communes of the Drôme department
