= Esterio Segura Mora =

- Born: August 22, 1970; Santiago de Cuba, Cuba
- Occupation: Artist

Esterio Segura Mora (born August 22, 1970 in Santiago de Cuba, Cuba) is a Cuban artist.

== Education ==
From a very young age, Mora had an immense interest in visual arts. From 1982 to 1985 he studied at the Escuela Elemental de Artes Plásticas of Camaguey, Cuba, and next studied at the Escuela Provincial de Artes Plásticas y Ballet, also in Camaguey. In 1989 he began his instruction at the Instituto Superior de Arte (I.S.A) in Havana, which he finished in 1994.

== Career ==
Mora worked as a professor at the Escuela Provincial de Artes Plásticas y Ballet in Camaguey. In 1993, together with Carlos Garaicoa, he undertook the curatorial design of the exhibition Las Metáforas del Templo that took place at the Centro de Desarrollo de las Artes Visuales in Havana. Since 1995 he has been a member of the Unión de Escritores y Artistas de Cuba (UNEAC). Sculpture, drawing and installation are his main vehicles of artistic endeavor.

== Individual exhibitions ==
His first solo exhibition took place in the Escuela Provincial de Artes Plásticas y Ballet, Camagüey, Cuba in 1986. In 1996 the show Bird and Fish: In the Freezer was seen at the Gasworks Studios, London. In 1997 he showed Habanos libres y yo. Fotografías y dibujos at the Fundación Ludwig de Cuba, Havana. In 1999 he presented Espacio ocupado por un sueño at Centro Wifredo Lam in Havana.

== Collective exhibitions ==
Among the collective exhibitions was La Misión, seen at the Dominico San Juan de Letrán Convent Gallery, Havana, in 1992. In 1993 Mora was part of an important and famous exhibition, Las metáforas del templo at the Centro de Desarrollo de las Artes Visuales in Havana. Una de Cada Clase was the name of an exhibition in 1995 organized by the Ludwig Foundation of Cuba. In 1998 he was in the show La isla a flote at the Der Brücke Gallery, Buenos Aires, Argentina. In 1999 he presented Trabajando p’al inglé at the Concourse Gallery, Barbican Center, London.

== Awards ==
In 1988 Mora won the Prize of Unión de Escritores y Artistas de Cuba (UNEAC). In 1992 he obtained a Mention in the National Triannial of small sculpture at the Centro de Desarrollo de las Artes Visuales, Havana. Between 1995 and 1996 he was Artist in Residence at the Gaswork Studio, London. In 1997 he was Artist in Residence at the Ludwig Forum für Internationale Kunst, Aachen, Germany.

== Collections ==
His works can be found in the Museo Nacional de Bellas Artes de La Habana, the Pérez Art Museum Miami, the Kendall Art Center, the Rodriguez Collection, Miami, Florida, the New Museum of Latin American Art, University of Essex, Essex, UK and in the Tampa Museum of Art, Tampa, Florida.
