= Danielle Jacqui =

French "Singular" Artist

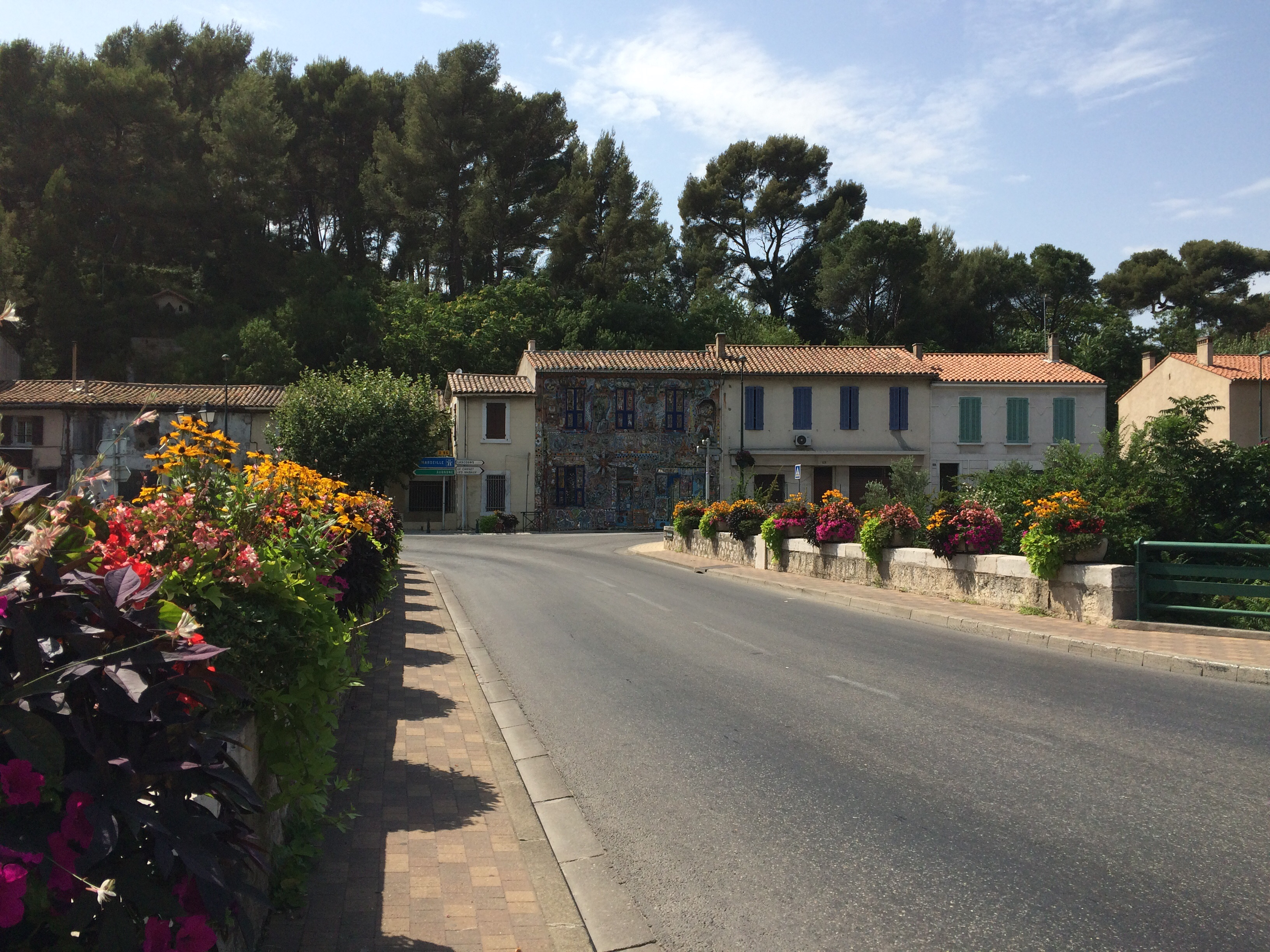
- "The House of the Painter" from the bridge of the Huveaune

Danielle Jacqui, known as "Celle qui peint (The Painter)", is a French painter and sculptor, born 2 February 1934 in Nice. She lives in Roquevaire, Bouches-du-Rhône, France, where she is known for having entirely decorated her house. She founded the International Festival of Marginal Art in Aubagne, and she is an emblematic figure in the movement derived from Outsider art.

== Early life and education ==
Danielle Jacqui's father was a jeweller and her mother a feminist activist. The sudden breakup of her parents was a blow which followed by her being placed in boarding school, and later entrusted to the care of a couple, both teachers, in 1945. Her studies were uneven until the end of the second year of secondary school, when she quit school to marry at the age of 18. She eventually raised four children.

== From job to art career ==
Following a divorce in 1970, she became an antiques dealer, a profession that gave her a tactile sense, through objects, and among other things, a taste for recycling. She presented objects that she had found and restored, as well as her paintings, assemblages and unusual embroideries., From this time onwards, she produced paintings, which she began to show. In 1990, she founded and organized the Aubagne International Festival of Marginal Art.

== Major works ==
=== The House of the Painter ===
In 1985 Jacqui moved into a house in Roquevaire, and began investing all of her efforts into her living space, transforming her house bit by bit into a total work of art, by means of various techniques which she combined, one with another. She opened her house-artwork to the public. Jacqui calls herself a singular artist and refutes the reference to Art Brut, because of her openness to the world: "Contrary to the definition of Art Brut, which consists of talking about people who are cut off from the outside world, I am in a state of Art Brut because I am cut off by necessity on my site, and immersed in my work".

=== ORGANuGAMME ===
Colossal d’Art Brut ORGANuGAMME II, on display at Ferme des Tilleuls.

In November 2006, she was invited to a residency in ceramic arts in Aubagne, where she conceived of and pursued an artwork covering several hundred square metres. These sculptures in stoneware ceramics were to form ORGANuGAMME, a monumental work continued under her supervision. This enormous work would be abandoned in the end by the City of Aubagne during a change of municipality in 2014. Partially presented in 2021 at the Musée d'Arts Brut in Montpellier, this monumental work found, thanks to the intervention of Mario Del Curto, a photographer specializing in the field of art brut, a destination on the site of the Ferme des Tilleuls in Switzerland. This piece, composed of 36 tons of ceramics and to which the artist devoted 10 years of work, was thus bequeathed to the Fondation de la Ferme des Tilleuls and the City of Renens in Switzerland. The transport of the work was carried out thanks to a committee of honour with the participation of Michel Thévoz. The artist has been working since 2015 on installation at the site, in collaboration with the architect Gilles Décosterd, on an original and modular structure of 27 assembled totems. The construction work began on the site of the Ferme des Tilleuls in September 2020 and was dedicated on 5 November 2022.

Jacqui makes a regular practice of writing, in particular a journal "bulletin de celle qui peint" since 1998, of which she makes a handwritten edition of about ten copies, several times a year.

Jacqui's career and work is documented, in collaboration with the artist, in "documents d'artistes, Région Provence-Alpes-Cote d'Azur".

The Regional Directorate of Cultural Affairs undertook, in November 2021, to register her house in Roquevraire as a historical monument.

== Public and private collections ==
- Musée de la Création Franche (Bègles)
- Musée International d'art naïf Anatole Jakovsky (Nice),
- Collection de l'art brut, Lausanne, Suisse
- Musée de l'art en marche, Lapalisse et Hauterives
- Folk Art Museum (New York)
- Banana Factory, Bethlehem, Pennsylvania
- American Visionary Art Museum, Baltimore, Maryland
