= Marta María Pérez Bravo =

Cuban artist (born 1959)

- Born: 1959 (age 66–67); Havana, Cuba
- Education: Academia Nacional de Bellas Artes San Alejandro; Instituto Superior de Arte
- Known for: Photography, Self-portraiture
- Movement: Contemporary art

Marta María Pérez Bravo (born 1959) is a Cuban artist who is best known for her black-and-white self-portraiture, in which she often uses her own body as the central subject-object to express her own belief in and practice of Afro-Cuban religions, particularly Santeria and Palo Monte. Much of her art is informed by this practice, and engages with the themes of ritual, motherhood and femininity, expressed through the highly stylized posing of her body, which is placed in relation to personally and ritually significant objects in her self-portraits.

== Education ==
Pérez Bravo initially studied painting in Havana at the San Alejandro Academy of Fine Arts (1979) and the Instituto Superior de Arte (1984). She became interested in photography while working on her senior thesis at San Alejandro Academy, and since has been using photography as her primary medium. She lived in Havana until 1995 when she moved to Monterrey, Mexico, with her family, where she currently resides and works. Pérez Bravo was part of a generation of Cuban artists born immediately following the Cuban Revolution and was one of those who went into exile following the collapse of the Special Period at the end of the 1980s.

== Work ==
Pérez Bravo's work is usually staged, small-format black-and-white photographs where she uses her body as a vessel to express her cultural and religious perspective. She is deeply connected to her cultural background, especially the religious belief of the Afro-Caribbean Santería. The Santería believe that the divine exists in all things, even in everyday objects. These objects are often "votive offerings and other elements of popular lore" of her Cuban culture. This is why Pérez Bravo chooses such familiar objects such as rope, branches, and animal parts to express the divine nature of all things. Her photographs attempt to express her own spiritual path, documenting her progress through abstract and dream-like staged photographs. Although her spiritual path itself remains vague, we are given a glimpse into her divine experiences. This is done primarily by her transformation of her own body alternatively into an altar or an offering, or a vehicle for sacred meaning. There is an emphasis on the exploration and performance of both spiritual and physical power in Pérez Bravo’s self-portraiture, which together “remythify” the female body and notions of femininity. Her photos are often grounded in her own lived experiences of worship and womanhood, especially the expression of maternity, desire and death, which she expresses through manipulation and presentation of her physical body.

For example, a large part of her work also consists of self-portraits that are intended to "demystify" motherhood. Her challenges in childbirth served as the inspiration for her series Para concebir (To conceive) (1985) and Memories of Our Baby (1990). These series attempt to demystify motherhood by showing her body in ways that are intended to challenge the worshiping of sensual beauty. One method she uses to accomplish this is to depict her body in circumstances of physical violence. Her practice of Santería, which emphasizes duality, allows for the existence of this contextualized violence and spirituality in the same image, while also transforming Pérez Bravo’s body into a sacred site in and of itself. Her photographs explore what it means to be female contrary to patriarchal stereotypes.

Pérez Bravo's work has immense personal meaning, reflecting as it does her life and beliefs, but has also been interpreted as having a broader significance. Her portraiture, for its extensive use of Afro-Caribbean religious symbols, has been viewed as a protest against the marginalization or "folklorization" of Afro-Cuban traditions, done through the artist's exploration of her own identity in depictions of her literally embodied experiences of race, gender, and ethnicity. Peréz Bravo's exploration of identity challenges notions of colonialism, racism, and patriarchal authority as she attempts to combine the social, political, cultural, historical, and popular aspects of her own personal experiences in her portraiture.

Bravo's work has been displayed all over the world including Cuba at the IV Havana Biennial, the V Istanbul Biennial in Turkey and the Gwangju Bienniale in South Korea. Her work has been also included in many museum exhibitions such as the San Francisco Museum of Modern Art, El Museo del Barrio, New York, United States, Museum of Contemporary Art, Brisbane, Australia, Fridericianum, Kassel, Germany, Hall of Art, Budapest, Hungary, Alejandro Otero Museum of Visual Arts, Caracas, Venezuela, Winnipeg Art Gallery, and the National Art Gallery of Canada in Ottawa, Menil Collection in Houston, Louisiana Museum for Moderne Kunst, Copenhagen, Denmark, Museum of Fine Arts, Houston, Texas, Wichita Art Museum, Kansas, New Mexico Museum of Art, Santa Fe, New Mexico, Mead Art Museum, Amherst, Massachusetts, Pérez Art Museum Miami, and the Kendall Art Center in Miami, Florida, the Los Angeles County Museum of Art, and the Samuel P. Harn Museum of Art, University of Florida, Gainesville, Florida.
