= Belkis Ayón =

Cuban visual artist (1967–1999)

- Born: 23 January 1967; Havana, Cuba
- Died: 11 September 1999 (aged 32); Havana, Cuba
- Known for: Collagraphy
- Movement: Cuban art
- Awards: Cuban Prize for National Cultural Distinction (1996) the Biennial of San Juan Prize for Latin American and Caribbean Engraving (1997) International Prize at the International Graphics Biennale in Maastricht, the Netherlands (1993)
- Website: https://en.belkisayon.org/la-artista

Belkis Ayón (23 January 1967 – 11 September 1999) was a Cuban printmaker who specialized in the technique of collagraphy. Ayón created large, highly detailed allegorical collagraphs based on Abakuá, a secret, all-male Afro-Cuban society. Her work is often in black and white, consisting of ghost-white figures with oblong heads and empty, almond-shaped eyes, set against dark, patterned backgrounds.

== Early life ==
Belkis Ayón was born in Havana, Cuba in 1967. From 1979 to 1982, she attended 20 de Octubre Elementary School of the Arts in Havana. For four years from 1982 to 1986 she attended San Alejandro Academy, Havana. From 1986 to 1991, Ayón attended the prestigious Instituto Superior de Arte in Havana where she gained a bachelor's degree in Engraving, and joined its faculty after graduation.

== Career ==
A central theme of Ayón's art is Abakuá, a secret, exclusively male association with a complex mythology that informs their rites and traditions. The fraternal society began in Nigeria at Cross River and Akwa Ibom and was brought to Haiti and Cuba through the slave trade in the 19th century.

Ayón researched the history of Abakuá extensively, with special emphasis on the most prominent and only female figure in the religion, Princess Sikan. According to a central Abakuán myth, Sikan once accidentally captured Tanze, an enchanted fish which imparted great power to those who heard its voice. When she took the fish to her father, he warned her to remain silent and never speak of it again. She did divulge the information however, to her fiancé, leader of an enemy tribe. Her punishment was a death sentence and with her, Tanze also died.

This story comes in the form of imposed silence in her work, a major theme. The concept of imposed silence is evident in the lack of mouths in all of her figures. Belkis Ayón demonstration of Sikan's betrayal in her collagraphs may be considered a transgression because, ironically, Ayon, a female artist, gives voice to the main antagonist Sikan, a woman, in Abakua mythology, which traditionally prohibits women. In this way, Belkis rebelled against the sexist and patriarchal culture argued to be ingrained in Cuban society by highlighting the religion's feminine presence.

To date, Ayón has been the only prominent artist to create an extensive body of work based on the Abakuán society. Because the society itself had created very few visual representations of its myths, Ayón had great freedom to visually interpret their myths for herself. Numerous Abakuán rituals are represented in her collagraphs, many of which draw on Christian as well as Afro-Cuban traditions. Abakuán beliefs existed in sharp contrast to the atheistic anti-religious position of the Cuban communist government at the time.

== Style and technique ==
Ayón dedicated herself to collagraphy, a printmaking technique for making works on paper. After the fall of the Soviet Union, supplies became difficult for artists to find. She painstakingly attached materials of widely differing textures (for example, vegetable peelings, bits of paper, acrylic, and abrasives) to a cardboard substrate, painting over the matrix to create dimension. Finally, running the resulting elaborate collage through a hand-cranked printing press. She often painted or carved the resulting prints, creating intricate patterns and areas of embossing that added even more depth and texture. Her works masterfully combine figuration and areas of abstract patterning, which sometimes complement and, at other times, camouflage the forms of her figures. Towards the end of Ayón's career, she worked on a large scale, sometimes joining as many as 18 sheets together to construct a single image, or attaching oversized prints to an armature that would give them architectural volume, towering over viewers.

Ayón is best known for working mainly in black, white, and shades of gray. In these prints, stark and haunting white figures are dramatically contrasted with dark images and backgrounds. The prints feature both animals — such as snakes, fish, and goats — and human forms, references to art history, and religious iconography. Notable examples of her works include Longing (1988), Resurrection (1998) and Untitled ("Black figure carrying a white one") (1996). She did, however, use vibrant colors in some of her early works and in studies for prints. A notable example is La Cena (1991), a large-scale print for which she created a study in bright pink, red, yellow and green. Other examples of full-color work include Nasako Began (1986), Syncretism I (1986), and Careful Women! Sikan Careful!! (1987).

By disrupting the male-dominated Abakuán mythology through the creation of a more egalitarian iconography, Ayón defied society's norms. To do this she sometimes mixed images from the Abakuán and Christian religions, as in Giving and Taking (1997). In this work she depicted a Christian priest or saint with a white halo and a red robe next to an Abakuán figure clothed in black, with a black diamond behind his head. She sometimes replaced male figures with female figures, as in La Cena, where she portrayed some of the disciples at the Last Supper with ambiguously gendered figures. She also replaced Jesus with the image of Sikan.

== Exhibitions and residencies ==
Ayón's work has been shown widely internationally. She has been featured in group exhibitions in Canada, South Korea, the Netherlands and Spain (2010). In 1993, she exhibited at the 16th Venice Biennale and won the international prize at the International Graphics Biennale in Maastricht, the Netherlands. Other Biennials she attended include the Havana Biennial, Bharat Bhavan International Biennial of Prints in India, and the San Juan, Puerto Rico Biennial of Latin American and Caribbean Engraving in which she was awarded a prize as well.

In 1998 Ayón received four residencies in the United States working at Temple University's Tyler School of Art, Philadelphia College of Art, Rhode Island School of Design, and at the Brandywine Workshop. The same year she was elected vice-president of the Association of Plastic Artists of National Union of Writers and Artists of Cuba.

== Collections ==
Her work can now be found in the permanent collections of a number of museums, including the Museum of Contemporary Art Los Angeles and the Museum of Modern Art in New York. From 2 October 2016 to 12 February 2017, the Fowler Museum staged Ayón's first solo museum exhibition with the help of her estate; the exhibition subsequently traveled to El Museo del Barrio in New York and the Kemper Museum of Contemporary Art in Kansas City, and was widely well received. The first retrospective of her work in Europe showed 90 pieces of her work at the Reina Sofia museum in Madrid from 2021 until April 2022. Ayón's work Untitled (Sikán with White Tips), a monochromatic print made in 1993, is also featured in the collection of the Pérez Art Museum Miami (PAMM). In 2023, the National Gallery of Art in Washington, DC acquired her painting Sin titulo [Mujer en posición fetal] (Untitled, Woman in fetal position), 1996.

== Death ==
Ayón died by suicide of a gunshot to the head at home in Havana on 11 September 1999. She was 32. Reasons for her suicide still remain a mystery to her friends and family. However, The New York Times obituary quotes her as saying of her art, in the year that she died:

These [works] are the things I have inside that I toss out because there are burdens with which you cannot live or drag along, ...Perhaps that is what my work is about — that after so many years, I realize the disquiet.

== Videos ==
- "Belkis Ayón: A Documentary Video Work in Progress", Fowler Museum, 26 September 2016
- "Belkis Ayon", 9 December 2012
