= José Antonio =

José Antonio is a common pairing of personal names in Spanish and Portuguese, and may refer to:

== Arts ==
- Antonio Banderas, full name José Antonio Domínguez Bandera (born 1960), Spanish actor
- José Antonio Abreu (1939–2018), Venezuelan musician, educator and activist
- José Antonio Bottiroli (1920–1990), Argentine composer and poet
- José Antonio Bowen (born 1962), Spanish-American musician, author and academic
- José Antonio Burciaga (1940–1996), American artist and writer
- José Antonio Cotrina (born 1972), Spanish writer
- José Antonio Dávila (1898–1941), Puerto Rican postmodern poet
- José António Duro (1875–1899), Portuguese poet
- José Antonio Molina (born 1960), Dominican conductor and composer
- José Antonio Muñoz (born 1942), Argentine artist
- José Antonio Porcel (1715–1794), Spanish poet and writer
- José Antonio Santesteban (1835–1906), Spanish composer
- José Antonio Sistiaga (born 1932), Spanish artist and filmmaker
- José Antonio Torres (director) (born 1973), Mexican film director and musician
- José Antonio Torres Martinó (1916–2011), Puerto Rican artist and writer
- José Antonio Zapata (painter) (1762–1837), Spanish painter
- José Antonio Velásquez (1906–1983), Honduran painter
- Pepe Aguilar, full name José Antonio Aguilar Jiménez (born 1968), American singer-songwriter and actor
- Tony Plana, full name José Antonio Plana (born 1952), Cuban-American actor and director

== Sports ==
- Antonio Díaz (boxer), full name José Antonio Díaz (born 1976), Mexican world champion boxer
- Antonio Romero (canoeist), full name José Antonio Romero (born 1968), Mexican sprint canoer
- José Antonio Agudelo Gómez (born 1959), Colombian road racing cyclist
- José Antonio Aguirre (boxer) (born 1975), Mexican world champion boxer
- José António Bargiela (1957–2005), Portuguese footballer
- José Antonio Camacho (born 1955), Spanish footballer and football manager
- José Antonio Carrasco (born 1980), Spanish road racing cyclist
- José Antonio Caro (footballer, born 1993), Spanish footballer
- José Antonio Caro (footballer, born 1994), Spanish footballer
- José Antonio Casanova (1918–1999), Venezuelan baseball player and manager
- José Antonio Casilla (born 1979), Spanish Olympic volleyball player
- José Antonio Castillo (born 1970), Spanish footballer
- José Antonio Castro (born 1980), Mexican footballer, football manager
- José Antonio Cecchini (born 1955), Spanish Olympic wrestler
- José Antonio Colado (born 1976), Spanish sport shooter
- José Antonio Colon (born 1948), Puerto Rican boxer
- José Antonio Crespo (born 1977), Spanish badminton player
- José Antonio Culebras (born 1979), Spanish footballer
- José Antonio de Segovia (born 1982), Spanish road racing cyclist
- José Antonio Díez (born 1982), Spanish cyclo-cross cyclist
- José Antonio Delgado (1965–2006), Venezuelan mountaineer
- José Antonio Díaz (fencer) (born 1938), Cuban fencer
- José Antonio Duran (born 1946), Mexican Olympic boxer
- José Antonio Escuredo (born 1970), Spanish Olympic track racing cyclist
- José Antonio Espín (born 1985), Spanish footballer
- José Antonio Franco (footballer, born 1979), Paraguayan footballer
- José Antonio García Fernández (born 1992), Mexican footballer
- José Antonio Garcia Mena (born 1980), Spanish dressage rider
- José Antonio Gordillo (born 1974), Spanish footballer and football manager
- José António Gregório (born 1939), Portuguese Olympic wrestler
- José Antonio Hermida (born 1978), Spanish cross-country cyclist
- José Antonio Hernando (born 1963), Spanish Olympic boxer
- José Antonio Iglesias (born 1965), Spanish Olympic field hockey player
- José António Inácio (born 1967), Angolan Olympic judoka
- José Antonio Irulegui (born 1937), Spanish footballer and football manager
- José Antonio Latorre (born 1941), Spanish footballer
- José Antonio Llamas (born 1985), Spanish footballer
- José Antonio López (born 1976), Spanish road racing cyclist
- José Antonio Martiarena (born 1968), Spanish Olympic track racing cyclist
- José Antonio Martínez Gil (born 1993), Spanish footballer
- José Antonio Merín (born 1970), Spanish Olympic rower
- José Antonio Michelena (born 1988), Argentine footballer
- José Antonio Momeñe (1940–2010), Spanish road racing cyclist
- José Antonio Montero (born 1967), Spanish basketball player
- José Antonio Nogueira (born 1965), Brazilian football manager
- José Antonio Patlán (born 1983), Mexican footballer
- José Antonio Pavón Jiménez (1754–1840), Spanish botanist
- José Antonio Pecharromán (born 1978), Spanish road racing cyclist
- José Antonio Peral (born 1992), Spanish footballer
- José Antonio Picón (born 1988), Spanish footballer
- José Antonio Pikabea (born 1970), Spanish footballer
- José Antonio Querejeta (born 1957), Spanish basketball player turned executive
- José Antonio Redolat (born 1976), Spanish middle-distance runner
- José Antonio Redondo (born 1985), Spanish road racing cyclist
- José Antonio Reyes (1983–2019), Spanish footballer
- José Antonio Ríos (born 1990), Spanish footballer
- José Antonio Rivera (born 1973), American world champion boxer
- José Antonio Roca (1928–2007), Mexican footballer, football manager
- José Antonio Salguero (born 1960), Spanish footballer
- José Antonio Santamaría (1946–1993), Spanish footballer
- José Antonio Santana (born 1981), Spanish footballer
- José Antonio Saro (born 1938), Spanish footballer
- José Antonio Serrano Ramos (born 1984), Spanish footballer
- José Antonio Solano (born 1985), Spanish footballer
- José Antonio Tébez (1949–2018), Argentine footballer
- José Antonio Urquijo (born 1960), Chilean track racing cyclist
- José Antonio Villanueva (born 1979), Spanish track racing cyclist
- José Antonio Zaldúa (1941–2018), Spanish footballer
- José Bautista, full name José Antonio Bautista Santos (born 1980), Dominican MLB baseball player
- José Chamot, full name José Antonio Chamot (born 1969), Argentine footballer and football manager
- José Iglesias, full name José Antonio Iglesias Alemán (born 1990), Cuban-American MLB baseball player
- José Madueña, full name José Antonio Madueña Lopez (born 1990), Mexican footballer
- José Rijo, full name José Antonio Rijo Abreu (born 1965), Dominican MLB baseball player
- José-Antonio Chalbaud (born 1931), Venezuelan Olympic sports shooter
- Nono (Spanish footballer), full name José Antonio Delgado Villar (born 1993), Spanish footballer

== Government, religious, revolutionary and military leaders ==
- José Antonio Aguiriano (1932–1996), Spanish socialist politician
- José Antonio Aguirre (politician) (1904–1960), Spanish footballer and Basque politician
- José Antonio de Alzate y Ramírez (1737–1799), Spanish priest, scientist, historian and cartographer
- José Antonio Alonso (1960–2017), Spanish politician and judge
- José Antonio Álvarez Lima (born 1942), Mexican politician and senator
- José Antonio Álvarez Sánchez (1975–2025), Spanish Roman Catholic bishop
- José Antonio Anzoátegui (1789–1819), Venezuelan military leader in War of Independence from Spain
- José Antonio Aponte (c. 1760–1812), Cuban activist, military officer and leader of slave revolt
- José Antonio Aysa (born 1943), Mexican politician
- José Antonio Cabello (born 1964), Mexican politician
- José Antonio Cabrera (1768–1820), Argentine statesman
- José Antonio Carrillo (1796–1862), Californio rancher, officer, and politician
- José Antonio Chang (born 1958), Chinese-Peruvian Prime Minister of Peru
- José Antonio Dias Toffoli (born 1967), Brazilian President of the Supreme Federal Court of Brazil
- José Antonio Díaz García (born 1964), Mexican politician
- José Antonio Durán (1810–c. 1880), Argentine soldier and politician
- José Antonio Echeverría (1932–1957), Cuban revolutionary and student leader
- José Antonio Eguren (born 1956), Peruvian Roman Catholic Church archbishop
- José Antonio Fortea (born 1968), Spanish Roman Catholic priest, exorcist and writer
- José Antonio Gandarillas (1839–1913), Chilean politician
- José Antonio García Belaúnde (born 1948), Peruvian diplomat
- José Antonio Girón (1911–1995), Spanish politician
- José Antonio Gómez Urrutia (born 1953), Chilean politician
- José Antonio Griñán (born 1946), Spanish politician
- José Antonio Gutiérrez (1980–2003), Guatemalan, first US Marine killed in Iraq War
- José Antonio Haghenbeck (born 1955), Mexican politician and surgeon
- José Antonio Kast (born 1966), Chilean politician
- José Antonio Labordeta (1935–2010), Spanish singer-songwriter, journalist, politician
- José Antonio Lacayo de Briones y Palacios (1679–1756), Spanish colonial governor
- José Antonio León Mendivil (born 1946), Mexican politician
- José Antonio Llama (born 1941), Cuban-American anti-Castro conspirator
- José Antonio Maceo Grajales (1845–1896), Cuban military leader
- José Antonio Meade (born 1969), Mexican politician and diplomat
- José Antonio Medeiros (born 1970), Brazilian politician
- José Antonio Mexía (c. 1800–1839), Mexican politician and rebel general
- José Antonio Mijares (1819–1847), Mexican soldier
- José Antonio Mora (1897–1975), Uruguayan politician and diplomat
- José Antonio Muñiz (1919–1960), Puerto Rican national guard commander
- José Antonio Navarro (1795–1871), Texas statesman and revolutionary
- José Antonio Ocampo (born 1952), Colombian economist, professor and statesman in international development
- José Antonio Ortega Lara (born 1958), Spanish kidnap victim turned politician
- José Antonio Páez (1790–1873), Venezuelan military leader and politician
- José Antonio Pérez Sánchez (1947–2020), Mexican Roman Catholic bishop
- José Antônio Peruzzo (born 1960), Brazilian Roman Catholic archbishop
- José Antonio Price (1890–1951), Panamanian politician and physician
- José Antonio Primo de Rivera (born 1903), Spanish lawyer and fascist politician, founder and leader of the Falange Española
- José Antonio Pujante (1964–2019), Spanish politician and philosophy professor
- José Antonio Remón Cantera (1908–1955), President of Panama
- José Antonio Reynafé (1796–1837), Argentine military leader and politician
- José Antonio Roméu (c. 1742–1792), Spanish colonial governor
- José Antonio Romualdo Pacheco (1831–1899), American politician and diplomat
- José Antonio Saco (1797–1879), Cuban statesman, politician, writer, anthropologist and historian
- José Antonio Salcedo (1816–1864), Dominican revolutionary leader and Head of State
- José Antônio Saraiva (1823–1895), Brazilian politician and diplomat
- José Antonio Saravia (1785–1871), Spanish-Russian army officer
- José Antonio Souto (1938–2017), Spanish jurist and politician
- José Antonio Velutini Ron (1844–1912), Venezuelan military leader, politician and statesman
- José Antonio Vivó Undabarrena (1930–1979), Spanish politician
- José Antonio Yorba (1743–1825), Spanish soldier and landowner in Spanish California
- Josu Urrutikoetxea, full name José Antonio Urrutikoetxea Bengoetxea (born 1950), Spanish separatist leader
- Simón Bolívar, full name José Antonio de la Santísima Trinidad Bolívar... (1783–1830), liberator of South America

== Business, science and technology ==
- José Antonio Álvarez Álvarez (born 1960), Spanish corporate executive
- José Antonio Attolini Lack (1931–2012), Mexican architect
- José Antonio Fernández Carbajal (born 1954), Mexican corporate executive
- Jose Antonio Ortega Bonet (1929–2009), Cuban-American entrepreneur and businessman
- José Antonio Sosa (born 1957), Spanish architect and researcher, member of the Royal Spanish Academy

== Other ==
- José Antonio Álvarez (disambiguation)
- José Antonio González (disambiguation)
- José Antonio Rodríguez (disambiguation)
- José Antonio Aguirre (early Californian) (1799–1860), Spanish settler in Alta California
- José Antonio Estudillo (1803–1852), Californio settler of San Diego, California
- José Antonio Fernández de Castro (1887–1951), Cuban journalist and writer
- José Antonio Gil Yepes, Venezuelan sociologist
- José Antonio Gurriarán (1938–2019), Spanish journalist
- Jose Antonio Vargas (born 1981), Filipino-American journalist, filmmaker, and immigration rights activist

== See also ==
- José (disambiguation)
- Antonio (disambiguation)
- Antonio José (disambiguation)
