= Álvarez (surname) =

- Language: Ancient Germanic, Gothic, Spanish

Origin
- Meaning: Son of Álvaro
- Region of origin: Spain

Other names
- Related names: Álvaro; Alf; Alfred

Álvarez (sometimes Alvarez) is a Spanish surname of Germanic origin, a patronymic meaning "son of Álvaro". Its Portuguese equivalent is Álvares. Notable people with the surname include:

== Actors, singers, musicians ==
- Ana Álvarez (born 1969), Spanish model and actress
- Andreína Álvarez (born 1979), Venezuelan actor
- Angela Alvarez (1927–2024), Cuban-born American singer
- Carlos Álvarez (baritone) (born 1966), Spanish opera singer
- Cristian Álvarez (musician) (born 1972), Argentine musician
- David Alvarez (born 1994), Canadian dancer and actor
- Enrique Álvarez Félix (1934–1996), Mexican actor
- Francisco Álvarez (actor) (1892–1960), Argentine actor
- George Alvarez, Cuban/American actor
- Germán Álvarez Beigbeder (1882–1968), Spanish composer
- Ian Antonio Alvarez, also known as Bunji Garlin (born 1978), Trinidadian male soca singer
- Izabella Alvarez (born 2004), American actress
- Javier Álvarez (1956–2023), Mexican composer
- Julión Álvarez (born 1983), Mexican musician
- Karl Alvarez (born 1964), American musician
- Miguel Álvarez-Fernández (born 1979), Spanish composer
- Roy Alvarez (1950–2014), Filipino actor, director and screenwriter
- Zayra Alvarez, Puerto Rican musician

== Military figures ==
- Ochoa de Alvarez de Isásaga (1470–1555), Spanish nobleman, Chief of the Supreme Council of the Indies, Order of Santiago
- Casta Álvarez (1776–1846), Spanish soldier
- Everett Alvarez Jr. (born 1937), American naval officer and prisoner of war
- Mariano Álvarez de Castro (1749–1810), Spanish brigadier
- Mariano Álvarez (1749–1810), Filipino general, statesman, and teacher
- Vicente Álvarez (general) (1862–1942), Filipino revolutionary

== Painters, sculptors ==
- Ana Albertina Delgado Álvarez (born 1963), Cuban artist
- Celia Álvarez Muñoz (born 1937), American artist
- José Álvarez Cubero (1768–1827), Spanish sculptor in the neoclassical style
- Mabel Alvarez (1891–1985), American oil painter, daughter of Luis F. Álvarez
- Negra Álvarez (born 1948), Salvadoran visual artist
- Pedro Álvarez Castelló (1967–2004), Cuban painter

== Politicians ==
- Amy Alvarez, Filipino politician
- Carlos Álvarez (American politician) (born c. 1952), Cuban-American politician from Florida
- Eugenio Alvarez (1918–1976), New York assemblyman
- Gregorio Conrado Álvarez (1925–2016), Uruguayan general and dictator
- José Manuel Álvarez, Argentine politician
- Juan Álvarez (1790–1867), Mexican general and president
- Julián Álvarez (lawyer) (1788–1843), Argentine politician
- Maira Mariela Macdonal Alvarez, Bolivian diplomat
- María Carmen Castilla Álvarez (born 1968), Spanish politician
- Osvaldo Álvarez Guerrero (1940–2008), Argentine politician
- Pedro Álvarez de Toledo, 1st Marquis of Mancera (c. 1585–1654), Spanish viceroy of Peru
- Pedro Álvarez de Toledo, Marquis of Villafranca (1484–1553), Spanish viceroy of the Kingdom of Naples
- Pilar Caballero Alvarez (born 1993), German politician
- Vicente Álvarez Travieso (1705–1779), Spanish judge and politician

== Sports figures ==
=== Baseball ===
- Abe Alvarez (born 1982), American baseball player
- Andrew Alvarez (born 1999), American baseball player
- Armando Alvarez (baseball) (born 1994), American baseball player
- Clemente Álvarez (born 1968), Venezuelan baseball player
- Eddy Alvarez (born 1990), American baseball player
- Francisco Álvarez (baseball) (born 2001), Venezuelan baseball player
- Hayden Alvarez (born 2007), Dominican baseball player
- Henderson Álvarez (born 1990), Venezuelan baseball player
- Jose Alvarez (baseball, born 1956), American baseball player
- José Álvarez (baseball, born 1989), Venezuelan baseball player
- Juan Alvarez (born 1973), American baseball player
- Nacho Alvarez Jr. (born 2003), American baseball player
- Pedro Alvarez (baseball) (born 1987), Dominican baseball player
- Rafael Álvarez (baseball) (born 1977), Venezuelan baseball player
- R. J. Alvarez (born 1991), American baseball player
- Tony Álvarez (born 1979), Venezuelan baseball player
- Veronica Alvarez (born 1983), American baseball catcher
- Wilson Álvarez (born 1970), Venezuelan baseball player
- Yadier Álvarez (born 1996), Cuban baseball pitcher
- Yordan Alvarez (born 1997), Cuban-born baseball player

=== Basketball ===
- Lester Alvarez (born 1988), Filipino basketball player
- Miguel Álvarez Pozo (1949–2016), Cuban basketball player
- Paul Alvarez (born 1968), Filipino basketball player
- Rich Alvarez (born 1980), Filipino basketball player

=== Football (soccer) ===
- Arturo Alvarez (born 1985), American footballer
- Carlos Alvarez (born 1990), American soccer player
- Cristian Darío Álvarez (born 1985), Argentine footballer
- Cristian Osvaldo Álvarez (born 1978), Argentine footballer
- Damián Ariel Álvarez (born 1979), Argentine footballer
- David Álvarez Aguirre, see Kily Álvarez
- Edson Álvarez (born 1997), Mexican footballer
- Julián Álvarez (born 2000), Argentine footballer
- Kevin Álvarez (footballer, born 1996), Honduran footballer
- Kevin Álvarez (footballer, born 1999), Mexican footballer
- Kily Álvarez (born 1984), Equatoguinean footballer
- Leonel Álvarez (born 1965), Colombian footballer
- Leonel Álvarez (born 1995), Argentine footballer
- Leonel Álvarez (born 1996), Argentine footballer
- Lorgio Álvarez (born 1978), Bolivian footballer
- Luciano Álvarez (born 1978), Argentine footballer
- Óscar Marcelino Álvarez (1948–2018), Argentine football player
- Pablo Sebastián Álvarez (born 1984), Argentine footballer
- Quique Álvarez (born 1975), Spanish footballer
- Ricardo Gabriel Álvarez (born 1988), Argentine footballer

=== Other sports ===
- Almudena Álvarez (born 1982), Spanish boxer
- Barry Alvarez (born 1946), American football coach and sports administrator
- Bernard Alvarez (born 1939), American NASCAR Cup Series driver
- Bryan Alvarez (born 1975), American wrestler and journalist
- Canelo Álvarez (Santos Saúl Álvarez Barragán; born 1990), Mexican boxer
- Eddie Alvarez (born 1984), American mixed martial artist
- Francisco Álvarez (born 1969), Cuban beach volleyball player
- José Álvarez de Bohórquez, Spanish equestrian
- José Luis Álvarez (born 1969), Spanish fencer
- José Marcelo Álvarez (born 1975), Paraguayan fencer
- Lynn Alvarez (born 1985), American mixed martial artist
- María Fernanda Álvarez Terán (born 1989), Bolivian tennis player
- Nancy Alvarez (born 1976), Argentine Olympic athlete
- Oscar Álvarez (born 1977), Colombian road cyclist
- Rafael Álvarez (diver) (born 1971), Spanish diver
- Rimas Álvarez Kairelis (born 1974), Argentine rugby player
- Robin Álvarez (born 1987), Swedish ice hockey player
- Tania Alvarez (born 2002), Spanish boxer
- Tania Álvarez (born 1994), Spanish marathon canoeist
- Wilson Alvarez (born 1957), Bolivian player of American football

== Writers, novelists, poets ==
- Al Alvarez (1929–2019), English writer
- Emilio Álvarez Lejarza (1884–1969), Nicaraguan jurist and political writer
- Emilio Álvarez Montalván (1919–2014), Nicaraguan ophthalmologist and political writer
- José María Álvarez de Sotomayor, Spanish playwright and poet
- José Sixto Álvarez, aka Fray Mocho, Argentine writer
- Julia Alvarez (born 1950), American writer
- Severiano Álvarez (1933–2013), Spanish writer

== Others ==
- Ada Álvarez, Cuban-Mexican operations researcher
- Onion News Network's Brooke Alvarez, played by Suzanne Sena
- Ciriaco Álvarez (1873-?), Chilean Chiloé businessman
- Fede Álvarez (born 1978), Uruguayan filmmaker
- Felix Alvarez (born 1951), Gibraltar human and civil rights activist and defender
- Gabriela Álvarez (engineer) (died 2017), Mexican mechanical engineer
- Gregorio Álvarez (historian) (1889–1986), Argentine physician and historian
- Ignacio Álvarez Aguerre (born 1971), Uruguayan journalist and television presenter
- José Álvarez de Toledo, Duke of Alba (1756–1796), Spanish patron of painter Goya
- José Antonio Álvarez Sánchez (1975–2025), Spanish Roman Catholic bishop
- Juan Álvarez (historian) (1878–1954), Argentine judge and historian
- Juan Manuel Alvarez, man convicted of causing the 2005 Glendale train crash
- Luis F. Álvarez (1853–1937), American physician, father of Mabel Alvarez and Walter C. Alvarez
- Luis Walter Alvarez (1911–1988), American physicist, and recipient of the Nobel Prize in Physics, son of Walter C. Alvarez, father of Walter Alvarez
- Mayra Álvarez, Mexican nanoscientist
- Melania Alvarez, Mexican mathematics educator in Canada
- Nancy Alvarez (psychologist) (born 1950), Dominican psychologist and TV presenter
- Pedro J. J. Alvarez, professor of Civil and Environmental Engineering at Rice University
- Pero Alvarez, 15th-century freed Portuguese slave
- Robert Alvarez (born 1948), American animator, television director, and writer
- Rosendo Álvarez Gastón (1926–2014), Spanish Roman Catholic bishop
- Thalía Álvarez (1962–2011), Ecuadorian anthropologist and activist
- Vincent Alvares (1680–1738), Indian doctor and clergyman
- Virginia Pereira Álvarez (1888–1947) Venezuelan physician
- Walter Alvarez (born 1940), American geologist responsible for discovering the reasons behind Cretaceous–Tertiary extinction event, son of Luis Walter Alvarez
- Walter C. Alvarez (1884–1978), American physician, son of Luis F. Álvarez, father of Luis Walter Alvarez

== Fictional characters ==
- Dr Alvarez, criminal in James Bond
- Judy Alvarez, a braindance editor in Cyberpunk 2077
