= Jose Alvarez =

Jose Alvarez or José Álvarez may refer to:

== Academics ==
- José Álvarez Junco (born 1942), Spanish historian
- José Rogelio Álvarez (1922–2011), Mexican historian, writer and encyclopaedist

== Arts and Entertainment ==
- José Álvarez Cubero (1768–1827), Spanish sculptor in the neoclassical style
- José Álvarez de Toledo, Duke of Alba (1756–1796), patron of painter Goya
- Fray Mocho, pen name of José Ciriaco Alvarez (1858–1903), Argentine writer and journalist
- José María Álvarez de Sotomayor (1880–1947), Spanish playwright and poet
- José Luis Álvarez (artist) (1917–2012), Guatemalan artist
- José María Álvarez (born 1942), Spanish poet and novelist

== Business ==
- José Antonio Álvarez Condarco (1780–1855), Argentine soldier, cartographer and manufacturer of explosives
- José Antonio Álvarez (born 1960), Spanish banker
- José María Álvarez-Pallete (born 1963), Spanish economist and CEO

== Politics ==
=== Mexico ===
- José Antonio Álvarez Lima (born 1942), Mexican politician
- José Irene Álvarez Ramos (born 1955), Mexican politician
- José Luis Álvarez Martínez (born 1968), Mexican politician

=== Spain ===
- José Álvarez de Toledo y Dubois (1779–1858), Spanish politician and military leader in Texas
- José Joaquín Álvarez de Toledo, 18th Duke of Medina Sidonia (1826–1900), Spanish aristocrat and politician
- José Álvarez de Toledo y Acuña (1838–1898), Spanish politician and diplomant
- José Joaquín Álvarez de Toledo, 19th Duke of Medina Sidonia (1865–1915), Spanish Duke
- Joaquín Álvarez de Toledo, 20th Duke of Medina Sidonia (1894–1955), Spanish Duke
- José Luis Álvarez de Castro (1918–2021), Spanish politician
- José Luis Álvarez (politician) (1930–2023), Spanish politician
- José Álvarez de Paz (1935–2021), Spanish politician
- José María Álvarez del Manzano (born 1937), Spanish politician

=== Elsewhere ===
- José Francisco Álvarez (1796–1841), Argentine lawyer and politician, Governor of Córdoba
- José Manuel Álvarez (fl. 1901–1904), Argentine politician, Governor of Córdoba
- Jose Alvarez (Filipino politician) (born 1944), Filipino politician

== Religion ==
- José Antonio Álvarez Sánchez (1975–2025), Spanish Roman Catholic bishop

== Sports ==
=== Association football ===
- José Álvarez (footballer) (born 1945), Mexican footballer
- José Daniel Álvarez (born 1975), Argentine football midfielder

=== Baseball ===
- Joe Alvarez, full name José René Álvarez Ramírez (born 1956), Cuban American baseball manager
- Jose Alvarez (baseball, born 1956), American former Major League Baseball pitcher who played for the Atlanta Braves from 1981 to 1989
- José Álvarez (baseball, born 1989), Venezuelan Major League Baseball pitcher for the San Francisco Giants

=== Fencing ===
- José Luis Álvarez (fencer) (born 1969), Spanish fencer
- José Marcelo Álvarez (born 1975), Paraguayan fencer

=== Sports shooting ===
- José Álvarez (Virgin Islands sport shooter) (1926–2021), sports shooter from the United States Virgin Islands
- José Álvarez (Mexican sport shooter) (born 1947), sports shooter from Mexico

=== Other sports ===
- José Álvarez de Bohórquez (1895–1993), Spanish equestrian, Summer Olympics competitor
- José Luis Alvarez del Monte (1931–?), Uruguayan chess player
- José Luis Álvarez (rower) (born 1943), Mexican rower
- José de Jesús Álvarez Gutiérrez (born 1978), a Mexican professional wrestler who wrestles under the ring name Joe Líder
