= José Antonio Álvarez =

José Antonio Álvarez may refer to:

- José Antonio Álvarez Álvarez (born 1960), Spanish banker, CEO of Santander Group
- José Antonio Álvarez Baena (1754–1799), Spanish chronicler and historian, researched the hermit Gregorio López
- José Antonio Álvarez Condarco (1780–1855), Argentine soldier, manufacturer of explosives and cartographer
- José Antonio Álvarez Lima (born 1942), Mexican politician, diplomat and broadcasting executive
- José Antonio Álvarez Sánchez (1975–2025), Spanish prelate of the Roman Catholic Church

== See also ==
- Jose Alvarez (disambiguation)
