= Pedro Alvarez =

Pedro Alvarez may refer to:

- Pedro Álvarez de Toledo, Marquis of Villafranca (1484–1553), Spanish viceroy of Naples
- Pedro Alvarez de Acosta (1484–1563), Catholic Bishop of Osma
- Pedro Álvares Cabral (c. 1468–1520), Portuguese navigator
- Pedro Álvarez Holguín (1490–1542), Spanish conquistador in Peru
- Pedro de Toledo, 1st Marquis of Mancera (1585–1654), Spanish general and viceroy of Peru
- Pedro Álvarez Suárez (1893–1986), Chilean politician
- Pedro Álvarez Castelló (1967–2004), Cuban painter
- Pedro Álvarez (baseball) (born 1987), Dominican professional baseball player
- Pedro Álvarez (footballer) (born 1970), Colombian association football player
- Pedro J. J. Alvarez, Nicaraguan engineer
- Pedro Mario Álvarez (born 1982), Spanish footballer

== See also ==
- Pedro Álvarez-Salamanca (disambiguation)
