= Cotrina =

Cotrina is a Spanish surname. Notable people with the surname include:

- Álvaro Sánchez Cotrina (born 1986), Spanish politician
- José Antonio Cotrina (born 1972), Spanish author
