= Gabriela Álvarez =

Gabriela Álvarez may refer to:

- Gabriela Álvarez (engineer)
- Gabriela Álvarez (footballer)
