= Juan Alcacer =

United States economist

Academic background
- Education: Ross School of Business (PhD), University of Michigan (MA in economics), IESA (MBA), Universidad Simon Bolivar

Juan Alcacer is a United States economist, currently the James J. Hill Professor of Business Administration at Harvard Business School.

== Research ==
Alcacer’s research examines growth and exit strategies, as well as how firms respond to major environmental changes such as Brexit, with an emphasis on strategic decisionmaking under geopolitical and technological uncertainty. He has also analyzed location strategies, outsourcing, and global value chain management across countries. In addition, he has investigated cluster‑based innovation and global intellectual property systems, particularly patent regimes across nations.
