= Undabarrena =

Undabarrena is a surname. Notable people with the surname include:

- Eneko Undabarrena (born 1993), Spanish footballer
- Iker Undabarrena (born 1995), Spanish footballer
- José Antonio Vivó Undabarrena (1930–1979), Spanish politician
