= Francisco Montero =

Francisco Montero may refer to:

- Francisco Montero (footballer, born 1952), Peruvian footballer
- Francisco Montero (footballer, born 1999), or Javi Montero, Spanish footballer
- Francisco Arano Montero (born 1950), Mexican politician

== See also ==
- Francisco Monteiro (1926–2002), Hong Kong swimmer
- Francisco da Costa Monteiro, East Timorese oil expert and politician
