= Gabriel de Jesús Cárdenas =

Mexican politician

- Born: 27 June 1987 (age 38); Tierra Blanca, Veracruz, Mexico
- Occupation: Deputy
- Political party: PAN

Gabriel de Jesús Cárdenas Guízar (born 28 June 1987) is a Mexican politician affiliated with the National Action Party (PAN). In the 2012 general election he was elected to the Chamber of Deputies to represent Veracruz's 17th district during the 62nd Congress.
