= José Tomás Carrillo =

Mexican politician

- Born: 11 August 1968 (age 57); Cosamaloapan, Veracruz, Mexico
- Occupation: Politician
- Political party: PRI

José Tomás Carrillo Sánchez (born 11 August 1968) is a Mexican politician from the Institutional Revolutionary Party (PRI). In the 2009 mid-terms he was elected to the Chamber of Deputies to represent Veracruz's 17th district during the 61st Congress.

He stood down from his seat on 1 December 2010 and was replaced by his alternate, José Luis Álvarez Martínez.
