= CDA Navalcarnero =

Spanish football club

Coordinates: 40.2843°N 4.0177°W

Navalcarnero
- Full name: Club Deportivo Artístico Navalcarnero
- Nicknames: rojo and blanco (Red and Whites) ROJO (THE REDS) Chivas (THE GOATS)
- Founded: 1961; 65 years ago
- Ground: Mariano González, Navalcarnero, Madrid, Spain
- Capacity: 2,500
- President: Marcos Pelluz Romero
- Head coach: Larry Pérez
- League: Segunda Federación – Group 5
- 2025–26: Segunda Federación – Group 5, 10th of 18
Home colours	Away colours

Club Deportivo Artístico Navalcarnero is a football team based in Navalcarnero, in the autonomous community of Madrid, Spain. Founded in 1961, it plays in Segunda Federación – Group 5, holding home games at the 2,500-seat Estadio Mariano González.

== History ==
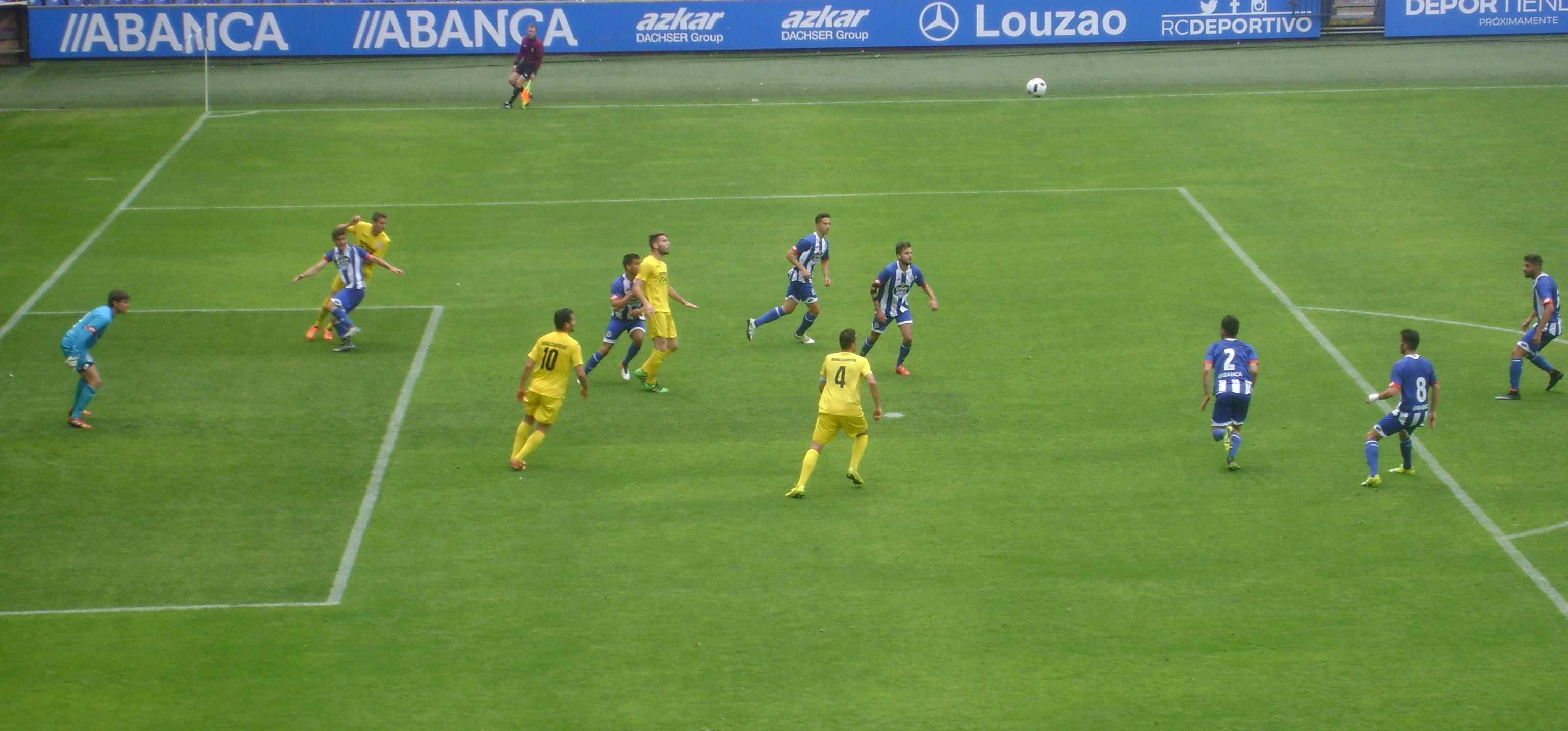
Deportivo de La Coruña B vs. Navalcarnero.

The team was founded in 1961 and registered in the Castilian Federation on 11 August that year to be able to play in lower categories of the Spanish football league system. In the 1987–88 season Navalcarnero debuted for the first time in the Tercera División.

On 6 January 2021 Navalcarnero recorded one of their most impressive results in recent history by beating UD Las Palmas 1–0 at home in the second round of the 2020–21 Copa del Rey. Eleven days later in the round of 32 the team earned their most impressive result to date by beating La Liga side SD Eibar 3–1 at home to progress to the round of 16 for the first time in their history.

== Season to season ==
Season	Tier	Division	Place	Copa del Rey
1961–62	6	3ª Reg.	5th	
1962–63	6	3ª Reg.	3rd	
1963–64	5	2ª Reg.	14th	
1964–65	5	2ª Reg.	17th	
1965–66	5	2ª Reg.	5th	
1966–67	5	2ª Reg.	6th	
1967–68	5	2ª Reg.	13th	
1968–69	5	2ª Reg.	7th	
1969–70	5	2ª Reg.	20th	
1970–71	7	3ª Reg.	14th	
1971–72	7	3ª Reg.	9th	
1972–73	7	3ª Reg.	9th	
1973–74	8	3ª Reg.	1st	
1974–75	7	3ª Reg. P.	2nd	
1975–76	6	2ª Reg.	9th	
1976–77	6	2ª Reg.	16th	
1977–78	7	2ª Reg.	4th	
1978–79	7	2ª Reg.	3rd	
1979–80	6	1ª Reg.	7th	
1980–81	6	1ª Reg.	13th	

Season	Tier	Division	Place	Copa del Rey
1981–82	6	1ª Reg.	14th	
1982–83	6	1ª Reg.	6th	
1983–84	6	1ª Reg.	3rd	
1984–85	6	1ª Reg.	3rd	
1985–86	5	Reg. Pref.	15th	
1986–87	5	Reg. Pref.	5th	
1987–88	4	3ª	12th	
1988–89	4	3ª	8th	
1989–90	4	3ª	10th	
1990–91	4	3ª	14th	
1991–92	4	3ª	18th	
1992–93	4	3ª	20th	
1993–94	5	Reg. Pref.	4th	
1994–95	5	Reg. Pref.	2nd	
1995–96	4	3ª	17th	
1996–97	5	Reg. Pref.	1st	
1997–98	4	3ª	16th	
1998–99	4	3ª	11th	
1999–2000	4	3ª	12th	
2000–01	4	3ª	14th	

Season	Tier	Division	Place	Copa del Rey
2001–02	4	3ª	3rd	
2002–03	4	3ª	2nd	
2003–04	4	3ª	4th	
2004–05	3	2ª B	19th	
2005–06	4	3ª	12th	
2006–07	4	3ª	7th	
2007–08	4	3ª	2nd	
2008–09	3	2ª B	17th	
2009–10	4	3ª	7th	
2010–11	4	3ª	16th	
2011–12	4	3ª	18th	
2012–13	5	Pref.	6th	
2013–14	5	Pref.	2nd	
2014–15	4	3ª	2nd	
2015–16	4	3ª	2nd	
2016–17	3	2ª B	15th	
2017–18	3	2ª B	6th	
2018–19	3	2ª B	19th	First round
2019–20	4	3ª	1st	
2020–21	3	2ª B	6th / 5th	Round of 16

Season	Tier	Division	Place	Copa del Rey
2021–22	4	2ª RFEF	3rd	
2022–23	4	2ª Fed.	3rd	First round
2023–24	4	2ª Fed.	8th	First round
2024–25	4	2ª Fed.	6th	
2025–26	4	2ª Fed.	10th	Second round
2026–27	4	2ª Fed.		

- 6 seasons in Segunda División B
- 6 seasons in Segunda Federación/Segunda División RFEF
- 23 seasons in Tercera División

== Players ==
=== Current squad ===
As of 1 March 2025

Note: Flags indicate national team as defined under FIFA eligibility rules; some limited exceptions apply. Players may hold more than one non-FIFA nationality.

No.	Pos.	Nation	Player
1	GK	ESP	Álvaro Calado
3	DF	ESP	Juanmi Heredero
4	DF	ESP	Miguel García
5	DF	ESP	Axel Espínola
6	DF	ESP	Richi de Souza
7	FW	ESP	Rober Álvarez
8	MF	ESP	Iván Quivira
9	FW	ESP	Jaime Pérez
10	MF	ESP	Peque
11	FW	ESP	Mario Jiménez
12	DF	MAR	Walid Chahid

No.	Pos.	Nation	Player
13	GK	ESP	Dani Simón
14	MF	ESP	Javi Bueno
15	MF	ESP	Jesús Cruz
17	MF	ESP	Darío García
19	DF	ESP	Angelito Auñón
21	FW	ESP	Álex Maroto
22	FW	ESP	Chus Villar
23	DF	POR	João Dias
24	FW	ESP	Álex Altube
29	DF	ESP	Daniel Montoya
30	FW	ESP	Marcos Moraga

== Uniform ==
Old shield

- Sponsor: Navalcarnero City Hall
- Sports equipment: Joma

== Former players ==
- (Spain) (Dominican Republic) José Freijo
- (Spain) José Antonio
