= Osiel Castro de la Rosa =

Mexican politician

- Born: 11 April 1966 (age 60); Veracruz, Mexico
- Occupation: Politician
- Political party: PAN

Osiel Castro de la Rosa (born 11 April 1966) is a Mexican politician from the National Action Party (PAN). In the 2006 general election he was elected to the Chamber of Deputies to represent Veracruz's 17th district during the 60th Congress.
