= 17th federal electoral district of Veracruz =

Federal electoral district of Mexico

Veracruz's 17th
- Electoral district of the Chamber of Deputies of Mexico

- 17th district since 2023

Incumbent
- Member: Margarita Corro Mendoza
- Party: ▌Morena
- Congress: 66th (2024–2027)

District
- State: Veracruz
- Head town: Cosamaloapan
- Coordinates: 18°22′N 95°48′W
- Covers: 18 municipalities: Acula, Alvarado, Amatitlán, Carlos A. Carrillo, Chacaltianguis, Cosamaloapan, Ignacio de la Llave, Ixmatlahuacan, José Azueta, Lerdo de Tejada, Otatitlán, Saltabarranca, Tierra Blanca, Tlacojalpan, Tlacotalpan, Tlalixcoyan, Tres Valles, Tuxtilla
- PR region: Third
- Precincts: 342
- Population: 433,401 (2020 census)

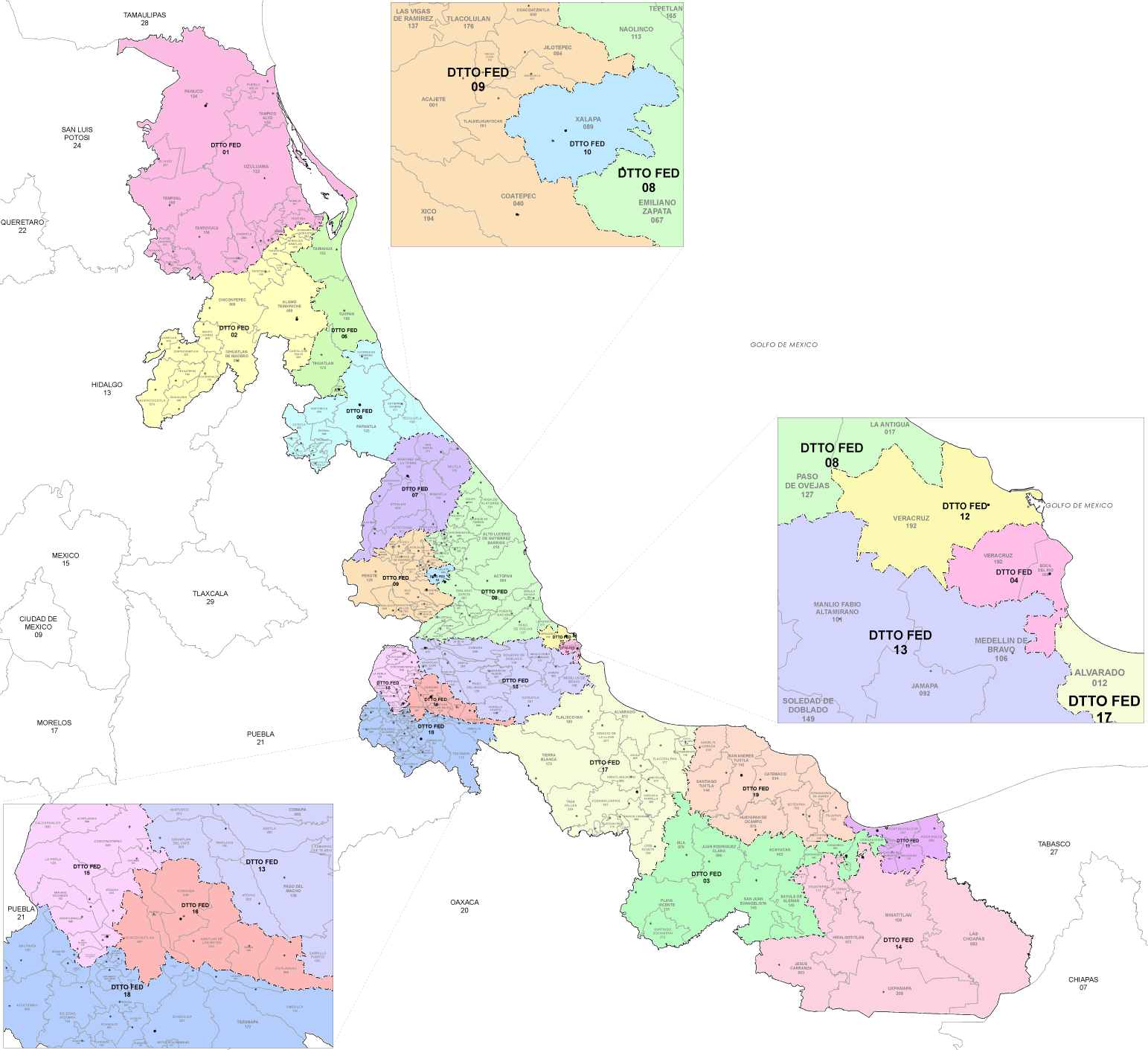
Veracruz's 2023 districts

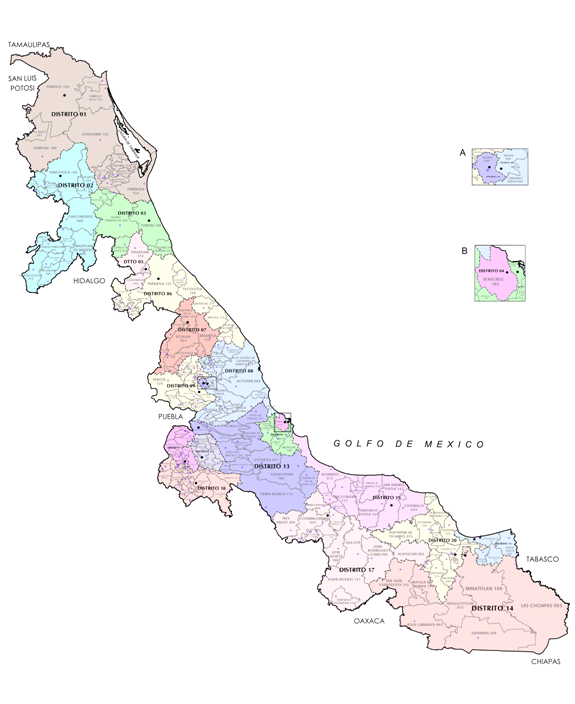
Veracruz under the 2017–2022 districting plan

The 17th federal electoral district of Veracruz (Spanish: Distrito electoral federal 17 de Veracruz) is one of the 300 electoral districts into which Mexico is divided for elections to the federal Chamber of Deputies and one of 19 such districts in the state of Veracruz.

It elects one deputy to the lower house of Congress for each three-year legislative session by means of the first-past-the-post system. Votes cast in the district also count towards the calculation of proportional representation ("plurinominal") deputies elected from the third region.

The 17th district was re-established in 1978 and was subsequently contested in the 1979 mid-term election.

The current member for the district, elected in the 2024 general election, is Margarita Corro Mendoza of the National Regeneration Movement (Morena).

== District territory ==
Veracruz lost a congressional district in the 2023 districting plan adopted by the National Electoral Institute (INE), which is to be used for the 2024, 2027 and 2030 elections. The reconfigured 17th district covers 342 electoral precincts (secciones electorales) across 18 municipalities in the state's Papaloapan region:

- Acula, Alvarado, Amatitlán, Carlos A. Carrillo, Chacaltianguis, Cosamaloapan, Ignacio de la Llave, Ixmatlahuacan, José Azueta, Lerdo de Tejada, Otatitlán, Saltabarranca, Tierra Blanca, Tlacojalpan, Tlacotalpan, Tlalixcoyan, Tres Valles and Tuxtilla.

The head town (cabecera distrital), where results from individual polling stations are gathered together and tallied, is the city of Cosamaloapan. The district reported a population of 433,401 in the 2020 census.

== Previous districting schemes ==
Evolution of electoral district numbers
	1974	1978	1996	2005	2017	2023
Veracruz	15	23	23	21	20	19
Chamber of Deputies	196	300				

Because of shifting demographics, Veracruz currently has four fewer districts than the 23 the state was allocated under the 1977 electoral reforms.

2017–2022

Between 2017 and 2022, Veracruz was assigned 20 electoral districts. The 17th district comprised 14 municipalities, with some overlap with the 2023 scheme:
- Acayucan, Cosamaloapan, Chacaltianguis, Isla, Ixmatlahuacan, Juan Rodríguez Clara, Otatitlán, Playa Vicente, José Azueta, Tlacojalpan, Tuxtilla, Tres Valles, Carlos A. Carrillo and Santiago Sochiapan.
Its head town was the city of Cosamaloapan.

2005–2017

Veracruz's allocation of congressional seats fell to 21 in the 2005 redistricting process. Between 2005 and 2017 the 17th district had its head town at Cosamaloapan and it comprised 12 municipalities:
- Alvarado, Cosamaloapan, Cotaxtla, Ignacio de la Llave, Ixmatlahuacan, Jamapa, Medellín, Otatitlán, Tierra Blanca, Tlacojalpan, Tlalixcoyan and Tres Valles.

1996–2005

Under the 1996 districting plan, which assigned Veracruz 23 districts, the head town was moved to Cosamaloapan and the district covered 11 municipalities.

1978–1996

The districting scheme in force from 1978 to 1996 was the result of the 1977 electoral reforms, which increased the number of single-member seats in the Chamber of Deputies from 196 to 300. Under that plan, Veracruz's seat allocation rose from 15 to 23. The newly created 17th district had its head town at Chicontepec in the state's northern Huasteca Baja region and it covered the municipalities of Benito Juárez, Chicontepec, Huayacocotla, Ilamatlán, Ixhuatlán de Madero, Texcatepec, Tlachichilco, Zacualpan and Zontecomatlán.

== Deputies returned to Congress ==
(Mexico) National parties
- Current
- PAN
- PRI
- PT
- PVEM
- MC
- Morena
- PAZ
- Somos
- Defunct or local only
- PLM
- PNR
- PRM
- PNM
- PP
- PPS
- PARM
- PFCRN
- CON
- PANAL
- PSD
- PES
- PES
- PRD

Veracruz's 17th district
Election	Deputy	Party	Term	Legislature
1916	Galdino H. Casados		1916–1917	Constituent Congress of Querétaro
...
1979	Manuel Ramos Gurrión (Note: The election of 1 July 1979 in the 17th district was annulled. A special election was held on 2 December, which was won by Ramos Gurrión.)	Institutional Revolutionary Party	1979–1982	51st Congress
1982	Elpidia Excelente Azuara	Institutional Revolutionary Party	1982–1985	52nd Congress
1985	Héctor Aguirre Barragán	Institutional Revolutionary Party	1985–1988	53rd Congress
1988	Antonio Cruz Sánchez	Institutional Revolutionary Party	1988–1991	54th Congress
1991	Rufino Saucedo Márquez	Institutional Revolutionary Party	1991–1994	55th Congress
1994	Alicia González Cerecedo	Institutional Revolutionary Party	1994–1997	56th Congress
1997	Francisco Javier Loyo Ramos	Institutional Revolutionary Party	1997–2000	57th Congress
2000	Francisco Arano Montero	National Action Party (Mexico)	2000–2003	58th Congress
2003	Diego Palmero Andrade	National Action Party (Mexico)	2003–2006	59th Congress
2006	Osiel Castro de la Rosa	National Action Party (Mexico)	2006–2009	60th Congress
2009	José Tomás Carrillo Sánchez (Note: Carrillo Sánchez resigned his seat on 1 December 2010.); José Luis Álvarez Martínez	Institutional Revolutionary Party	2009–2010; 2010–2012	61st Congress
2012	Gabriel de Jesús Cárdenas Guízar	National Action Party (Mexico)	2012–2015	62nd Congress
2015	Tarek Abdalá Saad	Institutional Revolutionary Party	2015–2018	63rd Congress
2018	Valentín Reyes López	National Regeneration Movement	2018–2021	64th Congress
2021	Valentín Reyes López (Note: Reyes López died in office on 22 March 2024. He was replaced by his substitute, Ramírez Ortiz, for the remainder of his term.); Abel Ramírez Ortiz	National Regeneration Movement	2021–2024; 2024	65th Congress
2024	Margarita Corro Mendoza	National Regeneration Movement	2024–2027	66th Congress

== Presidential elections ==
Veracruz's 17th district
Election	District won by	Party or coalition	%
2018	Andrés Manuel López Obrador	Juntos Haremos Historia	54.1612
2024	Claudia Sheinbaum Pardo	Sigamos Haciendo Historia	69.2211
