= Reinickendorf 1 =

State electoral district of Germany

- Electoral district for the Berlin House of Representatives
- Reinickendorf 1 in 2026
- District: Reinickendorf
- Electorate: 28,098 (2026)

Current electoral district
- Party: The Left
- Member: Pilar Caballero Alvarez

Reinickendorf 1 is an electoral constituency (German: Wahlkreis) represented in the House of Representatives of Berlin. It elects one member via first-past-the-post voting.

== Geography ==
The constituency comprises Reinickendorf East and part of Reinickendorf West. It is entirely within the borough of Reinickendorf.

There were 28,098 eligible voters in 2026.

== Members ==
| Election | Member | Party | % |
|---|---|---|---|
| 1999 | Joachim Bohm | CDU | 54.9 |
| 2001 | Ulrich Brinsa | CDU | 39.8 |
| 2006 | Walter Momper | SPD | 37.1 |
| 2011 | Burkard Dregger | CDU | 34.0 |
| 2016 | Burkard Dregger | CDU | 26.6 |
| 2021 | Bettina König | SPD | 27.2 |
| 2023 | Burkard Dregger | CDU | 37.2 |
| 2026 | Pilar Caballero Alvarez | Left | 27.0 |

== Election results ==
=== 2026 election ===
State election (2026): Reinickendorf 1
| Notes: | Blue background denotes the winner of the electorate vote. Pink background denotes a candidate elected from their party list. Yellow background denotes an electorate win by a list member, or other incumbent. A ✓ or ✗ denotes status of any incumbent, win or lose respectively. | | | | | | |
| Party | Candidate | Votes | % | ±% | Party votes | % | ±% |
|---|---|---|---|---|---|---|---|
| Left | Pilar Caballero Alvarez | 4,631 | 27.0 | ▲18.5 | 4,898 | 28.3 | ▲20.1 |
| CDU | ✗ Burkard Dregger | 3,509 | 20.5 | ▼16.7 | 2,972 | 17.2 | ▼17.4 |
| AfD | Marc-Philipp Bernicke | 3,403 | 19.9 | ▲8.3 | 3,494 | 20.2 | ▲8.4 |
| SPD | Bettina König | 2,756 | 16.1 | ▼6.9 | 2,190 | 12.7 | ▼6.7 |
| Greens | Jelisaweta Kamm | 1,336 | 7.8 | ▼3.1 | 1,498 | 8.7 | ▼3.9 |
| BSW | Ömer Aydoǧan | 822 | {{{percentage}}} | | 918 | 5.3 | |
| APT | | | | | 491 | 2.8 | ▼0.4 |
| Volt | Sven Sellmer | 376 | 2.2 | | 267 | 1.5 | ▲0.8 |
| FDP | Peter Dietze-Felberg | 310 | 1.8 | ▼0.7 | 351 | 2.0 | ▼1.0 |
| PARTEI | | | | | 114 | 0.7 | ▼0.8 |
| PdF | | | | | 47 | 0.3 | |
| du. | | | | | 23 | 0.1 | Steady |
| ÖDP | | | | | 18 | 0.1 | Steady |
| DKP | | | | | 18 | 0.1 | |
| SGP | | | | | 5 | 0.0 | Steady |
| Informal votes | | 408 | | | 247 | | |
| Total valid votes | | 17,143 | | | 17,304 | | |
| Turnout | | 17,551 | 62.5 | ▲12.3 | | | |
| Left gain from CDU | Majority | 1,122 | 6.5 | | | | |

=== 2023 repeat election ===
Changes denoted below for the 2023 election are compared to the 2016 election, as the 2021 election was declared invalid.

State election (2023): Reinickendorf 1
| Notes: | Blue background denotes the winner of the electorate vote. Pink background denotes a candidate elected from their party list. Yellow background denotes an electorate win by a list member, or other incumbent. A ✓ or ✗ denotes status of any incumbent, win or lose respectively. | | | | | | |
| Party | Candidate | Votes | % | ±% | Party votes | % | ±% |
|---|---|---|---|---|---|---|---|
| CDU | ✓ Burkard Dregger | 5,056 | 37.2 | ▲10.5 | 4,743 | 34.5 | ▲12.3 |
| SPD | Bettina König | 3,128 | 23.0 | ▼3.3 | 2,653 | 19.3 | ▼4.5 |
| AfD | Thorsten Weiß | 1,571 | 11.5 | ▼7.9 | 1,614 | 11.8 | ▼7.1 |
| Greens | Holger Lütge | 1,480 | 10.9 | ▲2.0 | 1,727 | 12.6 | ▲3.6 |
| Left | Hakan Taș | 1,155 | 8.5 | ▼0.6 | 1,131 | 8.2 | ▼0.6 |
| APT | Juliane Janin | 510 | 3.7 | | 438 | 3.2 | ▲0.6 |
| FDP | Andreas Otto | 348 | 2.6 | ▼2.7 | 412 | 3.0 | ▼2.5 |
| PARTEI | Steffen Männig | 263 | 1.9 | | 196 | 1.4 | ▼0.5 |
| Team Todenhöfer | | | | | 119 | 0.9 | |
| The Grays | | | | | 106 | 0.8 | |
| Volt | | | | | 96 | 0.7 | |
| Gray Panthers | | | | | 77 | 0.6 | ▼2.3 |
| dieBasis | Uwe Skrypczinski | 69 | 0.5 | | 58 | 0.4 | |
| Pirates | | | | | 53 | 0.4 | ▼1.3 |
| Verjüngungsforschung | | | | | 51 | 0.4 | ▼0.3 |
| FW | | | | | 50 | 0.4 | |
| Mieterpartei | | | | | 33 | 0.2 | |
| Klimaliste | | | | | 24 | 0.2 | |
| Humanists | | | | | 24 | 0.2 | |
| du. | | | | | 23 | 0.2 | |
| ÖDP | Andreas Neumann | 26 | 0.2 | | 15 | 0.1 | |
| NPD | | | | | 14 | 0.1 | ▼0.6 |
| Bildet Berlin! | | | | | 13 | 0.1 | |
| DKP | | | | | 12 | 0.1 | Steady |
| REP | | | | | 11 | 0.1 | |
| Bergpartei, die ÜberPartei | | | | | 10 | 0.1 | |
| SGP | | | | | 10 | 0.1 | ▼0.1 |
| The Pinks/Alliance 21 | | | | | 9 | 0.1 | |
| LKR | | | | | 5 | 0.0 | ▼0.4 |
| BüSo | | | | | 3 | 0.0 | ▼0.1 |
| Informal votes | | 266 | | | 166 | | |
| Total valid votes | | 13,606 | | | 13,730 | | |
| Turnout | | 13,910 | 50.2 | ▼5.4 | | | |
| CDU hold | Majority | 2,128 | 14.2 | | | | |

== See also ==
- Politics of Berlin
- House of Representatives of Berlin
