= Diego Palmero =

Mexican politician

- Born: 27 January 1951 (age 75); Veracruz, Mexico
- Occupation: Politician
- Political party: PAN

Diego Palmero Andrade (born 27 January 1951) is a Mexican politician affiliated with the National Action Party (PAN).

In the 2003 mid-terms he was elected to the Chamber of Deputies to represent Veracruz's 17th district during the 59th Congress.
