= Negra Álvarez =

Salvadoran visual artist

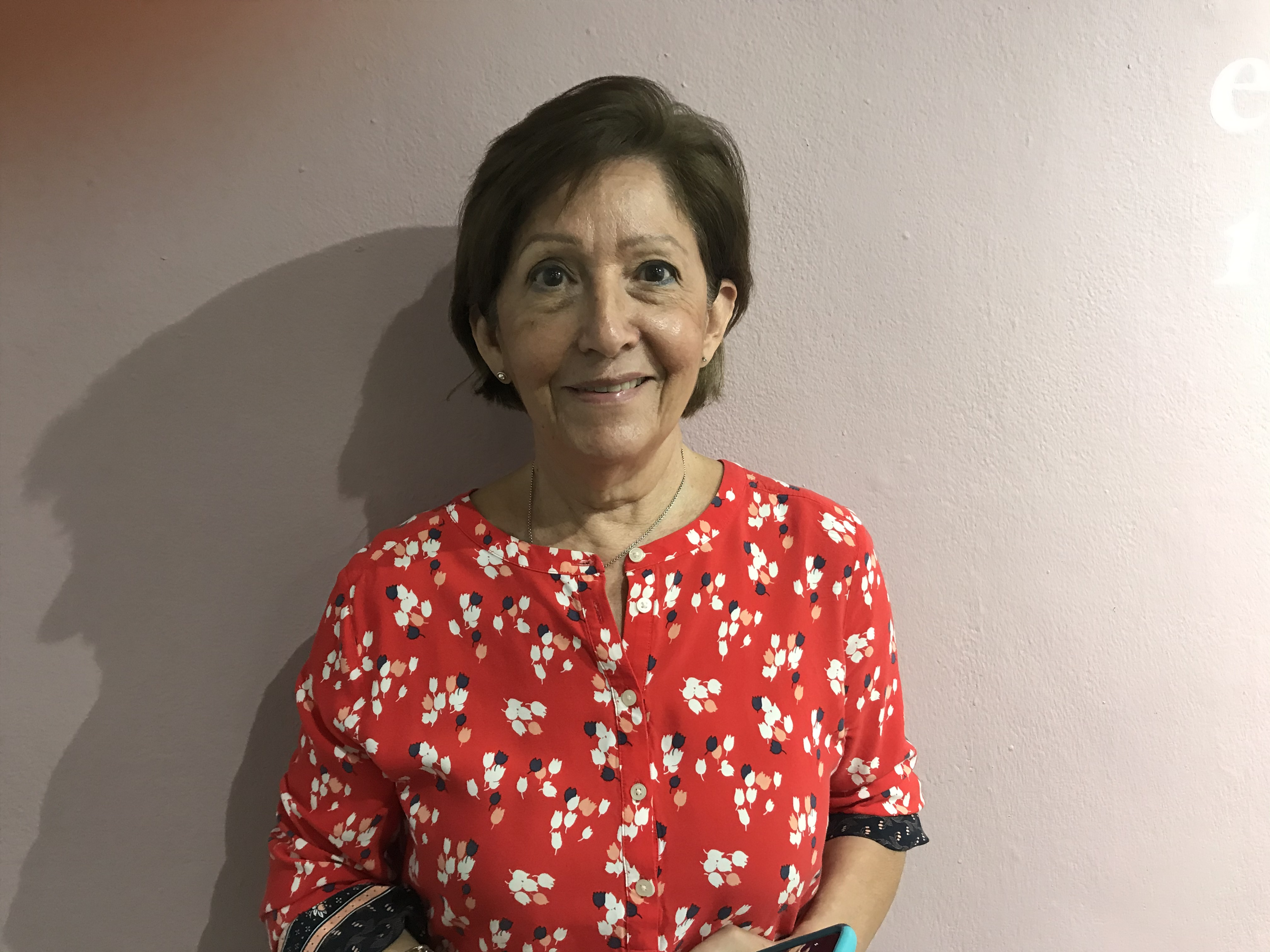
- Born: Margarita Álvarez; 1948 (age 77–78); Santa Ana, El Salvador
- Occupation: Visual artist

Margarita Álvarez de Martínez (born 1948), known artistically as Negra Álvarez, is a Salvadoran visual artist. She is one of the most recognized Latin American sculptors of the 1990s for being one of the first artists to use wood for her sculptural proposals, without the need to carve it.

== Biography ==
Between 1967 and 1969, Álvarez studied at the Academy of Fine Arts in Leuven, and then at the Saint Luc Institute in Brussels, both in Belgium, graduating from the latter in 1970. She returned to El Salvador, where she participated in the embossing and drawing workshops of Benjamín Saúl, and painting, by Carlos Cañas. She works in the restoration of the decoration of the Teatro Nacional de El Salvador and works as a teacher at the School of Arts of the Dr. José Matías Delgado University, where she was elected vice-director, and at the National Center of Arts (CENAR). She worked set designs with the Sol del Río 32 theater group.

Álvarez was vice president (1994) and president (1995) of the Association of Plastic Artists of El Salvador. She is the founder and president of the Cultural Foundation of the 44 de la Heroica Santa Ana since 1996. She has been decorated by the Inter-American Commission of Women of the OAS (1999) and was named Distinguished Painter by the Legislative Assembly of El Salvador (2008).

Álvarez married Dr. Guillermo Martínez in 1973, with whom she has three children: Claudia, Guillermo and Rodrigo.
