= Yadier Álvarez =

Cuban baseball player (born 1996)

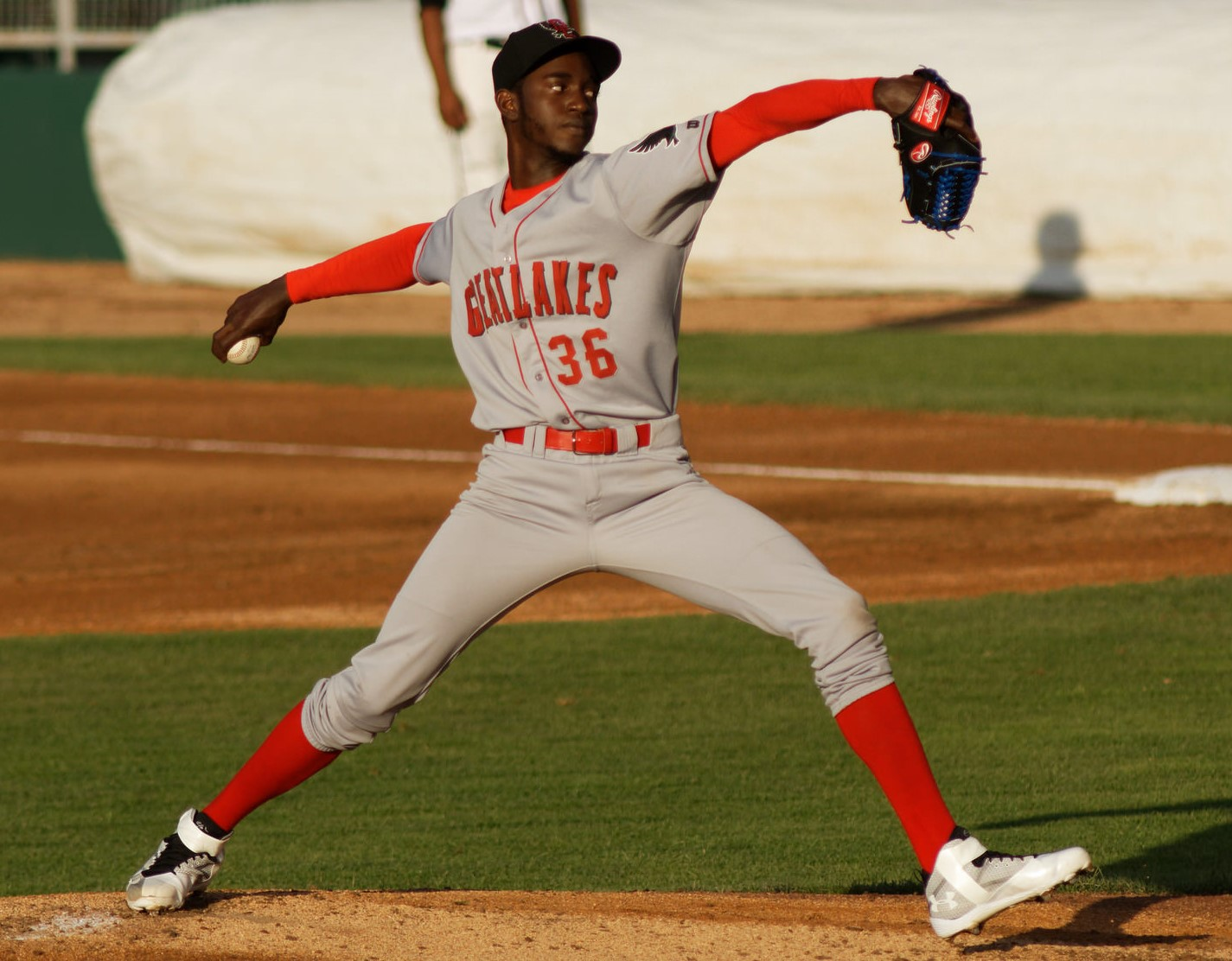
- Álvarez with the Great Lakes Loons
- Pitcher
- Born: March 7, 1996 (age 30); Matanzas, Cuba
- Bats: Right Throws: Right
- Stats at Baseball Reference

Yadier Álvarez Ventosa (born March 7, 1996) is a Cuban former professional baseball pitcher.

== Career ==
Álvarez defected from Cuba to pursue a career in Major League Baseball (MLB). At the time, he had a fastball that touched 98 miles per hour. Scouts believed he had number two starter upside and one National League official said that he was the best 18-year-old pitcher he had ever seen. He received interest from numerous MLB teams including the Philadelphia Phillies, Los Angeles Dodgers and Arizona Diamondbacks.

Ranked as the second best prospect by mlb.com heading into the 2015 international signing period, Álvarez signed with the Dodgers on July 2, 2015, for a $16 million bonus. He made his professional baseball debut for the Dodgers Arizona rookie league affiliate on June 20, 2016, and struck out seven while only allowing one hit in 3 2/3 innings pitched. In five starts for the team, he was 1–1 with a 1.80 ERA and 57 strikeouts. He was promoted to the Great Lakes Loons of the Midwest League and struck out 10 in his debut for the Loons on July 21, 2016. He made nine starts for the Loons with a 2.97 ERA and 55 strikeouts in only 39 1/3 innings. In 2017, he was promoted to the Rancho Cucamonga Quakes of the California League and chosen to represent the world team at the All-Star Futures Game.

Álvarez began 2017 with the Quakes and was promoted to the Double-A Tulsa Drillers at mid-season. Between the two leagues he made 18 starts (and three relief appearances) and was 4–6 with a 4.68 ERA. He returned to Tulsa in 2018 and was selected to represent the Drillers at the mid-season Texas League All-Star Game. In 17 games (eight starts), he went 1–2 with a 4.66 ERA.

The Dodgers added Álvarez to their 40-man roster after the 2018 season, in order to protect him from the Rule 5 draft. He returned to Tulsa to begin 2019, but he only appeared in two games, allowing six runs in 3 2/3 innings. He spent the rest of the season on the minor league injured list before the Dodgers placed him on the restricted list for disciplinary reasons. Álvarez reported for spring training in 2020 with a chance to work his way back into the Dodgers plans but was scratched from his first spring appearance due to health issues and was designated for assignment the next day. He did not pitch again until late in the 2021 season, when he pitched 3 2/3 innings over three games on a rehab assignment for the rookie-level Arizona Complex League Dodgers. Álvarez allowed three runs to score on three hits and a walk while striking out seven. In 2022, he played for the Oklahoma City Dodgers in Triple-A, appearing in 23 games and allowing 17 earned runs in 24 2/3 innings for a 6.20 ERA. He elected free agency following the season on November 10, 2022.
