= Mayra Álvarez =

Mexican material scientist

Mayra Angélica Álvarez Lemus is a Mexican nanoscientist. She is a professor and researcher at the Universidad Juárez Autónoma de Tabasco.

== Education and career ==
Álvarez was an undergraduate at UAM Azcapotzalco, where she earned a degree in chemical engineering. She earned a doctorate in chemistry in 2008 at UAM Iztapalapa.

She has been part of the Mexican national system of researchers since 2009. Initially she worked on nanomedicine, in the team of Tessy María López Goerne at the National Institute of Neurology and Neurosurgery in Tlalpan. She has held her present position at the Universidad Juárez Autónoma de Tabasco since 2013, and has participated there in research on the use of silica nanoparticles in the extraction of petroleum.

== Recognition ==
Álvarez is a member of the Mexican Academy of Sciences and Academia de Catálisis.
