= Francisco Arano Montero =

Mexican politician

- Born: 30 September 1950 (age 75); Tierra Blanca, Veracruz, Mexico
- Education: Universidad Veracruzana
- Occupation: Politician
- Political party: PAN

Francisco Arano Montero (born 30 September 1950) is a Mexican politician from the National Action Party (PAN). In the 2000 general election he was elected to the Chamber of Deputies to represent Veracruz's 17th district during the 58th Congress.
