= José Antonio (footballer, born 1984) =

Spanish footballer

Personal information
- Full name: José Antonio Serrano Ramos
- Date of birth: 6 August 1984 (age 42)
- Place of birth: Madrid, Spain
- Height: 1.76 m (5 ft 9 1/2 in)
- Position: Left-back

Team information
- Current team: Navalcarnero

Youth career
- Getafe

Senior career*
Years	Team	Apps	(Gls)
2003–2008	Getafe B		
2004	Getafe	1	(1)
2008–2009	Toledo	28	(0)
2009–2010	Colmenar Viejo	13	(0)
2010	Marbella	8	(0)
2010–2011	Navalcarnero	34	(3)
2011–2014	Puerta Bonita	70	(1)
2014	Rayo Majadahonda	15	(0)
2014–	Navalcarnero	123	(2)
- * Club domestic league appearances and goals as of 29 July 2020

José Antonio Serrano Ramos (born 6 August 1984), known as José Antonio, is a Spanish former footballer who played as a left-back.

== Club career ==
José Antonio was born in Madrid, and represented Getafe CF as a youth. After making his senior debut with the reserves in 2003 in the regional leagues, he made his first team – and La Liga – debut on 29 August 2004, starting and scoring his team's only in a 1–3 away loss against Real Zaragoza.

José Antonio only left Geta in 2008, and subsequently joined CD Toledo in Tercera División. He subsequently resumed his career in Segunda División B but also in the fourth division in the following seasons, representing AD Colmenar Viejo, Marbella FC, CDA Navalcarnero (two stints), CD Puerta Bonita and CF Rayo Majadahonda.
