= Virginia Pereira Álvarez =

Venezuelan teacher who studied medicine

- Born: 1888; Ciudad Bolívar, Bolívar state, Venezuela
- Died: 12 April 1947 (aged 58–59)
- Known for: First Venezuelan woman to study medicine in Venezuela

Virginia Pereira Álvarez (1888-12 April 1947) was the first Venezuelan woman to enroll in the medicine course in Venezuela.

== Career ==
Pereira Álvarez was born in Ciudad Bolívar, Bolívar state, on 1888, and was a normalist teacher that graduated in 1903. She started her medicine studies in the Central University of Venezuela in 1911, emigrating to the United States in 1912. She established herself in Philadelphia, Pennsylvania, in the Woman's Medical College of Pennsylvania, obtaining her title in 1920. She returned to Venezuela in 1921, being part of the team that along with doctor Arnoldo Gabaldón started researching the possible cures of paludism. She died on 12 April 1947 in Philadelphia because of uncontrolled hypertension and heart complications. Her remains lie in Fernwood Cemetery.
