= Instituto de Estudios Superiores de Administración =

University in Caracas, Venezuela

The Instituto de Estudios Superiores de Administración (Institute of Advanced Studies in Administration, IESA) is a private non-profit Venezuelan business school with campuses in Caracas, Maracaibo and Valencia. It was founded in 1965. It has its own publisher, Ediciones IESA.

== History ==
IESA is considered Venezuela's leading business school, and it played a key role in the liberalization economic policy of the second administration of Carlos Andrés Pérez (1989 - 1993). A number of academics from it (including Moisés Naím and Ricardo Hausmann) were appointed ministers, and the group became known as the "IESA Boys," in analogy to Chile's Chicago Boys.

IESA is accredited by two of the three leading global business school accreditation associations: AACSB and AMBA. It was formerly also accredited by EQUIS (2008–2021). In the 2009 QS Global 200 Business Schools Report the school was ranked 9th in South America.

== Notable people ==
=== Alumni ===
- María Corina Machado, 2025 Nobel Peace Prize winner

=== Faculty ===
- Gil Yepes, Instituto professor from 1972 to 1990

== See also ==
- Category:Academic staff of the Instituto de Estudios Superiores de Administración
