= José Antonio Llama =

Cuban activist (born 1941)

José Antonio Llama (born 1941) was a director on the executive board of the Cuban American National Foundation (CANF). Llama also participated in the Bay of Pigs Invasion.

== Cuban American National Foundation ==
According to Llama, a member of the Cuban American National Foundation recommended "doing more than lobbying in Washington" to overthrow the Cuban Communist government of Fidel Castro in June 1992 during an annual congress meeting in Naples, Florida, with the foundations' general board of directors, including board chairman Jorge Mas Santos, unaware of this at the time. Llama also said that Jorge Mas Canosa and José "Pepe" Hernandez were selected as leaders to choose the group for armed operations. During a 1993 meeting in Puerto Rico, José "Pepe" Hernandez was selected as the group's leader due to his "known record as a fighter in the 2506 Brigade and the Marines".

== Arrest, indictment, and acquittal ==
On October 27, 1997, off the coast of Aguadilla, Puerto Rico, four men were captured by a United States Coast Guard Cutter. The yacht, La Esperanza (English: The Hope), was discovered to be hiding a cache of weapons and military grade intelligence gear, including: two .50 caliber sniper rifles, GPS equipment, lightweight radios, night-vision goggles, and 12 rounds for a .357 pistol. On August 25, 1998, the United States Department of Justice (USDOJ) announced it had indicted Llama with conspiracy to assassinate Cuban leader, Fidel Castro. The USDOJ believed the men were attempting to assassinate Castro when he was in Margarita Island, Venezuela, for the Ibero-American Summit.

A jury acquitted them on December 8, 1999, after a federal judge threw out one of the defendants’ self-incriminating statement, Angel Alfonso Aleman's, who stated upon the ship's boarding by Customs officials that "They are weapons for the purpose of assassinating Fidel Castro."

In a 2006 interview with El Nuevo Herald, Llama declared about a plot to assassinate Castro and said other members of CANF had assisted in securing items, funding, and participating in the plot. Llama stated he disclosed the information because CANF had received US$1.4 million (roughly $2.9 million in 2025) from him between 1994 and 1997 to plan the operation and considered a lawsuit to recover his money. In the interview he mentioned a list of items acquired for carrying out the assassination: a cargo helicopter, ten ultralight radio-controlled planes, seven vessels, and explosives. One of those vessels was the Midnight Express fast boat, meant to take the CANF leader at the time, Jorge Mas Canosa to Cuba if a power struggle erupted or the missions were completed. Another of those vessels, "La Esperanza", was confiscated by the United States Department of the Treasury following the indictments. Llama also said in the interview that he was writing an autobiography.

== See also ==
- Cuba-United States relations
- Opposition to Fidel Castro
