= José Antonio Latorre =

Spanish footballer

Personal information
- Full name: José Antonio Latorre Beaskoetxea
- Date of birth: December 1, 1941 (age 84)
- Place of birth: Bilbao, Spain
- Height: 1.75 m (5 ft 9 in)
- Position: Forward

Senior career*
Years	Team	Apps	(Gls)
1960–1966	Athletic Bilbao	45	(7)
1964–1965	→Indautxu (loan)	11	(4)
1965–1969	Sabadell	10	(0)
- * Club domestic league appearances and goals as of 16:41, 11 April 2021 (UTC)

José Antonio "Txato" Latorre Beaskoetxea (born 1 January 1941) is a Spanish former professional football player. He played as a forward for Athletic Bilbao, Indautxu, and Sabadell.

== Biography ==
When he was young he played for his hometown team, Zorrota Football Club. Athletic Bilbao signed him as a youth and when he was 19 he first played in La Liga. He completed 7 matches and scored one goal. In 1961, when he was 20, he played 16 matches and scored 3 goals. In the 1963/64 season he scored only one goal but the goal was the 2000th in the history of the club on the 14th league day against Real Valladolid in the 88th minute. The worst season for him as a player of Athletic Bilbao was in 1964 because he did not play any match. He decided to go to SD Indautxu to end the season. There he played 11 matches and scored 4 goals. When he returned to Athletic in 1965 he did not play. He moved to CE Sabadell FC for the next 3 years where he did not score and played only 900 minutes. After this, he quit football to work as an engineer for the next 30 years.
