= Armando Alvarez (baseball) =

American baseball player (born 1994)

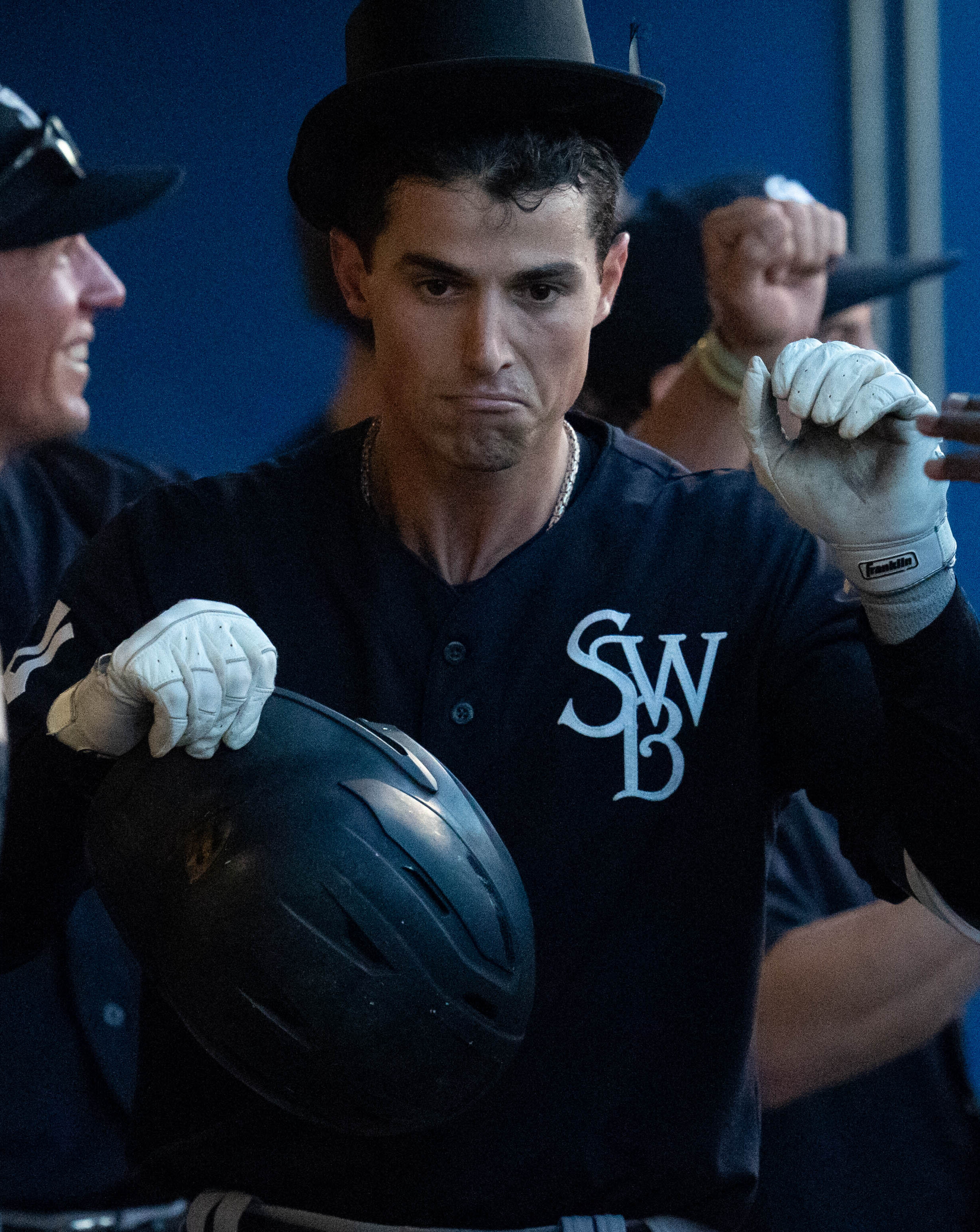
- Álvarez with the Scranton/Wilkes-Barre RailRiders in 2022

Piratas de Campeche – No. 97
- Infielder
- Born: July 14, 1994 (age 32); Miami, Florida, U.S.
- Bats: Left Throws: Right

MLB debut
- June 22, 2024, for the Oakland Athletics

MLB statistics (through 2024 season)
- Batting average: .243
- Home runs: 0
- Runs batted in: 2
- Stats at Baseball Reference

Teams
- Oakland Athletics (2024)

Armando Francisco "Mandy" Alvarez (born July 14, 1994) is an American professional baseball infielder for the Piratas de Campeche of the Mexican League. He has previously played in Major League Baseball (MLB) for the Oakland Athletics.

== Amateur career ==
Alvarez attended Miami Killian Senior High School in Kendall, Florida. He enrolled at Eastern Kentucky University and played college baseball for the Eastern Kentucky Colonels. In 2015, he played collegiate summer baseball with the Wareham Gatemen and the Brewster Whitecaps of the Cape Cod Baseball League.

== Professional career ==
=== New York Yankees ===
The New York Yankees selected Alvarez in the 17th round, with the 518th overall selection, of the 2016 Major League Baseball draft. He split his first professional season between the Low–A Staten Island Yankees and Single–A Charleston RiverDogs, hitting .288 with five home runs and 40 RBI in 66 games. Alvarez split 2017 between Charleston and the High–A Tampa Yankees, playing in 76 games and slashing .243/.277/.299 with no home runs and 21 RBI.

In 2018, he played with Tampa and the Double–A Trenton Thunder. In 108 games between the two affiliates, Alvarez accumulated a .257/.314/.438 batting line with 13 home runs and 56 RBI. In 2019, he played in 124 games split between Trenton and the Triple–A Scranton/Wilkes-Barre RailRiders, batting .270/.325/.417 with 11 home runs and 76 RBI. Alvarez did not play in a game in 2020 due to the cancellation of the minor league season because of the COVID-19 pandemic.

Alvarez returned to action in 2021 with Scranton, making 106 appearances and slashing .236/.304/.389 with 10 home runs and 52 RBI. He played a third year in Scranton in 2022, hitting .278/.319/.525 with a career–high 18 home runs and 55 RBI. Alvarez elected free agency following the season on November 10, 2022.

=== San Francisco Giants ===
On December 10, 2022, Alvarez signed a minor league contract with the San Francisco Giants. He spent the 2023 campaign with the Triple–A Sacramento River Cats, also appearing in eight rehab games for the rookie–level Arizona Complex League Giants. In 74 games for Sacramento, Alvarez slashed .308/.379/.581 with 18 home runs and 58 RBI. He elected free agency following the season on November 6, 2023.

=== Oakland Athletics ===
On November 16, 2023, Alvarez signed a minor league contract with the Oakland Athletics. He began the 2024 season with the Triple–A Las Vegas Aviators. On June 22, 2024, Alvarez was selected to the 40-man roster and was promoted to the major leagues for the first time. He made his major league debut that day against the Minnesota Twins, grounding out against Bailey Ober. The next day, Alvarez collected his first major league hit as part of a 3–for–4, one RBI night against the Los Angeles Angels. In 16 games during his rookie campaign, he slashed .243/.282/.270 with two RBI and one stolen base. On October 31, Alvarez was removed from the 40–man roster and sent outright to Las Vegas. He elected free agency on November 4.

=== Minnesota Twins ===
On January 2, 2025, Alvarez signed a minor league contract with the Minnesota Twins. In 38 appearances for the Triple-A St. Paul Saints, he batted .226/.307/.365 with four home runs and 22 RBI. Alvarez was released by the Twins organization on June 4.

=== Sioux City Explorers ===
On June 15, 2025, Alvarez signed with the Sioux City Explorers of the American Association of Professional Baseball. In four games for Sioux City, Alvarez went 4-for-12 with one home run, four RBI, and five stolen bases.

=== Caliente de Durango ===
On June 29, 2025, Alvarez signed with the Caliente de Durango of the Mexican League. In 30 appearances for Durango, he batted .309/.415/.464 with two home runs, 17 RBI, and two stolen bases. Alvarez was released by the Caliente on March 4, 2026.

=== Saraperos de Saltillo ===
On May 5, 2026, Alvarez signed with the Saraperos de Saltillo of the Mexican League. In nine appearances for the Saraperos, he slashed .167/.267/.208 with three RBI. Alvarez was released by Saltillo on May 22.

=== Piratas de Campeche ===
On June 2, 2026, Alvarez signed with the Piratas de Campeche of the Mexican League.
