= Pilar Caballero Alvarez =

German politician (born 1993)

Member of the Berlin House of Representatives
- Assuming office 29 October 2026
- Succeeding: Burkard Dregger
- Constituency: Reinickendorf 1

Personal details
- Born: 1993 (age 32–33)
- Party: Die Linke (since 2021)

Pilar Caballero Alvarez (born 1993) is a German politician who was elected member of the Berlin House of Representatives in 2026. She has served as co-chair of Die Linke in Reinickendorf since 2024.
