= José Antonio Cabello =

Mexican politician (born 1964)

- Born: 21 July 1964 (age 61); Monterrey, Nuevo León, Mexico
- Occupation: Politician
- Political party: PAN

José Antonio Cabello Gil (born 21 July 1964) is a Mexican politician affiliated with the National Action Party. As of 2014 he served as Deputy of the LIX Legislature of the Mexican Congress as a plurinominal representative.
