= José Antonio Zapata =

Spanish painter

José Antonio Zapata y Nadal
- Born: 1762
- Died: 31 August 1837 (aged 74–75)
- Education: Escuela de San Carlos
- Known for: Flower painting, decorative painting, portraits, religious paintings
- Notable work: Religious paintings in churches in Alzira, El Cabanyal, Palma de Mallorca
- Title: Director of the Department of Decorative Painting (1815)

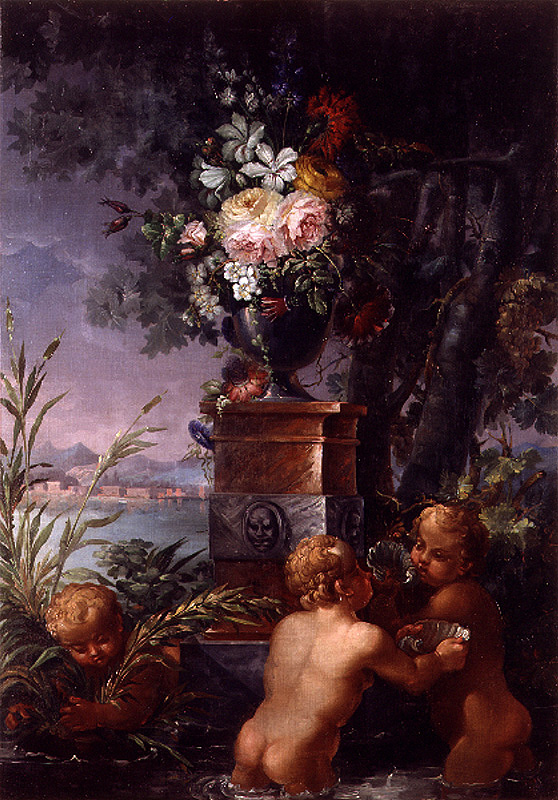
Vase of Flowers with Children Playing in the Water

José Antonio Zapata y Nadal, or y Dadad (1762 – 31 August 1837) was a Spanish painter, active in Valencia.

He studied at the Escuela de San Carlos where he received several awards at the school's competitions; for history painting and, in 1792, first place for flower painting. In 1798, was named a "Member of Merit". In 1815, he was chosen to be Director of the Department of Decorative Painting. He also became an "Academic of Merit" at the Real Academia de Bellas Artes de San Fernando.

Although primarily remembered for his flower paintings and other decorative work, he also created portraits and religious paintings at churches in Alzira, El Cabanyal, Palma de Mallorca and numerous other places.
