= Ada Álvarez =

Cuban operations researcher

Ada Margarita Álvarez Socarrás is a Cuban operations researcher whose research interests include metaheuristics for scheduling and transportation planning. She is a professor and researcher in Mexico, in the Faculty of Mechanical and Electrical Engineering of the Autonomous University of Nuevo León.

== Education and career ==
Álvarez earned a degree in mathematics from the University of Havana in 1982, and completed a PhD at the Central University of Las Villas in Cuba, in 1993.

She joined the Autonomous University of Nuevo León in 1995.

== Recognition ==
Álvarez is a member of the Mexican Academy of Sciences.
