= José Antonio Díaz García =

Mexican politician

- Born: 20 July 1964 (age 61); Puebla, Puebla, Mexico
- Education: UPAEP
- Occupation: Politician
- Political party: PAN

José Antonio Díaz García (born 20 July 1964) is a Mexican politician from the National Action Party. From 2006 to 2009 he served as Deputy of the LX Legislature of the Mexican Congress representing Puebla.
