= José Irene Álvarez Ramos =

Mexican politician

- Born: 26 July 1955 (age 70); Navojoa, Sonora, Mexico
- Education: UNAM
- Occupation: Politician
- Political party: PAN

José Irene Álvarez Ramos (born 26 January 1955) is a Mexican politician affiliated with the National Action Party. He served as Deputy of the LIX Legislature of the Mexican Congress as a plurinominal representative, and previously served in the LVI Legislature of the Congress of Sonora.
