= José Antonio León Mendivil =

Mexican politician

- Born: 17 April 1946 (age 80); Los Mochis, Sinaloa, Mexico
- Occupation: Deputy
- Political party: PRD

José Antonio León Mendivil (born 17 April 1946) is a Mexican politician affiliated with the PRD. As of 2013 he served as Deputy of the LXII Legislature of the Mexican Congress representing Veracruz.
