= Leonel Álvarez (footballer, born 1995) =

Argentine footballer

Personal information
- Full name: Leonel Ignacio Álvarez
- Date of birth: 22 March 1995 (age 31)
- Place of birth: Temperley, Argentina
- Height: 1.79 m (5 ft 10 1/2 in)
- Position: Midfielder

Team information
- Current team: Nueva Chicago (on loan from Deportivo Armenio)

Senior career*
Years	Team	Apps	(Gls)
2017–2019	Independiente	0	(0)
2017–2018	→ Atlanta (loan)	21	(0)
2020	Delfines del Este	0	(0)
2020–2023	Deportivo Armenio	34	(6)
2022	→ Nueva Chicago (loan)	33	(4)
2023	→ Güemes (loan)	24	(0)
2024-	Macará	30	(0)
- * Club domestic league appearances and goals as of 19:02, 30 Dec 2024 (UTC)

Leonel Ignacio Álvarez (born 22 March 1995) is an Argentine professional footballer who plays as a midfielder for Club Deportivo Macará.

== Career ==
Álvarez was an unused substitute for Argentine Primera División side Independiente in March 2017 against San Martín, prior to making his senior debut in the Copa Argentina on 17 May versus Atlético Camioneros. On 30 August 2017, Álvarez was loaned out to Primera B Metropolitana's Atlanta. His first appearance for Atlanta was also in the Copa Argentina, as he played the full ninety minutes as the club knocked Primera División team Belgrano out. On 14 October, Álvarez made his professional league debut in a 2–2 draw with Barracas Central. Upon returning to Independiente, he spent the next twelve months with their reserves.

Álvarez's contract with Independiente came to an end in June 2019. In March 2020, Álvarez was announced as a new signing for Liga Dominicana outfit Delfines del Este. He wouldn't appear competitively in the Dominican Republic due to the COVID-19 pandemic. On 28 August 2020, Álvarez returned to Argentina with Deportivo Armenio of Primera B Metropolitana. In January 2022, Álvarez was loaned out to Primera Nacional club Nueva Chicago.

== Career statistics ==
As of 28 September 2020.

Club statistics
Club	Season	League			Cup		League Cup		Continental		Other		Total	
Club	Season	Division	Apps	Goals	Apps	Goals	Apps	Goals	Apps	Goals	Apps	Goals	Apps	Goals
Independiente	2016–17	Primera División	0	0	1	0	—		0	0	0	0	1	0
Independiente	2017–18	Primera División	0	0	0	0	—		1 (Note: Appearance(s) in Copa Sudamericana)	0	0	0	1	0
Independiente	2018–19	Primera División	0	0	0	0	—		0	0	0	0	0	0
Independiente	Total		0	0	1	0	—		1	0	0	0	2	0
Atlanta (loan)	2017–18	Primera B Metropolitana	21	0	2	0	—		—		0	0	23	0
Delfines del Este	2020	Liga Dominicana	0	0	0	0	—		—		0	0	0	0
Deportivo Armenio	2020–21	Primera B Metropolitana	0	0	0	0	—		—		0	0	0	0
Career total			21	0	3	0	—		1	0	0	0	25	0

== Honours ==
Independiente

- Copa Sudamericana: 2017
