= José Luis Álvarez Martínez =

Mexican politician

- Born: 5 October 1968 (age 57); Veracruz, Mexico
- Occupation: Politician
- Political party: PRI

José Luis Álvarez Martínez (born 5 October 1968) is a Mexican politician from the Institutional Revolutionary Party (PRI). From 2010 to 2012 he served as a deputy during the 61st Congress, representing Veracruz's 17th district as the alternate of José Tomás Carrillo Sánchez.
