= José Antonio Porcel =

José Antonio Porcel (September 1715 – 21 January 1794) was a Spanish poet and writer.

Porcel was born and died in Granada, Andalusia. His work was influenced by both Luis de Góngora and Garcilaso de la Vega, among others. Alonso Verdugo y Castilla, also a Spanish poet, was a personal friend and patron of Porcel.

Rococo aethethics, attention to detail and intimacy are all visible in Porcel's poetry. His work can also be described as Baroque, but with more regular syntax.
