= Gil Yepes =

José Antonio Gil Yepes is a Venezuelan sociologist president of the polling firm Datanálisis between 1989 and 2011. He was professor at the Venezuelan business school Instituto de Estudios Superiores de Administración (IESA) from 1972 to 1990.

== Background ==
After graduating in sociology from the Central University of Venezuela, Gil Yepes obtained a PhD in sociology and public administration from Northwestern University in the United States.

== Career ==
=== Academia ===
Gil Yepes was professor at Instituto de Estudios Superiores de Administración (IESA) from 1972 to 1990. He also held positions at Pennsylvania State University, Andrés Bello Catholic University and Simón Bolívar University.

=== Business ===
Gil Yepes has been a director of a variety of companies, including Banco de Venezuela (when it was owned by Grupo Santander) and Chocolates El Rey. He was director of the Caracas Stock Exchange and Caracas Chamber of Commerce. He was a member of COPRE (the presidential commission on state reform) from 1985 to 1994. Between 1989 and 2011, he was president of Caracas-based polling firm Datanálisis.

== Books ==
- Explorations is search of the definition and explicantes of left radical behavior among college students, 1970
- Development of radical identities in a social circle of white Northwestern University students, Northwestern University, 1974
- El reto de las élites, Tecnos, 1978, published in English as The challenge of Venezuelan democracy, New Brunswick: Transaction Books, 1981
- La centro democracia: El modelo de sociedad preferido por los venezolanos. El Nacional. 2009
