= Pero Alvarez =

Portuguese slave

Pero Alvarez was a man who came to England from Portugal, and had been enslaved. Henry VII of England formally declared him free of his slavery, which was not then a recognised state in England. This was a legal proof that was later used as a precedent and was accepted in 1490 by Joao II of Portugal.
