= José Antonio Sosa =

Spanish professor of architecture

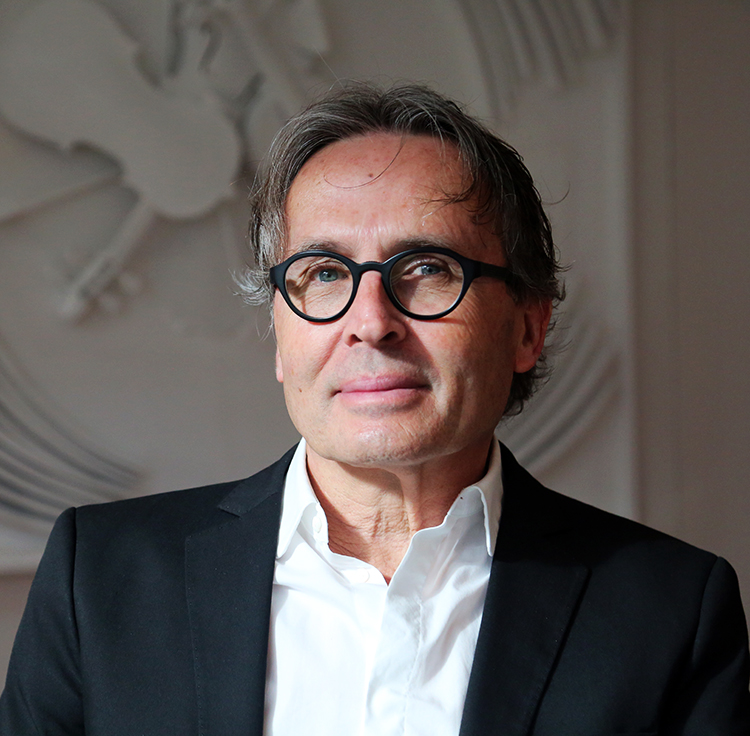
- Born: José Antonio Sosa Diaz-Saavedra; 8 May 1957 (age 69); Las Palmas, Spain
- Occupations: Architect, university professor

José Antonio Sosa Diaz-Saavedra (born 8 May 1957, Las Palmas) is a Spanish architect, university professor and researcher. He is a member of the Royal Canarian Academy of Fine Arts of St. Michael Archángel.

== Early life and education ==
José Antonio Sosa Díaz-Saavedra was brought up in a family with an interest in art and history, especially in relation to the Canary Islands. As a result, he was encouraged to study architecture, graduating from the Superior Technical School of Architecture of Madrid in 1981. In 1994, he earned a Ph.D. at the School of Architecture, University of Las Palmas de Gran Canaria.

== Teaching ==
After completing his doctoral studies, he obtained the chair of Architectural Projects in the Department of Graphic Expression and Architectural Projects of the EALPGC, School of Architecture of Las Palmas de Gran Canaria, where he has been since 1983.

In the year 2000 he was visiting scholar and taught in the Department of Architecture, belonging to the Graduate School of Design, Harvard University, he has also participated as a jury in several universities among which is the Swiss Federal Institute of Technology, ETH (Studio Basel).

In 2015 he joined the University Institute of Intelligent Systems and Numerical Applications in Engineering of the ULPGC, University of Las Palmas de Gran Canaria.

== Main architecture contributions ==
José Antonio Sosa has been the main proponent of modern architectural development in the early twentieth century in the Canary Islands and Spain, promoting its place in the history of urban and cultural heritage. As a result, he was appointed a member of the Royal Canarian Academy of Fine Arts of St. Michael Archángel.

In 1996 Professor Sosa joined his studio with that of Magüi González, creating the Nred Arquitectos Group, which has since worked on such projects as the City of Justice (New Law Courts Headquarters) and the rehabilitation of the Town Halls (Town Hall Houses) of Las Palmas de Gran Canaria.

Since 2011, he has founded a new studio for architecture and urban planning together with Evelyn Alonso Rohner.

In 2015 José Antonio Sosa is the managing editor of the Arquiatesis editorial line for the publication and publication of theses and research works in architecture.

=== Individual and Collective exhibitions ===
Sosa, has participated in the following exhibitions:

- 1997 "Hard & Soft" Eight Floor Gallery, (New York), USA
- 2003 "One is always Two", Professional Architects Association (Tenerife), Spain
- 2003 "Spaces for intimacy" Hall los Aljibes (Lanzarote), Spain
- 2004 "DakÁrt Biennial" (Dakar), Senegal
- 2005 "Sao Paulo Architecture Biennial", Brazil.
- 2005 "Architecture for Justice" COAC. (Madrid), Spain
- 2007 "Individual exhibition": Nred Architects, Literary Cabinet. (Las Palmas), Spain
- 2007 "Regeneration Strategy", Nacional Library. (Pekín), China
- 2007 "Refabricating City "Shenzhen & Hong Kong, Biennial of Urban Planning and Architecture. (Hong Kong), China
- 2007 "Xisi Bei street". (Beijing), China
- 2008 "Gallery AEDES". (Berlin), Germany
- 2008" Sustainable Building. (Melbourne), Australia
- 2007–2009 "Biennial of Art, Architecture and landscape of Canarias". (Las Palmas), Spain
- 2009 "Object Art" Manuel Ojeda Gallery. (Las Palmas), Spain
- 2010–2011 "A city called Spain". (Athens-Moscow), Greece-Russia
- 2015–2016 Exhibition at the MAXXI (Museo Nazionale delle Arti del XXI Secolo in Rome), Italy.
- 2017 "In process". Exhibition of architectural models by Alonso-Sosa in the Saro León Gallery. (Las Palmas), Spain.

=== Acknowledgments ===
==== Academy Member ====
- Admission of José Antonio Sosa Díaz-Saavedra into the Real Academia de Bellas Artes de Canarias of San Miguel Arcangel (Royal Canarian Academy of Fine Arts of St. Michael Archángel.), 2014.

==== Awards ====
Professor Sosa has been awarded in the following competitions:

- 2006 First prize, The Venegas Public Square and Underground Car Park
- 2005 First prize, Puerto del Rosario Waterfront
- 2005 First prize, La Regenta Art Center
- 2004 First prize, the City of Justice (New Law Courts Headquarter) in Las Palmas.
- 2002 First prize, The Rehabilitation (building restoration) of the Town Hall Las Palmas, Gran Canaria
- 1997 First prize, The Rehabilitation (building restoration) of the Literary Cabinet "Design and Ideas"
- 2008 Third prize, The Madrid. Slaughterhouse
- 2008 First prize, Rehabilitation, Consistorial Houses of the Palmas de Gran Canaria (Melbourne Sustainable Building)
- 2008 First Accésit, For Architectural Renovation (building restoration) of the Old Tabakalera in Donostia-San Sebastián
- 2012 First prize, Railway Station of Playa del Inglés
- 2013 Second prize, Station-20, Sophia, Bulgaria
- 2016 First prize, A House in a Garden, Gran Canaria

== Buildings ==
Some of them are:

- 2003 Loyola`s Foundation Administrative building, Spain
- 2003 The Elongated House. (Gran Canaria), Spain (In collaboration with Miguel Santiago),
- 2004 The Hidden House. (Gran Canaria), Spain
- 2008 Rehabilitación (building restoration) Town Hall of (Las Palmas), Spain (In collaboration with Magüi González)
- 2010 Black Pavilion. (Las Palmas), Spain
- 2010 Art Center, La Regenta. (Las Palmas), Spain
- 2011 The Z House. (Gran Canaria), Spain
- 2011 Station-20. (Sophia), Bulgaria
- 2012 Railway Station of Playa del Inglés. (Las Palmas), Spain
- 2012 The City of Justice,"New Law Courts Headquarter". (Las Palmas), Spain. (Jointly with Magüi González y Miguel Santiago)
- 2012 Central Library of Helsinki, Finland (Jointly with Evelyn Alonso Rohner)
- 2014 Philologicum of Munich, Germany (Jointly with Evelyn Alonso Rohner)
- 2014 The Loft Apartment, emblematic house intervention and renewal. (Las Palmas), Spain (Jointly with Evelyn Alonso Rohner).
- 2014 Total building rehabilitation Buganvilla Apartments. (Gran Canaria), Spain. (Jointly with Evelyn Alonso Rohner).
- 2015–16 Industrial building renewal, Group Volkswagen franchisee “Majuelos” La Laguna, Tenerife, Spain. (Jointly with Evelyn Alonso Rohner)
- 2016–17 Rehabilitation of the Industrial and Commercial Building “La Loza” (Las Palmas), Spain. (Jointly with Evelyn Alonso Rohner).

== Publications ==
=== Books ===
Sosa has published the following texts:

- En Proceso, José Antonio Sosa, Evelyn Alonso, David Alemán, Vidania Báez, Álvaro del Amo, Carlos Marrero, 2017 ISBN 978-84-697-5304-0
- Confluences. José Antonio Sosa, Magūi González, Miguel Santiago, Evelyn Alonso, Author: Ana Maria Torres, Publisher: Cinisello Balsamo, Milano Silvana,2015, ISBN 9788836630189
- Paisajes de Encuentro. José Antonio Sosa, 2007 ISBN 978-84-7947-432-4
- Redes. José Antonio Sosa, 2007 ISBN 978-84-611-6387-8
- Corralejo. José Antonio Sosa, 2007 ISBN 978-84-614-2065-0
- Nred Arquitectos, Compilación. José Antonio Sosa, Maria L. Gonzalez, Graham Thomson, Clara Jiménez, Publisher: Literary Cabinet of Las Palmas, 2006 ISBN 978-84-611-3851-7
- Cultivo. José Antonio Sosa, Eva Alfonso, Hector Sanchez 2005 ISBN 978-84-7931-043-1
- Hibridaciones. José Antonio Sosa, Eva Alfonso, Hector Sanchez 2005 ISBN 978-84-7931-042-4
- Aprendiendo del Territorio. José Antonio Sosa, Pedro Nicolas Romera, 2004 ISBN 978-84-609-0777-0
- Arquitectura Moderna y Turismo: 1925–1965: Proceedings IV Congreso DOCOMOMO Iberian Foundation, José Antonio Sosa Díaz-Saavedra, Carmen Jordá Such, Nuno Portas, DOCOMOMO Iberian Foundation of Valencia, 2003 ISBN 84-609-2997-3
- La Casa del Marino, Las Palmas de Gran Canaria, 1958–1964: José Antonio Sosa, Miguel Martín-Fernández, Colegio de Arquitectos de Almería, 2002. ISBN 84-921038-8-4
- Contextualismo y Abstracción. Interrelaciones entre suelo, paisaje y arquitectura, 1994 ISBN 84-606-2613-X

=== Articles ===
Among them are:

- Introspecciones Elocuentes. José Antonio Sosa Díaz-Saavedra Annals of the Royal Canarian Academy of Fine Arts of San Miguel Arcángel..: RACBA, ISSN 2174-1484, Nº. 8, 2015, págs. 165-168
- Naturalezas Abstractas. José Antonio Sosa Díaz-Saavedra, Annals of the Royal Canarian Academy of Fine Arts of San Miguel Arcángel.: RACBA, ISSN 2174-1484, Nº. 7, 2014, págs. 143-152
- Armazones. José Antonio Sosa Díaz-Saavedra, Transfer, ISSN 1695-1778, Nº. 5, 2003, pág. 107
- Condiciones de Contorno. Official Magazine, Colegio de Arquitectos de Madrid (COAM), ISSN 0004-2706, Nº. 345, 2006, págs.
- Espacios sin Sombra. José Antonio Sosa Díaz-Saavedra, Official Magazine, Colegio de Arquitectos de Madrid (COAM), ISSN 0004-2706, Nº. 330, 2003, págs. 48-5
- Una Nube en una Jaula, (La Maison Suspendu). José Antonio Sosa Díaz-Saavedra y, Paul Nelson Official Magazine, Colegio de Arquitectos de Madrid (COAM), ISSN 0004-2706, Nº. 328, 2002, págs. 20-27
- Capó y Envolventes. José Antonio Sosa Díaz-Saavedra y Magüi González, Basa, ISSN 0213-0653, Nº. 24, 2001, págs. 138-145
- Coello de Portugal en Canarias. José Antonio Sosa Díaz-Saavedra, Basa, ISSN 0213-0653, Nº. 22, 2000, págs. 20-41
- Constructores de Ambientes. del mat-building a la lava programática, José Antonio Sosa Díaz-Saavedra Quaderns 220, 1998
- Vacío: deriva y captura. José Antonio Sosa Díaz-Saavedra y Magüi González, Basa, ISSN 0213-0653, Nº. 19, 1996, págs. 68-71
- El Cabildo Racionalista de Gran Canaria "Alejandro de la Sota" y el proyecto para su ampliación. José Antonio Sosa Díaz-Saavedra, Magui González, Official Magazine, Colegio de Arquitectos de Madrid (COAM), ISSN 0004-2706, Nº. 300, 1994, págs. 42-48
- El Paisaje como Premisa de Proyecto en el Movimiento Moderno. José Antonio Sosa Díaz-Saavedra, Félix J. Bordes Caballero), Basa, ISSN 0213-0653, Nº. 16, 1994, págs. 98-103
- Doce Apartamentos en Playa del Inglés. Playa del Inglés "Gran Canaria", José Antonio Sosa Díaz-Saavedra y Francisco Campos, Basa, ISSN 0213-0653, Nº. 10, 1989, págs. 98-101
- Ideas y Obras. José Antonio Sosa Díaz-Saavedra, Basa, ISSN 0213-0653, Nº. 2, 1984 (Book dedicated to: Eduardo Westerdahl), págs. 33-36
