= José Antonio Cotrina =

Awarded Spanish fantasy writer

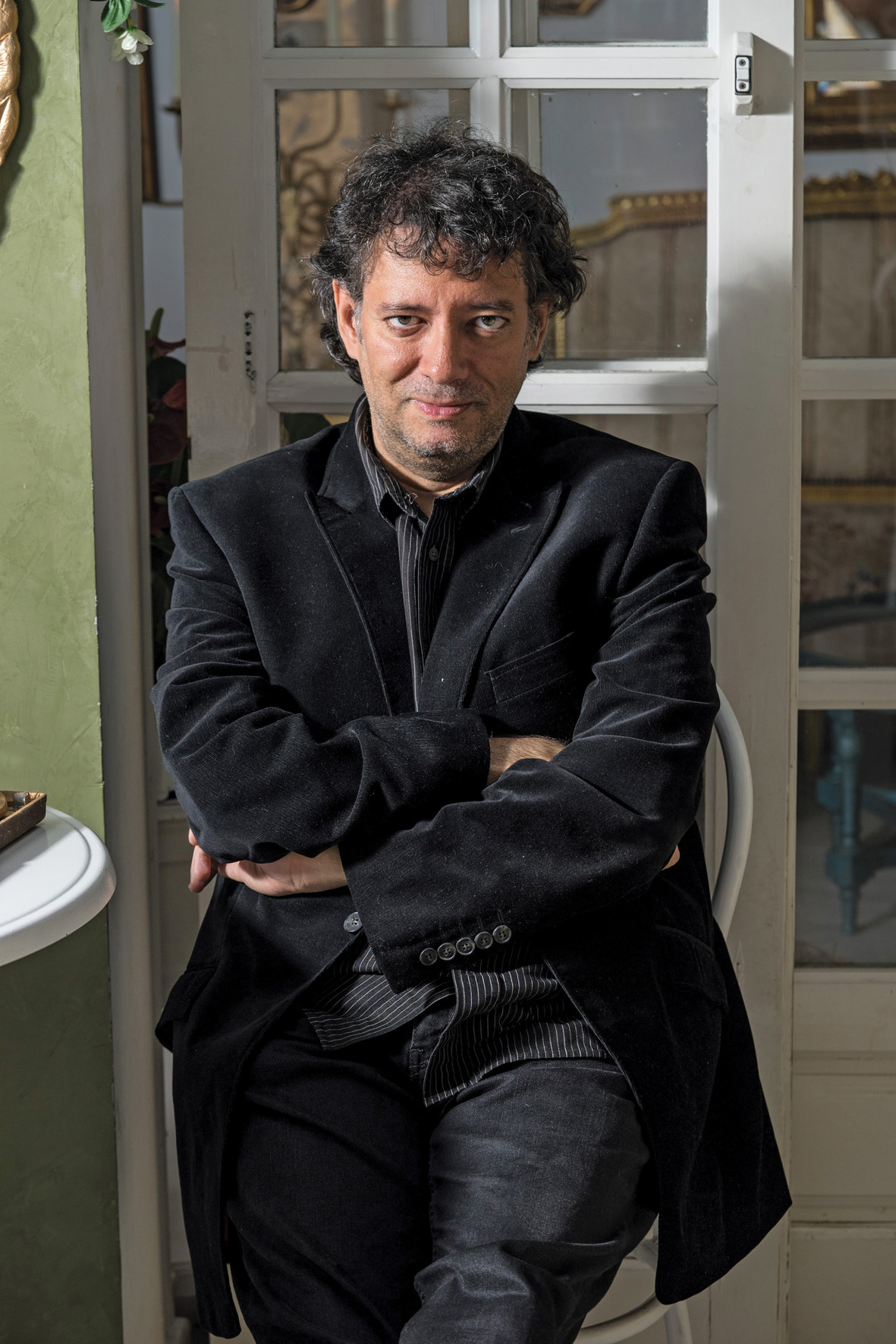
- José Antonio Cotrina
- Born: José Antonio Cotrina; 8 July 1972 (age 54); Vitoria-Gasteiz, Spain
- Occupation: Author
- Writing career
- Years active: 1992–present
- Genres: Fantasy, horror, science fiction, dark fantasy
- Notable works: The Lost Sources, The Secret Song of the World, The Cycle of the Red Moon Trilogy
- Notable awards: Alberto Magno Award (1998, 2000, 2002, 2005, 2007, 2011 and 2012), UPC Award (2000), Domingo Santos Award (2003), Ignotus Award (2005)
- Website: cotrina.net

José Antonio Cotrina (born in Vitoria-Gasteiz, Spain, July 8, 1972) is a Spanish writer, focused mainly on the fantasy, science fiction and horror genres. He is best known for his novels set in the Between the Lines Universe and for his trilogy, The Cycle of the Red Moon.

== Biography ==
José Antonio Cotrina graduated with a degree in Advertising and Public Relations, but quickly found a passion for fantasy writing, in all its variations. He started publishing his works in the early 1990s, mostly short stories, and then wrote the novel The Lost Sources in 2003. This was the first of his novels set in the Between the Lines Universe. Since then, he oriented his writing toward young adult literature, with books such as The House on the Black Hill, the trilogy The Cycle of the Red Moon, The Secret Song of the World, and The End of Dreams (written with Gabriella Campbell.) He received various awards, such as the UPC Short Novel Award for Out of Phase, the Alberto Magno Fantasy Award, which he won on various occasions., and the Kelvin Award for Best Young Adult Fantasy Novel for The Gates to Infinity, written with Victor Conde.

His stories are characterized by a mixture of different genres, mostly fantasy and horror, which makes him a premier example of the Spanish dark fantasy writer. His most known books are the Between the Lines Universe novels, in which a secret and magical world, hidden to most people, co-exists with our real, ordinary world; and his trilogy of novels known as The Cycle of the Red Moon, about a group of teenagers seduced by a demigod of a kingdom called Rocavarancolia, who leads them through a magical portal. Once there, the chosen twelve discover a terrifying truth: they must survive on this horrifying and devastated world until the Red Moon comes out again.

The main characteristics of Cotrina's books are his unusual settings, the surprising plot twists, the depth of the characters, and a taste for the dark and macabre.

His most recent novel is Fractal (2020).

His work has been translated into English, Polish, Czech, Italian and Chinese.

In September 2020, The Harvest of Samhein, the first volume of his trilogy The Red Moon Cycle, was published in the United States of America and in Canada, both in English and Spanish. The second and third volumes will follow shortly.

Together with Gabriella Campbell, he writes and coordinates a bi-weekly newsletter called “The Strange and the Amazing,” where they both review the latest news related to Fantasy writing.

== Bibliography ==
Unless otherwise noted, sourced from list at Tercera Fundación.

=== Novels ===
- Lilith, the Judgement of the Gorgon and the Salgari’s Smile (Lilith, el juicio de la Gorgona y La Sonrisa de Salgari) (Short novel), 1999. Between the Lines Universe.
- Out of Phase (Salir de fase) (Short novel), 2001. Universe of the change.
- Time-Out (Tiempo muerto) (Short novel), 2002.
- Dawn (Amanecer) (Short novel), 2003.
- The Lost Sources (Las fuentes perdidas), 2003. Between the Lines Universe.
- The Pyramid (La pirámide) (Short novel), 2002. Between the Lines Universe.
- A Bad Streak (Mala racha) (Short novel), 2002. Universe of the change.
- Argos (Argos) (Short novel), 2006.
- The House on the Black Hill (La casa de la colina negra), 2006.
- The Harvest of Samhein (La cosecha de Samhein), 2009. The Cycle of the Red Moon Saga.
- The Children of Darkness (Los hijos de las tinieblas), 2010. The Cycle of the Red Moon Saga.
- The Shadow of the Moon (La sombra de la luna), 2011. The Cycle of the Red Moon Saga.
- Moon of Madness (Luna de locos) (Short novel), 2011.
- Haunted Castle (Castillo fantasma) (Gamebook), 2011.
- The Secret Song of the World (La canción secreta del mundo), 2013. Between the Lines Universe.
- The End of Dreams (El fin de los sueños), 2014, with Gabriella Campbell.
- You are a Supervillain (Eres un supervillano) (Gamebook), 2015.
- The Gates to Infinity (Las puertas del infinito), 2016, with Víctor Conde.
- The Day of the Dragon (El día del dragón), 2016, with Gabriella Campbell.
- Chronicles of the End: A Crack in the Sky (Crónicas del fin: una grieta en el cielo), 2018, with Gabriella Campbell.
- The Night of the Ghost (La noche del espectro), 2018, with Gabriella Campbell.
- Drift Away (La deriva), 2018.
- Fractal (Fractal), 2020
- Coda (Coda), 2021. The Cycle of the Red Moon Saga.

=== Short stories ===
- Crucifixion (Crucifixión), 1992.
- The Night (La noche), 1992.
- Autumn (Otoño), 1992.
- Storm (Tormenta), 1992.
- The Night of the Three Moons (La noche de las tres lunas), 1993.
- Cripple (Tullido), 1994.
- Destiny Soberbia (Destino Soberbia), 1999. Between the Lines Universe.
- Between the Lines (Entre líneas), 2000. Included in The SFWA European Hall of Fame, Tor Books, 2007. Between the Lines Universe.
- The Rabbits of War (Los conejos de la guerra), 2000.
- Chasing a Dream (Perseguir un sueño), 2000.
- Dreaming Soberbia: The Architect (Soñando Soberbia: el arquitecto), 2000. Between the Lines Universe.
- Three Nights and a Twilight (Tres noches y un crepúsculo), 2000. Between the Lines Universe.
- Emerald (Esmeralda), 2002.
- The Dead Girl (La niña muerta), 2004.
- Cities (Ciudades), 2012.
- Hidden (Ocultos), 2016.

== Awards ==
Unless otherwise noted, sourced from list at Tercera Fundación.

- 1998— Lilith, the Judgement of the Gorgon and the Salgari’s Smile. X Alberto Magno Award, by University of Basque Country, second position.
- 2000— The Rabbits of War. EMM Award.
- 2000— A Bad Streak. XII Alberto Magno Award, by University of Basque Country.
- 2000— Out of Phase. UPC Award for short novel, by the Polytechnic University of Catalonia.
- 2003— The Dead Girl. Domingo Santos Award.
- 2005— The Dead Girl. Ignotus Award for best short story.
- 2005— Dawn. Ignotus Award for best short novel, by University of Basque Country.
- 2005— Argos. XVII Alberto Magno Award, by University of Basque Country
- 2007— Moon of Madness. XIX Alberto Magno Award, by University of Basque Country.
- 2010— The Children of Darkness. The Temple of the Thousand Doors Award for best young adult novel within a saga.
- 2011— Wasteland. XXIII Alberto Magno Award, by University of Basque Country, second position.
- 2011— The Shadow of the Moon. The Temple of the Thousand Doors Award for best young adult novel within a saga.
- 2012— Fallen God. XXIV Alberto Magno Award, by University of Basque Country.
- 2013— The Secret Song of the World. The Temple of the Thousand Doors Award for best young adult stand-alone novel.
- 2017— The Gates to Infinity. Kelvin Award for best young adult national novel.
- 2023— The Harvest of Samhein. Best Foreign Translated Fantasy Literature, at the Fórum Fantástico in Lisbon, Portugal.

== Sources ==
=== News ===
- "Exclusive Cover Reveal + Excerpt: Teens Survive a Demigod in José Antonio Cotrina's Fantasy Trilogy". Paste. September 12, 2019. Archived from the original on December 5, 2019.
- Gabriella Campbell and José Antonio Cotrina present their book Chronicles of the End: A Crack in the Sky at the Celsius Festival in Avilés, Spain
- Article on José Antonio Cotrina, at Cyberdark
- Listing of José Antonio Cotrina’s bibliography, at Tercera Fundación

=== Reviews ===
- Reviews of The SFWA European Hall of Fame, Tor Books, 2007
- Review of A Bad Streak (in Spanish)
- Review of The Lost Sources (in Spanish)
- Review of The Secret Song of the World (in Spanish)
- Review of The Cycle of the Red Moon (in Spanish)
- Review of The House on the Black Hill (in Spanish), at Cinco Días-El País
