= José Antonio Álvarez Condarco =

José Antonio Alvarez Condarco
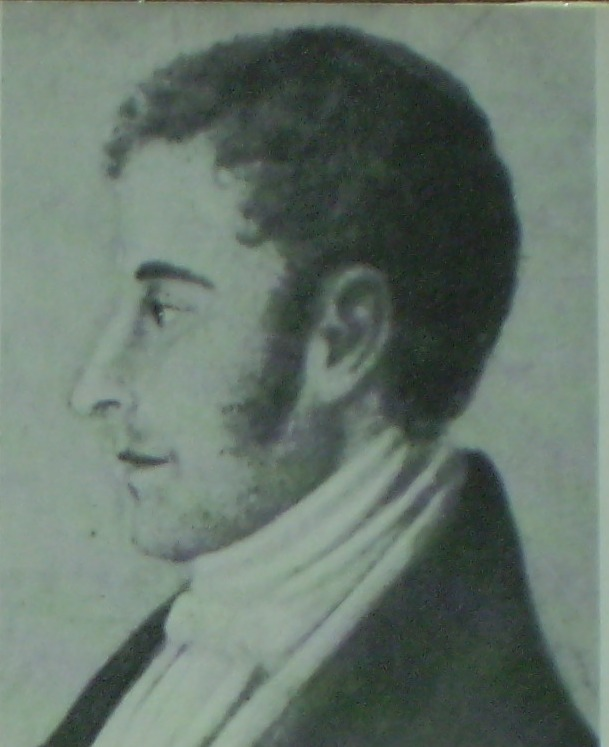
- José Antonio Álvarez Condarco
- Born: 1780; Tucumán
- Died: 17 December 1855 (aged 74–75); Santiago de Chile
- Occupation: Chilean Minister in London
- Notable work: Bought warships and raised officers and men for the Chilean Navy

José Antonio Álvarez Condarco (1780–1855) was an Argentine soldier, manufacturer of explosives and cartographer. He also served as Aide-de-camp and private secretary to general José de San Martín.

== Biography ==
He was born at San Miguel de Tucumán in what was then the Viceroyalty of Río de la Plata. His father was the alcalde. In his youth, he belonged to a branch of the revolutionary Lautaro Lodge which had been established in Tucumán by José Moldes. In 1810, he was living in Buenos Aires and enthusiastically supported the May Revolution. At the end of that year, he and Antonio Álvarez Jonte were sent to Chile on a diplomatic mission, where they established a military alliance between the revolutionaries of both countries. From there, he relocated to Lima, where there were no similar revolutionary movements. After being arrested several times, he returned to Río de la Plata and settled in Córdoba.

=== Military career ===
In 1812, he became an officer in the artillery. His knowledge of explosives led him to be named director of the newly established gunpowder factory in Córdoba. In 1813, he participated in the campaigns of colonel Juan Gregorio de Las Heras in Chile, with the mission of managing the arsenal for the patriotic forces. There, he made friends with Marcos González de Balcarce, whom he employed as an intermediary for transmitting important messages to general San Martín, who was then the governor of Cuyo Province. San Martín valued his patriotism and decided that he wanted to have him by his side. Later, he sent him on a secret mission to Buenos Aires, to consult with Supreme Director Juan Martín de Pueyrredón. Together, they were able to establish what types and quantities of war materiel would be necessary for the Andean campaign.

At the end of 1816, San Martín sent him to Chile, with the apparent mission of delivering letters to Casimiro Marcó del Pont, the Spanish governor. In reality, San Martín wanted to employ his skills as a cartographer to discover the best path for the army to cross the cordillera. He originally crossed through the Paso de Los Patos. Marcó del Pont sent him to return by what he knew to be the shortest path, the Paso de Uspallata. The maps that Álvarez Condarco drew from memory were essential to the successful Andean crossing to Chile made by the Army of the Andes.

He acted as San Martín's aide-de-camp and fought in the Battle of Chacabuco. In 1818, he was sent to England with £20,000 to buy warships and recruit sailors for the First Chilean Navy Squadron. While there, he persuaded Lord Thomas Cochrane to accept command of the squadron.

=== Later life ===
He retired from the army shortly after the Freedom Expedition of Perú and remained in Chile, where he was engaged in building roads. For a short time, he did the same in Bolivia and Mendoza Province. Afterwards, he returned to Chile, where he taught mathematics. For a time, he was chief of the Department of Engineering and Roads for the Republic of Chile.

He was unable to return to Argentina because of his public opposition to the régime of Juan Manuel de Rosas. He lived in Chile until his death in 1855, in Santiago de Chile. He died in poverty and his friends had to cover the cost of his burial.
