= José Antonio Vivó Undabarrena =

Spanish politician (1930–1979)

José Antonio Vivó Undabarrena (Espinosa de los Monteros, 1930 – Olaberría, 6 February 1979) was a Spanish politician assassinated by the armed Basque separatist group ETA on February 6, 1979.

== Biography ==
José Antonio Vivó Undabarrena was the mayor of Olaberría, Deputy of Guipúzcoa and member of the political party named Guipúzcoa Unida. He was born in the locality of Burgos, from Espinosa de los Monteros. He was 49 years old, married and had six children at the time of the murder.

=== Assassination ===
On February 6, 1979, at 21:15 hours two hooded members of ETA touched the doorbell of Jose Antonio's house. It was the wife of Jose Antonio who opened the door to the hooded men. These men threatened her and two of the six children, and after plucking the cables from the phone to prevent any telephone communication. They took José Antonio by force. Moments later, his relatives heard several gunshots. Mercedes Galdós Arsuaga, a member of the Urola command, was the author of these shots. He was accompanied by Félix Ramón Gil Ostoaga, also a member of the same unit, who also shot José Antonio. After the gunshots, Jose Antonio fell with a deadly wound into a large puddle of blood. He was transferred by ambulance to San Miguel Clinic in Beasain, where his death was certified.

It was proved that his assassins robbed a vehicle by using a gun before committing the attack. The car was a white Seat 124. The owner of this vehicle was kidnapped and tied to a tree in Beasain, where he was abandoned. After the attack, the terrorists ran out and headed for the car, in which they fled in the direction of the road, National 1.

The members of the Urola command had monitored the victim for several months before the attack. The leadership of the group authorized this attack after receiving the data from the surveillance. At first, the authorities did not discard the intent of kidnap which ended in murder since the victim showed resistance.

Following this attack, the Justice condemned the members of ETA Mercedes Galdós Arsuaga and Félix Ramón Gil Ostoaga. Mercedes Galdós Arsuaga was arrested in 1986 during the police operation that dismantled Nafarroa's command. Two years later, on April 25, 1988, she was condemned to 29 years in prison under the sentence 20/88, dictated by section 2 of Criminal Chamber of the National Audience.

The gunman who participated with Mercedes in the attack shot the victim at the same time, Félix Ramón Gil Ostoaga. Félix Ramón Gil Ostoaga was detained in the French town of Ciboure on October 24, 1989. Sentenced to the same penalties on November 19, 1994, when section 2 of the Criminal Chamber of the National Audience condemned him under sentence 66/94. In the verdict 66/94, both defendants were sentenced to the solidarity payment as compensation to the heirs of José Antonio Vivó. It is imputed the participation of José María Zaldúa Corta in the assassination of Jose Antonio even though he was never condemned in Spain for his crime.

There was no claim made by ETA in the days after the attack.

== Bibliography ==
- MERINO, A., CHAPA, A., Roots of liberty. pp. 25–29. FPEV (2011). ISBN 978-84-615-0648-4
