= Pedro Álvarez Castelló =

Cuban artist (1967–2004)

Pedro Reinaldo Álvarez Castelló
- Born: February 9, 1967; Havana, Cuba
- Died: February 12, 2004 (aged 37); Tempe, Arizona
- Occupation: Painter

Pedro Reinaldo Álvarez Castelló (February 9, 1967 – February 12, 2004) was a Cuban artist who rose to prominence during Cuba's Special Period.

== Biography ==
Álvarez was a native of Havana, Cuba. He studied art at the Escuela Nacional de Bellas Artes “San Alejandro” from 1980 to 1985 and the Instituto Superior Pedagógico Enrique José Varona from 1986 to 1991. He was a member of the National Union of Writers and Artists of Cuba.

On February 12, 2004, Álvarez died just five days after the beginning of a major solo exhibition of his work, "Landscape in the Fireplace," at the Arizona State University Art Museum.

== Work ==
Álvarez's paintings are shown in museums around the world, including the Museo Nacional de Bellas Artes de La Habana in Havana, the Museo Andaluz de Arte Contemporáneo in Seville, Spain, the Arizona State University Art Museum in Tempe, Arizona, the Museum of Art in Ft. Lauderdale, Florida and the Museo de la Universidad de Alicante in Alicante, Spain. He produced more than eight personal exhibitions in Cuba and Spain and more than 40 collective exhibitions in Germany, Canada, Spain, England and the United States.

ASU Art Museum director Marilyn Zeitlin said Álvarez's work "addresses questions of importance not only for Cubans and those interested in that work and place, but issues of perennial and global concern including colonialism and ways in which we perpetuate colonialism without even being aware of it."

Much of his work utilized a juxtaposition of pop culture references, such as clippings from The Simpsons comic books, against traditional Cuban images, such as 19th century peasants and troubadours. Describing his creative process, Álvarez said, "The iconography in my paintings is a collage of found images. Clips from art catalogues, magazines, books, old postcards, bank notes are intuitively collected and stocked for some time until they are used, in a more or less fragmentary way, as backgrounds, characters or plain referents. It is a process very close to the one described in Freud's studies on jokes. I have to be "half way through" those clips and into the realm of ideas, concerns and intuitions. From that tension, the new ideas are born. The execution phase has its own rhythm and tensions, but in a general sense, the majority of the important decisions has already been taken before painting starts."

Among his personal exhibitions were "Exposición de Paisajes", Galería de Arte Universal, Trinidad, Sancti Spíritus, Cuba (1985), and "Spanish Paintings and Nuevo Arte Suizo. Pedro Álvarez_Ezequiel Suárez", Espacio Aglutinador, Havana. He also took part in many group exhibitions, including "Arte Cubano en Boston", Massachusetts College of Art (1988); "Misa por una Mueca". VIII Bienal Internacional de Humorismo, Centro de Desarrollo de las Artes Visuales, Havana (1993); the Internationale Grafick Biennale, Maastricht Exhibition and Congress Center, Maastricht; the II" Bienal de Pintura del Caribe y Centro América", Museo de Arte Moderno, Santo Domingo, Dominican Republic (1994).

== Related artists ==
=== Influences ===
- Diego Velázquez
- Mark Tansey
- Ed Rucha
- Victor Patricio Landaluze
- Sandro Chia

=== Peers ===
- Antonio Eligio Fernandez
- Saidel Brito
- Sandra Ramos
- Kcho
- Carlos Estévez
- Belkis Ayón
- Luís Gómez
- René Francisco
- Abel Barroso
- Fernando Rodríguez
- Osvaldo Yero
- Asterio Segura
- Jose Angel Toirac
