= Pedro J. J. Alvarez =

American academic

Pedro J.J. Alvarez
- Education: McGill University (BE); University of Michigan (MS, PhD)
- Awards: Athalie Richardson Irvine Clarke Prize {2012)

Pedro J.J. Alvarez is the George R. Brown Professor of Civil and Environmental Engineering at Rice University, Houston, United States, where he also serves as founding Director of the National Science Foundation Engineering Research Center on Nanotechnology-Enabled Water Treatment (NEWT) and as Director of the Rice WaTER Institute.

Alvarez also serves on the board of directors of the Houston Endowment Inc., which is a private foundation to improve quality of life for the residents of greater Houston. His research interests include environmental implications and applications of nanotechnology, bioremediation, fate and transport of toxic chemicals, water footprint of biofuels, water treatment and reuse, and antibiotic resistance control. Professor Alvarez received the B. Eng. Degree in Civil Engineering from McGill University and MS and Ph.D. degrees in Environmental Engineering from the University of Michigan. He is the 2012 Athalie Richardson Irvine Clarke Prize laureate for outstanding research in water science and technology, and also won the AAEES Grand Prize for Excellence in Environmental Engineering and Science.

== Career ==
Alvarez has served on the EPA’s Science Advisory Board and the National Science Foundation Engineering Directorate Advisory Committee, and is an Executive Editor of Environmental Science and Technology.

Alvarez is an honorary professor at Nankai University, Zheijang University, and Chinese Academy of Sciences, and adjunct professor at the Universidade Federal de Santa Catarina in Florianopolis, Brazil.

== Award and honors ==
- 2026 Awarded Benjamin Franklin Medal in Civil Engineering
- 2024 Elected to the American Academy of Arts and Sciences
- 2023 Outstanding Achievement Award, China Chemical Society
- 2023 Thompson Reuter’s Highly Cited Researcher (consequently, since 2014)
- 2022 Distinguished Fellow of IETI (International Engineering and Technology Institute)
- 2022 Elected to Chinese Academy of Engineering, International Member
- 2022 ACS Southwest Regional Partners in Progress & Prosperity (P3) Award (with M. Reynolds & M. Wong)
- 2021 ASCE Simon Freese Award
- 2021 NSF Engineering 40th Anniversary Distinguished Lecture
- 2020 ES Nano best papers: DOI: 10.1039/C9EN00143C and DOI: 10.1039/C9EN00827F
- 2020 ES&T best feature article: DOI: 10.1021/acs.est.8b05041
- 2020 Advisory Professor, Shanghai Jiao Tong University
- 2019-now Board of Directors, Houston Endowment Inc.
- 2019 William Mong distinguished lecture, Faculty of Engineering, The University of Hong Kong
- 2018 Inducted into the National Academy of Engineering
- 2018 Perry McCarty AEESP Founders’ Award for Outstanding Contributions to Env. Eng. Education & Practice
- 2018 Brown and Caldwell Lifetime Achievement Award for Remediation
- 2017 Association of Environmental Engineering and Science Professors (AEESP) Distinguished Lecturer

== Best Papers ==
- 2014 Best paper awards
- 2014 Most downloaded paper in water research
- ES Nano Best Papers
- ES Nano Best Papers
- ES&T Best Feature Article
