= José María Álvarez de Sotomayor =

Spanish playwright and poet

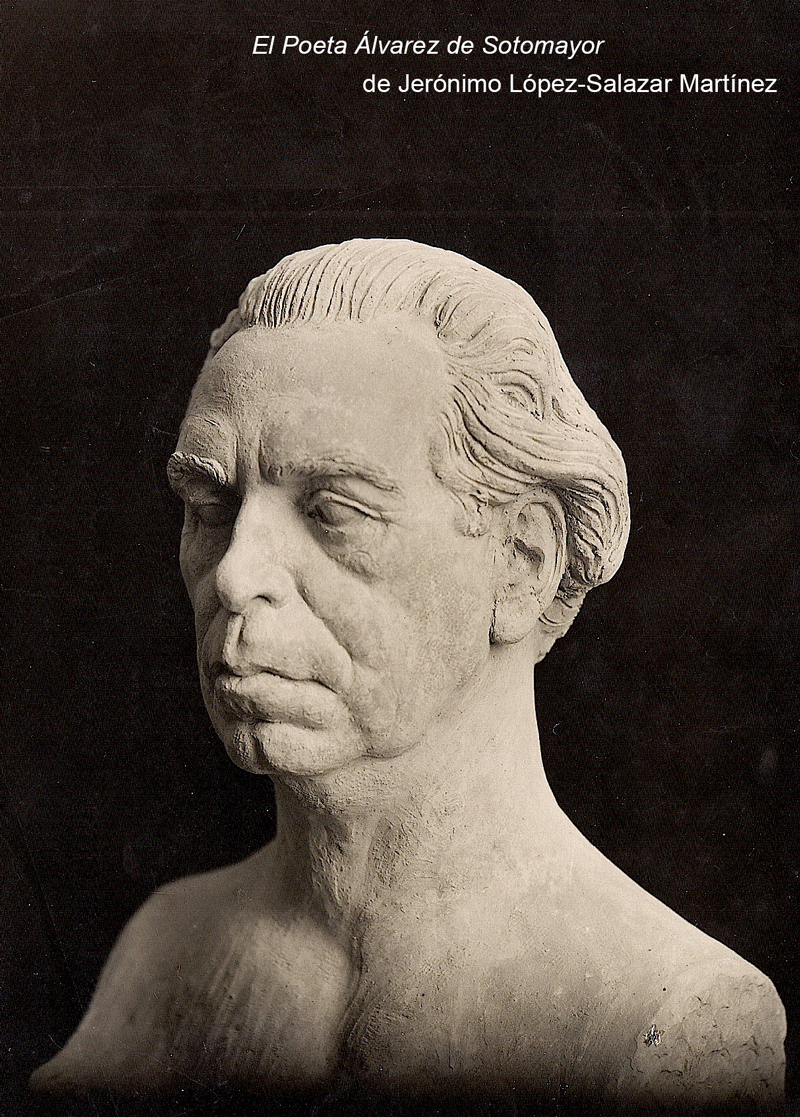
Bust of the poet Álvarez de Sotomayor by Jerónimo López-Salazar Martínez. 1933

José María Álvarez de Sotomayor (28 September 1880–20 May 1947) was a Spanish playwright and poet from the Province of Almería.

== Sources ==
- Manuel Cáceres Sánchez, 1991: El Almeriense Álvarez de Sotomayor (1880-1947) y la Literatura Rural en España. Almería: Instituto de Estudios Almerienses
