= Gabriela Álvarez (engineer) =

Mexican mechanical engineer

Gabriela del Socorro Álvarez García (died 2017) was a Mexican mechanical engineer known for her research on solar energy and heat transfer in buildings and on the use of reflective roofs to reduce the need for air conditioning.

== Education and career ==
Álvarez was originally from Mexico City, and as an undergraduate studied physics at the National Autonomous University of Mexico (UNAM). After earning a master's degree in mechanical engineering from New Mexico State University in the US, she returned to UNAM for a doctoral study in engineering. She completed her doctorate in 1994 with the dissertation Transferencia de calor en una cavidad con interaccion termica a traves de una cara semitransparente con controlador optico.

In 1989, she became a professor and researcher in the department of mechanical engineering at the Centro Nacional de Investigación y Desarrollo Tecnológico (CENIDET, the National Center for Research and Technological Development), in Cuernavaca. In 2014, CENIDET became part of the National Technological Institute of Mexico system.

She also served internationally in the American Society of Heating, Refrigerating and Air-Conditioning Engineers Technical Committee 4.5 on fenestration, the first Mexican to do so.

Álvarez received a national award for innovation in renewable energy from the Mexican Ministry of Energy. She was a member of the Mexican Academy of Sciences.

== Selected publications ==
- Alvarez, G.; Arce, J.; Lira, L.; Heras, M.R. (2004), "Thermal performance of an air solar collector with an absorber plate made of recyclable aluminum cans", Solar Energy, 77 (1): 107–113, Bibcode:2004SoEn...77..107A, doi:10.1016/j.solener.2004.02.007
- Xamán, J.; Álvarez, G.; Lira, L.; Estrada, C. (July 2005), "Numerical study of heat transfer by laminar and turbulent natural convection in tall cavities of façade elements", Energy and Buildings, 37 (7): 787–794, Bibcode:2005EneBu..37..787X, doi:10.1016/j.enbuild.2004.11.001
- Hinojosa, J.F.; Cabanillas, R.E.; Alvarez, G.; Estrada, C.E. (October 2005), "Nusselt number for the natural convection and surface thermal radiation in a square tilted open cavity", International Communications in Heat and Mass Transfer, 32 (9): 1184–1192, Bibcode:2005ICHMT..32.1184H, doi:10.1016/j.icheatmasstransfer.2005.05.007
- Arce, J.; Jiménez, M.J.; Guzmán, J.D.; Heras, M.R.; Alvarez, G.; Xamán, J. (December 2009), "Experimental study for natural ventilation on a solar chimney", Renewable Energy, 34 (12): 2928–2934, Bibcode:2009REne...34.2928A, doi:10.1016/j.renene.2009.04.026
- Hernández-Pérez, I.; Álvarez, G.; Xamán, J.; Zavala-Guillén, I.; Arce, J.; Simá, E. (September 2014), "Thermal performance of reflective materials applied to exterior building components—A review", Energy and Buildings, 80: 81–105, Bibcode:2014EneBu..80...81H, doi:10.1016/j.enbuild.2014.05.008

== Recognition ==
Álvarez was given a national prize for renewable energy innovation by the Mexican Secretary of Energy. She was a member of the Mexican Academy of Sciences.
