= José Antonio Álvarez Sánchez =

Spanish Roman Catholic bishop (1975–2025)

His Excellency José Antonio Álvarez Sánchez
- Auxiliary Bishop of Madrid
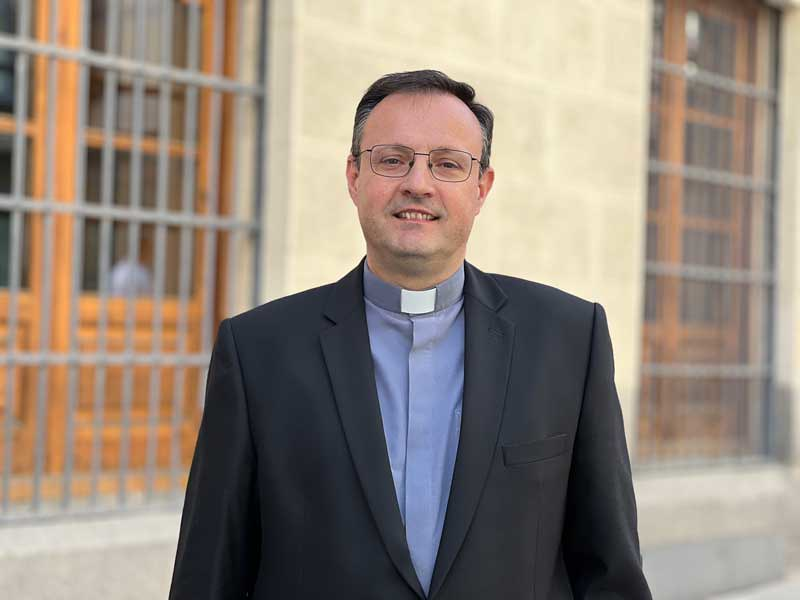
- Álvarez in 2024
- Archdiocese: Madrid
- Appointed: 23 April 2024
- Term ended: 1 October 2025
- Other post: Titular Bishop of Vergi (2024–2025)

Orders
- Ordination: 18 June 2000
- Consecration: 6 July 2024 by José Cobo Cano, José Rodríguez Carballo and Jesús Vidal Chamorro

Personal details
- Born: 3 August 1975 Madrid, Spain
- Died: 1 October 2025 (aged 50) Madrid, Spain
- Motto: Sequere me
- Coat of arms

Styles of José Antonio Álvarez Sánchez
- Reference style: His Excellency; The Most Reverend
- Spoken style: Your Excellency
- Religious style: Bishop

José Antonio Álvarez Sánchez (Note: In this Spanish name, the first or paternal surname is Álvarez and the second or maternal family name is Sánchez.) (3 August 1975 – 1 October 2025) was a Spanish Roman Catholic bishop.

== Biography ==
Álvarez Sánchez was born in Madrid on 3 August 1975. In 1998, after studying at the San Dámaso Ecclesiastical University, he obtained a bachelor's degree in theology. Later, he obtained a master's degree in vocational discernment and spiritual accompaniment from the San Ignacio Spirituality Center of the Comillas Pontifical University (2008–2011), where he also studied a degree in spirituality.

He was ordained a deacon on 28 November 1999, and a priest on 18 July 2000, incardinated in the archdiocese of Madrid.

On 23 April 2024, Pope Francis appointed him auxiliary bishop of Madrid, together with Vicente Martín Muñoz. He also appointed him titular bishop of Berja. He was consecrated on 6 July of the same year, in the Cathedral of the Almudena; at the hands of Cardinal-Archbishop José Cobo Cano.

In August 2024, he was appointed vice-grand chancellor of the San Damaso Ecclesiastical University. In February 2025, he was appointed vicar general of the archdiocese.

In the Spanish Episcopal Conference he was a member of the Episcopal Commission for the Laity, Family and Life (2024–2025).

Álvarez Sánchez died on 1 October 2025, at the age of 50, from a heart attack.

== Notes ==
Catholic Church titles
Preceded by —	Auxiliary Bishop of Madrid; 2024–2025	Succeeded by —
Preceded by Francisco José Prieto Fernández	Titular Bishop of Vergi; 2024–2025	Succeeded by Vacant
