= José Antonio Álvarez Álvarez =

Spanish economist, banker

José Antonio Álvarez
- Born: 1960 (age 65–66)
- Occupation: Banker
- Title: Vice Chairman and CEO, Santander Group
- Term: January 2015-
- Predecessor: Javier Marín Romano

José Antonio Álvarez Álvarez (born 1960) is vice chairman and CEO of Santander Group, the Spanish banking group centred on Banco Santander, the largest bank in the Eurozone by market value.

Álvarez has been CEO of Santander Group since January 2015 and an executive vice chairman since January 2019.

== CEO of Banco Santander ==
He was appointed CEO at the group's council meeting in November 2014, replacing Javier Marín Romano.
