= Civitella =

Civitella, a diminutive of Civita ("city"), is the name of over a dozen towns in Italy:

== Comuni ==
- Civitella Alfedena, in the province of L'Aquila
- Civitella Casanova, in the province of Pescara
- Civitella d'Agliano, in the province of Viterbo
- Civitella del Tronto, in the province of Teramo
- Civitella di Romagna, in the province of Forlì-Cesena
- Civitella in Val di Chiana, in the province of Arezzo
- Civitella Messer Raimondo, in the province of Chieti
- Civitella Paganico, in the province of Grosseto
- Civitella Roveto, in the province of L'Aquila
- Civitella San Paolo, in the province of Rome

== Frazioni ==
- Civitella Benazzone, of Perugia in the province of Perugia
- Civitella Cesi, of Blera in the province of Viterbo
- Civitella del Lago, of Baschi in the province of Terni
- Civitella Licinio, of Cusano Mutri in the province of Benevento
- Civitella Marittima, of Civitella Paganico in the province of Grosseto

Localities

- Civitella (Casacalenda), a locality or frazione in the comune of Casacalenda in the province of Campobasso
- Civitella (Larino), a locality or frazione in the comune of Larino in the province of Campobasso
- Civitella (Marzano Appio), a locality or frazione in the comune of Marzano Appio in the province of Caserta
- Civitella (Pescorocchiano), a locality or frazione in the comune of Pescorocchiano in the province of Rieti
- Civitella (Serravalle di Chienti), a locality or frazione in the comune of Serravalle di Chienti in the province of Macerata
- Civitella (Vastogirardi), a locality or frazione in the comune of Vastogirardi in the province of Isernia
- Civitella (Scheggino), a locality or frazione in the comune of Scheggino in the province of Perugia
- Civitella (Sellano), a locality or frazione in the comune of Sellano in the province of Perugia
- Civitella d'Arna, a locality or frazione in the comune of Perugia in the province of Perugia
- Civitella de' Conti, a locality in the comune of the San Venanzo in the province of Terni
- Civitella di Licenza, a locality or frazione in the comune of Licenza in the province of Rome
- Civitella Ranieri, a locality or frazione in the comune of Umbertide in the province of Perugia

== See also ==
- Civita (disambiguation)
