= Alonso de Salazar Frías =

Spanish inquisitor

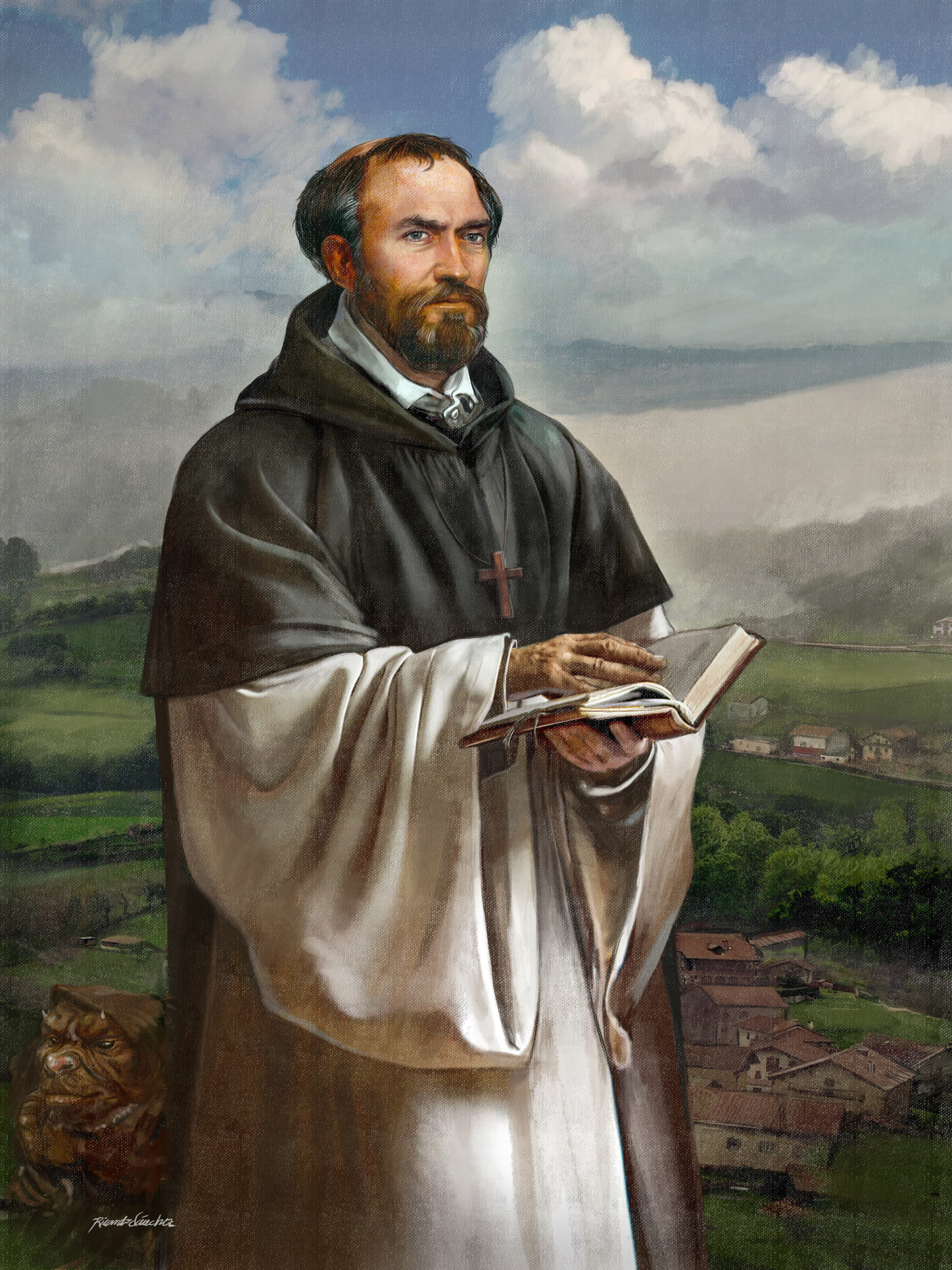
Alonso de Salazar y Frías

Alonso de Salazar Frías has been given the epithet "The Witches’ Advocate" by historians, for his role in establishing the conviction, within the Spanish Inquisition, that accusations against supposed witches were more often rooted in dreams and fantasy than in reality, and the inquisitorial policy that witch accusations and confessions should only be given credence where there was firm, independent, corroborating evidence. He was probably the most influential figure in ensuring that those accused of witchcraft were generally not put to death in seventeenth- and eighteenth-century Spain. The Spanish Inquisition was one of the first institutions in Europe to rule against the death penalty for supposed witches. Its Instructions of 1614, which embodied Salazar's ideas, were influential throughout Catholic Europe.

== Biography ==
Alonso de Salazar Frías (c. 1564–1636) was born in Burgos, where his father was a lawyer and belonged to an influential family of civil servants and prosperous merchants. Salazar studied for degrees in canon law at the University of Salamanca and at the University of Sigüenza. He took holy orders and was appointed as a vicar-general and judge at the court of the bishop of Jaén. His career owed a great deal to his close relationship with Bernardo de Sandoval y Rojas, Bishop of Jaén, and subsequently Archbishop of Toledo. Having gained a reputation as a successful lawyer, Salazar was elected Attorney General of the Castilian Church in 1600. When his patron became Inquisitor General in 1608, Salazar was selected as an inquisitor for a vacant post at Logroño (La Rioja) in 1609. His intelligent and single-minded approach to the witch trials conducted by this tribunal created great respect for him within the Inquisition. He became a member of its Supreme Council in 1631.

== Witch Trials in Navarre ==
When Salazar joined the tribunal of Logroño as its third inquisitor in June 1609, preliminary hearings were already under way in what was to prove the biggest series of witch trials in Spanish history, eventually involving 1384 supposed child witches and 420 supposed adult witches. This was a witch persecution unmatched in scale, before or after, in Spain. The accused in these trials came almost exclusively from Zugarramurdi and Urdax, two Basque villages within the region of Spanish Navarre, on the northern side of the Pyrenees, near the French border.

The investigation began when Maria de Ximildegui, of Zugarramurdi, claimed that she had attended witches' Sabbaths (nocturnal gatherings), and named other members of the village as present. She confronted one of the women she accused, Maria de Jureteguia, in front of the woman's family, and recounted the details so vividly that the listeners became convinced and pressured the woman to confess. She admitted it was true and said she had been a witch since she was a small child. After her priest urged her to make a public confession, during the next few days various others who had been denounced came forward and made public confessions. Some of those under suspicion were dragged to the local priest by force and threatened with torture if they did not confess.

In January 1609, four self-denounced witches were taken to Logroño for an initial hearing before the Inquisition. Not until the preliminary inquiries were completed did the inquisitors inform the Inquisitor General and the Supreme Council in Madrid. The two inquisitors in Logroño, Alonso Becerra Holguin and Juan del Valle Alvarado, assumed the existence of a witch sect was a fact, largely because the witches' descriptions were in such close agreement. Their descriptions of the devil, nocturnal assemblies and admissions ceremonies tallied, with very few discrepancies between accounts.

In March 1609, the Supreme Council of the Inquisition sent a questionnaire to Logroño to administer to imprisoned witches, witches still at liberty, and certain witnesses. Several of the questions aimed to establish whether the experiences of the supposed witches were dreams or reality, indicating the sceptical attitude of the council. The inquisitors only applied the questionnaire to imprisoned witches. From the answers, it was clear to them that the witches' gatherings were not based on dreams or imagination but were real.

A subsequent visitation by inquisitor Valle Alvarado concluded that about 300 adults were incriminated in witchcraft, of whom thirty-one of the most guilty were taken to Logroño for trial in June 1610. The inquisitors, by now including Salazar, were unanimous that those nineteen who confessed their crime should be punished but saved from the stake, except for one who was condemned to burn for being a proselytizer for the witch sect. But they disagreed over the fate of those twelve who denied the offence. Whereas the other inquisitors considered it a foregone conclusion that they should be sent to the stake, Salazar was not convinced of their guilt and voted for their interrogation under torture in order to provide more proof. In the event, the majority judgment prevailed, and those who denied their guilt were burned either alive or dead (for those who died while in prison). At this stage, Salazar's doubts remained known only to his fellow inquisitors.

These events occurred simultaneously with the witch-hunt conducted by French judge Pierre de Lancre in the Pays de Labourd, north of the Pyrenees. De Lancre's investigation led to mass burning of accused witches, who numbered over 80, according to Salazar (this figure is now recognised as the probable maximum, and much closer to the truth than the formerly accepted figure of 600, which arose out of a misunderstanding of what de Lancre himself wrote). There is little doubt that news of de Lancre's activities fuelled a witch panic on the Spanish side of the border. The public auto de fe at Logroño in 1610, attended by perhaps as many as 30,000 people, whipped up further anxiety about witchcraft in 1610–11 and produced a flock of accusations and confessions. In the whole area of northern Spanish Navarre, it seemed that there was hardly a town without bewitched children who were taken to witches’ nocturnal gatherings and who named all those they had seen there.

However, important sceptics believed that the accused in the Logroño trials had made false statements under torture or threats. This conviction was shared by local priests, Jesuit preachers and even the Bishop of Pamplona, Venegas de Figueroa, who informed the Inquisitor General that the witch craze consisted of rumours spread by children and simple folk who had heard about the witches in France. Faced with so many new unsubstantiated accusations and confessions, Salazar refused to support the other inquisitors, and a divided vote was forwarded to the Supreme Council.

In March 1611, the Inquisitor General instructed Salazar to make a new visitation, this time alone, unaccompanied by the other inquisitors. He was not to use pressure to force confessions, nor to question witches about supposed accomplices, but he was to interrogate witches who allegedly attended the same gathering to see if their statements tallied. Salazar's visitation began in May 1611 and lasted almost eight months. He was struck by the defendants’ uncertainty and inconsistency, and their frequent retraction of statements they had previously made about others. He rejected out of hand the statements of 1384 children, aged between six and fourteen years, which were full of defects. He concentrated upon obtaining material proofs of the existence of the supposed witch sect. When the accused were taken to the supposed place of the gathering and interrogated in detail about where the devil sat, they contradicted each other and their own earlier statements. Supposed ointments and powders proved to be fake materials, which the accused admitted contained harmless substances that they had cooked up in order to satisfy their persecutors and to substantiate confessions. Children who said they had been to gatherings in the village of Santesteban had lied, since Salazar's secretaries had been to the place on the night in question and had seen no one. In fact, the supposed witches had never been seen by anyone. Salazar concluded that the devil deludes those who think they have been to his gathering, with the intention of creating uproar and unjustly incriminating the innocent. The supposed witch sect was a product of the imagination. In a report to the Inquisitor General, Salazar wrote:

I have not found one single proof nor even the slightest indication from which to infer that one act of witchcraft has actually taken place…the testimony of accomplices alone without further support from external facts substantiated by persons who are not witches is insufficient to warrant even one arrest.

In a subsequent report to the Supreme Council in 1613, Salazar severely criticized the procedure of the tribunal during the witchcraft outbreak, not even disclaiming his own responsibility. The inquisitors had failed to keep proper records, writing only the resolution of each point, and thus suppressing inconsistencies; they had concealed the fact that the accused were permitted to retract confessions; those retractions which had occurred were sometimes omitted from the records, in the hope they would be withdrawn. The inquisitors had also tacitly accepted violence used against the accused by local authorities. The real question, Salazar said, was whether one should believe witchcraft occurred simply because of what accused witches claim. In his view, they were not to be believed, since they alleged impossible things such as flying through the air, attendance at the witches’ gathering at the same time that they were in bed, and self-transformation into different shapes.

"These claims go beyond all human reason and many even pass the limits permitted the devil", he concluded. "If the devil was involved, how could he allow his machinations to be exposed so easily by children of eight years and under?"

In 1614, the Supreme Council issued instructions that adopted almost all of Salazar's suggestions, and even reproduced some of his clauses word for word. This included the emphasis on establishing whether witches’ gatherings had taken place; the requirement that witches’ entire statements be recorded with all the contradictions and consideration of motives, and if the accused had been exposed to violence or coercion; insistence on proof from outside witnesses and acceptance of revocation of statements; the stipulation that no person should be sentenced solely on the basis of witches’ denunciations; and insistence that public discussion of witchcraft should be forbidden.

After Salazar executed these instructions in Logroño, he was able to report to the Supreme Council in 1617 that a state of peace now existed in Navarre; the imposition of silence on the witch question had combated the craze.

== Impact of Salazar in Spain and Europe ==
Salazar consistently applied the inductive method and insisted on empiricism. He advanced rational explanations for the witch panic in Navarre, including rumours of persecutions in France, preachers’ sermons, the spectacular auto de fe at Logroño, witnessed by 30,000 people, and a dream epidemic.

The Instructions of 1614 were not entirely original, since in many respects they restated guidelines formulated by inquisitors who met in Granada in 1526 in order to determine how to react to witchcraft discovered in Navarre that year. The restated guidelines included forbidding arrest or conviction of a witch solely on the basis of another witch's confession. But the 1614 Instructions also added new directions regarding the taking and recording of confessions. Thus, Salazar's contribution was not to create scepticism where there was none, since other inquisitors shared his views, but rather to restate this scepticism so cogently and with such an overwhelming body of empirical evidence that it definitively carried the day within the Inquisition.

Salazar was able to mitigate the effects of large-scale witch persecutions elsewhere in Spain, and worked to ensure that, where possible, witch trials came under the jurisdiction of the Inquisition. In 1616, secular authorities, entirely independent of the Inquisition, proceeded against witches in North Vizcaya, but thanks to the intervention of Salazar, there were no mass burnings. The accused were absolved and their trials were transferred to the Inquisition, which suspended the cases. In Catalonia, secular authorities hanged more than 300 supposed witches in 1616–19 but the persecutions were halted by the Inquisition. In 1621, when eight supposed witches were burned in the province of Burgos, Salazar compiled a report subsequently, and the jurisdiction of the Inquisition in witch cases was reaffirmed. In a hunt in the 1620s at Cangas, the Inquisition intervened and ensured that the accused escaped with light sentences.

The Instructions of 1614 expressed a scepticism not shared by all inquisitors. Until well into the seventeenth century, many inquisitors considered that witches should be put to death. Largely owing to the centralized method of government of the Inquisition and the authority of its Supreme Council, it was possible to implement a minority decision and suspend witch burning several decades before most of the rest of Europe changed policy. But the new instructions did not abolish witch trials, they only suspended killings. In fact, witch trials in Spain increased in number during the seventeenth century, even if the punishments were light compared to those administered in central and northern Europe. There were witch trials in Spanish courts long after many other European courts. As late as 1791, the Inquisition in Barcelona conducted a case against a woman who confessed to a pact with the devil.

Salazar's influence extended even beyond Spain. The Roman Inquisition also developed a strong tradition of leniency in sentencing supposed witches and insisted on adherence to strict procedural rules in the conduct of witch trials. Its own guidelines on witch trials were drafted in the early 1620s, influenced by Salazar's Instructions, and were circulated widely in manuscript until 1655 when they were published. They established strict rules for examining accused witches, called for restraint in the administration of torture and recommended care in the evaluation of witches’ confessions. Both the Spanish and Italian Inquisitions were among the earliest to reject the reality of the myth of the witches’ gathering.

Historian Gustav Henningsen has argued Salazar's reports demonstrates that intelligent people of the past were able to analyze witchcraft with no less penetration than modern commentators.
