= Pedarra =

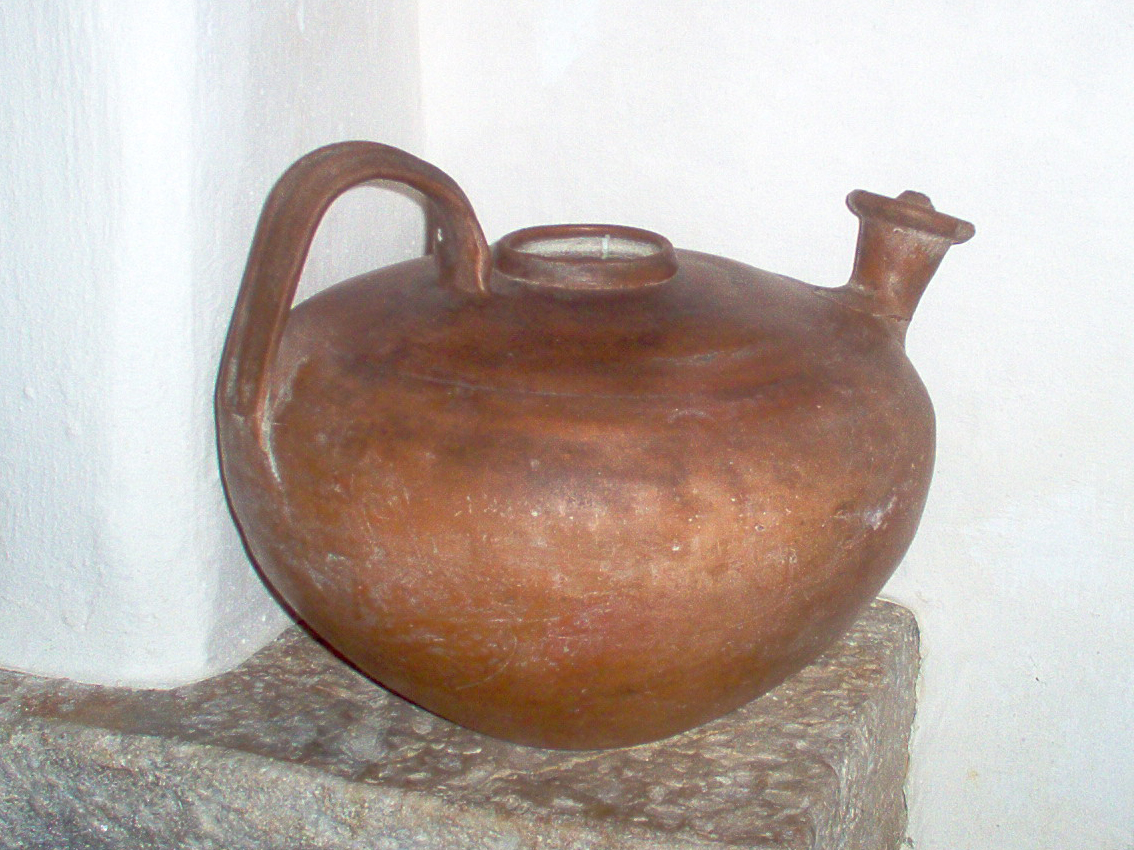
Pyrenean jug: kantarue, pedarra or pearra, péga, pegaro or hérado, pegas or pegarra, pedar, peas or pegar, durno in Gascon, cagnotte in Aquitanian, a jug with many names designed to be carried on the head.

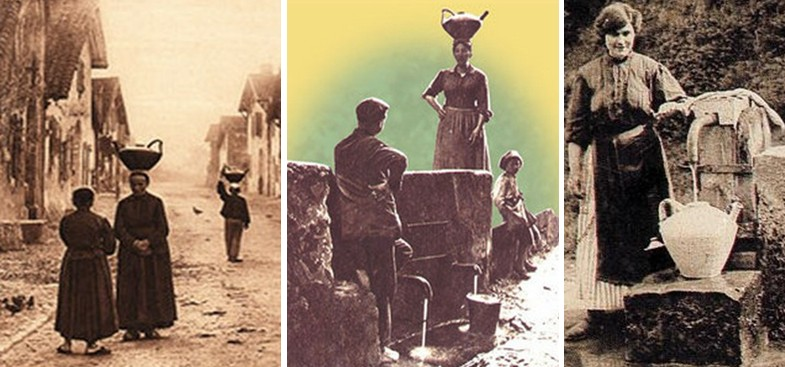

Pedarra, pegarra, Vizcayan jug or kantarue is a type of jug used in the Basque Country for carrying water. (Note: Ethnologists like Aranzadi or Caro Baroja report that in the Basque Country, the most commonly used container for transporting and storing water has been the herrada (suguilla, subilla or sulak), a wooden bucket with brass or copper hoops.) It is characterized by a shape different from any other jug in the Iberian Peninsula but similar to the French cruche.

In the Spanish and French Basque-Navarre region, its production has been traced in pottery workshops in the French Basque Country, Biarritz, St-Jean-le-Vieux, Amorebieta, Durango, Villarreal de Álava (Elosu, Ollerieta neighborhood), Sola and Santesteban.

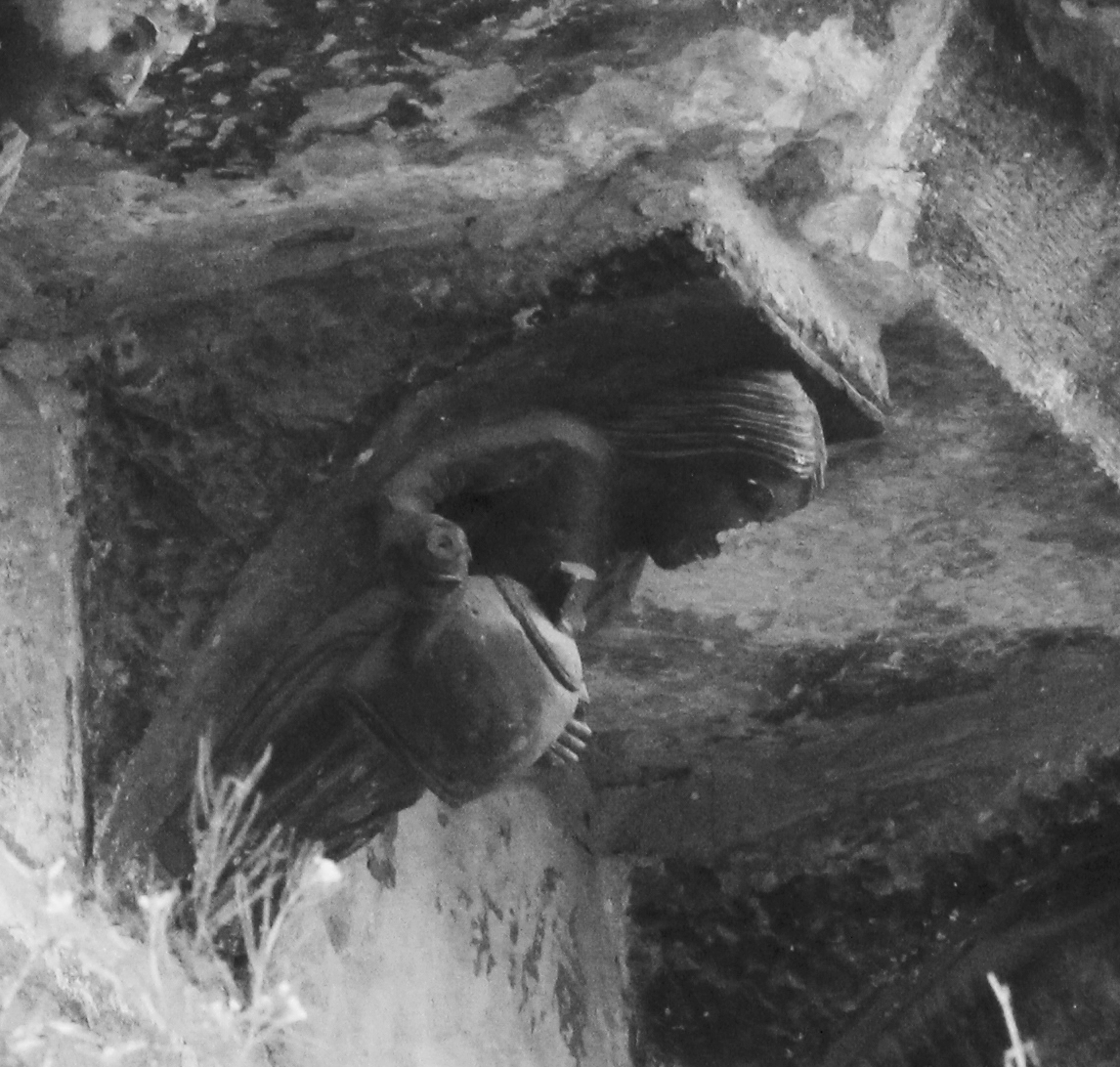
Modillion on the right side of the Church of Santa María Magdalena in Tudela with a figure holding a long-spouted vessel similar to the 'pedarra' and the Pyrenean Basque jug.

== Description ==
Vessel made of clay, flat, with a capacity of up to 15 L (3.3 imp gal; 4.0 US gal); about 8 cm (3.1 in) wide at the mouth, 16 cm (6.3 in) at the base, and about 25 cm (9.8 in) at the belly. Like many jugs, it has a lateral handle (gider), wide and slightly raised in the shape of a ribbon, and a long spout (tutu) on the opposite side.

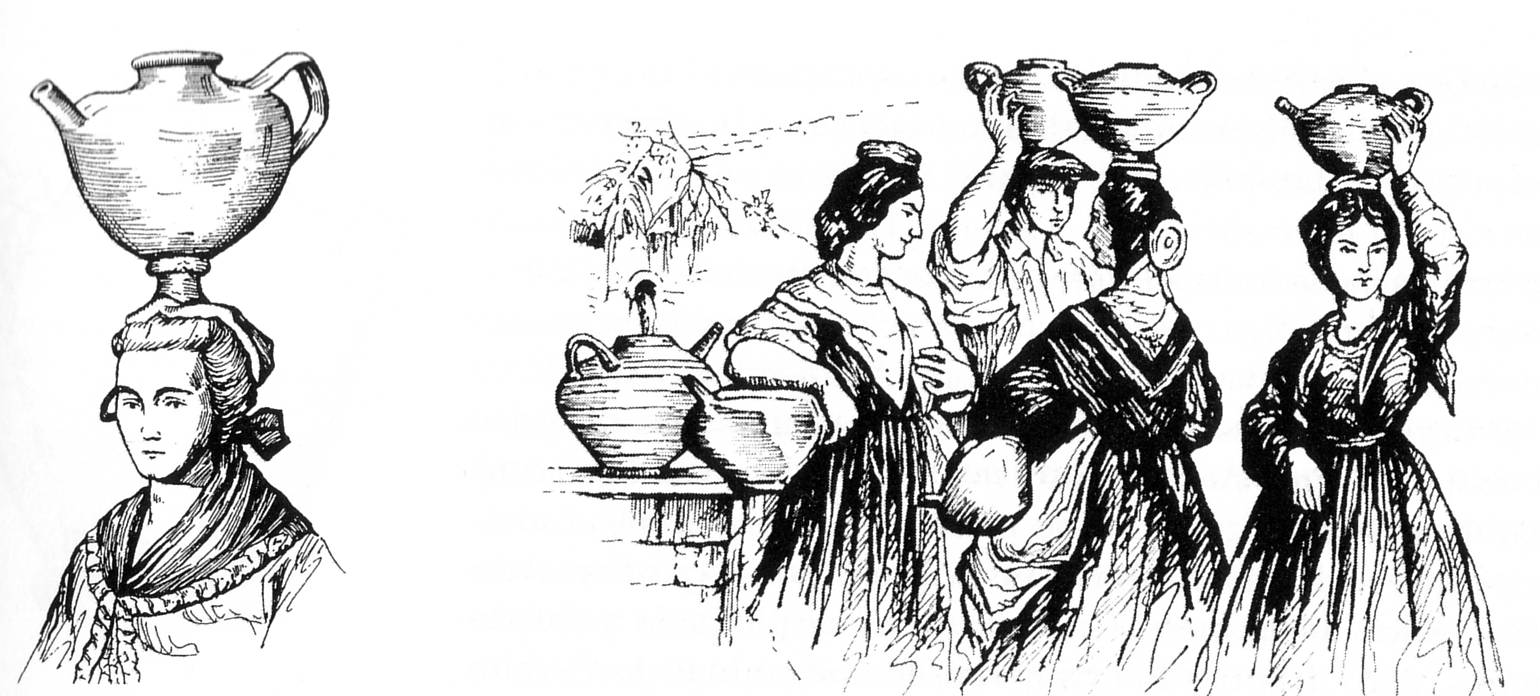

=== Designed for the head ===
The key to the morphological originality of the Vizcayan jug lies in the fact that it was designed to be carried on the head (a common practice not only in Spain but worldwide). The task is facilitated by the “buruti,” a cushion or cloth placed on the head to fit the jug.

== Terminology ==
The root of the Castilian word jug originated the term kantarue, common throughout Biscay. However, the rural Basque language and its neighboring Navarrese and Gascons have produced numerous dialectal endemisms:

- "Pedarra" in the upper course of the Bidasoa river: Santesteban and Vera de Bidasoa.
- "Pegas" in Biarritz.
- "Pedarra," "pegarra," or "pearra" in Sare, northern Navarre, the French Basque Country, and surrounding areas. (Note: As in the south of the Landes, according to the Atlas Lingüistique de la Gascogne by Jean Seguy. Further east, according to this atlas, it is called "durno.")
- In the Landes, further north of the area where the name "poega" appears, they call it "banoe."
- "Ourse" in the eastern French Basque Country. In Poyastruc and Lahitte-Toupière, important pottery centers where the vessels were not turned on a wheel but coiled. (Note: Roland Coquerel studied a jug slightly smaller than the "ourse," but classifiable within this family and called "péaderates," although with the handle on the mouth. It was made in Lahitte-Toupière, where the last firing of vessels took place in 1926 (Bulletin of the Société Ramond Bagnères de Bigorre, 1969).)
- In Gascony, in addition to "durno," it is known by the Gascon term "terras".
- Other collected terms are pedar, pear or pegar.

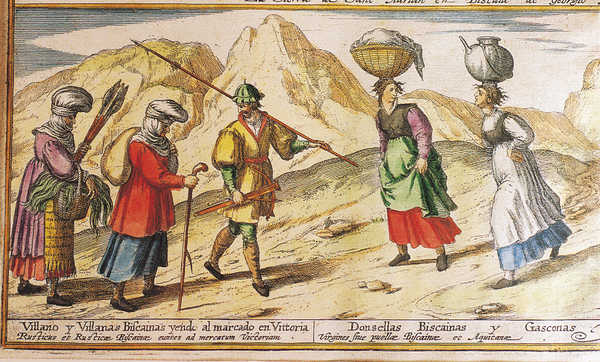
Engraving by Georgio Housnaglio in 1567 (Vizcayan types)

== Types ==
Depending on the production area, the pedarra appears as a piece of the popular white earthenware of the North or unglazed. Those from Biscay, Gipuzkoa, and areas of Álava were usually glazed inside and out with the traditional tin glaze, or with half exterior glazing (bib). When tin became scarce and its price soared, they began glazing them, allowing the clay's color to show through.

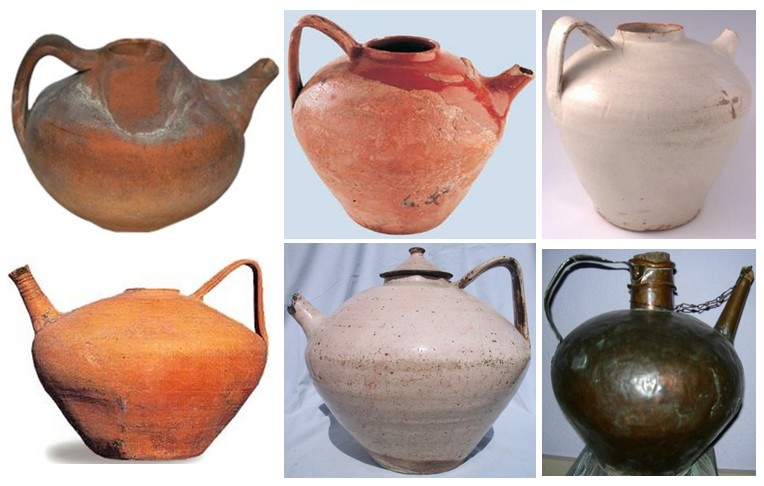
Five models of "pedarra" (Vizcayan jug) pottery, either unglazed or glazed in white tin glaze. And an Occitan "pegar" made of metal.

In the French Basque Country and the rest of the cited areas, the jugs were unglazed. There were decorated models in the valley of the Ariège and in Lahitte-Toupière (just a few strokes of slip).

== Jug races ==
In the chapter of Spanish folkloric traditions, the custom of holding jug races on the head during festivals has been recorded. This practice also exists in this geographical area, with photographic documentation from Amorebieta (Zornotza), in Ibarra and in Rentería. On the French side, Roland Coquerel records this custom in Pouyastruc.

== Bibliography ==
- Seseña, Natacha (1997). Cacharrería popular. La alfarería de basto en España. Madrid, Alianza Editorial. ISBN 84-206-4255-X.
- Caro Baroja, Julio. De la vida rural vasca. Txertoa. ISBN 84-7148-016-6.
- Pérez Vidal, José (1983). La cerámica popular española. Zona Norte. Cadernos de Olaria, Barcelos.
