= Civita =

Civita may refer to:

== Places ==
=== Italy ===
- Civita, Calabria, a comune in the Province of Cosenza, Calabria
- Civita Castellana, a comune in the Province of Viterbo, Lazio
- Civita d'Antino, a comune in the Province of L'Aquila, Abruzzo
- Civita di Bagnoregio, a frazione in the Province of Viterbo, Lazio
- Civita (Cascia), a frazione in the Province of Perugia, Umbria
- Olbia, known as Civita in Middle Ages, town in Sardinia
- Civitanova del Sannio, a comune in the Province of Isernia, Molise
- Civitanova Marche, a town and comune in the Province of Macerata, Marche
- Civitavecchia, a town and commune in the Province of Rome, Lazio
- Cividate Camuno, a commune in the province of Brescia, Lombardy

=== United States ===
- Civita, San Diego, a community in the Mission Valley area of the city of San Diego

== Other uses ==
- Civita (surname)
- Civita (think tank), a Norwegian liberal think tank

== See also ==
- Civitas (disambiguation)
- Civitella (disambiguation)
