= Civitas (disambiguation) =

Civitas is the condition of Roman citizenship.

Civitas may also refer to:

== Organisations ==
- CIVITAS (European Union), a European initiative to make urban transport more environmentally friendly
- Civitas Foundation for Civil Society, a Romanian non-governmental organisation which aims to stimulate local and regional development
- Civitas Institute, a conservative American think-tank
- Civitas (think tank), a British think-tank
- Civitas (movement), a French far-right Roman Catholic advocacy group (1999–2023)
- Civitas Independent, an indoor drumline based in Rock Hill, South Carolina

== Schools ==
- Collegium Civitas, a college in Poland
- Baltimore Civitas Middle/High School, a school in Fairmount, Baltimore City

== Creative works ==
- Civitas Londinum, the formal title of the 16th-century Woodcut map of London
- Sancta Civitas, a 20th-century oratorio by Ralph Vaughan Williams
- Civitas Dei, a book by St. Augustine

== Places ==
- Civitas Tungrorum, a Roman administrative district now in Belgium
- Civitas Tropaensium, a Roman castrum now in Romania
- Civitas Equestrium, the original name of Nyon, Switzerland
- Civitas Bernanensium, the original name of Lescar, France
- Civitas Schinesghe, a medieval Latin name for Poland
- Civitas Silvanectium, the Latin name from various communities named Senlis in France

== See also ==
- Civita (disambiguation)
