= Santesteban =

Santesteban is a surname of Basque origin. People with that name include:

- Ane Santesteban (born 1990), Spanish racing cyclist
- Jesús de Santesteban (1866 — after 1893), Basque pianist and composer, son of José Antonio
- Jose Agerre Santesteban (1889–1962), Basque writer and politician
- José Antonio Santesteban (1835–1906), Basque composer, song of José Juan, father of Jesús
- José Juan Santesteban (1809–1884), Basque composer, father of José Antonio

== See also ==
- Doneztebe-Santesteban, a town in Navarre, Spain
- Saint-Esteben
- Santisteban

Media related to Santesteban at Wikimedia Commons
