= Txanton Piperri =

First opera in Basque language

- Opera by Buenaventura Zapirain
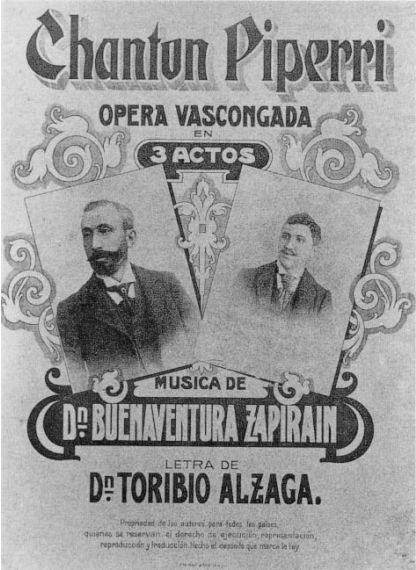
- Poster of Txanton Piperri (1899)
- Librettist: Toribio Alzaga
- Language: Basque
- Premiere: 6 May 1899; Catholic Centre (San Sebastián)

Txanton Piperri (sometimes written as Chanton Piperri) is an opera by Buenaventura Zapirain with libretto in basque by Toribio Alzaga, premiered on 6 January 1899 at the Catholic Centre in San Sebastián.

== History ==
Zapirain, a lekeitian, had settled San Sebastián in 1893, where he worked as a teacher and organist at the Marianist Brothers' College. By that time, the city had hosted the premiere of some operas with libretto in Basque (Pudente by José Antonio Santesteban in 1884 or Iparraguirre by Juan Guimón in 1889), but Txanton Piperri is generally considered to be "the first Basque opera". Unlike what had happened with previous operas, Txanton Piperri was born with the intention of being a work that would not be performed only in San Sebastián, but would be taken to other cities, spreading Basque culture in territories that, unlike San Sebastián, had suferred the loss of that culture (as in the case of Bilbao; the capital of Gipuzkoa had an educated Basque-speaking population, so that the Basque language was not seen as "uncultured" as it was in other Basque cities. Zapirain was the first non-Gipuzkoan composer to write in basque, and the work, far from being a simple entertainment for carnival festivities, as in previous cases, has the ambition of a great historical opera, taking international works as reference, especially the French Grand-Ópera. The plot of the play, although historical, has a contemporary application: its message of unity in the midst of the division between Oñacins and Gamboins in the Wars of the Bands is applicable to a society just emerging from the Carlist Wars, with explicit allusions to the motto "Jaungoikoa eta lege zarra" (God and old law), the motto of Sabino Arana, founder of the PNV.

Txanton Piperri had two partial premieres: on 28 February 1897 the first act was performed for the first time at the Teatro Circo in San Sebastián, while on 20 February 1898 the first act was performed again and the second act was premiered at the same theatre. The complete premiere of the three acts of the opera took place on 6 January 1899 at the Catholic Centre. On 12 April of the same year it was performed at the Teatro Principal, and a month later, on 25 May, it was premiered for the first time outside San Sebastián, at the Teatro Arriaga in Bilbao. The opera was performed in both cities and also in Vitoria-Gazteiz, as well as in some smaller towns in the Basque Country, in the following years, but from the mid-20th century onwards it gradually disappeared, being performed for the last time in 1984.

== Roles ==
Role	Voice Type	Premiere Cast, 6 May 1899
Txanton	tenor	Martínez, Ercilla
Lazkano	baritone	Florez, Irigoyen
Berastegi	bass	Eznaola, Arando
Maritxo	soprano	Garin
Lizarreta	tenor	Gadea
Balda	tenor	Zubiría
Loiola	baritone	Irigoyen, Florez

== Synopsis ==
Act I The Oñacins gather in front of the tower of their leader, Martín de Lazkano. A young orphan who has been raised by Lazkano, Txanton Piperri, presents them with a plan to attack the tower of Miguel de Lizarreta, the Gamboin leader, in order to obtain great booty. Lazkano supports the attack, but not his son Josetxo, who fears for his father's fate. Txanton finally stays with him, but when the other Oñacins have left, the Gamboins arrive, set fire to the tower and take Josetxo prisoner, while Txanton is badly wounded.

Act II After the attack, there was a battle between the two sides, in which the Oñacins won and managed to rescue Josetxo. Lazkano, after losing his castle, took refuge in the palace of Pedro de Berastegi, a nobleman who was opposed to fighting. Txanton arrives there after hiding in the forest, eager to meet his Lord again, but the latter accuses him of being a traitor, as a Gamboin claims that he is behind the attack. Berastegi meets with Txanton and is convinced of his innocence, but the Oñacinos do not accept him and throw him out of the castle.

Act III In the town square, the inhabitants celebrate the imminent peace. Berastegi arrives with the leaders of the Oñacins and Gamboins, but instead of signing the peace agreement, they engage in a fight. Josetxo then appears, informing them of the apparition of the Virgin of Arantzazu. The banderizos want to visit her, but Berastegi tells them that they cannot do so unless they sign the peace agreement first. After initial reluctance, they finally agreed. Lazkano is unwilling to forgive the betrayal of Txanton, who is present, but Lizarreta confirms his innocence, and the two are reconciled. The opera ends with a hymn to Euskal Herria.
