= Castello Baglioni =

Fortified palace in Civitella Messer Raimondo, Italy

Coordinates: 42.0883°N 14.2165°E

Baglioni Castle
- Castello Baglioni
- Civitella Messer Raimondo
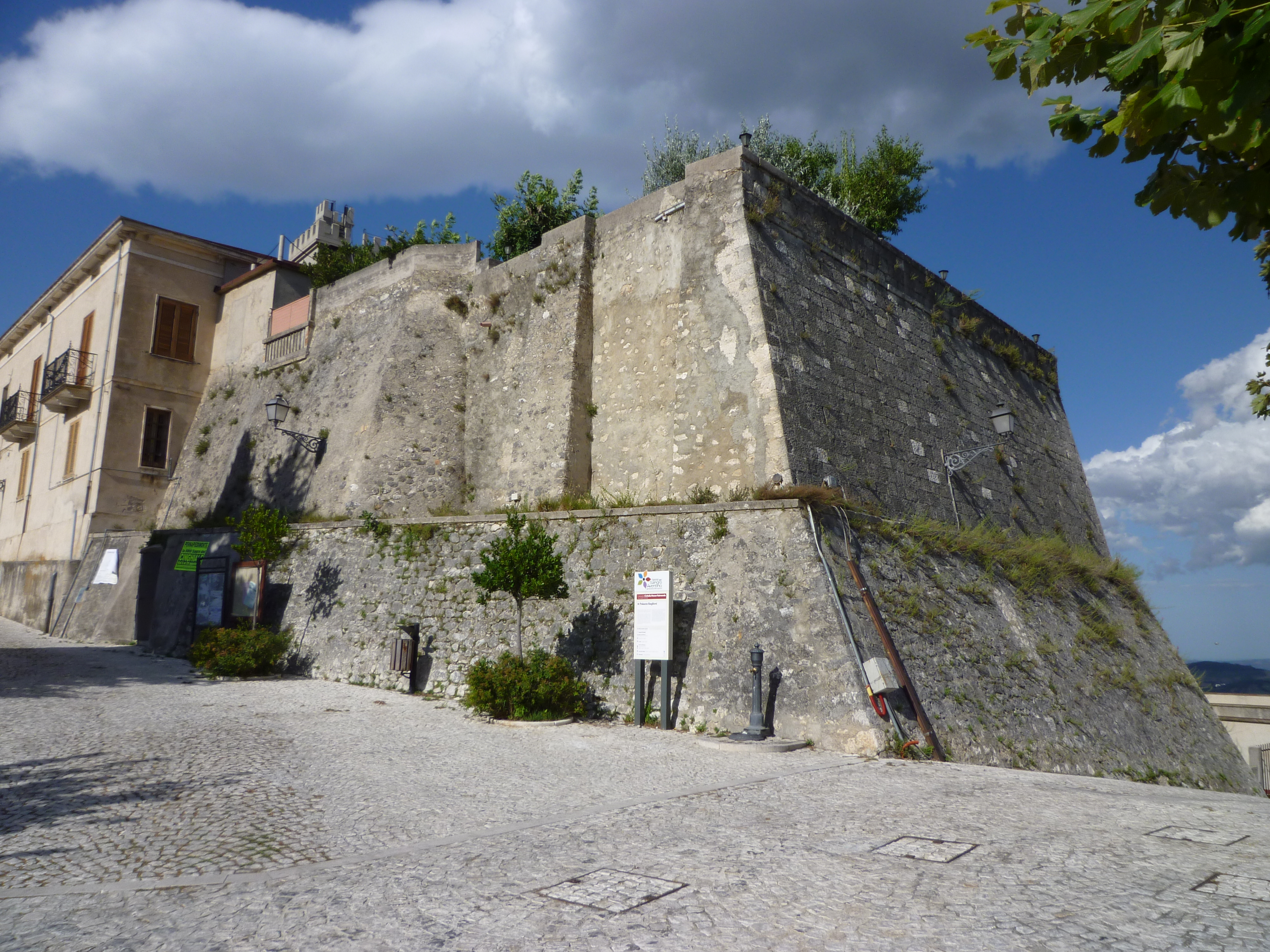
- Castle in Civitella Messer Raimondo

Site information
- Type: Castle

Location

Site history
- Built: 18th century

Castello Baglioni (Italian for Baglioni Castle) is a fortified palace in Civitella Messer Raimondo, Province of Chieti (Abruzzo).

== History ==
Despite numerous modifications and the lack of documents concerning the castle's foundation, it appears to have been established in the 18th century when the Baglioni family settled in Civitella Messer Raimondo.

== Architecture ==
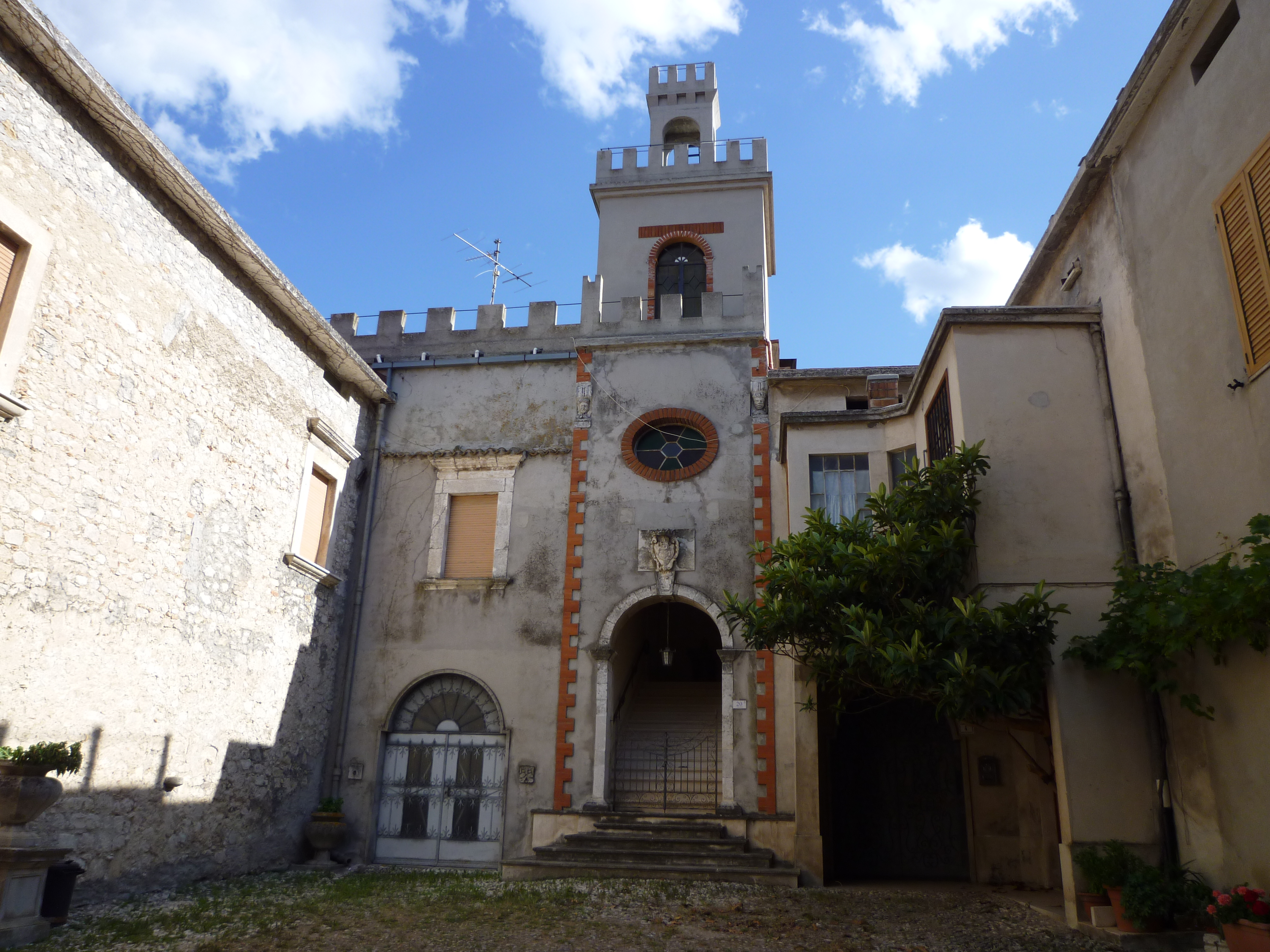
Turret in the inner courtyard

The castle has a quadrangular plan, while the courtyard is almost rectangular in shape. A bastion is located on the eastern side. The structure consists of two levels. The façade features stone quoins and is organized into seven axes. The entrance block projects slightly from the rest of the façade. The tower on the façade is made of brick with stone corbels, while the rest of the bastion is in stone. The portal is crafted from stone sourced from the Majella. Above the portal is a balcony supported by corbels. Through the entrance hall and a barrel vault with frescoes, one reaches the courtyard of the palace, where, parallel to the façade, another tower (perhaps a watchtower) stands.
