= Joana Civita =

Accused witch in Catalonia

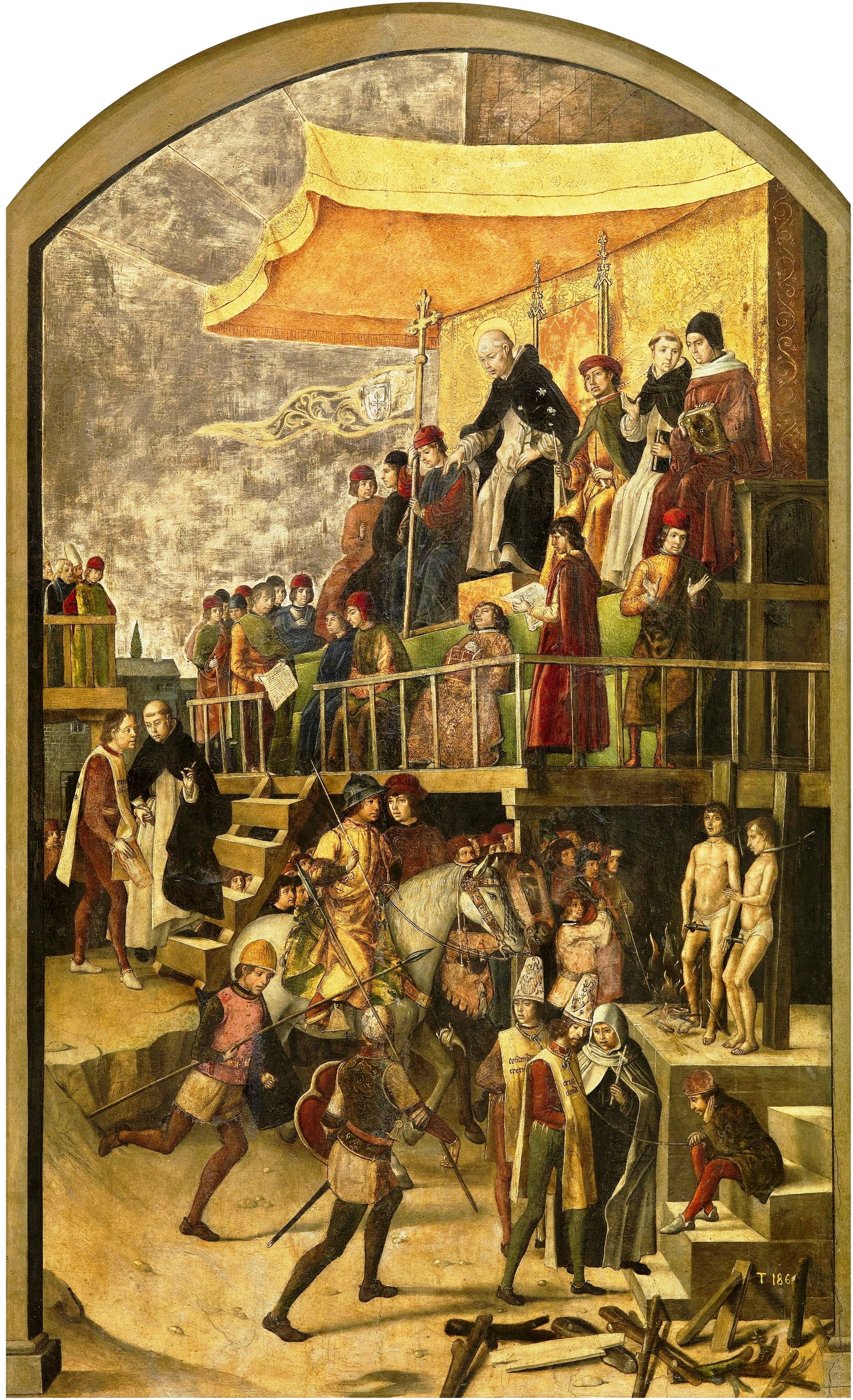
image of an auto-da-fé

Joana Civita, was an accused witch, in Catalonia, Spain during the witch hunts of 1618-1619. Her trial was part of a wave of persecutions across Spain that followed the famous Basque witch trials of 1609-1614, which ended with the Logroño auto-da-fé, of 1610, where six witches were killed and five others burned in effigy, and was the final process of an Inquisition by the Catholic church.

Civita was described as a 30year old woman at her trial in Terrassa in 1615, and was unusually tried several times, including by the Inquisition of Barcelona, who dismissed her case after four years.

These trials are also known as the witch trials of Zugarramundi where between 2000 and 7000 people were accused and examined. The town now has a museum of witchcraft. The chief Inquisatorial judge Alonso de Salazar y Frias recognised the hysteria that possibly arises from accused witches naming others and that statements or confessions drawn under torture could be false due to the desire to be released. These procedural changes were embedded in Spanish law but took many years to spread across Europe.
