= Jesús de Santesteban =

Basque pianist and composer

Jesús de Santesteban (5 November 1866 — ??) was a Basque pianist and composer, son of José Antonio Santesteban, grandson of José Juan Santesteban.

He studied at Conservatoire de Paris. In 1893 he became Officier d'Académie. Composed different salon pieces.
