= Civitas Foundation for Civil Society =

Romanian non-governmental organisation

Civitas Foundation for Civil Society is an NGO in Romania which aims to stimulate local and regional development.

== History ==
Photo of Civitas staff

Civitas Foundation was founded in October 1992. The main reasons for its founding were the need to enhance the local government capacity and to stimulate the citizen's involvement in decision making and local governance. The foundation carries on activities in Transylvania, but carries on projects on national and international level (South East Europe) too.

== Programs and projects ==
The programs and projects carried on by the foundation can be classified in four major domains which are in concordance with the strategically principles.

- Rural development:
  - Local development officer
  - Integrated local development
- Human resources development:
  - SEDAP
  - Continuous adult training
  - Elaboration of occupational standard : Programs director
- Civil society development:
  - Citizens participation
  - Advice and information:
    - Citizens Advice Bureau (BCC Odorheiu Secuiesc)
    - Basic knowledge for the NGO sector
    - How to access ESF funds
  - Social partnership:
    - Interethnic Magazine
- Developing local public administration capacity:
  - SEDAP
  - Efficient local public administration
  - Local policies and EU integration
  - Local budget policies

== Services ==
The services provided by the foundation are structured in three categories:

- Administration of a resource center to sustain the local and regional development
- Training is offered in the following areas:
  - Public management (operational and strategic management),
  - Human resources management,
  - Institutional communication,
  - Project management,
  - Local and regional development,
  - Financial management in local public administration.
- Consulting is offered in the following fields:
  - Elaboration of local and regional development strategies,
  - Elaboration of projects proposed for financing,
  - Human resources management, staff policies,
  - Financial management and local finances,
  - Legal consulting in administrative law matters,
  - Institutional communication,
  - Elaboration of promotion materials.

== Target groups ==
The beneficiaries of the services offered by Civitas:

- Local government institutions,
- Non-governmental organizations (NGOs),
- Private enterprises,
- Other institutions involved in the local development process.

== Strategic partners ==
- Hungarian Academy for Sciences
- Transylvania Highway Company
- University Babes-Bolyai, Faculty of Political, Administrative and Communication Sciences
- Public Policy Center
- Regional Training center - Békéscsaba, Hungary
- LIA Deutschland
- Microsoft România
- Peace Corps, USA
- Center of Rural Assistance
- Local Councils from Alba and Cluj
- Harvest Hope Pro Homorod
- Foundation for Hungarian NGO's in Transylvania

== Member in networks ==
Civitas Foundation is member in the followings networks:

- RuralNet
- Citizens' Pact for SEE
- Pannonforrás
- Local Social Consortium – Odorheiu Secuiesc
- Citizens Advice Bureau

== Publications ==
- Youth Issues and Challenges
- Social Development Strategy of Odorheiu Secuiesc
- Local Development Officer - policy paper
- Strengthening the Capacity of Local Public Administration to Adopt and Implement Development Policies

== See also ==
- Civitas (disambiguation)
