= Civita (surname) =

Civita is an Italian surname. Notable people with the surname include:

- César Civita (1905–2005), Italian Argentine publisher
- Joana Civita, accused witch in Catalonia (trial 1615 -1619)
- Roberto Civita (1936–2013), Brazilian businessman and publisher
- Victor Civita (1907–1990), Brazilian businessman, publisher and philanthropist
- Ramiro Civita, Argentine cinematographer

== See also ==
- Tullio Levi-Civita (1873–1941), Italian mathematician
