= Civitella Messer Raimondo =

Town in Abruzzo, Italy

- Comune
- Comune di Civitella Messer Raimondo
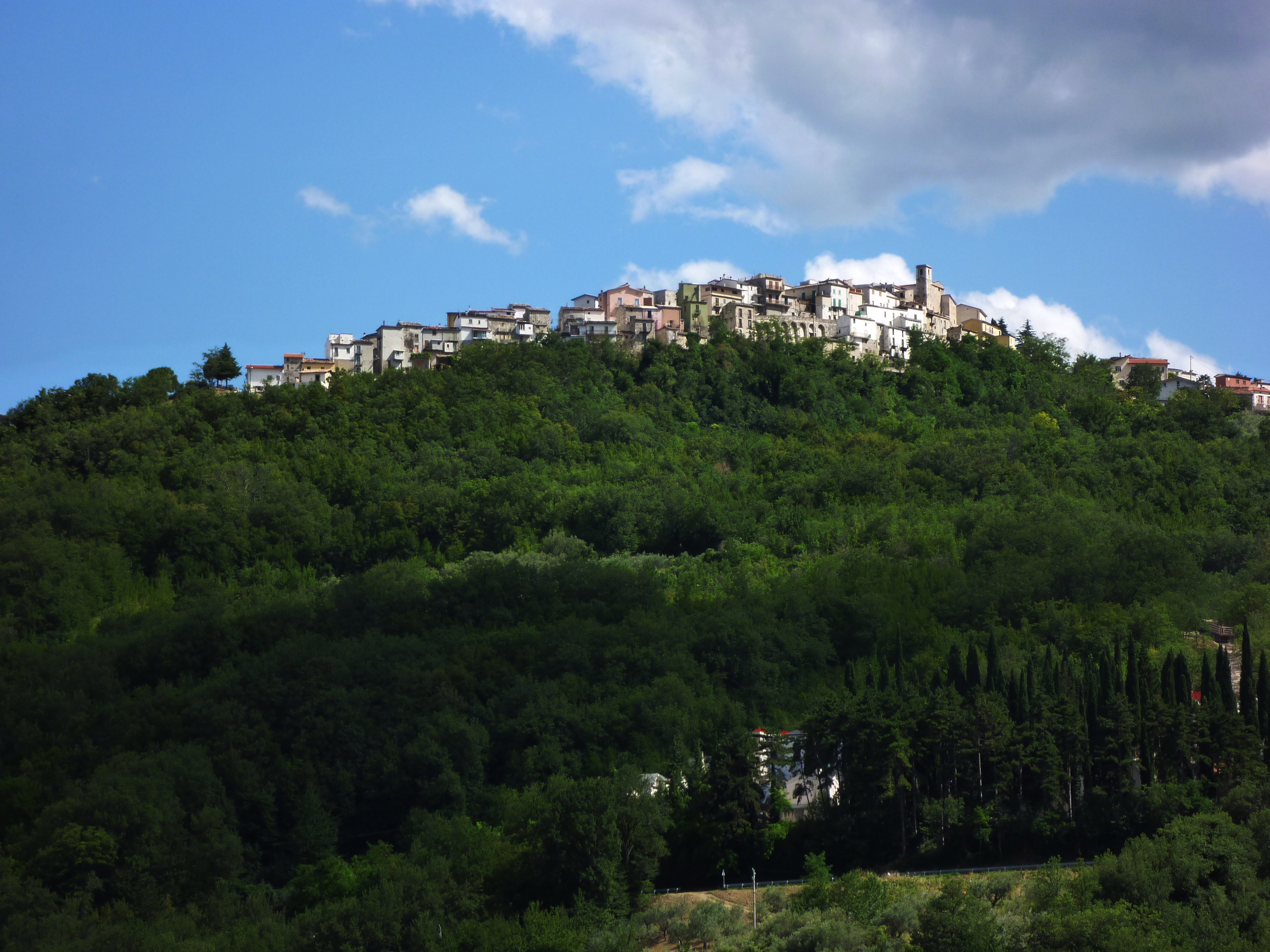
- Panoramic view of Civitella Messer Raimondo

- Location within Italy Location within Abruzzo
- Coordinates: 42°5′N 14°13′E
- Country: Italy
- Region: Abruzzo
- Province: Chieti (CH)
- Frazioni: Calazzotto, Colle San Leonardo, La Fonte, Gallo, Vicenne, La Selva, Forconi, Laruccia, Piano Risorgimento

Area
  - Total: 12 km^{2} (4.6 sq mi)
- Elevation: 613 m (2,011 ft)

Population (2004)
  - Total: 962
  - Density: 80/km^{2} (210/sq mi)
- Demonym: Civitellesi
- Time zone: UTC+1 (CET)
  - Summer (DST): UTC+2 (CEST)
- Postal code: 66010
- Dialing code: 0872
- Patron saint: San Erasmo
- Saint day: June 2
- Website: Official website

Civitella Messer Raimondo (Abruzzese: Ciuvetàlle) is a town in the province of Chieti in the Abruzzo region of Italy, with a population of 890. It is part of the mountain community of Aventino-Medio Sangro. Until 1863, it was known only as Civitella.

== Info ==
Elevation 589 metres (1,932 ft) above sea level, distance from Chieti 48 kilometres (30 mi), population about 812, postal code: 66010, telephone area code 0872. Approach roads: Autoroute A16, Lanciano exit, then about 25 kilometres (16 mi) of secondary roads.

== Geography ==
Civitella Messer Raimondo is divided on a hill to the right of the Verde River, a tributary of dell'Aventino. The municipal territory, which extends for 12.37 square kilometres (4.78 mi^{2}), includes the towns of Calazzotto, Gallo, Selva and La Fonte.

== History ==
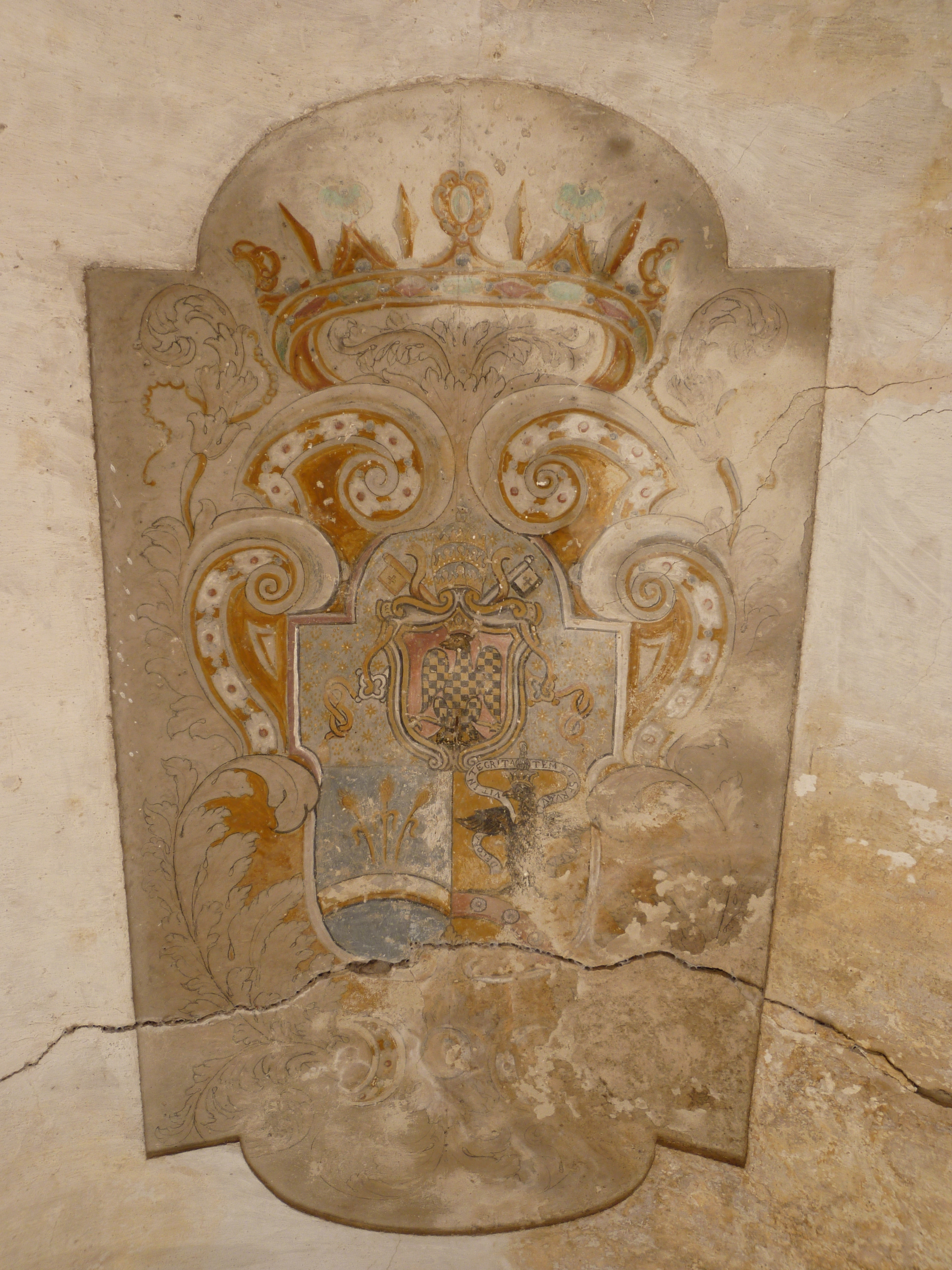
Heraldic Coat of Arms of the Baglioni family

The presence of settlements of the Palaeolithic period and confirmed by the discovery of cave paintings at the cave of La Pineta. Other excavations have unearthed prehistoric finds in the locality Fonte Liberatori and the remains of tombs with a large set of bronze furnishings, also dating back to prehistoric times. The tempering of a thermal building of the Roman period, adorned with mosaics, on the hill called Il Piano, suggests a continuity of settlements. The first documented news of Civitella Messer Raimondo are of the 12th century, the period of "Civitellam", in which it was a fiefdom held by a soldier, Manerius de Palena, perhaps a descendant of Oderisio II Valva, subfeudatario Count Bohemond of Manoppello. The area was then mentioned in the 14th century between the years 1308 and 1326 due to the Prior ecclesie Santa Maria di Civitella and the clerics of the site. In the first half of the 15th century, Raimondo da Anichino was in control of the town's castle. The last feudal lords of country were the Baglioni family, from which derives the name of the mansion that the aforesaid family left in the country.

== Monuments and places of interest ==
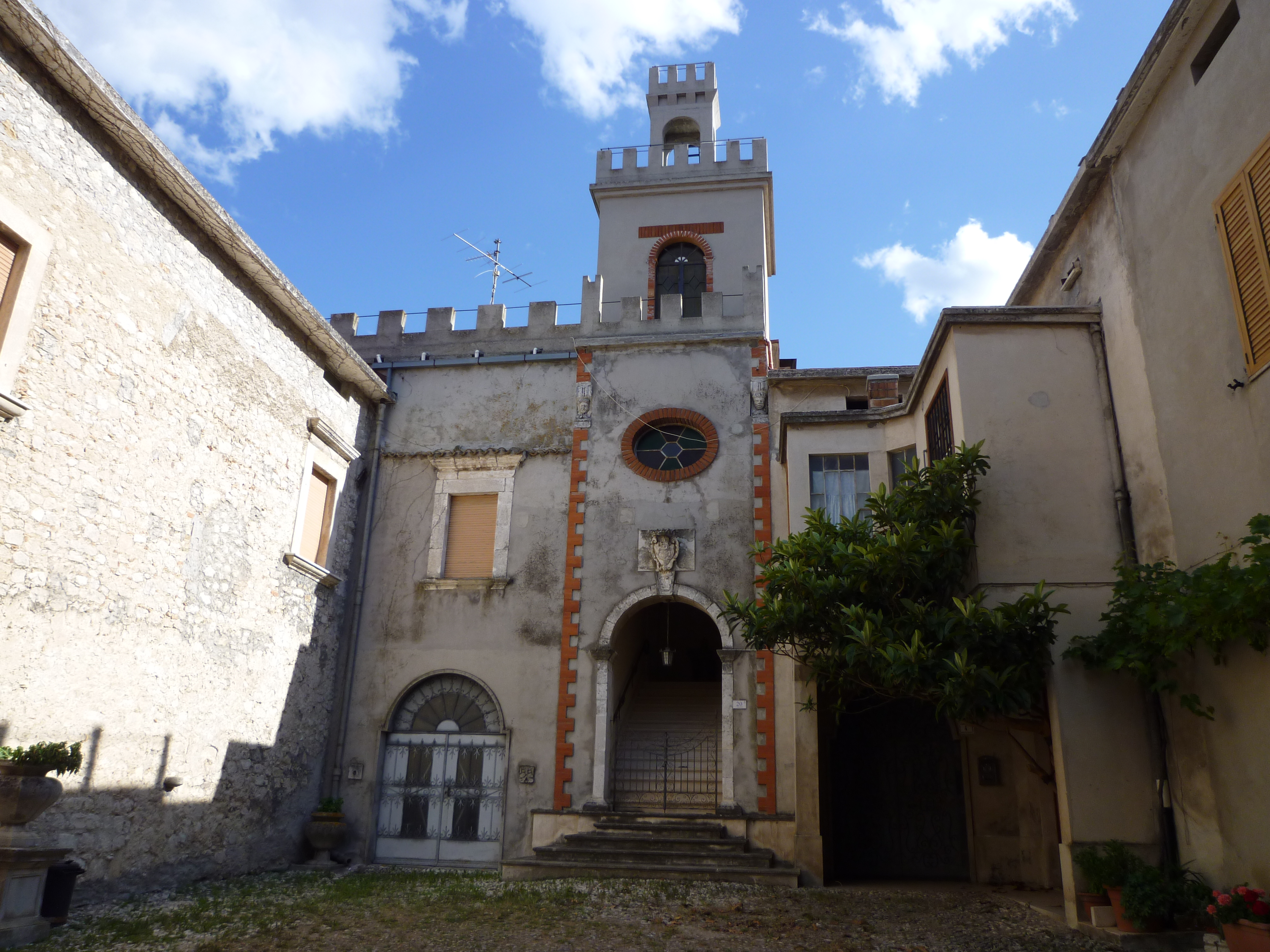
Tower near the internal courtyard

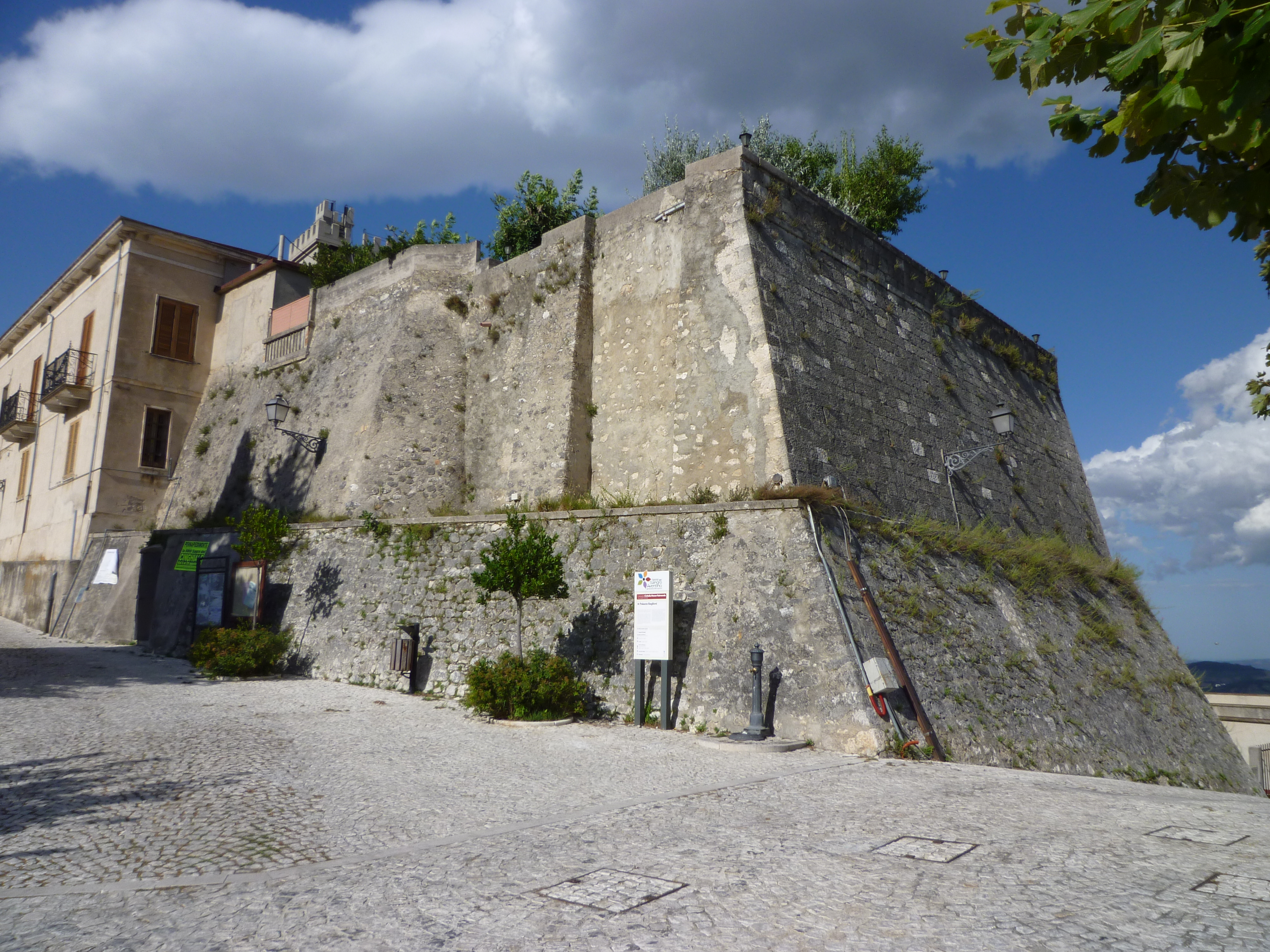
The Bastions

Castello o palazzo dei conti Baglioni: of medieval origin, the building has been the subject of numerous alterations over the years. The current building dates back to the 18th century, when there settled the Baglioni family. Situated on the right corner of the main façade is a corner tower, made of shelve stone covered in brick, used for defensive purposes. The two remaining bastions are made of stone. The entrance, made of Maiella stone, surmounted by a balcony on stone corbels on which are arranged three openings. Through the hallway, whose barrel vault houses the heraldic coat of arms of the noble family, access is provided to the courtyard of the building.

Palazzo Gattone: Building placed on the hilly ridge on which it divided the village, and accessible through an alley of Corso Umberto I. The portal is made of hewn stone. It has a portico, in front of the building, which runs along two levels and consists of stone arches, through which they are placed the inner vaults, barrel. It presents in conditions quite precarious, with ample degraded areas and deeply injured.

Chiesa del Santissimo Salvatore (Church of the Holy Savior): dating back to the 13th century, has a sober façade painted yellow. The main entrance, surmounted by a triangular frame containing a mosaic depicting Sant'Erasmo. The interior is divided into three aisles, covered by barrel vaults. The pillars and columns are decorated with fake marble.
