= José Juan Santesteban =

José Juan Santesteban (San Sebastián, 26 March 1809 – San Sebastián, 13 January 1884) was a Basque composer, father of José Antonio Santesteban. In 1844 — 1879 he was organist in Santa Maria, Donostia.

== Works ==
- La Tapada, Spanish zarzuela
- 22 masses
- Método teórica-práctico de Canto llano
- Método elemental de solfeo
- Oriamendi - The anthem associated with the Carlist Movement
