= Baltimore Civitas Middle/High School =

Location
- 2000 Edgewood St. Baltimore, Maryland 21216; United States; 39°18′37″N 76°40′37″W

Information
- School type: Public, Charter (formerly/similar)
- Motto: "Be engaged"
- Founded: 2007
- School district: Baltimore City Public Schools
- Superintendent: Dr. Gregory Thornton [CEO]
- School number: 343
- Principal: Frederick Rivers
- Grades: 6-12 (for the 2011-2012 school year)
- Enrollment: 343 (2014)
- Area: Urban
- Colors: Gray and Green
- Website: www.baltimorecityschools.org/343

The Civitas Middle/High School was a public secondary school in Fairmount, Baltimore City, Maryland, United States situated in the Walbrook Campus where it was originally established in 2007. Walbrook was currently closed down and two schools operated inside of the building - beside's Civitas, Bulford Drew Jemison Academy was also operating on the other half of the building. Baltimore Civitas Middle/High School was changed into a transformation middle and high school at the beginning of the 2011–12 school year. Later, the Civitas Middle/High School operated in Dr. Roland N Park Middle School.

Baltimore City Schools selected Civitas as one of several schools to close in 2014.
