= María de Ximildegui =

María de Ximildegui (c. 1588 - d. after 1 November 1610) was a Spanish alleged witch. She was one of the people charged with sorcery in the Basque witch trials (1609-1614). She played an important role in the development of the Basque witch trials.

She was born in Zugarramurdi in Spain. When she was sixteen in 1604, she moved to the French side of the border to work as a maidservant in France. She moved back to Zugarramurdi in 1608. During this time, there were many rumours if witchcraft due to the ongoing Labord witch trials on the other side of the French border. María de Ximildegui claimed, that during her time in France, she had a relationship with a fellow maidservant, who had introduced her to witchcraft. She had continued to attend the witches' sabbath in Spain, were they took place in the caves of Navarre. She claimed to regret her sorcery, and pointed out fellow witches. This resulted in an investigation of witchcraft by the Spanish Inquisition.

She was arrested by the inquisitor Valle Alvarado in 1609. She was charged with witchcraft and participation in the witches' sabbath in Zugarramurdi. She was investigated by the Spanish Inquisition in Logroño.

Of about 7.000 people accused in the Basque witch trials, only six were ultimately executed. They were condemned to be executed by the Inquisition because they had repeatedly refused to confess, regret and ask for mercy, despite having been accused for a number of sorcery acts by several different people. María de Ximildegui was not among the executed, since she confessed and regretted sorcery and asked for mercy, which she was customarily granted.

She was thus not one of them executed in the autodafé in Logrono 1 November 1610. She belonged to those pardoned and released. Her life after 1610 is unknown.
