= José Antonio Santesteban =

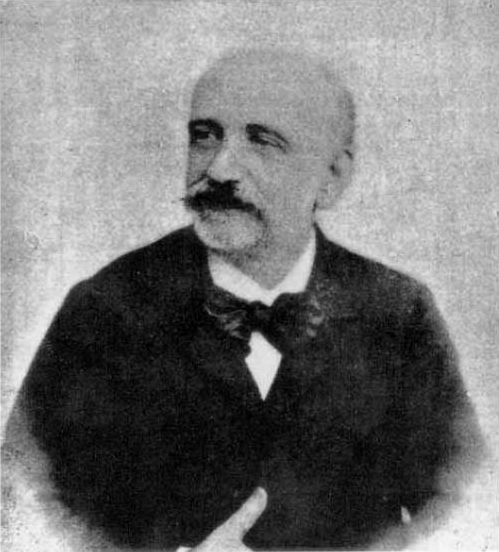
José Antonio Santesteban (1835—1906)

José Antonio Santesteban (18 October 1835 in San Sebastián – 21 September 1906 in San Sebastián) was a Basque composer, the most famous of the musical family of that name (his father was José Juan Santesteban and his son was pianist Jesús de Santesteban), who wrote the first opera in Basque, Pudente, to a libretto by Serafin Baroja. In 1879 he succeeded his father's post as organist in Santa Maria, Donostia.

In 1863 he inaugurated the installment of a Cavaillé-Coll organ in Santa Maria, Donostia and in 1879 he succeeded his father's post as organist of the parish.

== Works ==
- Pudente, the first Basque opera (2 acts, 15 music numbers, including Gernikako Arbola)
- 12 masses for grand orchestra
- 2 Misereres (1 for 4 voices)
- Psalms
- Motets
- 24 Préludes pour piano, op. 84 (with dedication "to my friend Tomás Bretón")
- Cantos y Bailes Tradicionales Vascongados
