= Basilica of Saint Mary of the Chorus =

Church in San Sebastián, Spain

Basilica of Saint Mary of the Angelic Choir Koruko Andre Mariaren basilika Basílica de Nuestra Señora del Coro
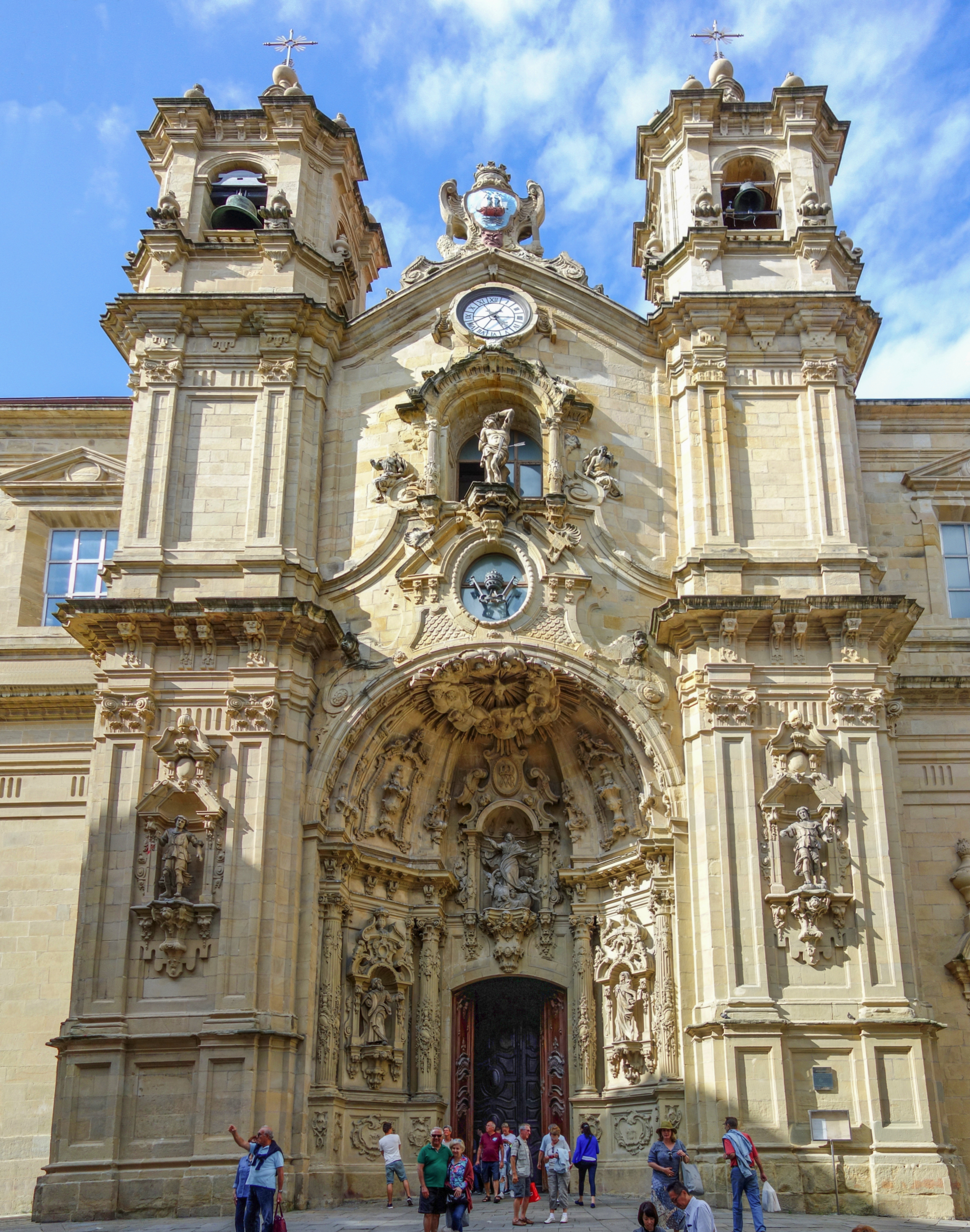
- Entrance of the basilica viewed from Nagusia street.

Religion
- Affiliation: Roman Catholic
- Ecclesiastical or organisational status: parish church, minor basilica
- Year consecrated: 30 July 1897

Location
- Location: San Sebastián, Spain
- Interactive map of Basilica of Saint Mary of the Angelic Choir; Koruko Andre Mariaren basilika Basílica de Nuestra Señora del Coro
- Coordinates: 43°19′26.3″N 1°59′12.2″W

Architecture
- Type: Church
- Style: Baroque
- Completed: 1774

Specifications
- Direction of façade: S
- Length: 63 metres (207 ft)
- Width: 43 metres (141 ft)
- Spire: 2

Website
- www.elizagipuzkoa.org

The Basilica of Saint Mary of Coro (Basque: Koruko Andre Mariaren basilika, Spanish: Basílica de Nuestra Señora del Coro) is a baroque Roman Catholic parish church and minor basilica completed in 1774. It is located in the "Parte Vieja" (Old Town) of the city of San Sebastián, Gipuzkoa, Basque Country, Spain.

== Interior ==
The main nave consists of a large space of 48 by 33 metres (157 ft × 108 ft) divided into three naves, which in turn can be divided into 4 zones having as axis the pillars of the nave. Six pillars and the walls with pillars act as a buttress supporting the vaults. The octagonal pillars reach, up to their capitals, a height of 15 metres (49 ft). The central dome is 27 metres (89 ft) high. At the end of the nave, on the right side, different rooms are used by the parish and other services: daily chapel, sacristy and storage rooms.

== Exterior ==
The main entrance is located between the two towers and looks as an altarpiece with its tortured figure of Saint Sebastian and the papal symbols that prove the status of minor basilica. The shield of the city crowns the building.

== Gallery ==
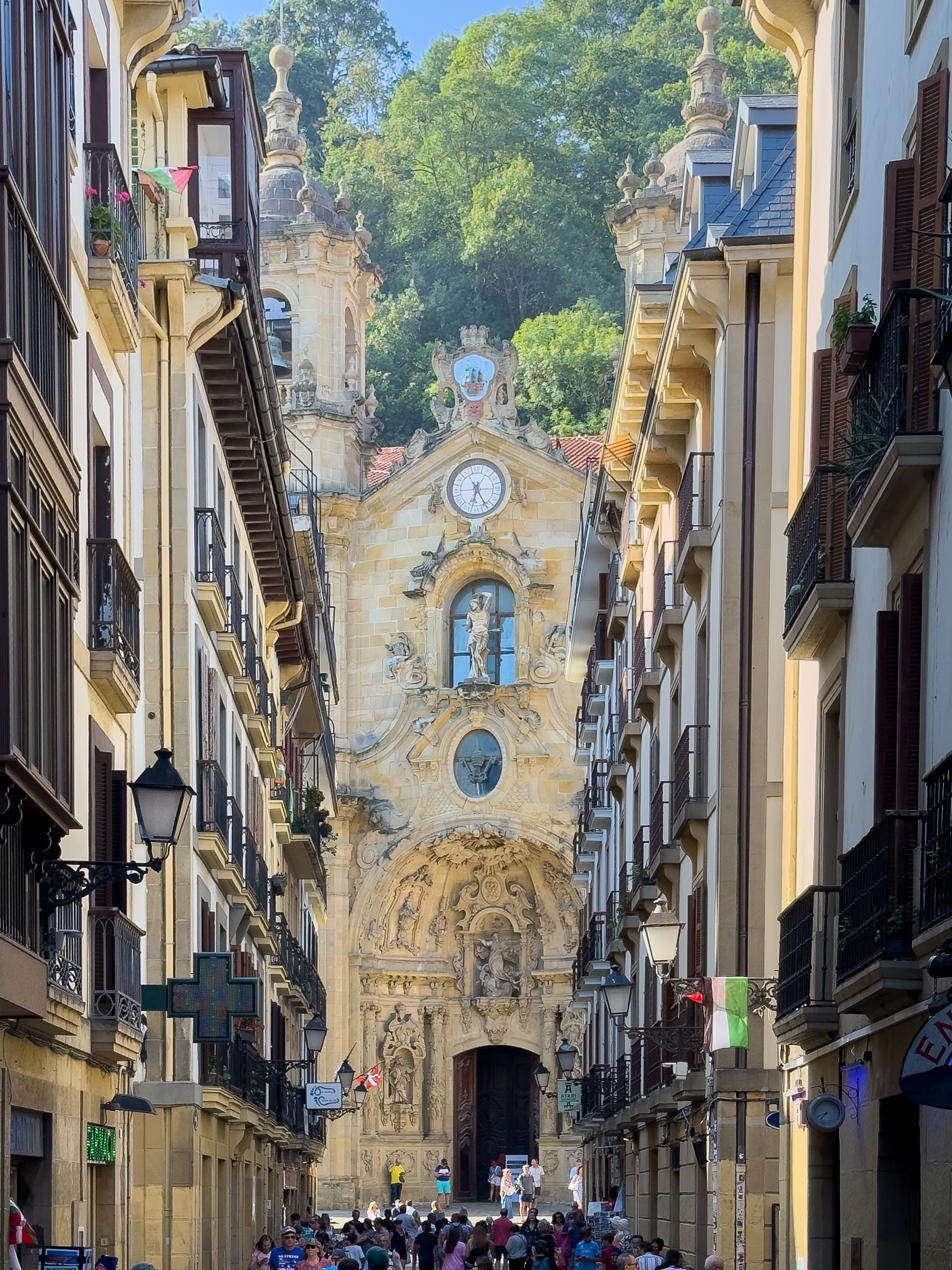

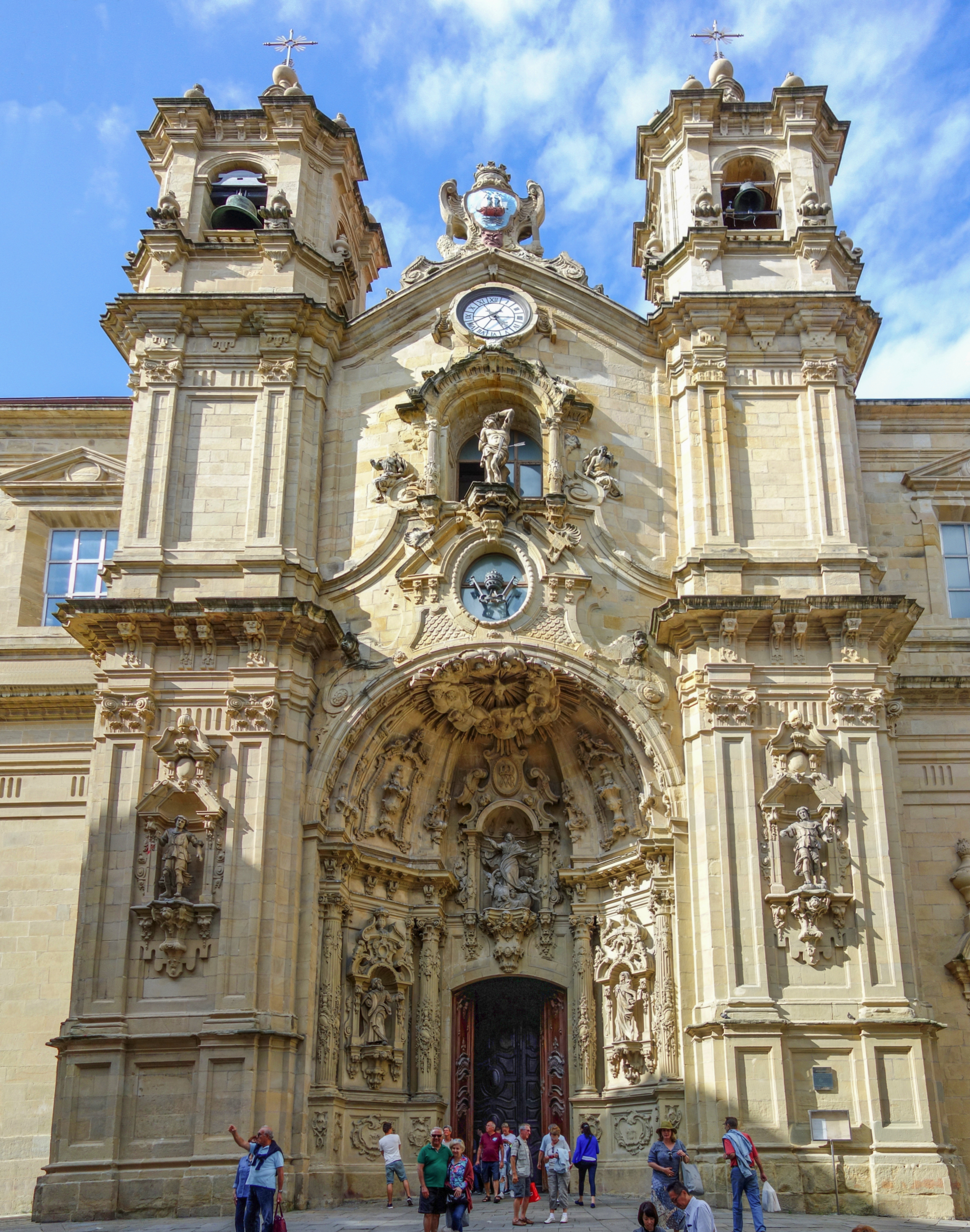

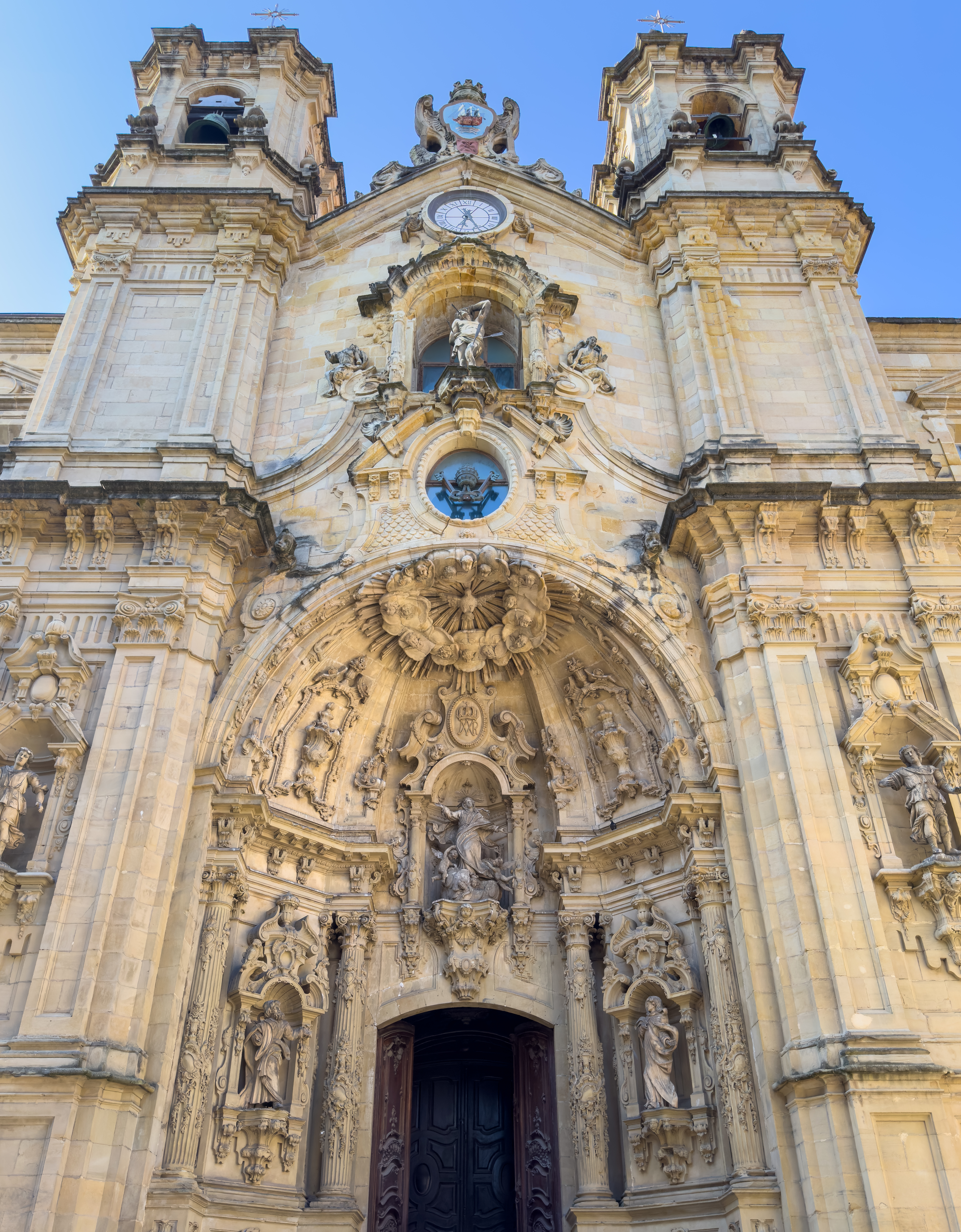

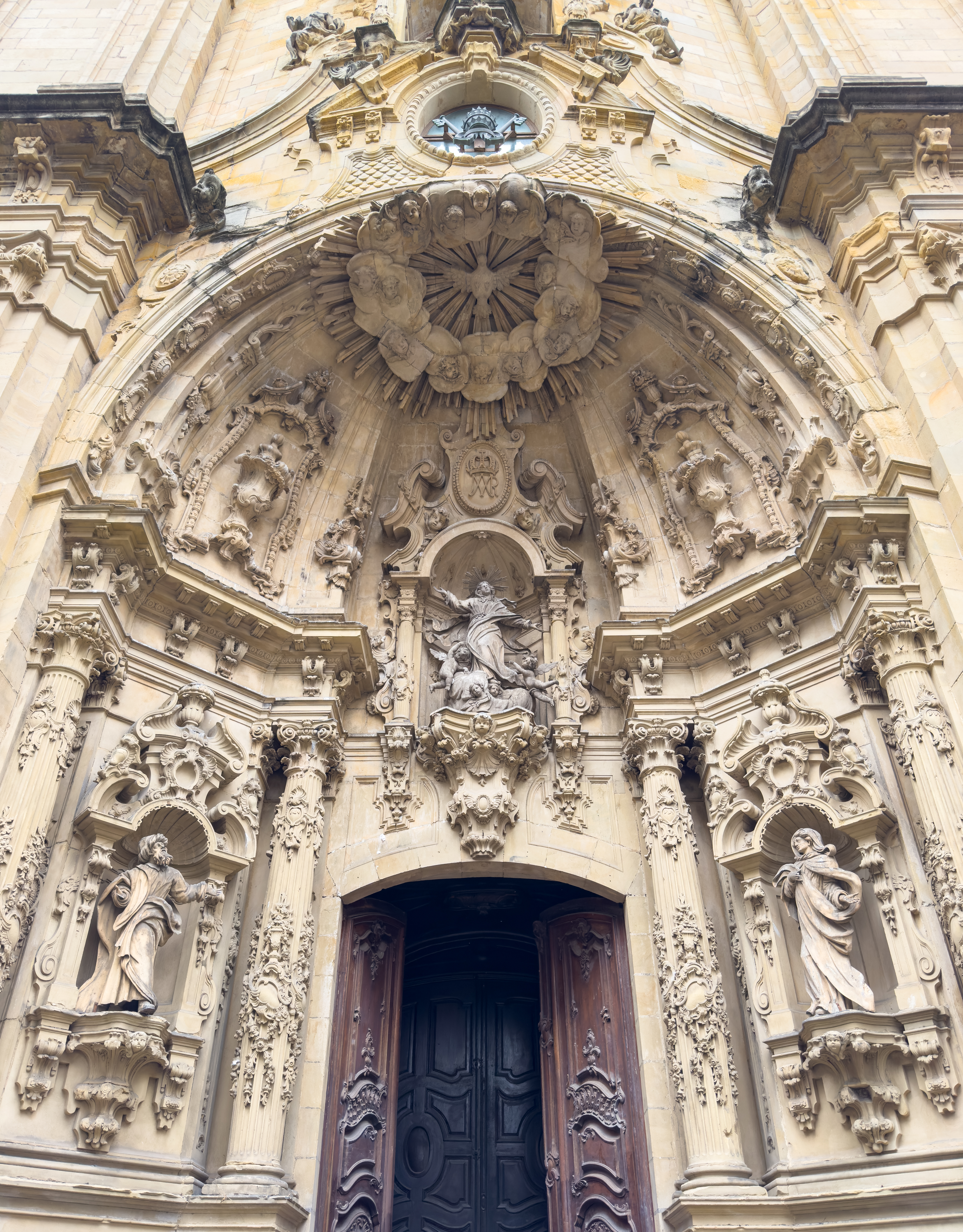

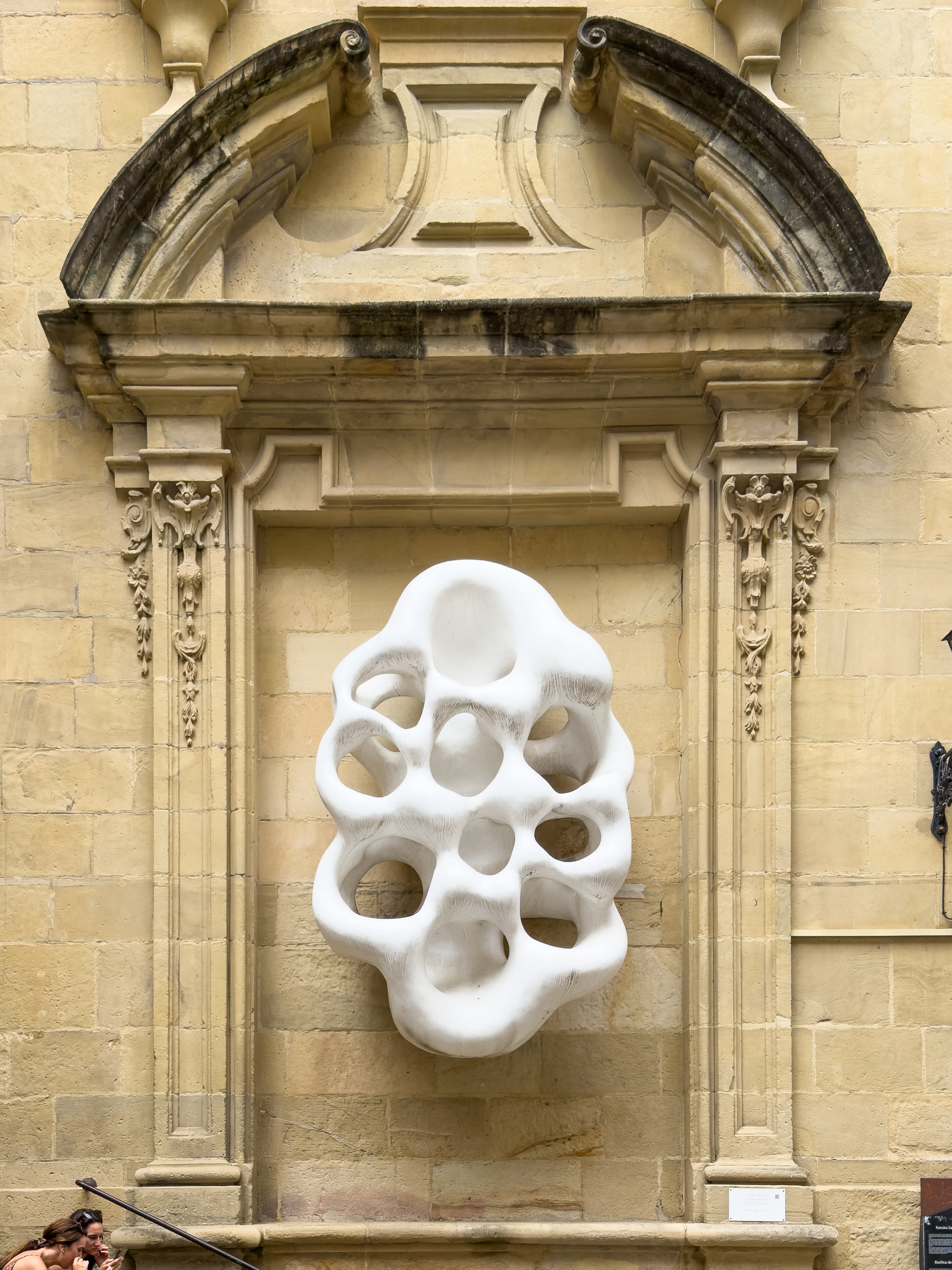

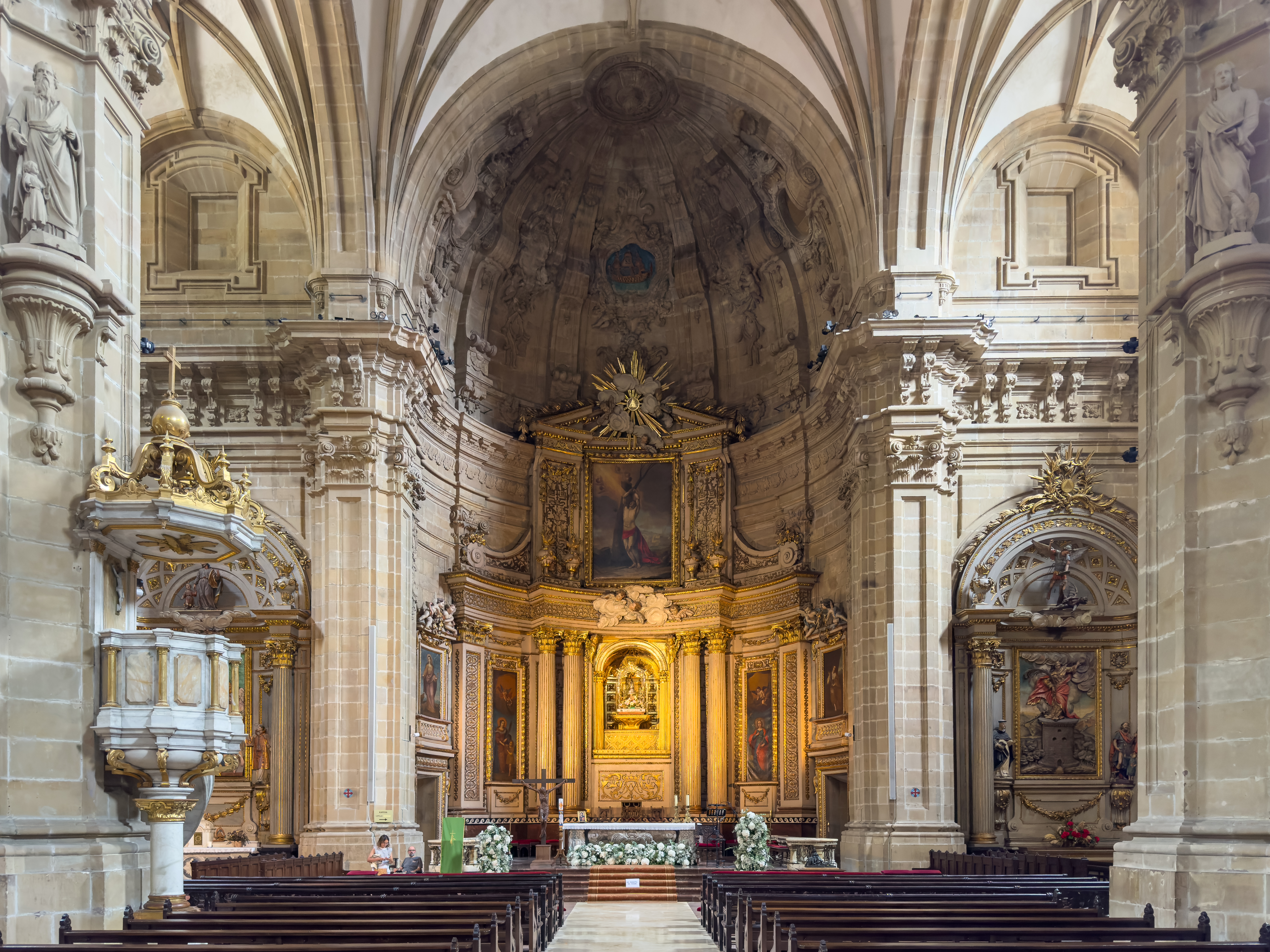

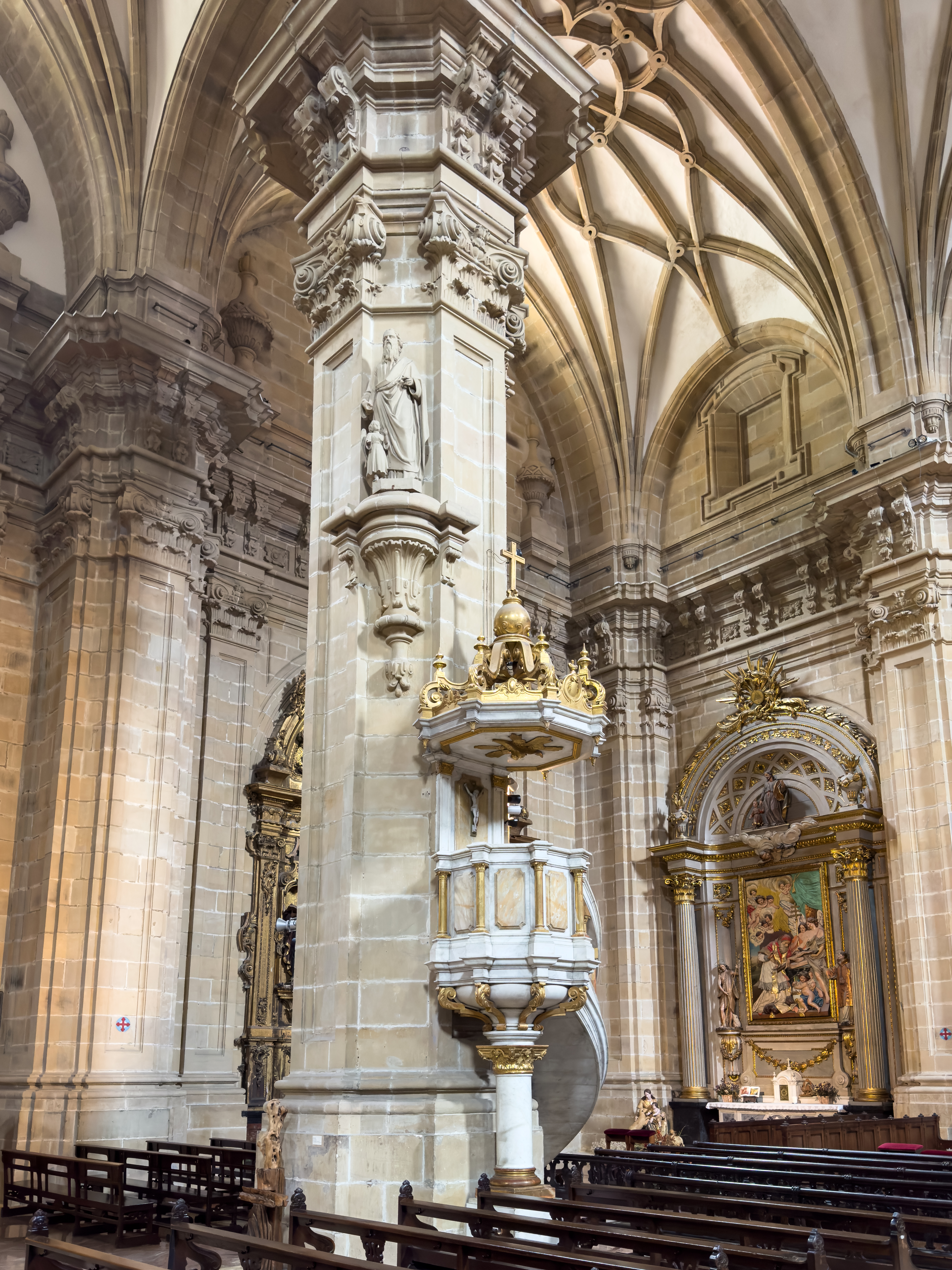

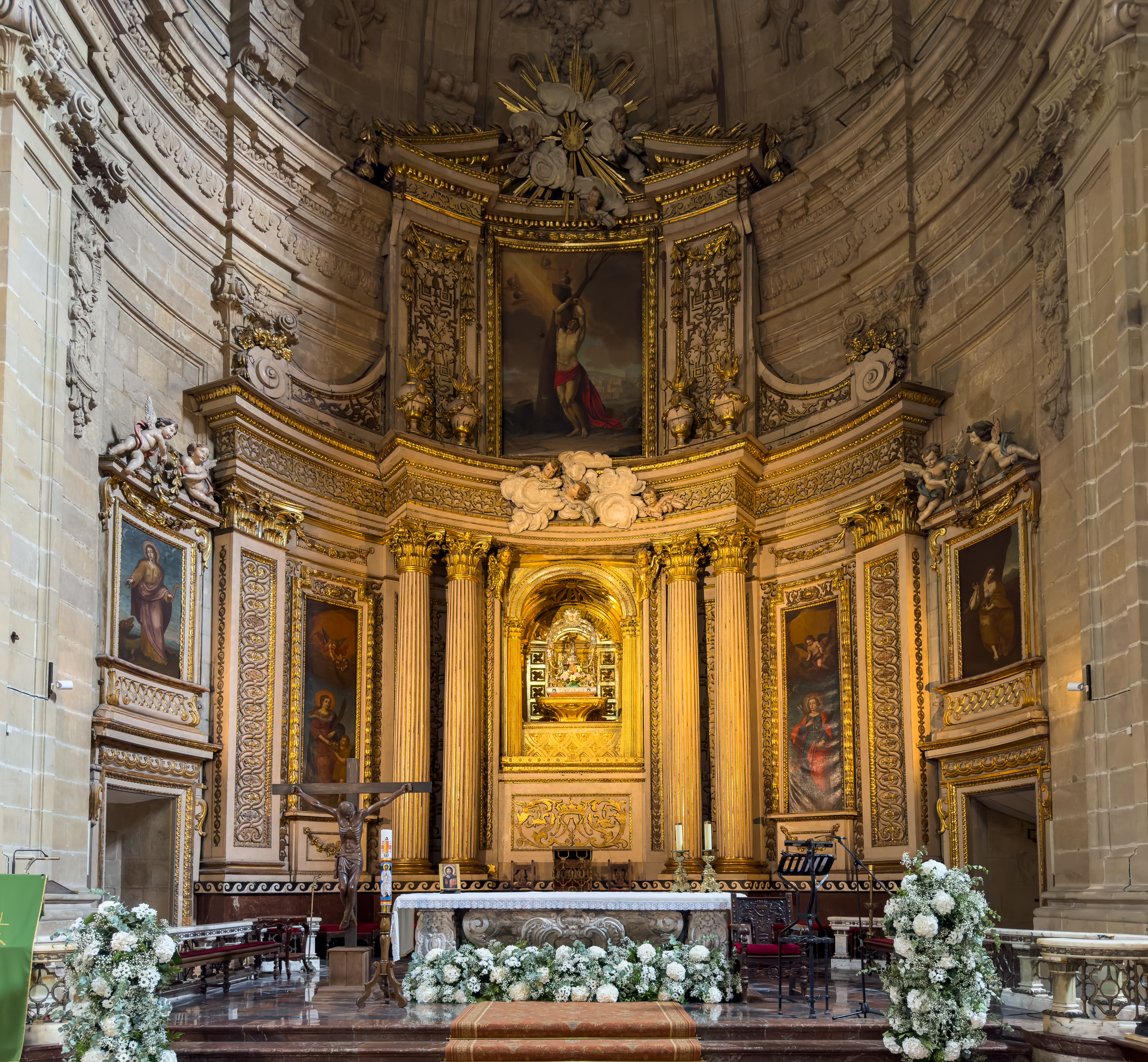

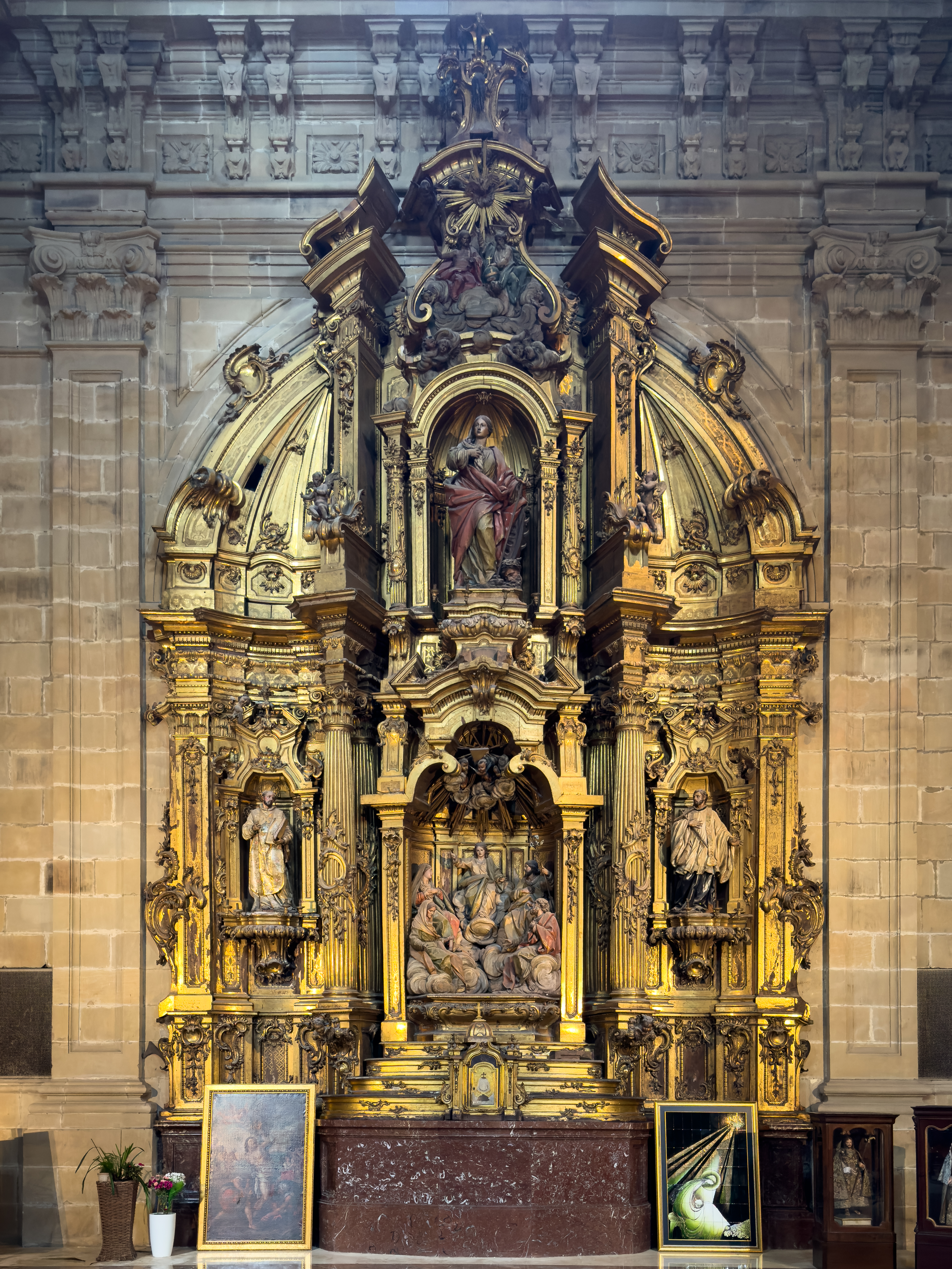

== See also ==
- Catholic Church in Spain
