= XHUAM-FM =

University radio station in Mexico City

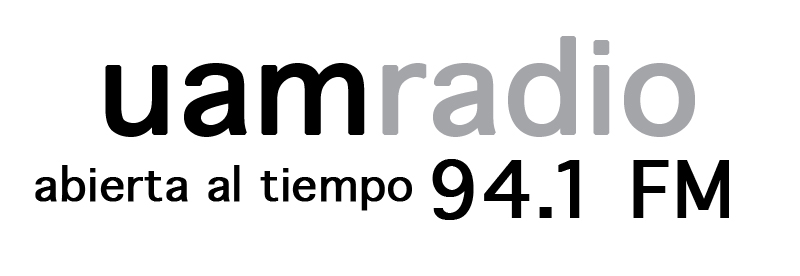

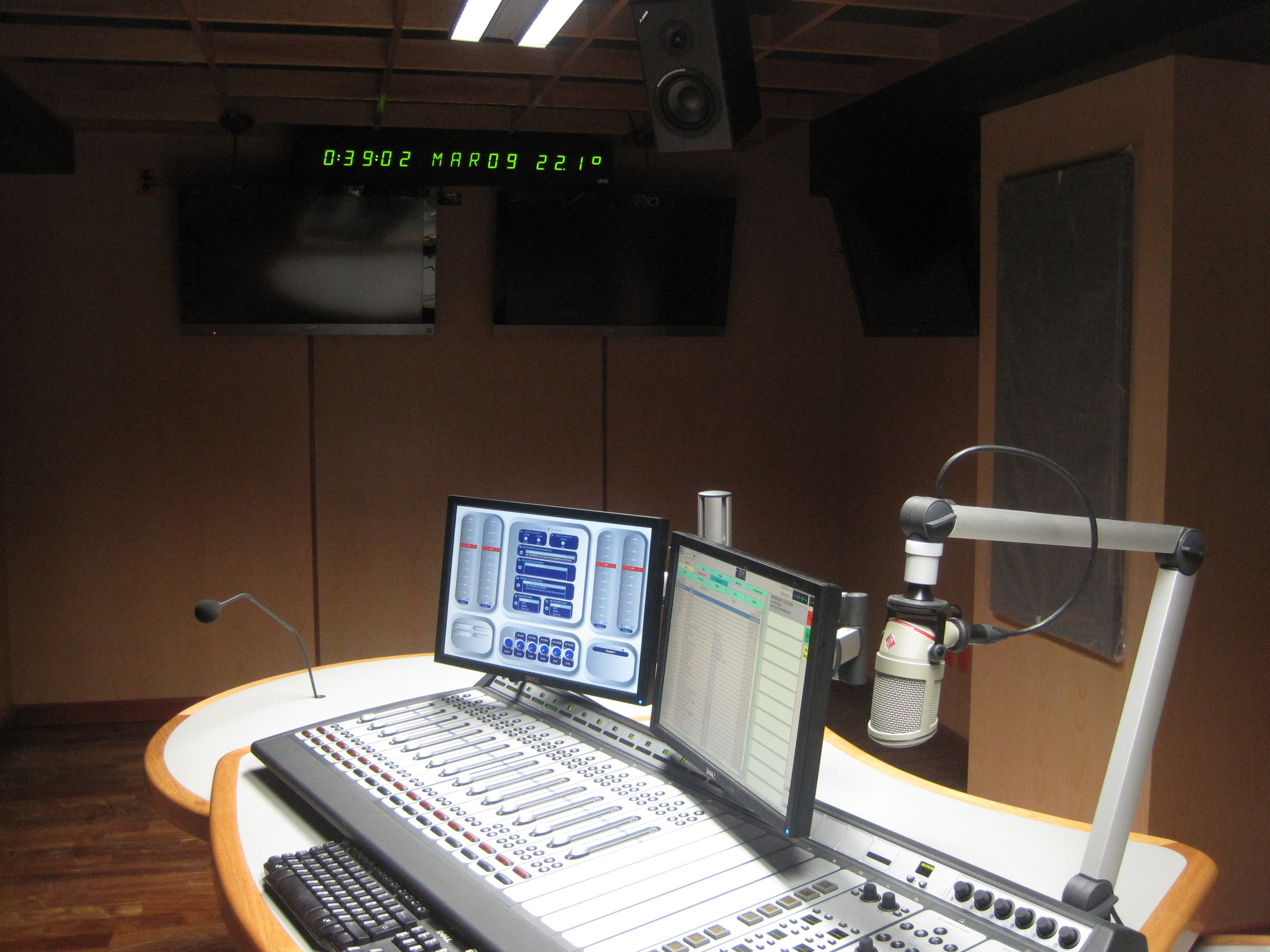
- Mexico City; Mexico
- Broadcast area: Greater Mexico City
- Frequency: 94.1 MHz
- Branding: UAM Radio

Programming
- Format: University cultural

Ownership
- Owner: Universidad Autónoma Metropolitana

History
- First air date: 11 March 2011
- Call sign meaning: Universidad Autónoma Metropolitana

Technical information
- Licensing authority: CRT
- Class: A
- ERP: 3 kW
- HAAT: −1.3 meters (−4.3 ft)
- Transmitter coordinates: 19°23′41.1″N 99°14′00.9″W

Links
- Webcast: http://uamradio.uam.mx/contenido/cnt/envivo/index.html
- Website: http://uamradio.uam.mx

XHUAM-FM, known as UAM Radio, is the radio station of the Universidad Autónoma Metropolitana, established in 2011 and currently broadcasts from a UAM building in Avenida Constituyentes.

== History ==
=== Single-frequency network ===
UAM Radio originally broadcast on 94.1 FM from five 20-watt transmitters at various UAM facilities, each of which is located at a different UAM facility in Mexico City:

- XHUAMR-FM at the General Rectory, which houses the studio facilities
- XHUAMA-FM at the Unidad Azcapotzalco
- XHUAMC-FM at the Unidad Cuajimalpa
- XHUAMI-FM at the Unidad Iztapalapa
- XHUAMX-FM at the Unidad Xochimilco

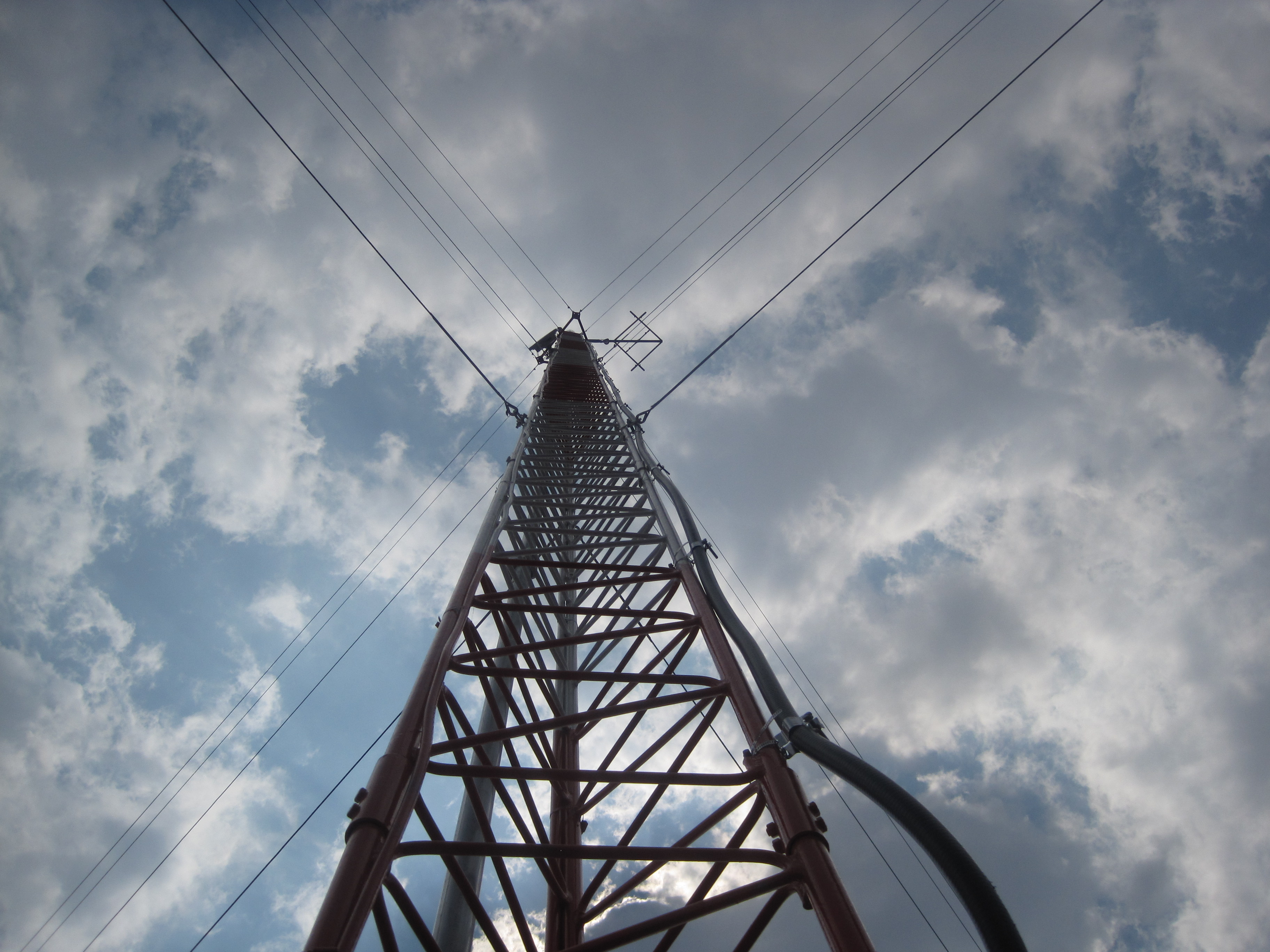
The XHUAMR-FM transmitter

It is estimated that the transmitter network covered 70% of Mexico City.

The permits for these stations were awarded by Cofetel on January 27, 2010. The network signed on March 11, 2011, bringing the 94.1 FM frequency back to use in Mexico City for the first time since the closure of XHFM-FM in 1957.

=== Conversion to a single transmitter ===
In July 2017, the Federal Telecommunications Institute authorized UAM Radio to begin using one transmitter, from the Cuajimalpa site, using the callsign XHUAM-FM and with a power increase to 3,000 watts, expanding reception to eastern portions of the State of Mexico. The university sought the change because its single-frequency network was "not sufficient to provide an efficient FM radio service to Mexico City".

Testing began for the higher-power transmissions from Cuajimalpa in March 2018.

== Format ==
The format is largely cultural in nature. Some programs utilize UAM resources and are produced by departments at the various UAM units.
