= Tessy María López Goerne =

Mexican solid-state chemist

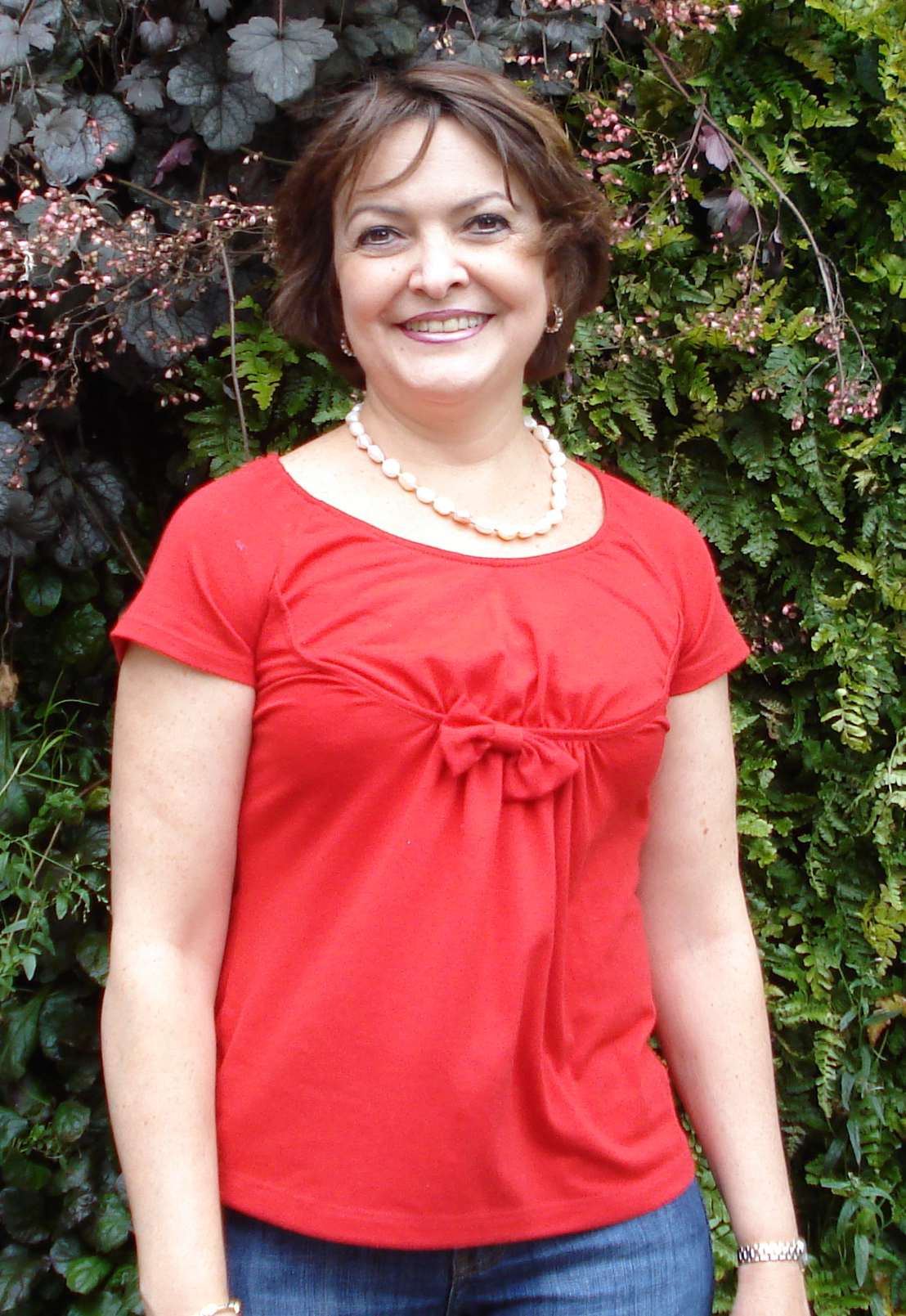
- Born: October 22, 1961 (age 65); Guanajuato, Mexico
- Education: UAM Iztapalapa
- Employer: Universidad Autónoma Metropolitana

Tessy María López Goerne (born October 22, 1961) is a Mexican solid-state chemist, professor, researcher, academic, and popular science communicator. She has specialized in the fields of nanotechnology and nanomedicine, as well as being a pioneer in catalytic nanomedicine. She directs the Nanotechnology and Nanomedicine Laboratories at the Universidad Autónoma Metropolitana Xochimilco (UAM-X) plant and the National Institute of Neurology and Neurosurgery.

== Early life and education ==
López Goerne was born in Guanajuato City Mexico October 22, 1961. She graduated from the University of Guanajuato at the age of 17 where her father was a scientist. She obtained a Masters in Solid State physics and a PhD in Material Science from the Universidad Autónoma Metropolitana.

In 2005 she founded the research Lab in Nanotechnology & Medicine at the Autonomous Metropolitan University in Guanajuato Mexico. Her research focused on using nanoparticles to treat Epilepsy and Parkinson's.

== Research and academics ==
López Goerne has worked as a researcher in the fields of molecular photodynamics, photocatalysts and bionanomaterials, soft materials and nanostructured reservoirs for controlled release of drugs. She was a research professor at Tulane University.

== TESSKIN NANO gel ==
TESSKIN NANO is a medical device with a sanitary registration issued by COFEPRIS. Developed by López Goerne.

== Awards and distinctions ==
- Weizmann Award for the doctoral thesis "Proceso Sol-gel" (Weizmann Institute of Science and Mexican Academy of Sciences, 1991)
- Presea Marcos Moshinsky National Youth Science and Technology Award, awarded in Mexico by the Secretariat of Public Education (1991)
- National Award of the Mexican Academy of Sciences (1993)
- Manuel Noriega Morales Award in the area of Exact Sciences (Organization of American States, 1993)
- Javed Hussain UNESCO Award in Sciences (1995)
- Zazil-Avon Science and Culture Award (Avon Cosmetics, 1997)
- National System of Researchers Level III (Conacyt, 1998 to present)
- Founding president of the Sol-Gel Science and Technology Society (Mexico, 2002 to present)
- Consolidated Academic Body (September 2005 to present)
- Cámara Nacional de la Industria Farmacéutica Award (2006)
- Scopus Award (2009)
- Active Elsevier editorial board member

== Published works ==
López Goerne has written more than 200 research articles in journals indexed under the ISI standard, as well as two research books.

=== Books ===
- Nanotecnología y nanomedicina: la ciencia del futuro...hoy. Arkhé Ediciones.
- Nanomedicina catalítica: ciencia y cáncer. Arkhé Ediciones.

=== Outreach works ===
- El mundo mágico del vidrio. Colección La Ciencia desde México. Fondo de Cultura Mexicana.
- Psst, psst, tú, ¿sabes qué son los cristales? Cuentos infantiles. (Sociedad Mexicana de Cristalografía, 2000)
- El amor en los tiempos de la contaminación Colección La Ciencia desde México (Fondo de Cultura Económica, 2004).
- El despertar de la epilepsia (Universidad Autónoma Metropolitana, 2006)

=== Educational material for children ===
- El estado sólido (audiovisual, 1984)
- La química, brujería... ¿o qué? (audiovisual, 1995)
- Cristalografía para niños (audiovisual, 1998)
- Taller de cristalografía para niños (1999)
- Psst—-psst—-tu. Sabes que son los cristales (2000)
- Los tres estados de la materia (theater and audiovisual work, 2003)
- Taller interactivo para niños: El enigma del ingenioso artefacto llamado cerebro (2006)
