= Asa Cristina Laurell =

Mexican sociologist

- Born: Asa Cristina Laurell; 20 December 1943 (age 82); Sweden
- Education: Lund University; University of California, Berkeley; National University of Misiones; Universidad Autonama Xochimilco
- Known for: Sociology and healthcare in Mexico
- Scientific career
- Fields: Sociology and Health
- Workplaces: Mexican Government

Asa Cristina Laurell is a Mexican sociologist who has had a long career in both research and government positions. She grew up in Sweden, but her education eventually brought her to Mexico. In Mexico, she was awarded two degrees and conducted research that focused on health policy, including ensuring access to health care for people in Mexico and various other Latin American countries. She is known for her role in helping to found the Latin American Association of Social Medicine (ALAMES), as well as the contributions she has made to widening access to health care for Mexicans during her time in government. This included serving as Undersecretary of Integration and Development at the Ministry of Health in Mexico.

== Early life ==
Laurell was born 20 December 1943 in Sweden and grew up there.

== Education ==
Laurell received her undergraduate degree with a specialization in medical surgery from the University of Lund. She graduated from the University of Lund in 1967 and then went on to study on a scholarship at the University of California, Berkeley. She was active politically during her undergraduate studies. She actively partook in many protests, many of which were against the Vietnam War. She obtained her master's degree in Public Health with a specialty in epidemiology and graduated and then emigrated to Mexico in 1971. After she moved to Mexico, she spent time working, before attending the Universidad Nacional de Misiones of Argentina (UNAM). She graduated from Universidad Nacional de Misiones of Argentina in 1987, with a doctorate in sociology. In 1988, she entered the National System of Researchers.

== Career ==
=== Academic work ===
After emigrating to Mexico she was offered a position at the National Autonomous University of Mexico (UNAM). She worked there from 1972 to 1976 as a professor and a researcher. In 1976, she was offered a position at the Universidad Autonama Xochimilco (UAM X). Her main job was as a researcher and she focused on health disease as a social process. During her time at this university she studied social medicine, social classes, and work processes. During this time, she published papers that discussed how neoliberal health policies in various Latin American countries could be more progressive to help more patients. During her time in academia, she was also a founding member of an organization called the Latin American Association of Social Medicine (ALAMES). This organization was founded in 1984 and is a public health group that is focused on "a social, political, and academic movement aimed at guiding public health and social medicine toward resolution of the historical and social determinants of the health-disease care process."

=== Political work ===
Laurell has also been a prominent figure in politics in Mexico. In 2000, the Head of the Government of the Federal District in Mexico asked her to become the Secretary of Health. She held this position until 2006. During her time as the Secretary of Health, she implemented many programs and began fighting for universal health care in Mexico. In her time in this position, she was described as having a "vision of a fully tax-funded, free at the point-of-care health system integrating financing and provision." While working as the Secretary of Health, she implemented a Free Medication and Medical Services Program (PSMMG). This program was aimed to provide access to health care and medication to all Mexican citizens and was adopted in 2006. In 2006, she resigned from her position in order to work for Andrés Manuel López Obrador in his campaign for president. In 2018, Andres invited her to work for him and she became the Undersecretary of Integration and Development of the Ministry of Health. In this position she helped champion the transformation of Mexican health care which included the aim of ensuring that all Mexicans have access to free health care and medication, regardless of their socioeconomic status. She resigned in July 2020 due to a personal disagreement with the president's health policy.

=== Latin American Association of Social Medicine (ALAMES) ===
The Latin American Association of Social Medicine (ALAMES) was founded by a group of sociologists, political figures, and public health experts from various Latin American countries in 1984. Laurell was one of the founding members of this group and continues to contribute to this day. This group is focused on improving health care practices by guiding politicians and lawmakers to consider socioeconomic classes, including the social detriments that can affect people's access to health care. This group now exists in some form in all countries on the American continent.

== Publications ==
- Lasting Lessons From Social Ideas and Movements of the Sixties on Latin American Public Health published in the American Journal of Public Health, May 2018
- Social policy and health policy in Latin America: a field of political struggle, published in Cadernos de Saúde Pública, July 2017
- Three Decades of Neoliberalism in Mexico: The Destruction of Society, published in the International Journal of Health Services, Mar 2015
- Contradicciones en salud: sobre acumulación y legitimidad en los gobiernos neoliberales y sociales de derecho en América Latina, published in Saúde em Debate, Nov 2014
- The right to health: What model for Latin America?, published in The Lancet, October 2014
- Mexican Health Insurance: Uncertain universal coverage, published in Ciencia & saude coletiva, May 2011
- Can Insurance Guarantee Universal Access to Health Services?, published in Social Medicine, Nov 2010
- La Segunda Reforma de Salud. Aseguramiento y compra-venta de servicios, published in Salud colectiva, August 2010
- WHO and pandemic flu. What happened in Mexico, published in BMJ, June 2010
- An Overview of Latin American Health Policies and Debates, published in Social Medicine, March 2010
- What happened in Mexico, published in BMJ Clinical Research, December 2009
- Bringing Latin America's Progressive Health Reforms Out of the Closet, published in Social Medicine, June 2008
- Health Reform in Mexico City, 2000–2006, published in Social Medicine, June 2008
- Health System Reform in Mexico: A Critical Review, published in International Journal of Health Services, January 2007
- What Does Latin American Social Medicine Do When It Governs? The Case of the Mexico City Government, published in the American Journal of Public Health, December 2003
- Health Reform in Mexico: The Promotion of Inequality, published in the International Journal of Health Services, January 2001
- Structural Adjustment and the Globalization of Social Policy in Latin America, published in International Sociology, May 2000
- The Mexican Social Security Counter reform: Pensions for Profit, published in the International Journal of Health Services, March 1999
- For a new welfare state in Latin America, published in Lua Nova Revista de Cultura e Política, November 1997
- Market Commodities and Poor Relief: The World Bank Proposal for Health, published in the International Journal of Health Services, January 1996
