= UAM Xochimilco =

Universidad Autónoma Metropolitana-Xochimilco
- Type: Public
- Established: November 11, 1974
- Rector: Dr. Fernando De León González
- Students: 20,965 (2013)
- Location: Mexico City; 19°18′11″N 99°06′07″W
- Colors: Blue
- Nickname: Panteras Negras (Black Panthers)
- Website: www.xoc.uam.mx

UAM Xochimilco is one of the five academic units of the Universidad Autónoma Metropolitana in Mexico City. UAM Xochimilco is located in the southern portion of the city and was founded on November 11, 1974. It offers 18 undergraduate degrees.

== History ==
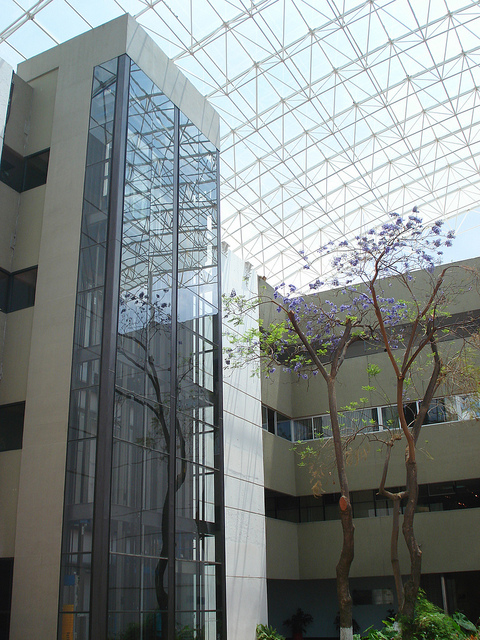
The central courtyard of the UAM-X Rectory Building

UAM Xochimilco began operations on November 11, 1974.

The Unidad Xochimilco is also home to one of the five transmitters of UAM Radio.

== Notable people ==
- Tessy María López Goerne (born 1961), nanotechnologist and academic
- Asa Cristina Laurell (born 1943), former Mexican Under Secretary of Health
