= UAM Iztapalapa =

Universidad Autónoma Metropolitana-Iztapalapa
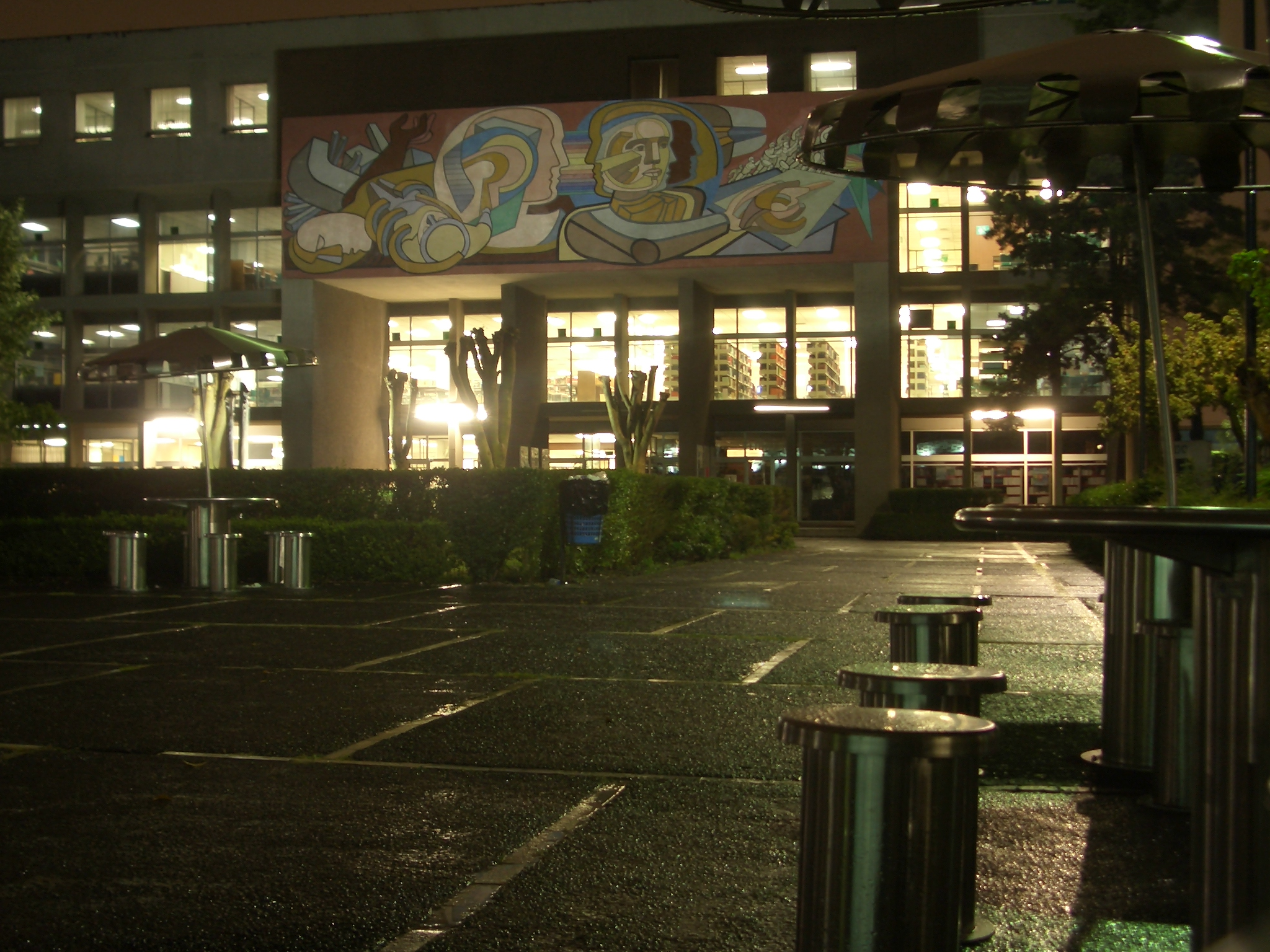
- Type: Public
- Established: September 30, 1974
- Rector: Dra. Verónica Medina Bañuelos
- Students: 16,931 (2013)
- Location: Mexico City; 19°21′41″N 99°04′22″W
- Colors: Green
- Nickname: Panteras Negras (Black Panthers)

UAM Iztapalapa is one of the five academic units of the Universidad Autónoma Metropolitana in Mexico City. UAM Iztapalapa is located in the eastern portion of the city and was founded on September 30, 1974. It offers 26 undergraduate and 27 graduate degrees.

== History ==
The UAM Iztapalapa began operations on September 30, 1974. Alonso Fernández González was the first rector.

=== Physical plant ===
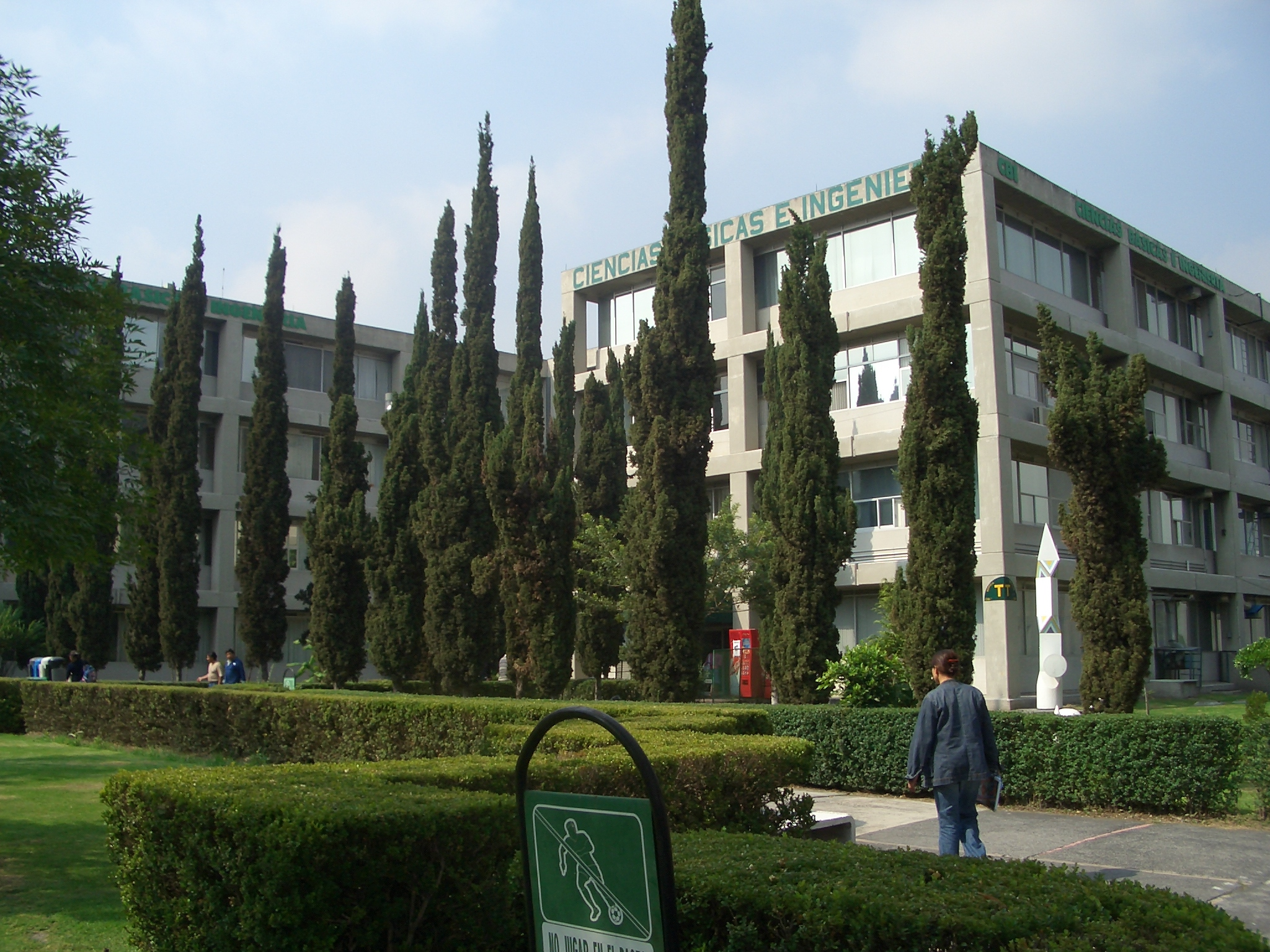
The Basic Sciences and Engineering Building (T)

UAM Iztapalapa was the first unit of the university to begin construction, which was planned in six phases. The first and second phases included classroom buildings C and D, rectory building A, and laboratory building R. The third phase, built in 1975, added the H building for social sciences and humanities; the fourth phase added the health sciences building S and maintenance building Q.

In 1982, construction on phase 5 got underway, adding the Basic Sciences and Engineering building T, classroom building B, library L, storage facilities O and U, and the Sala Cuicacalli (G). This phase alone added 29,000 square metres (310,000 ft^{2}) to the university's built environment. Later in the 1980s came classroom building E and the audiovisual services portion of building C.

The 1990s saw another wave of expansion to the Unidad Iztapalapa, consisting of annexes to the F, H, S and T buildings. In the 2000s, building W was added along with central laboratory building I, which brought the unit's buildings to around 100,000 square metres (1,100,000 ft^{2}) of space.

The Unidad Iztapalapa is also home to one of the five transmitters of UAM Radio.
