= UAM Azcapotzalco =

Universidad Autónoma Metropolitana-Azcapotzalco
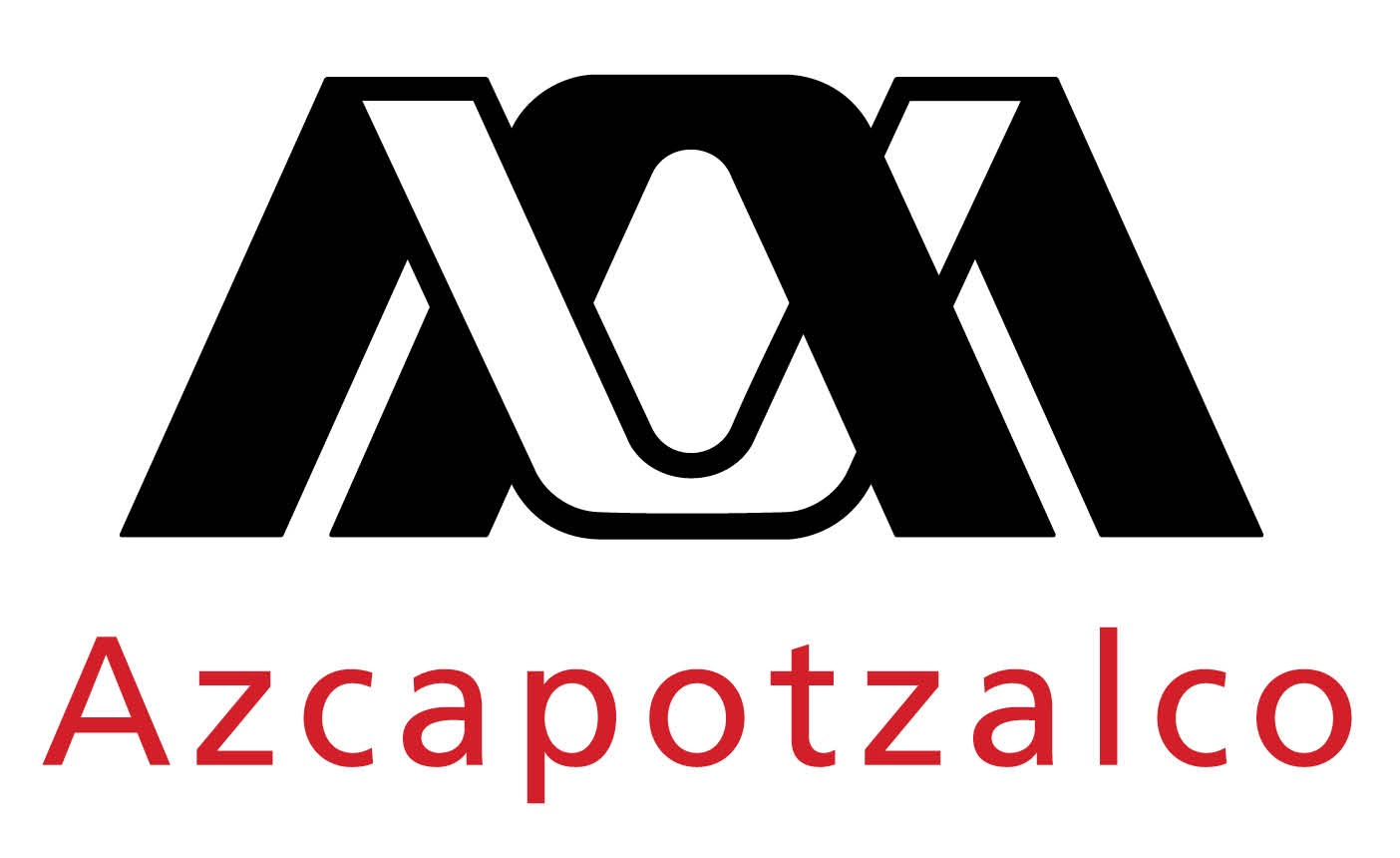
- Motto: "Casa Abierta al Tiempo"
- Type: Public federal
- Established: November 11, 1974
- President: Dr. Eduardo Peñalosa Castro
- Rector: Dra. Yadira Zavala Osorio
- Students: 15,475 (2016)
- Undergraduates: 14,923 (2016)
- Postgraduates: 552 (2016)
- Location: Mexico City; 19°30′11″N 99°11′13″W
- Colors: Red
- Nickname: UAM-A
- Mascot: Panteras Negras (Black Panthers)
- Website: www.azc.uam.mx

UAM Azcapotzalco is one of the five campus of the Universidad Autónoma Metropolitana system, the second best ranked Mexican public university for the year 2018, according to Times Higher Education. This campus is in the northern area of Mexico City, in the borough of Azcapotzalco. It is one of the three campus built shortly after Mexican President Luis Echeverría decreed the foundation of Universidad Autónoma Metropolitana in 1974.

== History ==
The creation of Universidad Autónoma Metropolitana was a response to the increasing demand for public higher education in the metropolitan area of Mexico City, which by those years was undergoing severe demographic changes due to a process of conurbation that started in the early 1940s. The main idea was to cope with the demand for this service throughout the outskirts of the metropolitan area, locating the university's campus in the outlying boroughs. Following this principle, UAM Azcapotzalco was one of the first three campus built between 1974 and 1975, along with UAM Xochimilco and UAM Iztapalapa.

In 1991 the cultural center and administration building was opened, designed by architect José Luis Benlliure Galán.

== Undergraduate studies ==
UAM Azcapotzalco hosts 17 majors, lasting between 12 and 15 quarter-terms or four and five years respectively. These programs are organized in three academic divisions as follows:

=== Basic Sciences and Engineering Division ===
- Environmental Engineering
- Civil Engineering
- Computer Engineering
- Electrical Engineering
- Electronics Engineering
- Engineering Physics
- Industrial Engineering
- Mechanical Engineering
- Metallurgic Engineering
- Chemical Engineering

=== Social Sciences and Humanities Division ===
- Management
- Law
- Economics
- Sociology

=== Design Sciences and Arts Division ===
- Architecture
- Visual Communication Design
- Industrial Design

== Graduate studies ==
As of 2017, UAM Azcapotzalco offers 22 graduate programs. They are divided as follows:

=== Basic Sciences and Engineering Division ===
- MSc in Computer Science
- Graduate Studies in Science and Engineering: Specialization, MSc and PhD with Environmental or Materials sciences applications
- MSc/PhD in Structural Engineering
- MSc/PhD in Process Engineering
- MSc/PhD in Optimization

=== Social Sciences and Humanities Division ===
- Specialization in Mexican Literature of the 20th century
- Specialization in Higher Education Sociology
- MA in Law
- MSc in Economics
- MA in Contemporary Mexican Literature
- MSc in Metropolitan Planning and Policies
- Graduate Studies in Historiography: Specialization, MA and PhD
- MSc/PhD in Economic Sciences
- MA/PhD in Sociology
- Graduate Studies in Historiography
- Graduate Studies in Managerial Sciences

=== Design Sciences and Arts Division ===
- Graduate Studies in Ecological Design
- Graduate Studies in Urbanism
- Graduate Studies in Product Design and Development
- Graduate Studies in Information Design and Visualization
- Graduate Studies in Landscape Design, Planning and Conservation
- Graduate Studies in Rehabilitation, Restoration and Conservation of Tangible Heritage

== Notable people ==
=== Faculty ===
- Celso Garrido Noguera, founding member of CLACSO's (Latin American Council of Social Sciences) "Entrepreneurs and State in Latin America" project and CEPAL collaborator
- Edmundo Jacobo Molina, executive secretary of the Federal Electoral Institute (IFE) since 2008
- Rosa Albina Garavito Elías, Mexican politician
- Lucia Tomasini Bassols, notable translator and foreign language teaching specialist

=== Alumni ===
- Rafael Tovar y de Teresa, diplomat, lawyer and historian. Served as Ambassador of Mexico in Italy from 2001 to 2007, was president of CONACULTA from 1992 to 2000.
- Pablo Moctezuma Barragán, politician, writer and scholar
- Francisco Alfonso Durazo Montaño, spokesperson for Mexican President Vicente Fox Quesada
- Rubén Albarrán, musician, frontman of rock band Café Tacvba
- Jesús Humberto Ramos Rosario, The Spectacular Spider-Man illustrator
- Arturo Sánchez Gutiérrez, sociologist and counselor of the Federal Electoral Institute (2003- )
