= UAM Cuajimalpa =

Coordinates: 19.35208°N 99.28262°W

Universidad Autónoma Metropolitana-Cuajimalpa
- Type: Public
- Established: 2005
- Founders: Magdalena Fresán Orozco
- President: Salvador Vega y León (2013-2017)
- Rector: Eduardo Peñalosa Castro
- Location: Mexico City
- Colors: Orange
- Nickname: Panteras Negras (Black Panthers)
- Website: www.cua.uam.mx

UAM Cuajimalpa is the fourth of the five campuses of the Universidad Autónoma Metropolitana (UAM). It is located in the western part of Mexico City. It was created in 2005 to respond to the high demand of a high quality public higher education in that part of Mexico City. Currently is located in Avenida Prolongación Vasco de Quiroga 4871, colonia Santa Fe Cuajimalpa, Delegación Cuajimalpa de Morelos, México, Distrito Federal, C.P. 05300. It had three temporary locations until December 2013, one in Delegación Álvaro Obregón (Campus Artificios), and the others in Delegación Miguel Hidalgo (Campus Constituyentes 647 and 1054). The university occupied his definitive campus on January 6, 2014 in the area of Santa Fe, where all the activities of UAM Cuajimalpa take place. The academic activities are organized in three main areas, called divisions:

- Social Science and Humanities
- Communication, Information Technology and Design
- Natural Science, Computer Science, Mathematics and Engineering

It is the only university in Mexico where more than 90% of the academics have a PhD. Its educational model is composed of the following elements: philosophic, social, theoric, and political. Its objective is to give a high quality humanistic education focused on an inter-disciplinary formation, being flexible and with connection to the social dynamics and needs of Mexico and the world. As in the other campuses of the UAM, the programs are structured by trimesters which are:

- Autumn (September–December)
- Winter (January–March)
- Spring (April–July)

All its undergraduate programs contain a trimester mandatory for mobility to another campus of UAM, or another university. Currently, UAM Cuajimalpa offers the following degrees:

- Communication Sciences
- Design
- Technologies and Information Systems
- Biological Engineering
- Molecular Biology
- Applied Mathematics
- Computer Engineering
- Management
- Law
- Humanistic Studies
- Socio-territorial Studies

And also three Ph. D. degrees on

- Biological Science
- Informatics, Design and Communications (MADIC)
- Social Sciences and Humanities
