= Universidad Autónoma Metropolitana =

University in Mexico

Metropolitan Autonomous University
- Universidad Autónoma Metropolitana
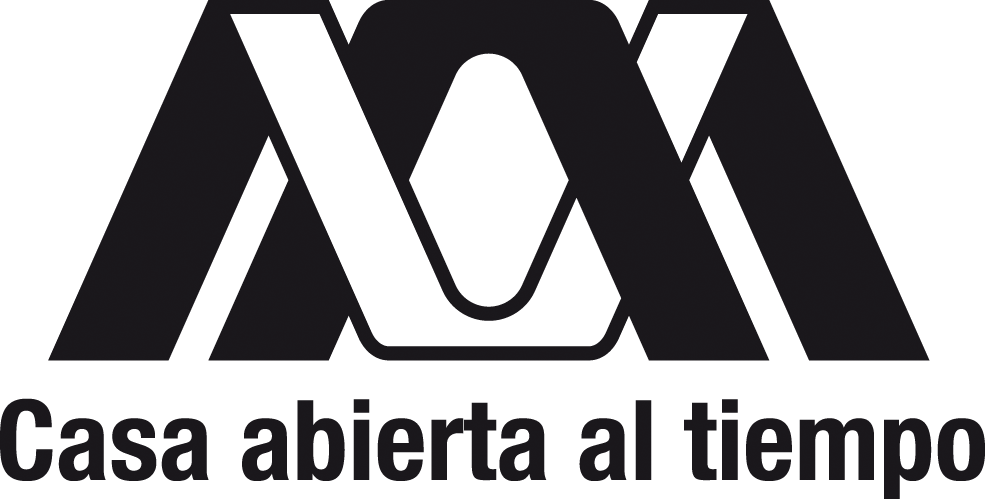
- Motto: In Calli Ixcahuicopa (Es:Casa abierta al tiempo)
- Motto in English: "House open to time"
- Type: Public research university
- Established: 1 January 1974
- Founder: Luis Echeverría Álvarez
- Affiliations: ANUIES CONAHEC
- Endowment: $500 million
- Rector: José Antonio De Los Reyes Heredia
- Academic staff: 2,862 (as of 2022)
- Students: 61,908 (as of 2022)
- Undergraduates: 58,062 (as of 2022)
- Postgraduates: 3,846 (as of 2022)
- Location: Mexico City, Mexico; 19.2867°N 99.1369°W
- Campus: 4 academic units in Mexico City, 1 academic unit in the State of Mexico
- Colors: Black (UAM); Red (Unidad Azcapotzalco); Orange (Unidad Cuajimalpa); Green (Unidad Iztapalapa); Purple (Unidad Lerma); Blue (Unidad Xochimilco)
- Nickname: Panteras negras
- Mascots: Oncahui, UAMito, Xochito
- Website: http://www.uam.mx

The Metropolitan Autonomous University (Spanish: Universidad Autónoma Metropolitana) also known as UAM, is a Mexican public research university. Founded in 1974 with the support of then-President Luis Echeverria Alvarez, the institution aims to be closely linked to the environment.

As an autonomous university, UAM is a public agency of the Mexican government. (Note: Article 3 of the Organic Law of the UAM https://www.diputados.gob.mx/LeyesBiblio/pdf/157.pdf) It has five academic units located in Mexico City and Greater Mexico City: Azcapotzalco, in the North, Iztapalapa, in the East, Cuajimalpa, in the West, Xochimilco, in the South, and Lerma in State of Mexico).

The institution is among the top academic universities in Mexico. In 2019, it ranked first among all public and private institutions. According to the Comparative Study of Mexican Universities, the UAM had the second most full-time research professors with doctorates, as well as the second largest number of researchers in the Sistema Nacional de Investigadores (literally National System of Researchers). It is one of the most renowned research institutions in Mexico, and the second institution to have publications in refereed journals, such as the Institute for Scientific Information. It additionally has the fourth most patents granted in Mexico.

== History ==
After the historic 1968 Tlatelolco massacre in Mexico, and other subsequent movements in favor of education and social improvements, the need for comprehensive education reform in Mexico was evident.

In 1973, during the administration of President Luis Echeverria Alvarez, the National Association of Universities and Institutions of Higher Education (ANUIES) presented a document to the President noting the need to establish a new university in the Mexico City's metropolitan area, taking into consideration issues such as increasing student demand and the increasing failure of existing universities to admit more students.

It was then proposed that the nascent university project also constituted an opportunity to modernize higher education in the country. The expected characteristics of the new university were for it to be public, metropolitan, independent, in addition to having innovative educational and organizational terms.

It is under such expectations that the law comes into force for the creation of the Autonomous Metropolitan University, on January 1 1974. On January 10 of that year architect Pedro Ramirez Vazquez was appointed as the first Rector of the UAM.

University rankings

Global – Overall
- QS World: 951-1000 (2026)

The University consisted at the moment of its creation of three units, which are located in Iztapalapa, Azcapotzalco and Xochimilco, with the idea of promoting decentralization and allowing the full development of each. Empirically, scientific research majors were located in Iztapalapa (UAM-I) Unit, the traditional careers such as civil engineering and architecture at the Azcapotzalco (UAM-A) Unit and the area of health in the Xochimilco Unit (UAM -X). Subsequently, it was decided that their internal organization would be composed of Divisions and Academic Departments, creating a contrast with the Schools and Colleges of existing universities. Each Division would group different areas of knowledge and each Academic Department related disciplines, in order to give a flexible structure that prevents the lag that education had suffered in relation to the progress of science.

The first Rector of the Iztapalapa Unit was Dr. Alonso Fernandez González and began operations on September 30, 1974. In turn, the Rector of the Azcapotzalco Unit was Dr. Juan Casillas García de León, which opened its doors on November 11, 1974. For the Xochimilco Unit the first Rector was Dr. Ramon Villarreal Perez, initiating teaching also on November 11, 1974. Recently, the possibility of creating a new unit of the UAM was analyzed.

On April 26, 2005 the Academic College of the institution approved the creation of the Cuajimalpa campus, appointing in June of that year Dr. Fresán Magdalena Orozco as the first Rector. The activities of the Unit officially began on September 14, 2005, using different locations, at first at the Universidad Iberoamericana. Then he took three temporary facilities: Baja California, Artifice and Constituents Constituents adding a fourth in 647. His final location was achieved in 2014 on the grounds of "Scorpio", ancient land of the Zona Especial Forestal y de Repoblación Bosques Industriales La Venta, which had not been built by the lack of legal certainty and the opposition of local people to Ocotal forest development in La Venta, Cuajimalpa.

== Campuses ==
The university system has 5 units, with campuses located in different boroughs of Mexico City and in the adjacent state:

- UAM Azcapotzalco — located in Azcapotzalco, northern Mexico City
- UAM Iztapalapa — located in Iztapalapa, eastern Mexico City
- UAM Cuajimalpa — located in Cuajimalpa, western Mexico City
- UAM Xochimilco — located in Coyoacán, southern Mexico City.
- UAM Lerma — located near Toluca, in the State of Mexico.

=== Main office ===
UAM Rectoría is the main office of the university system. It is located in the south of the city, on Canal de Miramontes street near Xochimilco.

== Organizational Structure ==
Established in articles 6 to 31 of its Organic Law it follows a model based on College Organs, Academic Units, Divisions and Academic Departments, each with different powers and obligations.

Each of the 5 Academic Units has an individual organization chart, with a Unit Rector as well as a General Rector for the entire institution.

=== Rectors ===
General Rectors of the Universidad Autónoma Metropolitana
Rector	Period
Pedro Ramírez Vázquez	1974 - 1975
Juan Casillas García de León	1975 - 1979
Fernando Salmerón Roiz	1979 - 1981
Sergio Reyes Luján	1981 - 1985
Oscar Manuel González Cuevas	1985 - 1989
Gustavo A. Chapela Castañares	1989 - 1993
Julio Rubio Oca	1993 - 1997
José Luis Gázquez Mateos	1997 - 2001
Luis Mier y Terán Casanueva	2001 - 2005
José Lema Labadie	2005 - 2009
Enrique Fernández Fassnacht	2009 - 2013
Salvador Vega y León	2013 - 2017
Eduardo Abel Peñalosa Castro	2017 - 2021
José Antonio de los Reyes Heredia	2021 - 2025
Gustavo Pacheco López	2025 - 2029

== Gallery ==
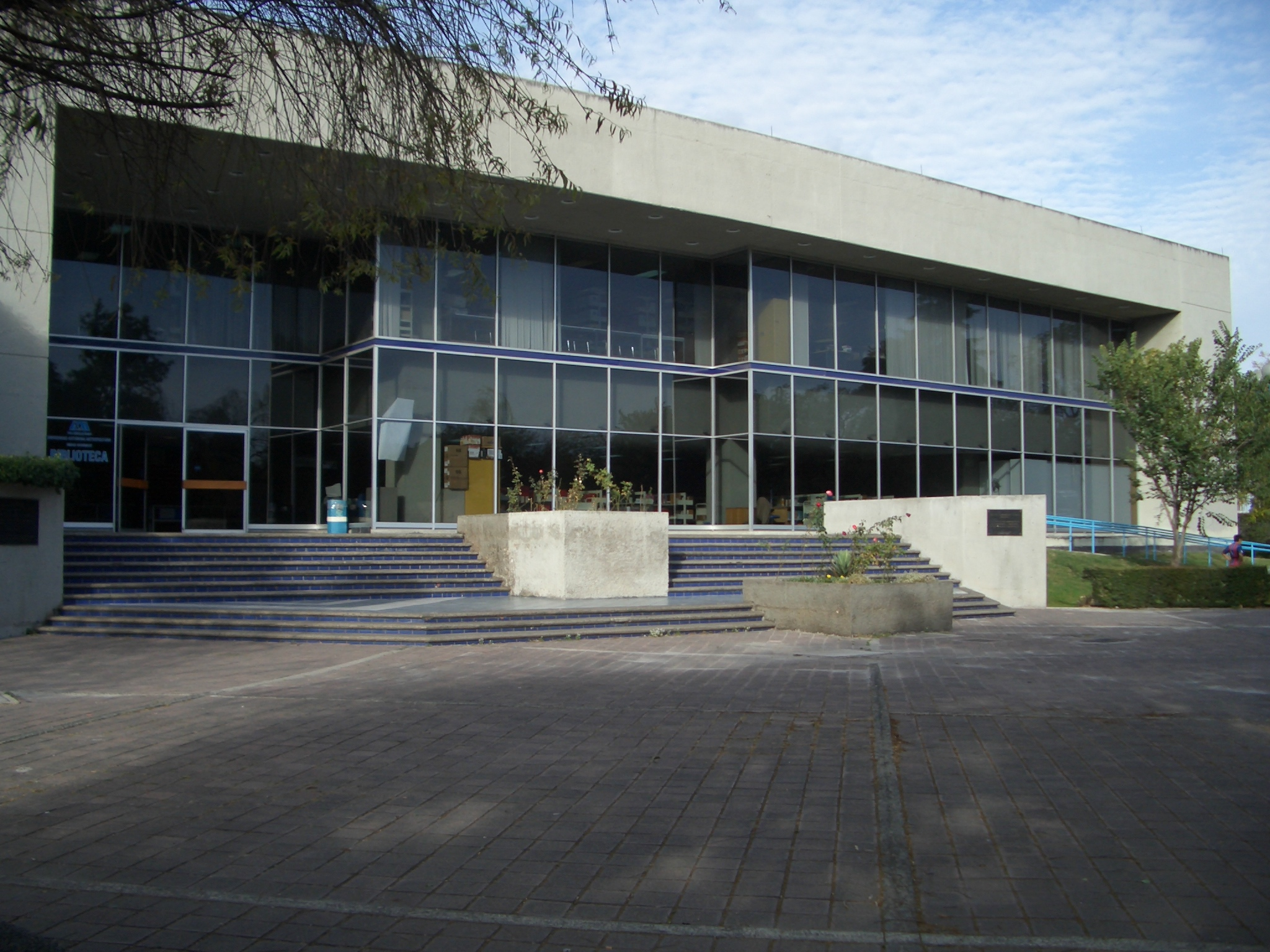
UAM Xochimilco

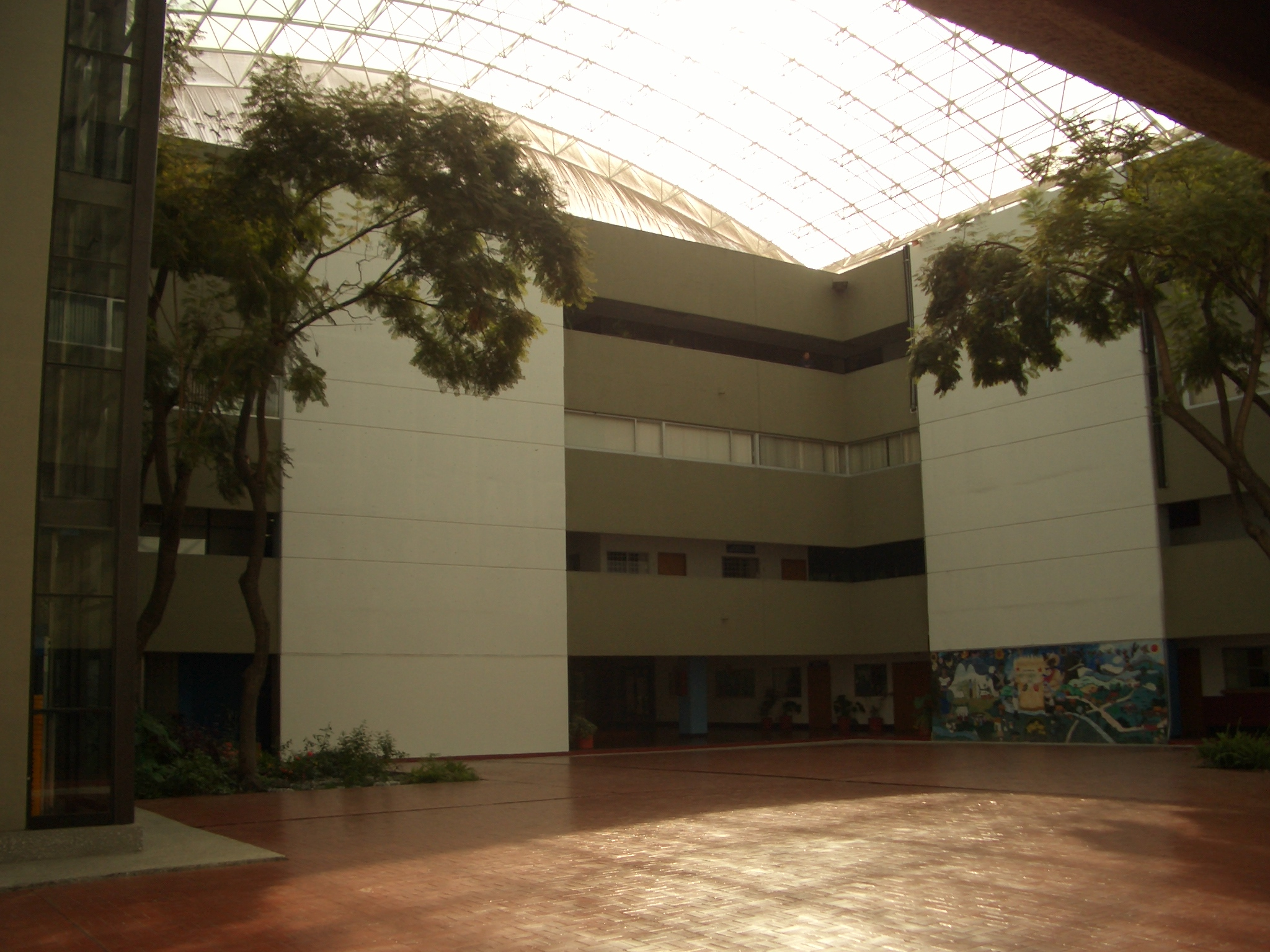
UAM Rectoría

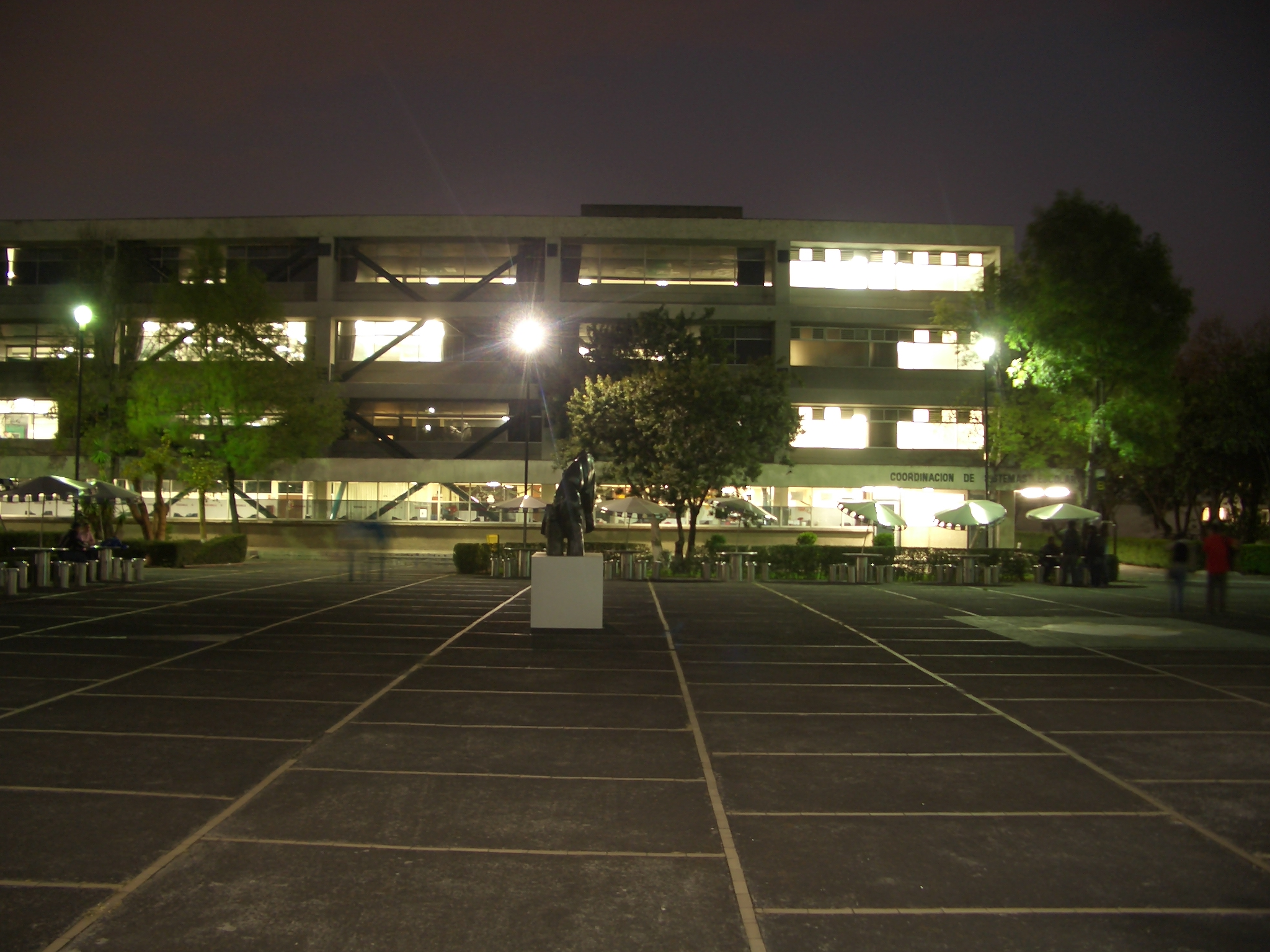
UAM Iztapalapa

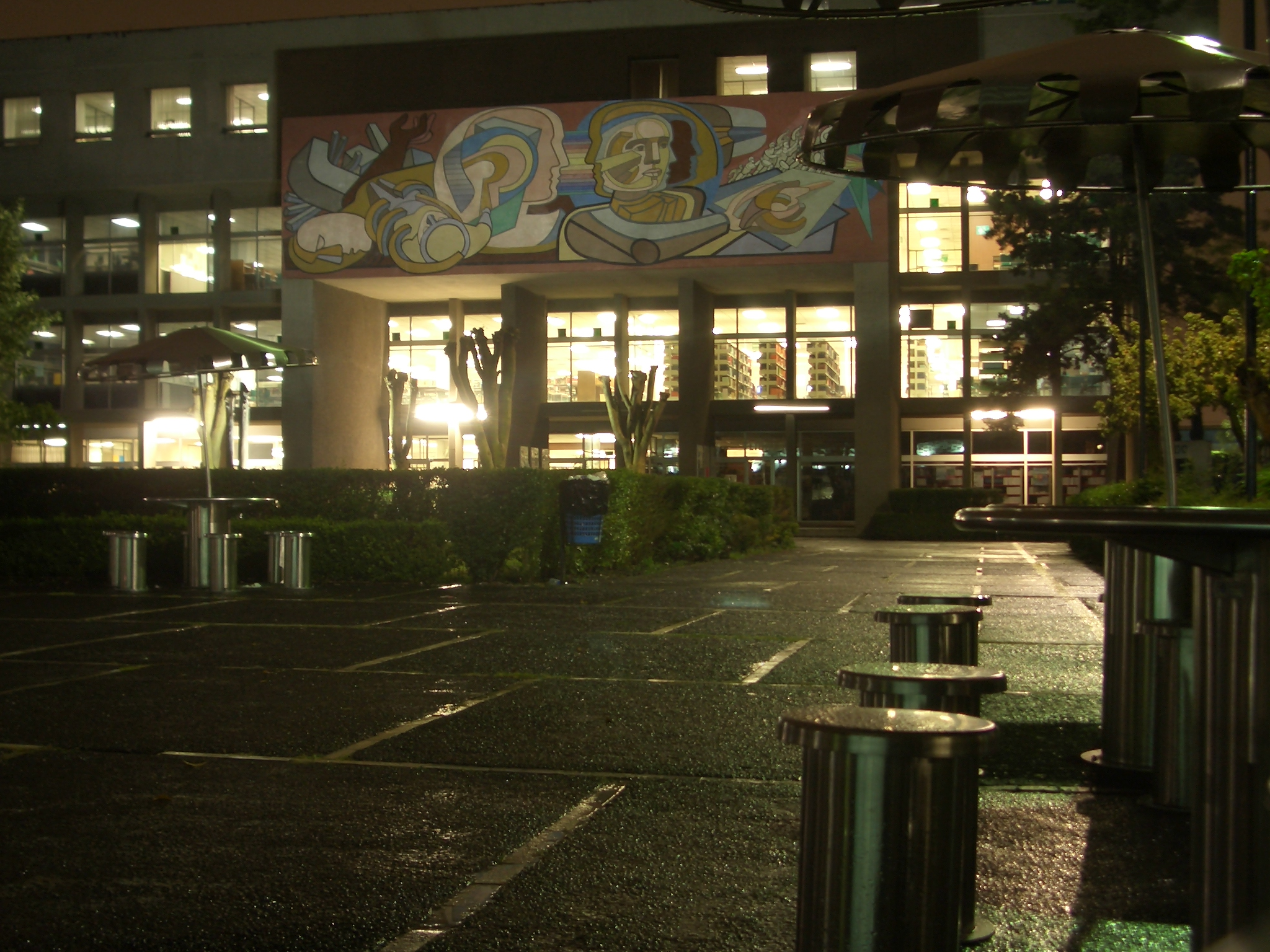
UAM Iztapalapa

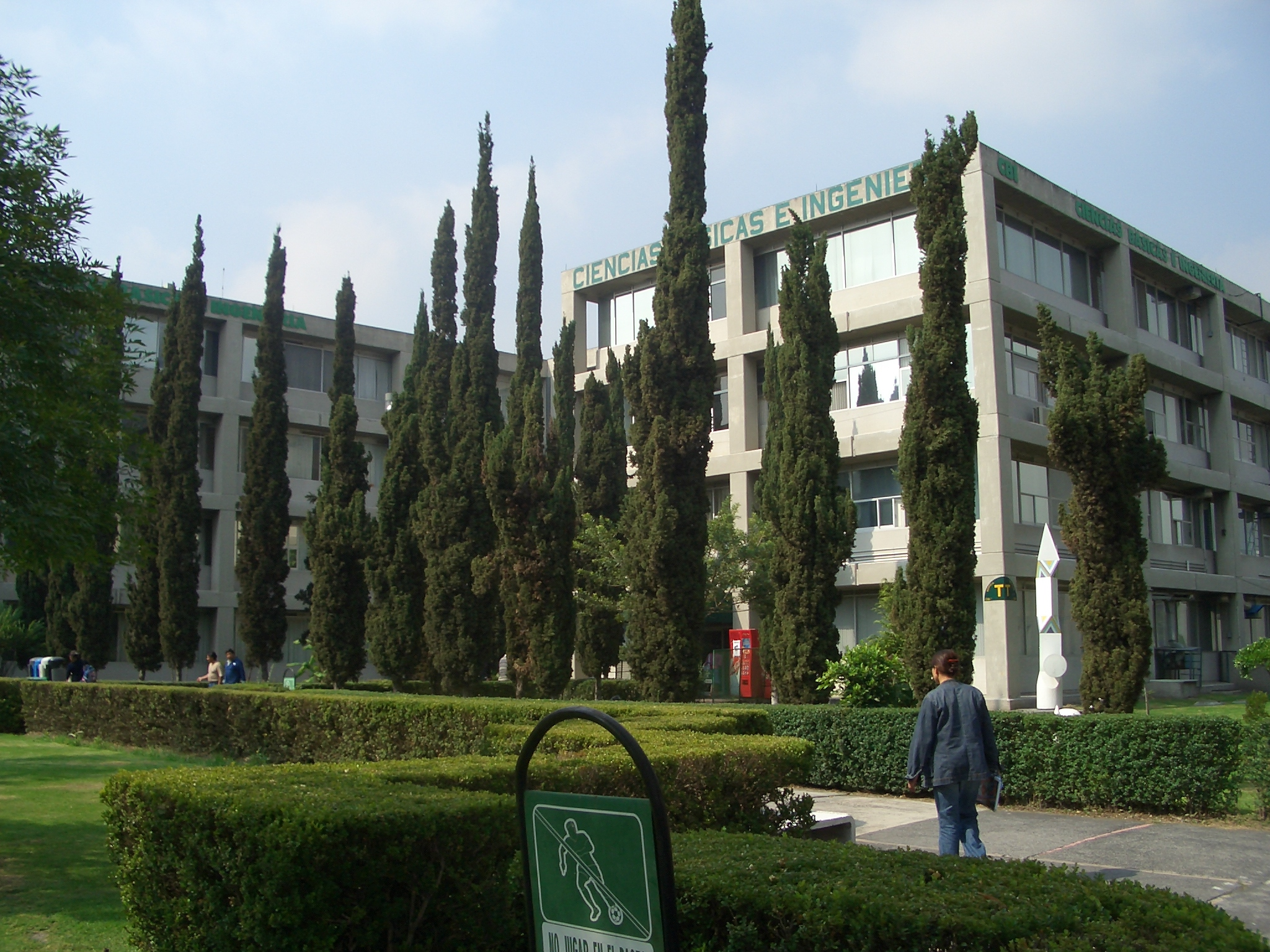
UAM Iztapalapa

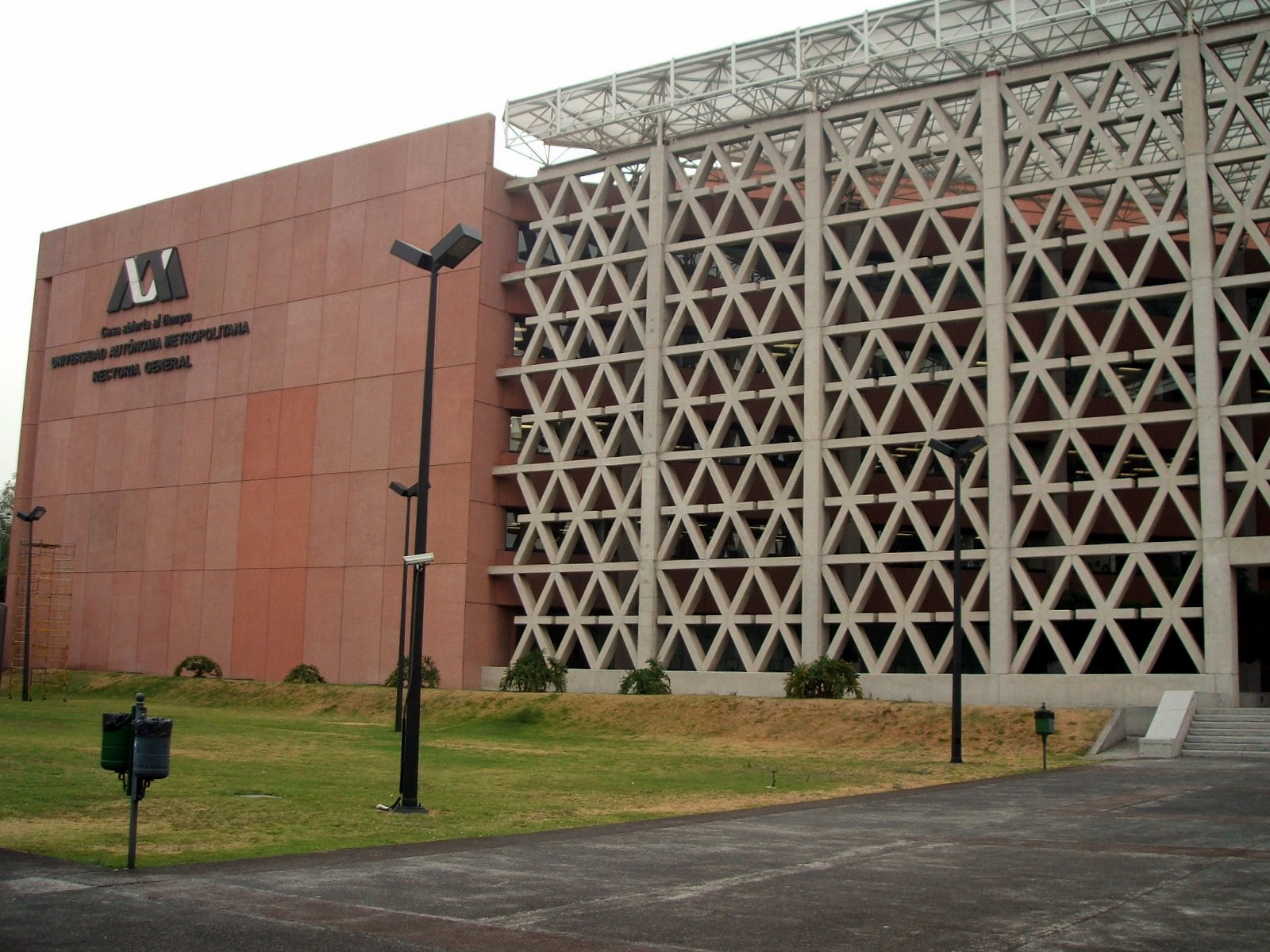
UAM Rectoría

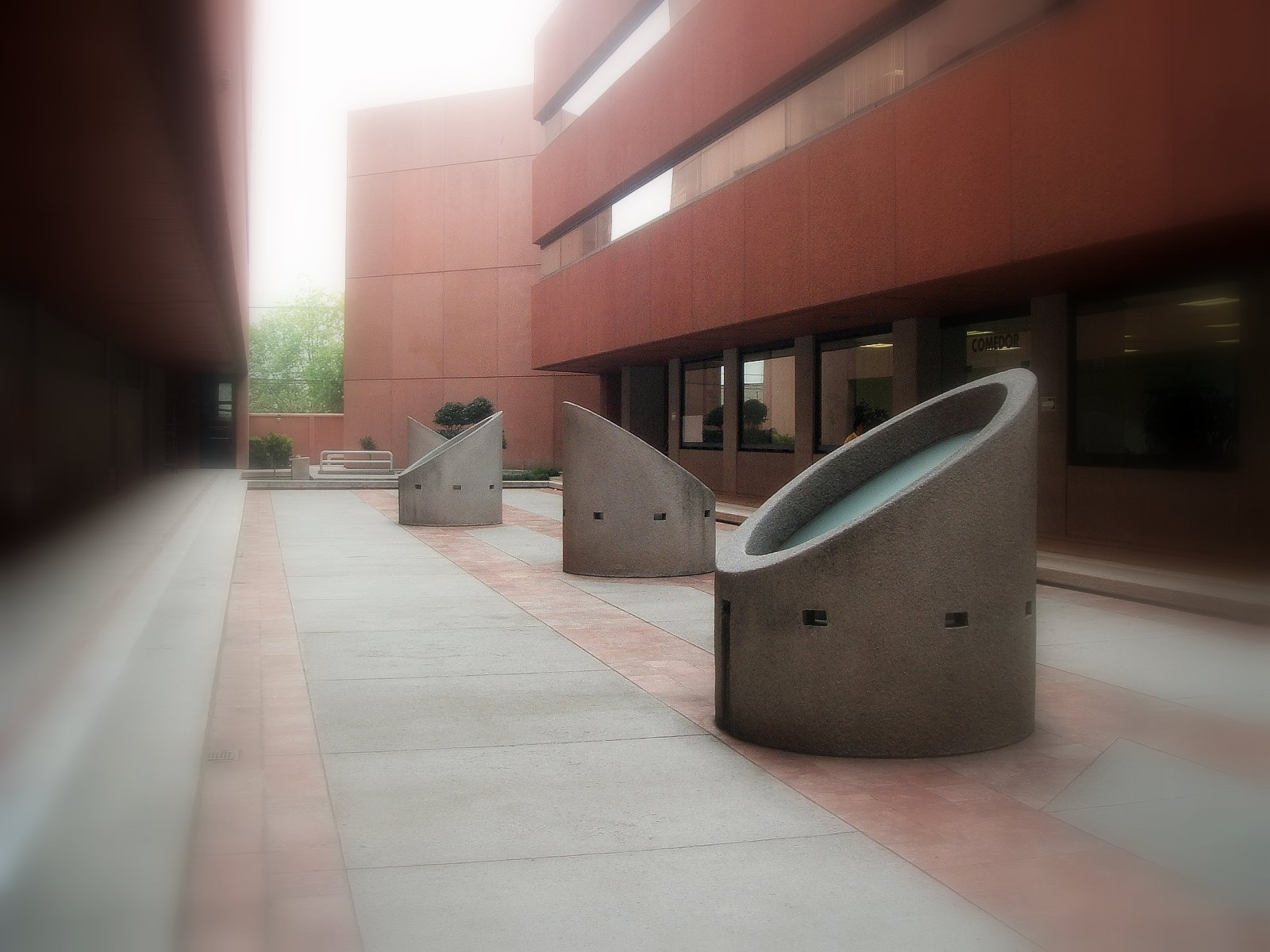
UAM Rectoría

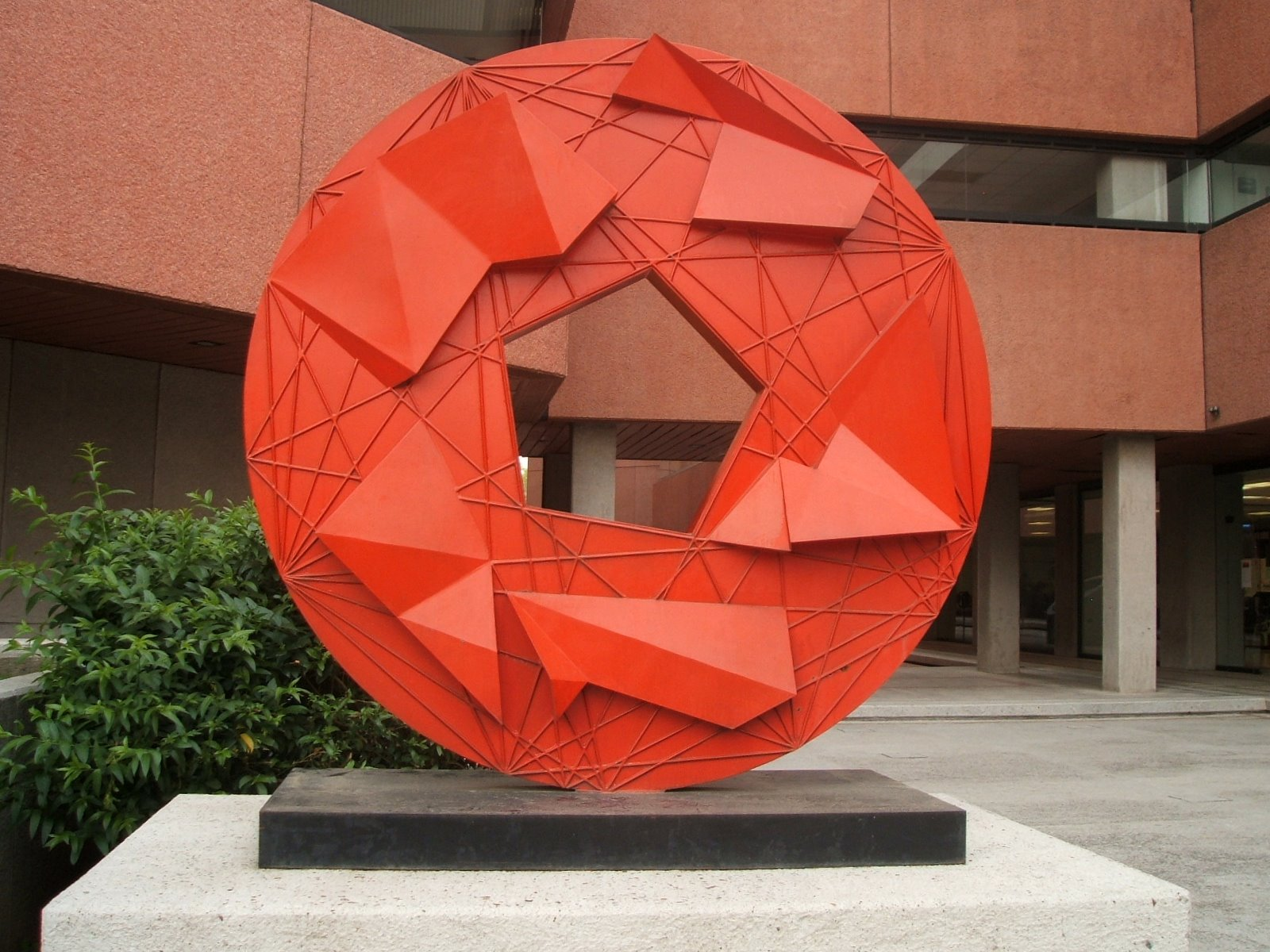
UAM Rectoría

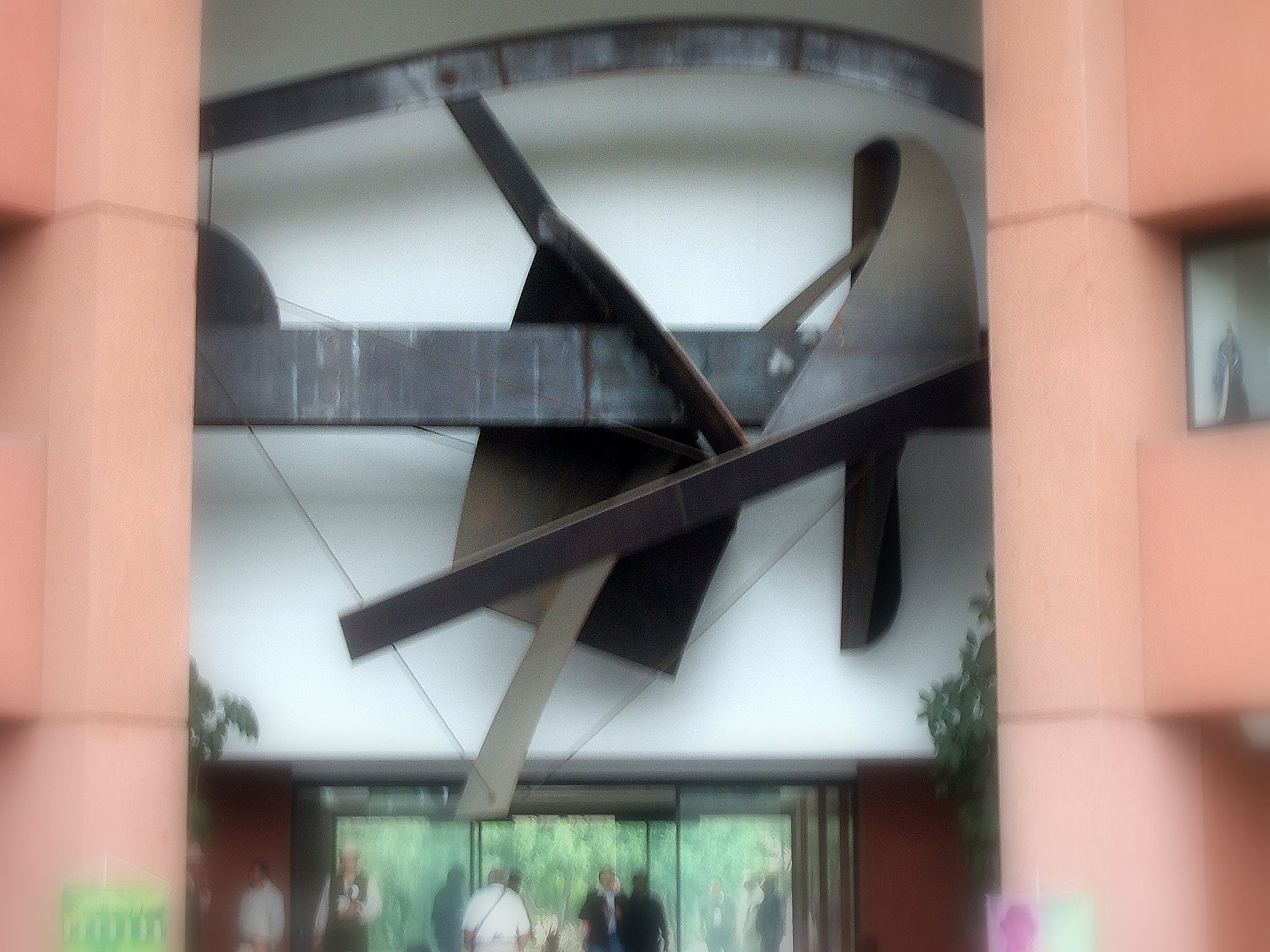

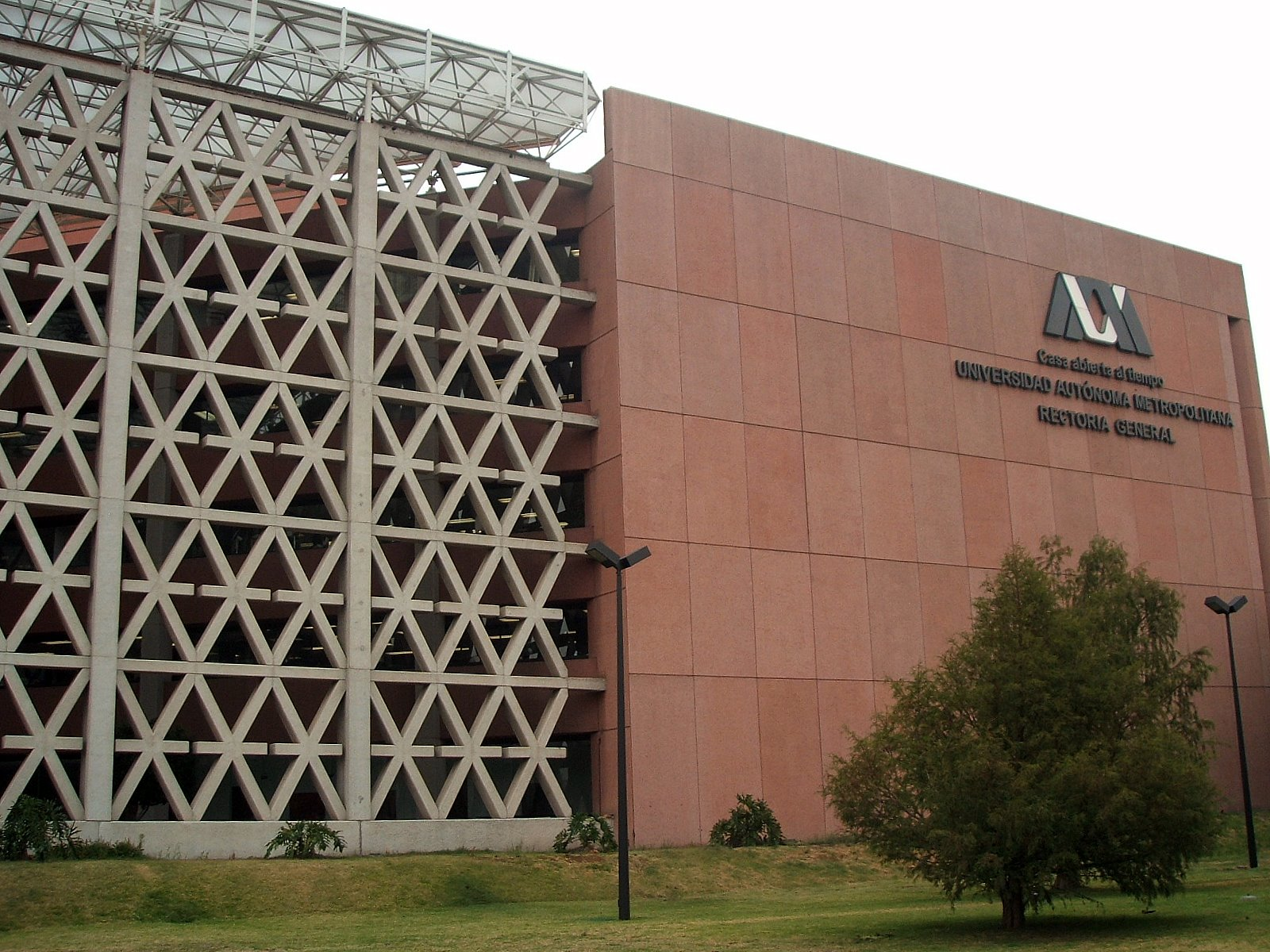
UAM Rectoría

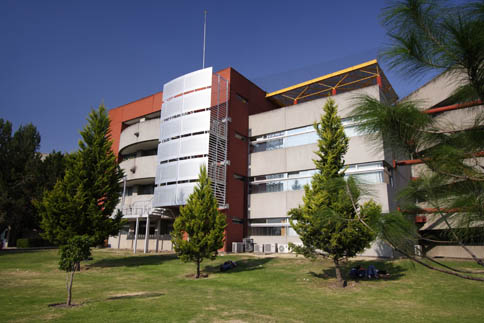
Unit Azcapotzalco

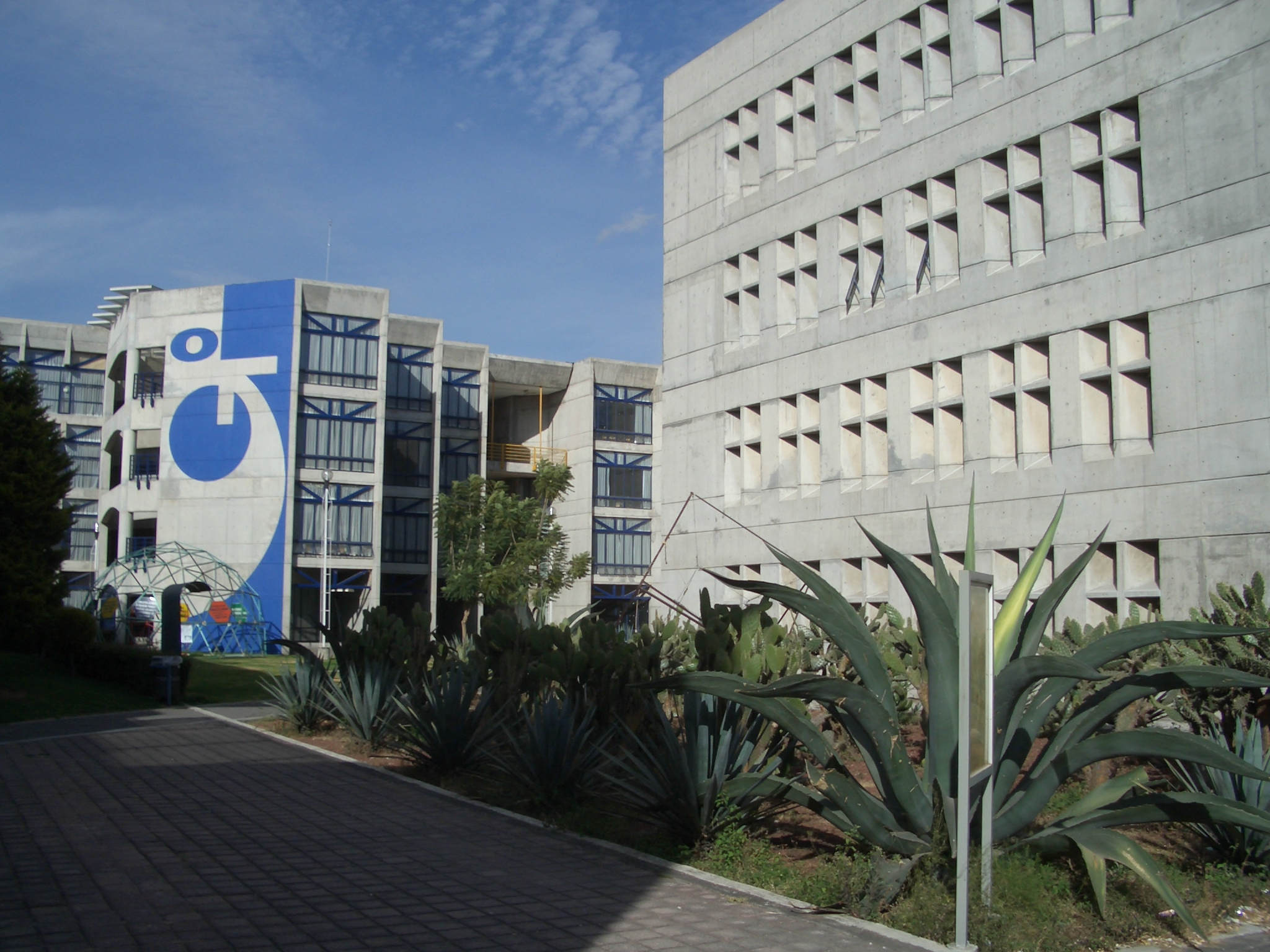
Unit Xochimilco

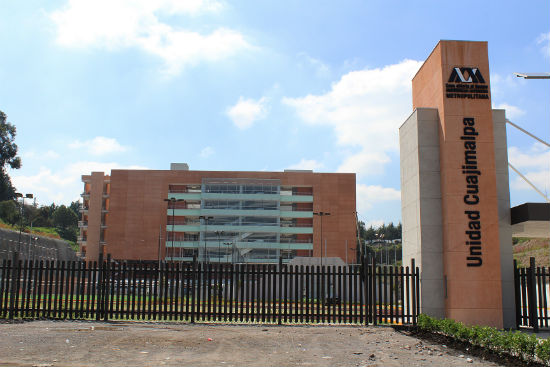
Unit Cuajimalpa

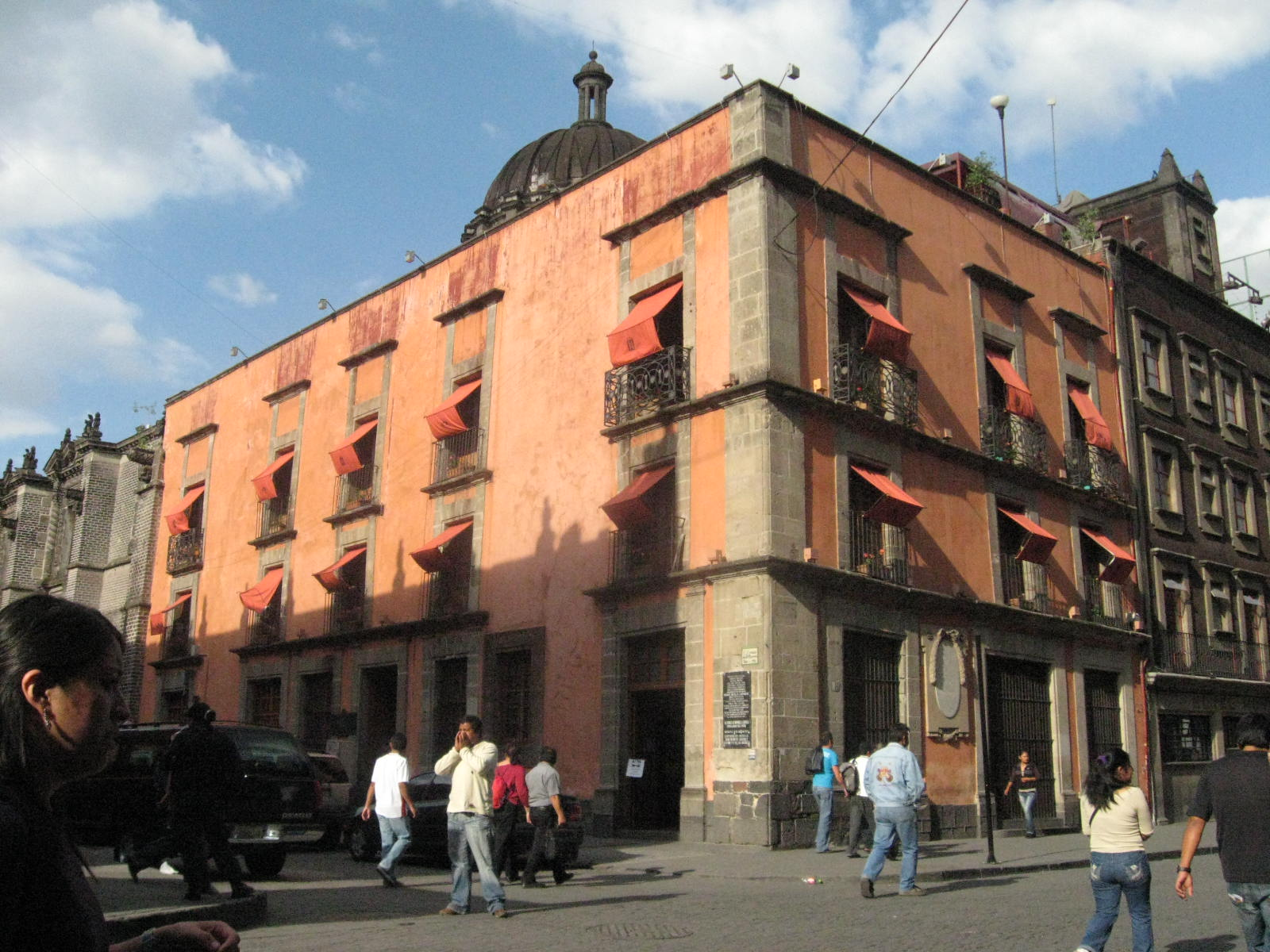
House of the First Print Shop in the Americas in historic Centro district of Mexico City, now the Continuing Education Center of UAM.
