= Miguel Verdiguier =

French sculptor

- Born: 1796; Marseille, France
- Died: 1796 (aged -1–0); Córdoba, Andalusia, Spain
- Occupation: Sculptor

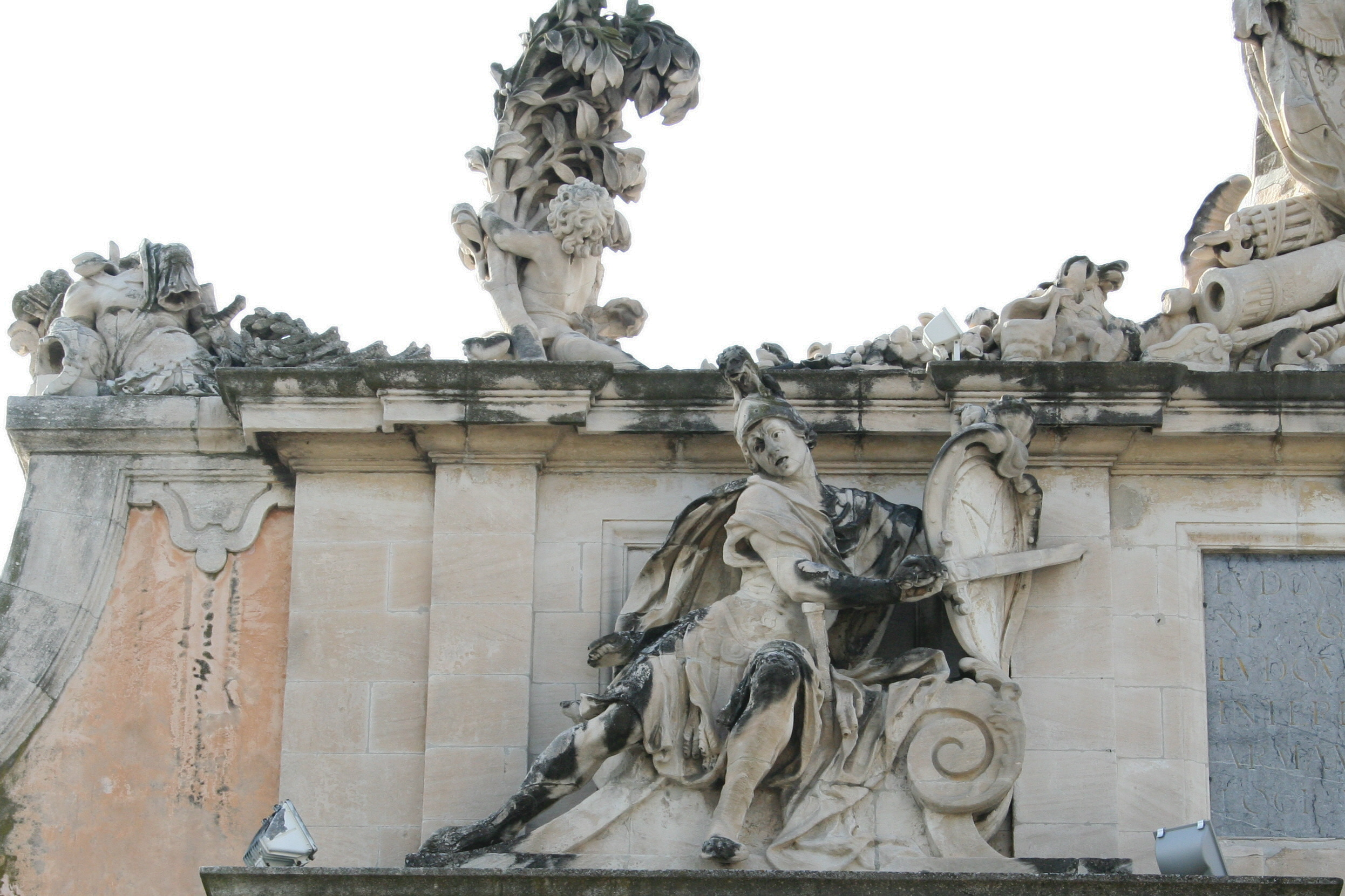
Old door of the Toulon arsenal, now the Marine Museum

Miguel Verdiguier (1706 – 29 December 1796) was a French sculptor who spent much of his career in Spain.

== Biography ==
Miguel Verdiguier was born in Marseille in 1706. He became a director of the Marseille Academy of Statutory, and later became an academic of merit at the San Fernando Academy of Fine Arts in Madrid.

In 1765 the Cathedral Chapter of Córdoba commissioned him to construct a monument to the Archangel San Rafael next to the Puerta del Puente. He also made Churrigueresque pulpits for the Cordoba Cathedral, and the Museum of Fine Arts of Cordoba also preserves some of his work. He made all the outdoor sculptures for the facade of the Sanctuary of the Cathedral of Jaen. In 1780, working with his son, he made the reliefs of the facade of the chapel of S. Cecilio for the Granada Cathedral in 1780. He made a sculpture of the Entombment of Christ for the city of Lucena. Verdiguier died in Cordoba in 1796.

One of his pupils, José Álvarez Cubero (23 April 1768 - 26 November 1827), became famous for his works in the neoclassical style.

== Gallery ==
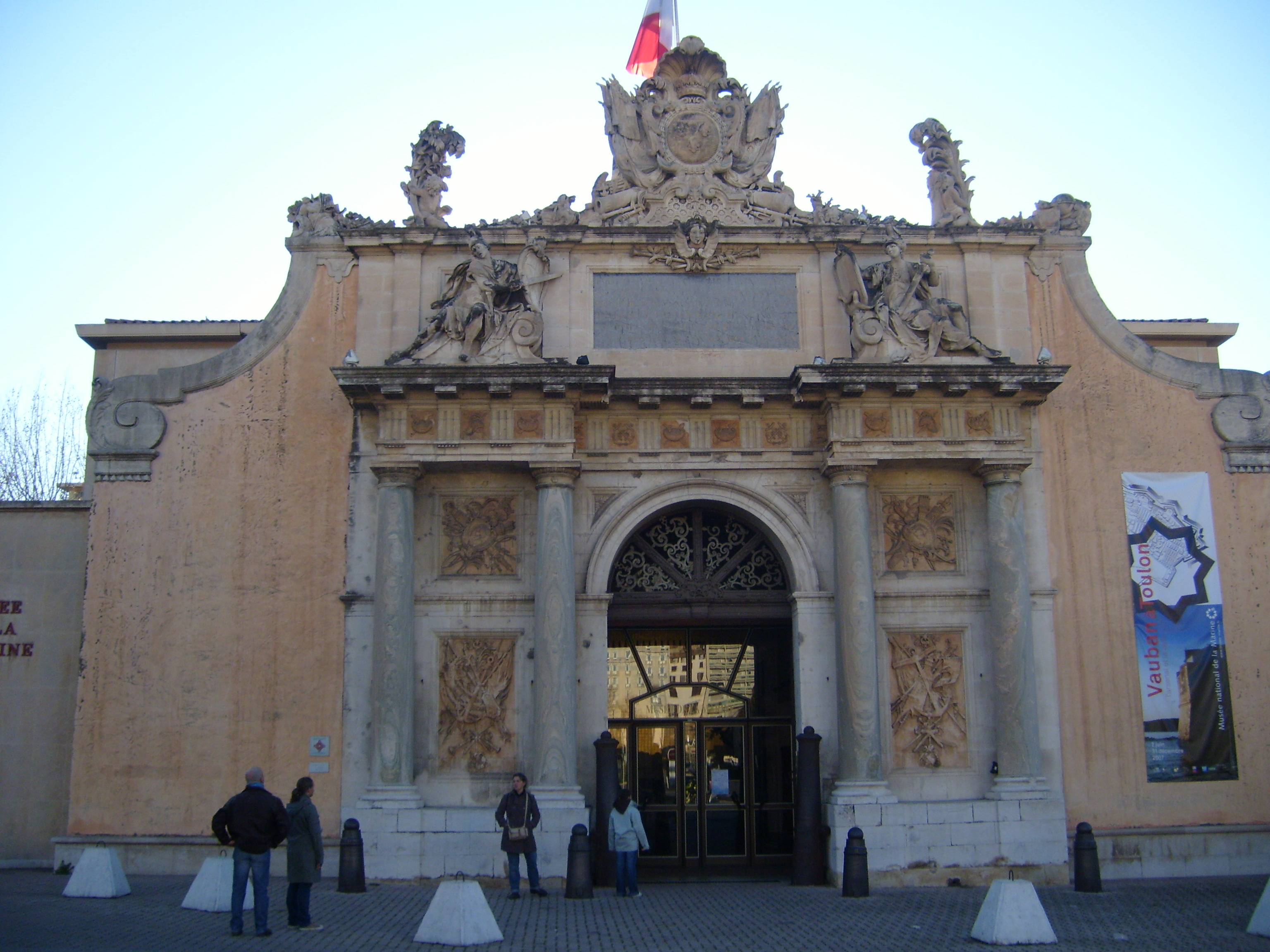
Toulon Naval Museum. Sculptures de Jean-Michel Verdiguier

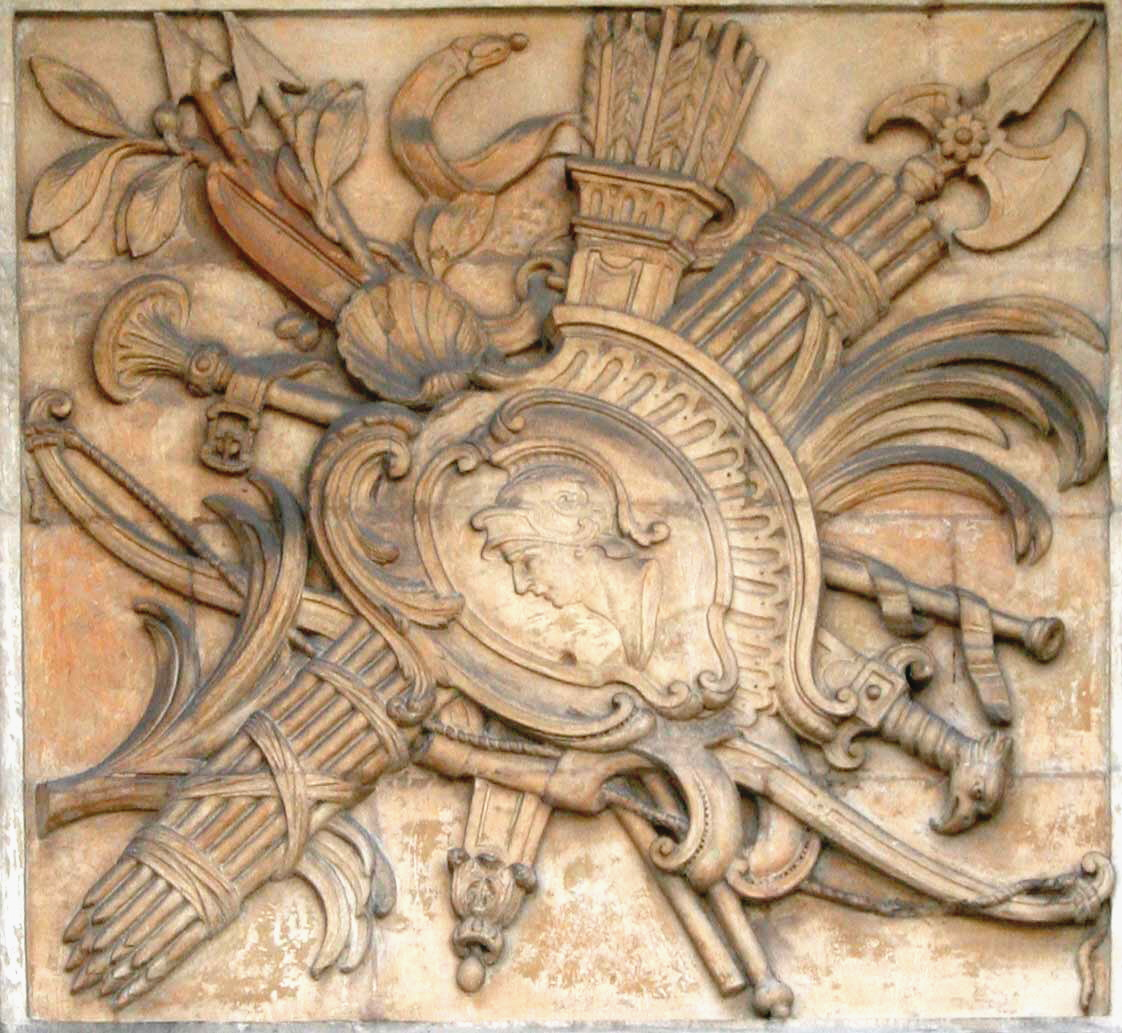
Detail - door of the arsenal of Toulon

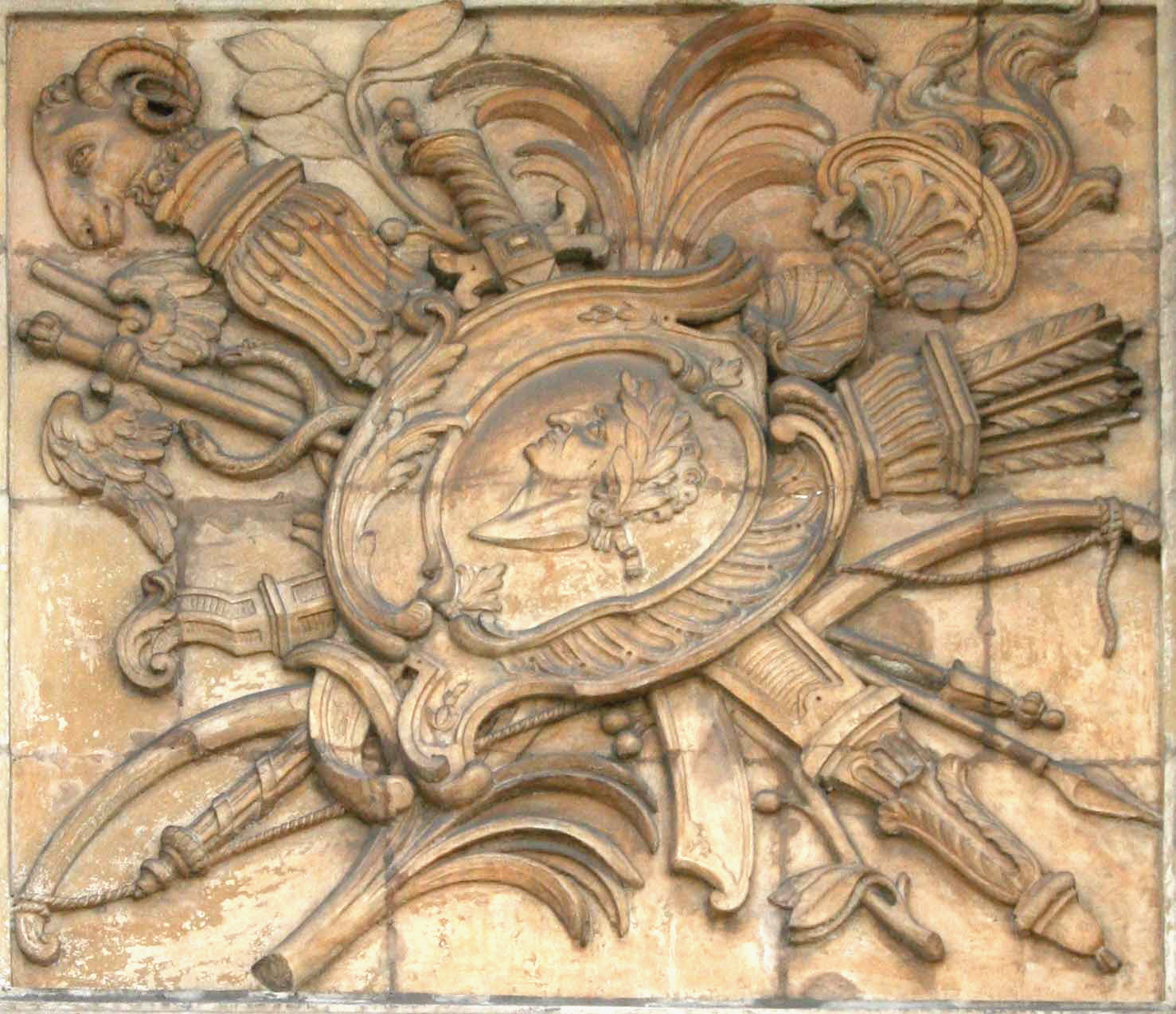
Detail - door of the arsenal of Toulon

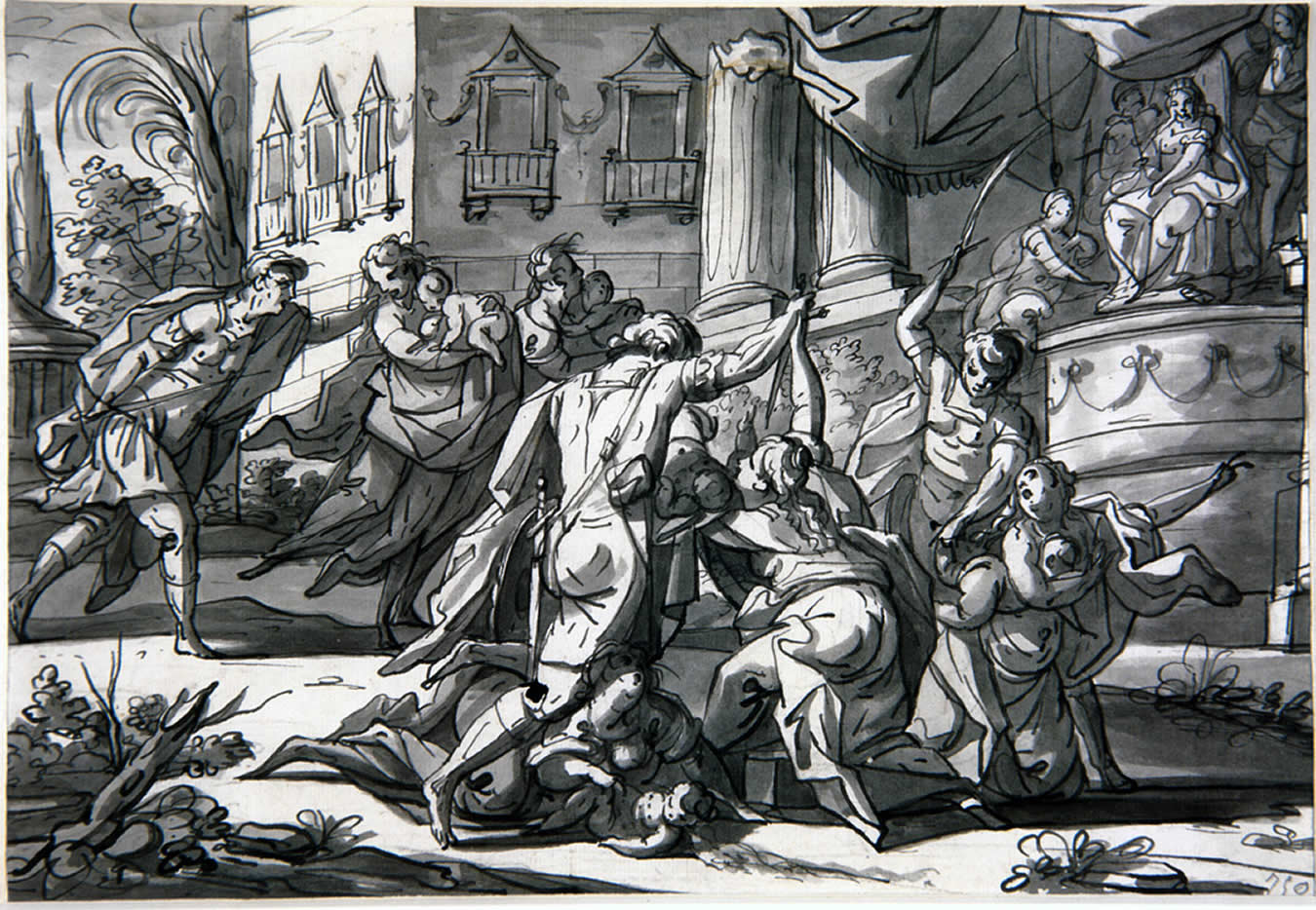
Massacre of the innocents
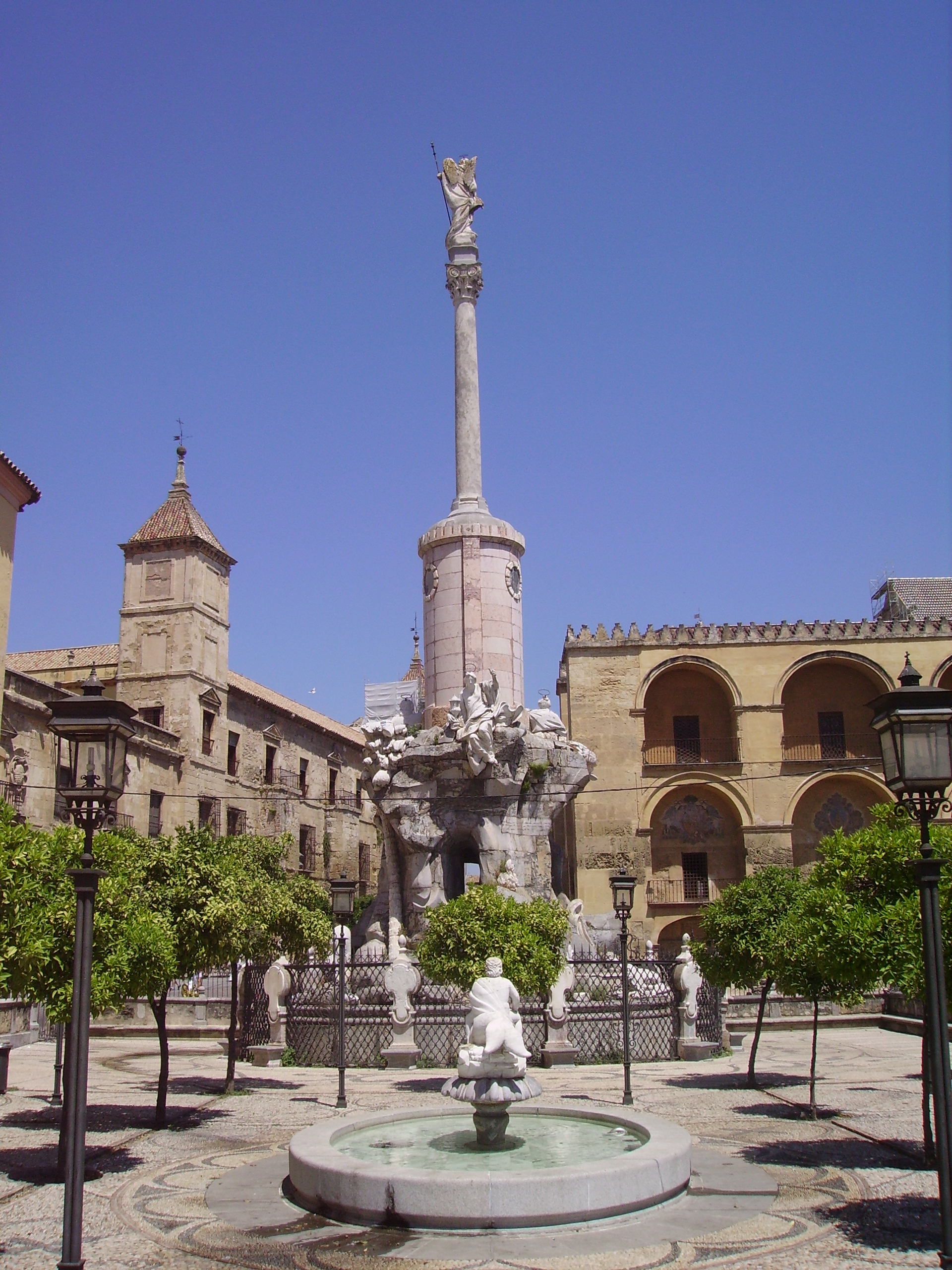
Triumph of St. Rafael, Puerta del Puente, Córdoba

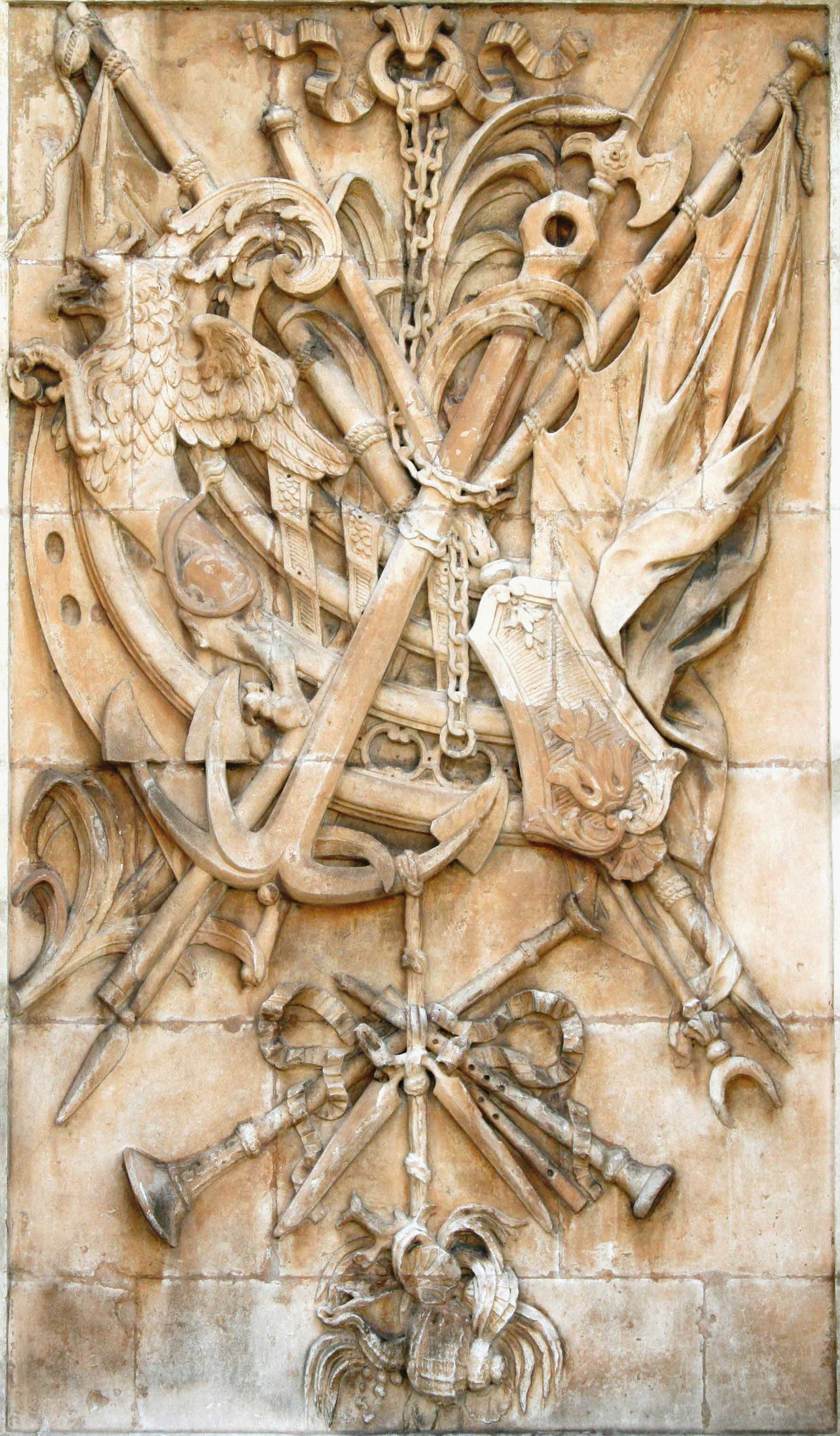
Detail - door of the arsenal of Toulon

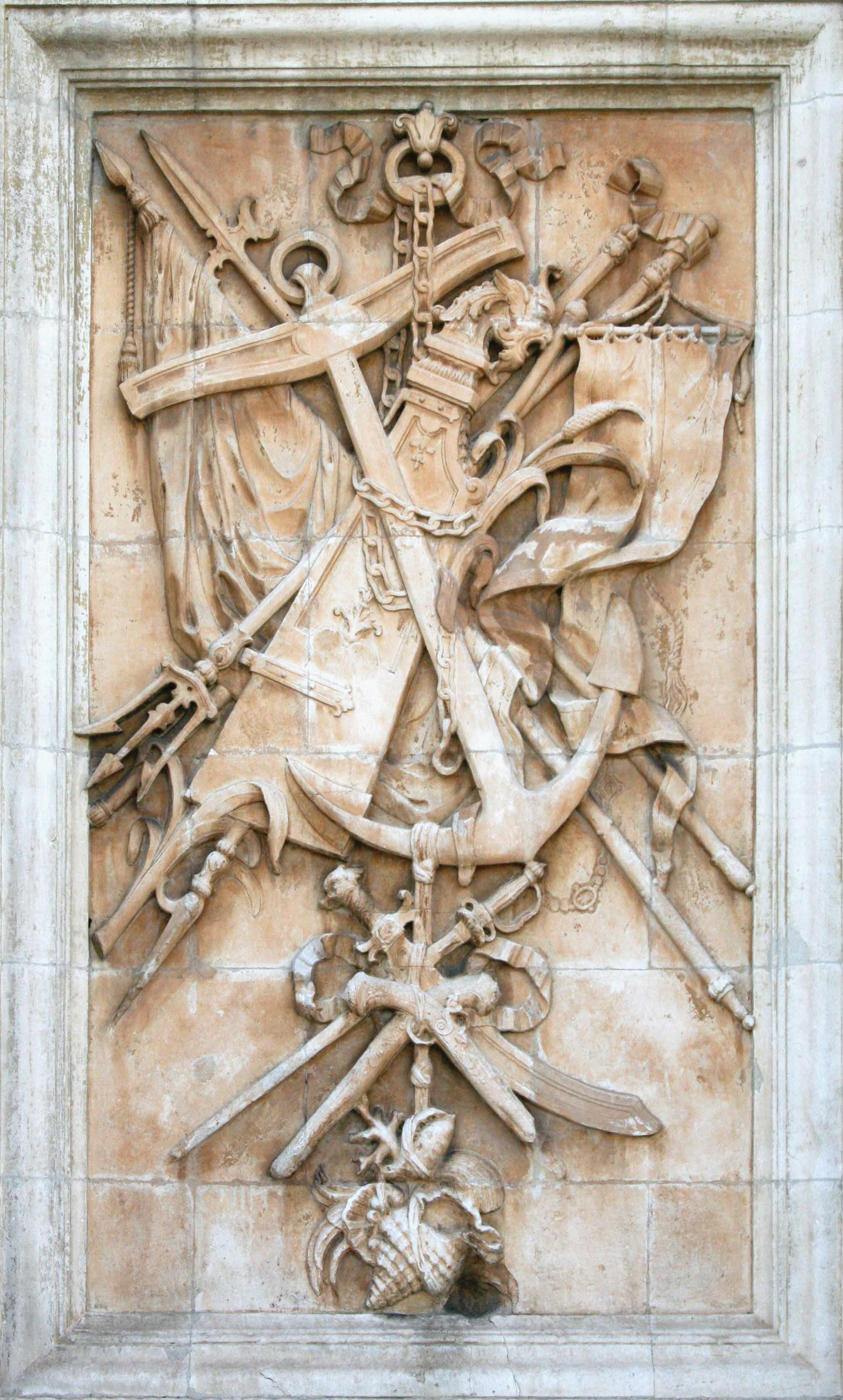
Detail - door of the arsenal of Toulon

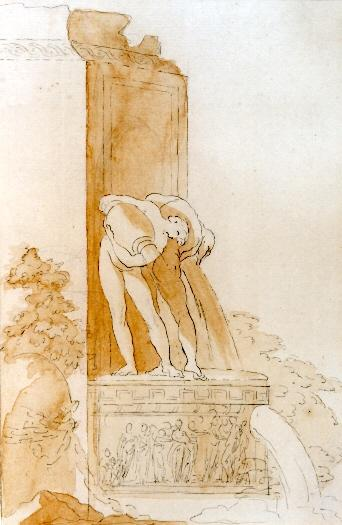
Sketch for a fountain
