= José Álvarez Cubero =

Spanish sculptor (1768–1827)

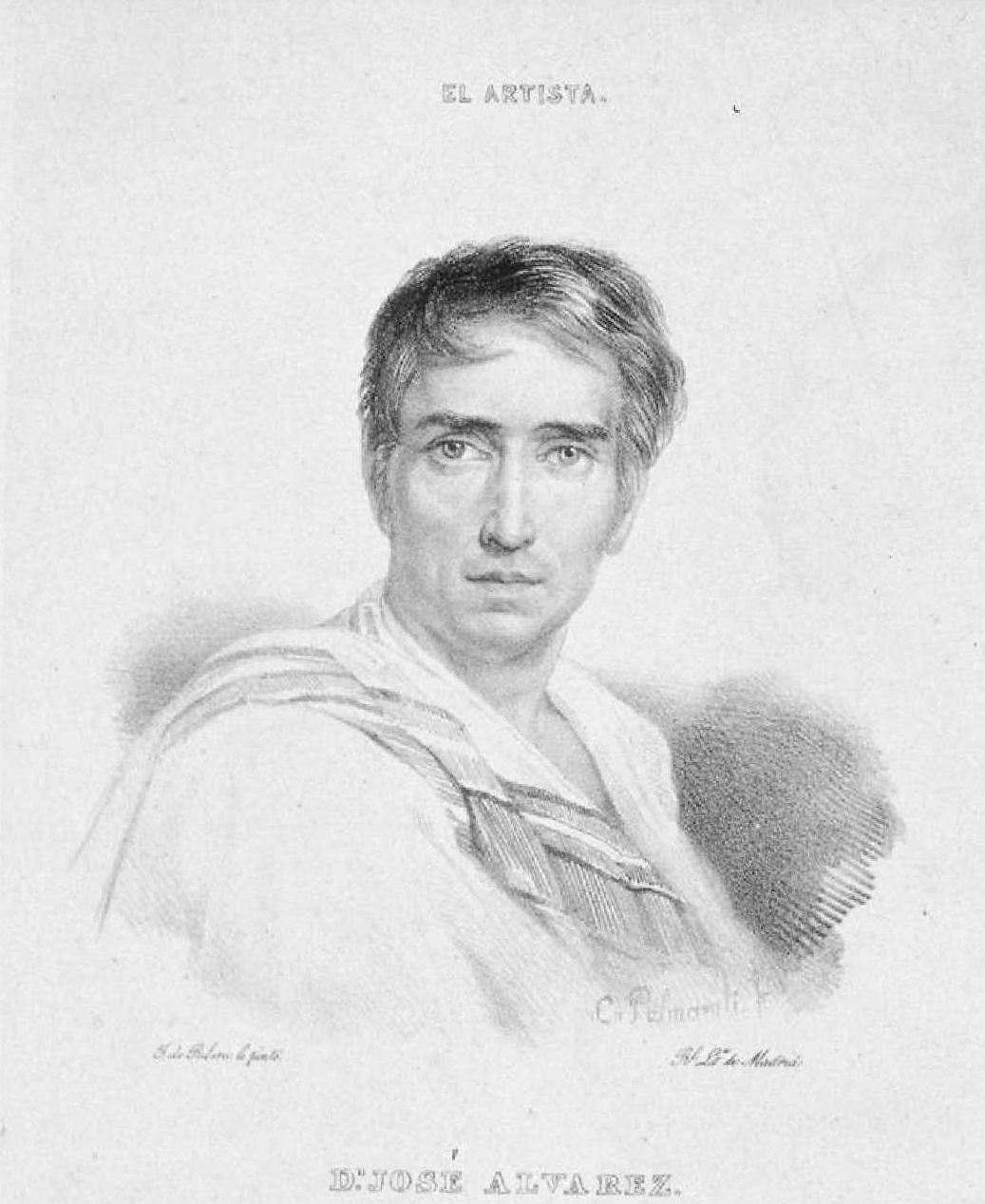
- Don José Álvarez y Cubero, 1835
- Born: 23 April 1768; Priego de Córdoba, Spain
- Died: 26 November 1827 (aged 59); Madrid
- Occupation: Sculptor
- Known for: Congreso de los Diputados

José Álvarez Cubero (23 April 1768 – 26 November 1827) was a Spanish sculptor in the neoclassical style. He spent a large part of his career in Paris and Rome.

== Biography ==
José Álvarez de Pereira y Cubero was born at Priego de Córdoba on 23 April 1768, the son of a stonemason. He spent all his spare time drawing and modelling. He was taught by the French sculptor Miguel Verdiguier at Cordova, and at the Academy of San Fernando in Madrid.

In 1799 Charles IV awarded him a pension of 12,000 reals to visit Paris and Rome. In 1804 he executed a statue of Ganymede while in Paris, now in the Museo del Prado, which gained him immediate recognition as a leading sculptor. His pension was doubled and he left for Rome, where he stayed until within a year of his death.

While in Paris Álvarez married Elizabeth Bougel, by whom he had a son in 1805. This son, Don Jose Alvarez y Bougel, also distinguished himself as a sculptor and a painter but died at Burgos before reaching the age of twenty-five.

His refusal to recognize Joseph Bonaparte as King of Spain led to his imprisonment in Rome. After his release he was employed by Napoleon I to decorate the Quirinal Palace.

In 1816 he was appointed court sculptor to Ferdinand VII. One of the most successful works of the elder Álvarez was a group representing Antilochus and Memnon, which was commissioned in marble (1818) by Ferdinand VII. It is now in the museum of Madrid. He also modelled a few portrait busts (Ferdinand VII., Rossini, the duchess of Alba), which are remarkable for their vigour and fidelity.

After his return to Madrid, he taught at the Academy of San Fernando, where one of his pupils was the young Ponciano Ponzano (1813–1877), later to become one of the most famous of Spanish neoclassical sculptors of his day. Álvarez died in Madrid on 26 November 1827.

== Gallery ==
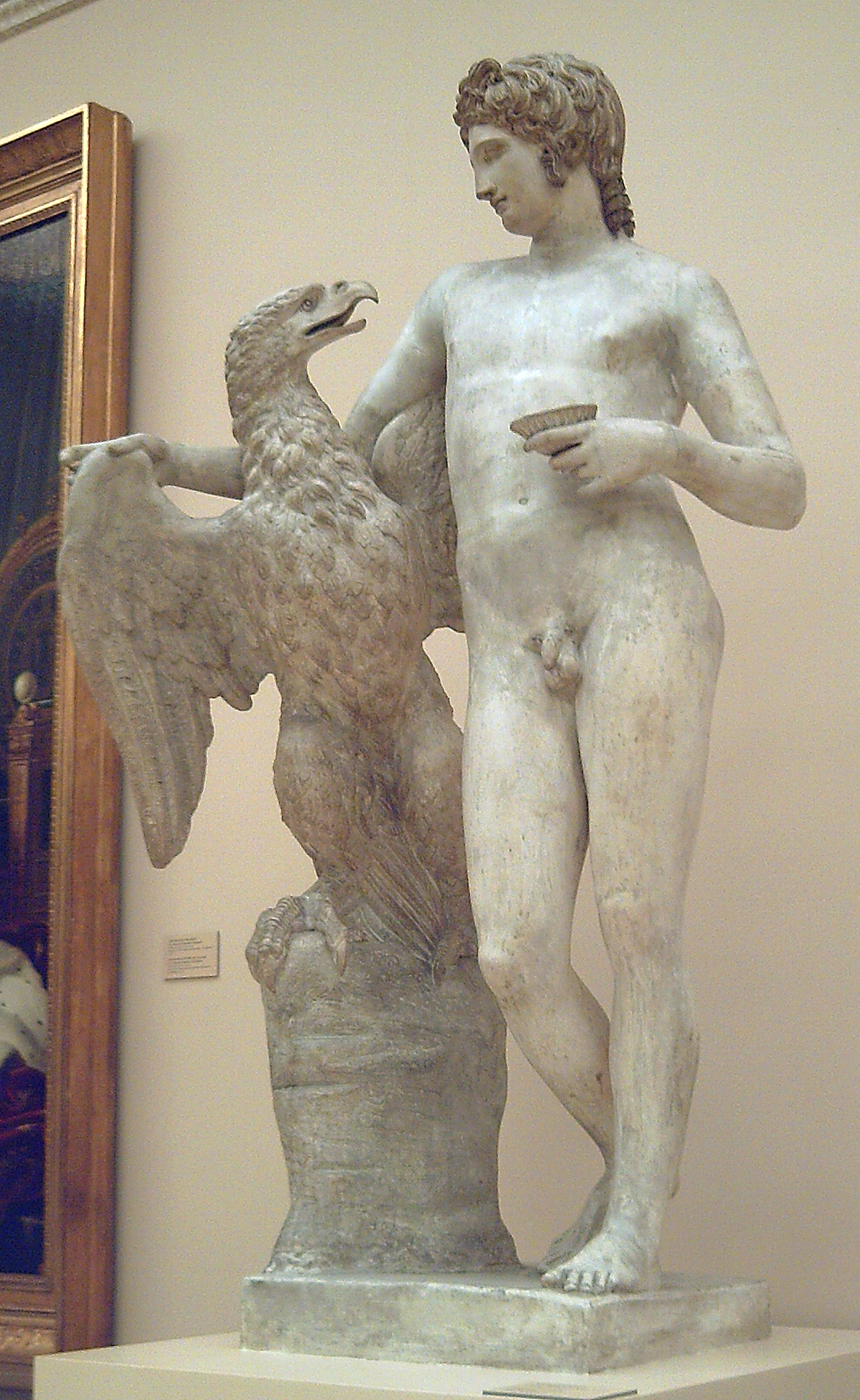
Ganymede, 1804

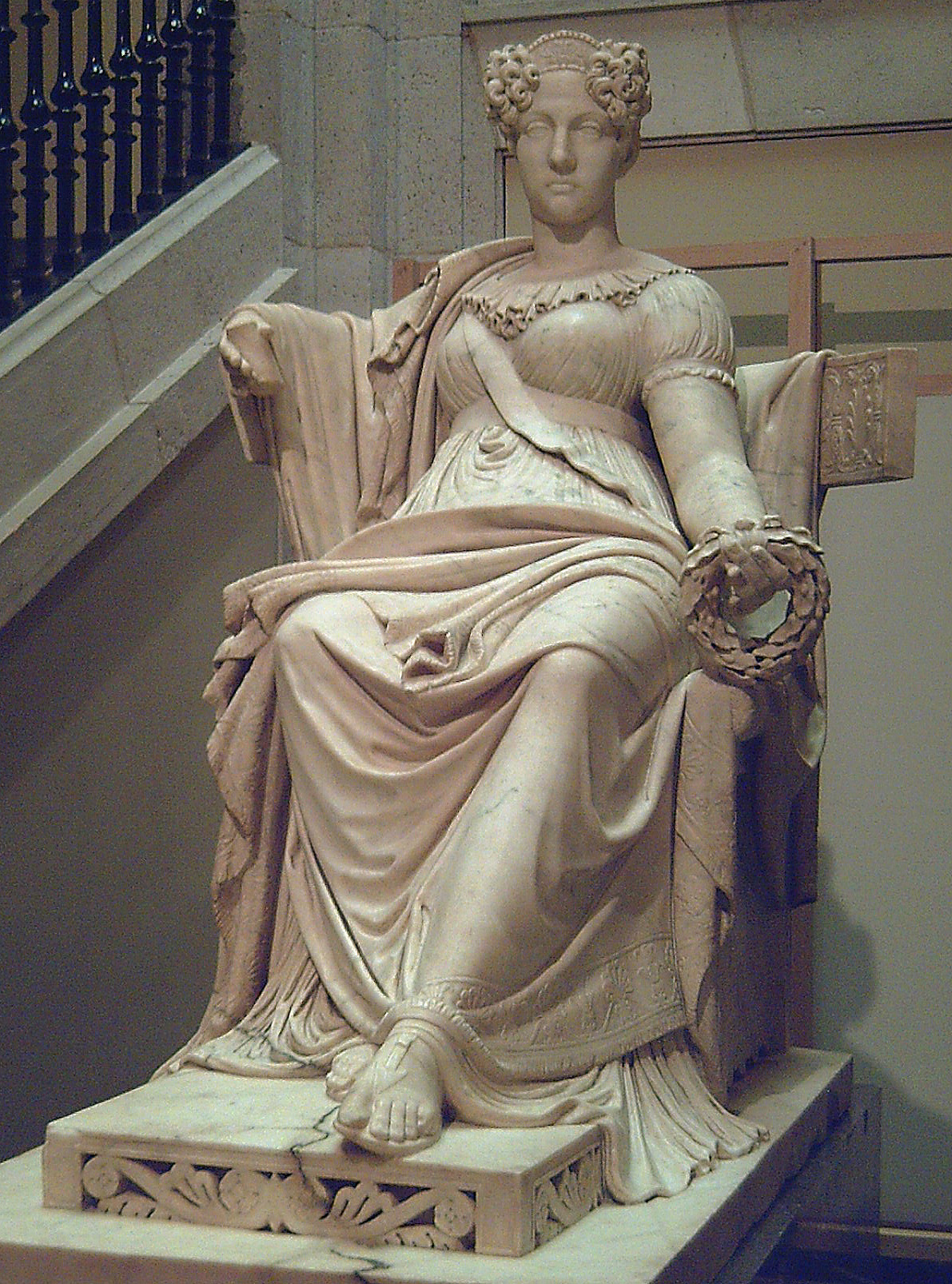
Maria Isabel of Portugal (1797–1818), sculpted in a Neoclassicist style. ca. 1826

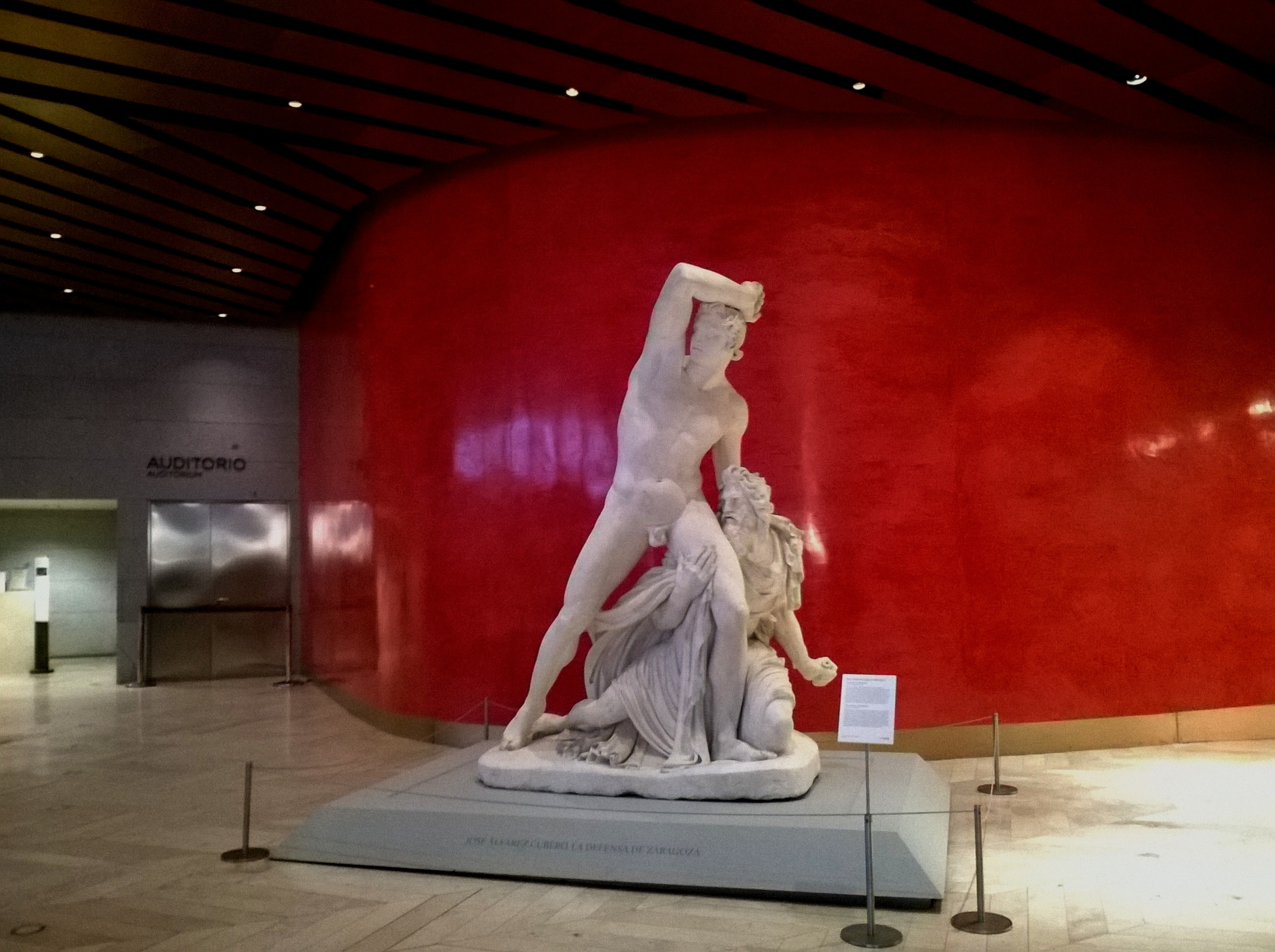
The defense of Zaragoza, 1825
